= 1964 split in the Communist Party of India =

Conflict between Leftists, Centrists and Rightists

Split in the Communist Party of India
- Date: 1947–1967
- Location: India
- Caused by: (disputed): Differences on strategic-tactical line; Differences over alliances with the Indian National Congress; Personality-oriented factionalism; Sino-Soviet split; Sino-Indian border dispute

Parties
Leftists	Centrists	Rightists

Lead figures
B. T. Ranadive; A. K. Gopalan; Promode Dasgupta; Hare Krishna Konar; P. Sundarayya; M. Basavapunnaiah	Ajoy Ghosh; E. M. S. Namboodiripad; Jyoti Basu; Bhupesh Gupta	S. A. Dange; P. C. Joshi

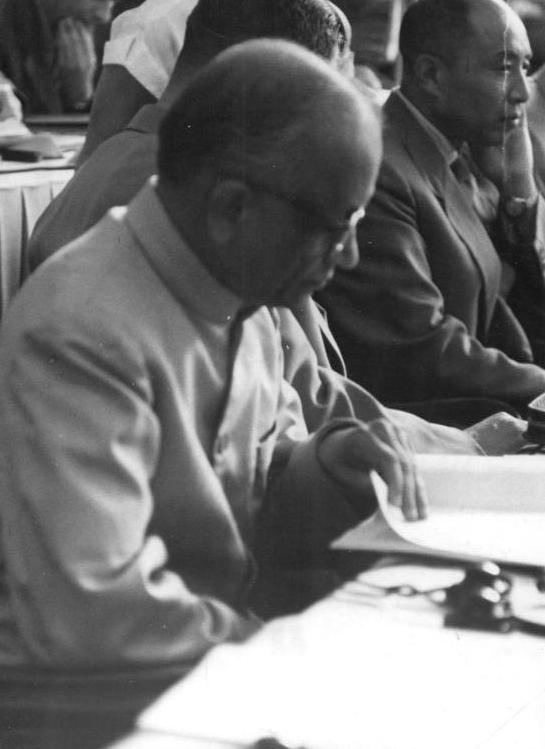
S. A. Dange at the 5th congress of the Socialist Unity Party of Germany, July 1958

In 1964, a major split occurred in the Communist Party of India (CPI). The split was the culmination of decades of tensions and factional infighting. When India became independent in 1947, differences arose of how to adapt to the new situation. As relations between prime minister Jawaharlal Nehru's government and the Soviet Union improved, a faction that sought cooperation with the dominant Indian National Congress (INC) emerged within CPI. This tendency was led by S. A. Dange, whose role in the party hierarchy became increasingly controversial. When the Sino-Indian War broke out in 1962 Dange's opponents within CPI were jailed, but when they were released they sought to challenge his leadership. In 1964 the party was finally divided into two, with the left faction forming the Communist Party of India (Marxist). The split had a lot of regional variations. It also impacted other organizations, such as trade union and peasant movements. The split has been studied extensively by scholars, who have sought to analyze the various domestic and international factors involved.

== Overview ==
=== Research on the split ===
Many scholarly and journalistic works have been dedicated to the split. Scholars that have studied the split include Overstreet and Windmiller, Gelman (Indian Communism in Turmoil, 1963), Wood (Observations on the Indian Communist Party Split, 1965), Devlin (Boring from Within, 1964), Ray (Peking and the Indian CP, 1966), Feuer (Marxisms—How Many?, 1966), Fic (Kerala: Yenan of India, 1969), Ram (Indian Communism: Split Within a Split, 1969), Franda (Radical Politics in West Bengal, 1971), Sen Gupta (Communism in Indian Politics, 1972), Kaviraj Sudipta (1979), Thomas Nossiter (1982; 1988) and Singh (1994).

There is a commonly held perception that the split in CPI was merely an extension of the Sino-Soviet split. The viewpoint that the split was primarily caused by international factors and the role of the Chinese Communist Party (CCP) has been upheld by a sector in CPI after the split. Some scholars have sought to portray the split as directly linked to divisions in the world communist movement, whilst others have emphasized indigenous causes. Rao (1983) argues that the narrative that CPI supported the Soviet Union and CPI(M) supported China is an oversimplification. Per Mitra el at. (2004) the circumstances leading up to the split were complex, with local, national and international factors intertwined.

Per Nossiter (1982) the Sino-Soviet split had repercussions in CPI, but that the 'fundamental cleavage' in the party predated the rupture between Moscow and Peking. According to him, the two key-issues debates in CPI in the 1950s were on one hand the relations with the national bourgeoisie, Nehru and the Indian National Congress, and on the other hand the possibilities to work within the limits of the Indian constitution. These differences were compounded by close links with Communist Party of the Soviet Union (CPSU) and the shifts in CPSU policies (improved Soviet-Nehru relations and peaceful transition to socialism). Furthermore, Nossiter affirms that the Sino-Indian border issue led to the enmeshment of the preexisting internal divisions in CPI and the Sino-Soviet Split.

Per Adamson (1966) the split in 1964 represented a mere formalization of profound and longstanding cleavages within the Communist Party of India. Wood (1965) states that the split in CPI was in many ways atypical for the world communist movement, and shouldn't be reduced to just a confrontation between pro-Soviet and pro-Chinese factions. Per Wood the splits in most other communist parties originated in the 1960 International Meeting of Communist and Workers Parties whilst the history of the CPI split is more profound, running back to the foundation of the party.

Per Gunther (2001) international issues like the Sino-Soviet split, the Soviet line of peaceful coexistence with the Western world, improved Soviet relations with Nehru government and the 1962 Sino-Indian war were factors in the split, the most important factor was the domestic situation, i.e. the stance of CPI towards the Indian National Congress.

According to Sharma (1978) split took place in backdrop of the Sino-Soviet split, the 1962 war and differences on how to assess the economic and political situation India. As a result of the latter, the party failed to articulate a strategic-tactical line of revolution acceptable for both leftist and rightist factions, in particular on how to relate to the Indian National Congress and the right-wing opposition parties like the Swatantra Party and Jan Sangh. Per Sharma most studies on the split have ascribed the split to a combination of these 3 factors, albeit in varying degrees. Whilst Sharma agrees that these three factors 'accelerated' the split he seeks to point to other factors often overlooked by commentators, namely the stark regional variations in which CPI operated, leadership rivalry and personality-oriented factionalism. Sharma argues that the role of Dange in the party had been a source of contention even in the 1940s, that tensions grew between his supporters and opponents as he steadily arose in the party hierarchy in the years that followed. In particular in the midst of the April 1964 split ideological and strategic issues were put to the back-burner, and rivalries of personality and power struggles came to the forefront. Mohanty (1977) also indicates that personal and factional rivalries were factors in the lead-up to the split.

=== Factions and nomenclature ===
Different commentators use different ways to describe the factions within CPI in the lead-up to the split. Sharma (1978), for example, portrays a division into in two factions before the split, leftists and rightists. Per his account Dange (Note: S.A. Dange (1899 – 1991) Maharashtra - No. 3 in the CPI hierarchy in the 1950s, Leader of CPI group in Lok Sabha after the 1957 Indian general election, argued for support to the Nehru government on Sino-Indian border conflict, became CPI chairman in 1962, continued as leader of CPI(Right) after 1964 split, expelled from CPI in 1981.), Z.A. Ahmed (Note: Z.A. Ahmed (1908 – 1999) Uttar Pradesh - Secretary of CPI in Uttar Pradesh 1951-1956, Member of the Rajya Sabha for four terms: 1958–1962, 1966–1972, 1972–1978, 1990-1994, married to Hajra Begum), M.N. Govindan Nair (Note: M.N. Govindan Nair (1910 – 1984) Kerala - Secretary of CPI in Kerala as of 1957, Member of Travancore-Cochin Legislative Assembly 1952-1954, Member of Rajya Sabha 1962-1967, Member of Kerala Legislative Assembly 1967-1970, Minister for Agriculture and Electricity in 2nd Namboodiripad Kerala ministry 1967-1969, Minister for Transport and Electricity in 2nd C. Achutha Menon ministry 1971-1977, Member of Lok Sabha 1977-1979), Sharma (Note: Yogendra Sharma( - 1990) Bihar - General Secretary of Bihar State Kisan Sabha 1951—1956, Secretary of CPI in Bihar 1956—1962, CPI National Council member, elected to Lok Sabha in 1967 election, as of the early 1980s the leader of the CPI group in the Rajya Sabha, editor of Hindi organs Mukti Sangharsh and Kamyunist, removed from the CPI National Council and other party posts in 1983 for having carried a letter from Indira Gandhi to Yuri Andropov.), Bhupesh Gupta (Note: Bhupesh Gupta (1914 - 1984) West Bengal - Member of Rajya Sabha 1952-1981.) were rightist leaders and E.M.S. Namboodiripad (Note: E.M.S. Namboodiripad (1909–1998) Kerala – Chief Minister of Kerala 1957-1959, 1967-1969, CPI(M) General Secretary 1977-1992), P. Sundarayya (Note: P. Sundarayya (1913 - 1985) - Elected to Rajya Sabha in 1955, Member of Andhra Pradesh Legislative Assembly 1955-1967), Jyoti Basu (Note: Jyoti Basu (1914-2010) West Bengal - Elected to the Bengal Legislative Assembly in 1946, Member of the West Bengal Legislative Assembly 1957-1972, 1977-2001, Deputy Chief Minister of West Bengal 1967-1969, Chief Minister of West Bengal 1977-2000, offered post as Prime Minister of India in 1996 which was rejected by CPI(M), Member of CPI(M) Politburo from its foundation until his death.), Harkishan Singh Surjeet (Note: Harkishan Singh Surjeet (1916 - 2008) Punjab - Secretary of CPI in Punjab as of 1952, Member of Punjab Legislative Assembly 1954-1959, 1967-1972, Member of Rajya Sabha 1978 to 1982, CPI(M) general secretary 1992-2005.), Hare Krishna Konar (Note: Hare Krishna Konar (1915 – 1974) West Bengal - General Secretary of All India Kisan Sabha (1968–1974). Leader of CPI(M) of and Member of the West Bengal Legislative Assembly 1957-1972, Minister of Land & Land Revenue 1967-1968, 1969-1970, Member of National Council Central Committee of CPI 1958-1964, Member of Central Committee CPI(M) from its foundation until his death. He was sentenced for 6 years imprisoned in Cellular Jail and founded the Communist Consolidation in 1935) were leftist leaders. Sharma notes that Gupta vacillated, not taking a clear stand for neither side. Writers like Crouch (1966) and Mallick (1994) describes three factions; leftists, centrists and rightists. The publication Thought used the labels 'Rucos' ('Russian Communists'), 'Chicos' ('Chinese Communists') and 'Cencos' ('Centrist Communists') to identity the CPI factions.

Following the 11 April 1964 CPI National Council meeting the centrist trend was divided into a 'left-centrist' trend, led by Namboodiripad and Basu, and a 'right-centrist' trend led by Gupta. The former sided with the leftists in the split, the latter with the rightist. But per the RSP organ The Call there was also a 'centralist centrist' trend in West Bengal, who appealed for party unity and refused to pick a side in the split.

After the emergence of two separate parties in 1964, some authors began using the names 'CPI(Right)'/'Right Communist Party' or 'CPI(Left)'/'Left Communist Party'. Both parties insisted that they were the authentic CPI, and simply called themselves 'CPI'. The CPI(Left) approached the Election Commission of India ahead of the March 1965 Kerala Legislative Assembly election, requesting to contest the elections under the name of the Communist Party of India. The ECI refused the petition, as CPI(Left) represented a minority of the parliamentary faction of the undivided CPI. In response the CPI(Left) registered itself as the 'Communist Party of India (Marxist)' with the ECI, and the ECI awarded it the hammer and sickle as its election symbol. The CPI(Left) would henceforth be known as the CPI(M).

== Background ==
=== Turbulent years: 1947-1953 ===
==== Independence of India ====
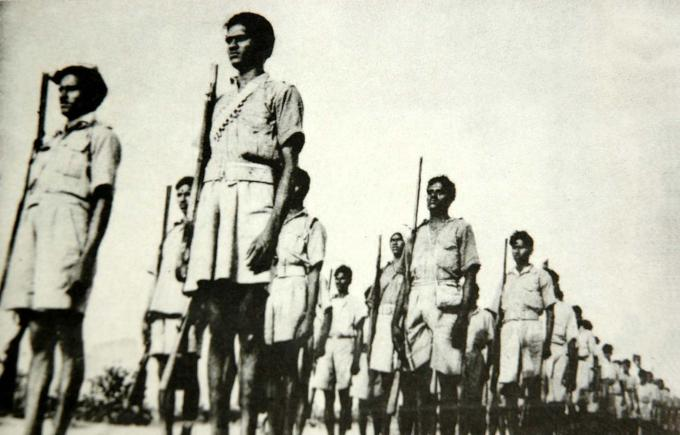
During the Telangana armed struggle (1946–1951), Andhra communists developed a 'Maoist' line of peasant warfare.

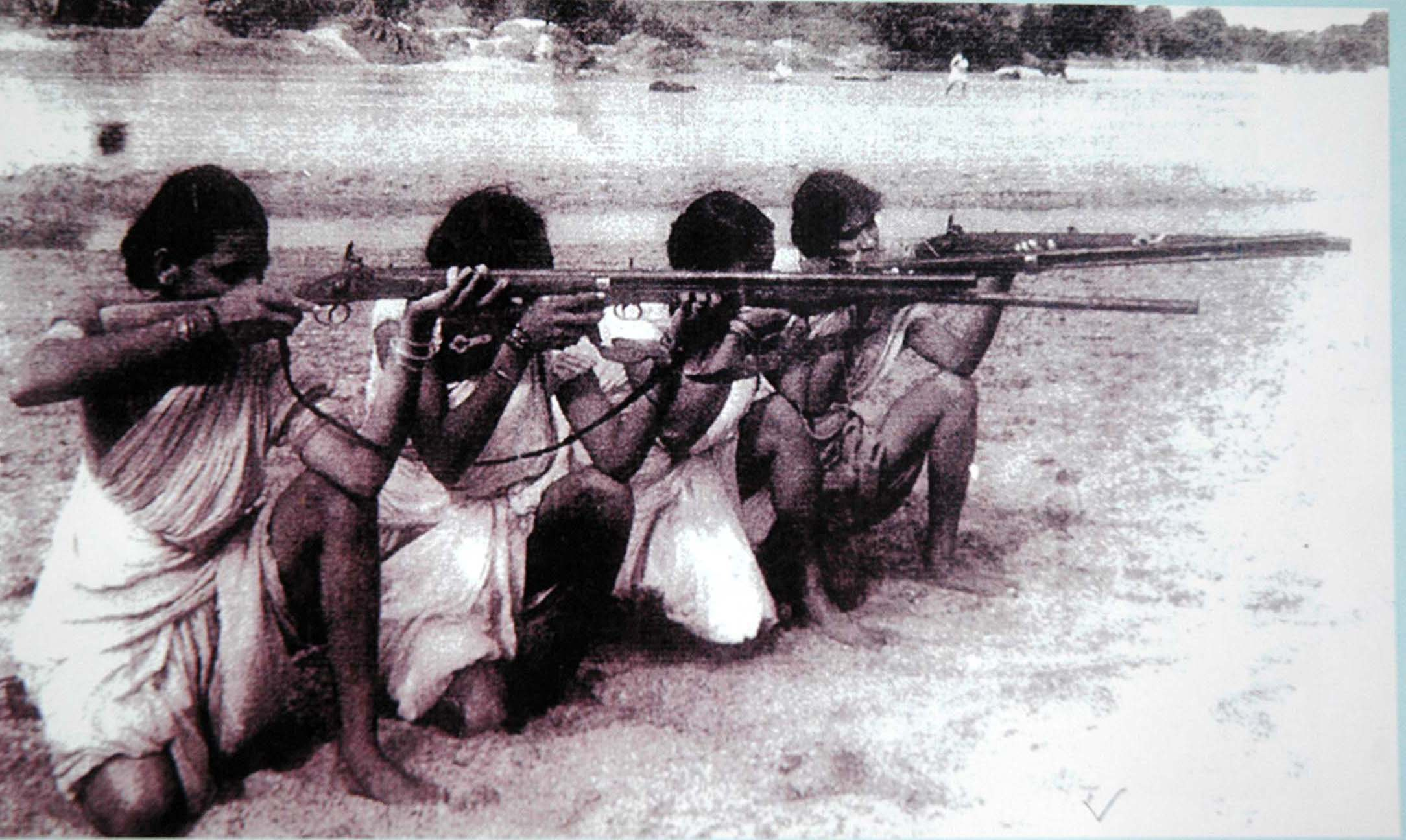
Guerrillas of the Telangana armed struggle

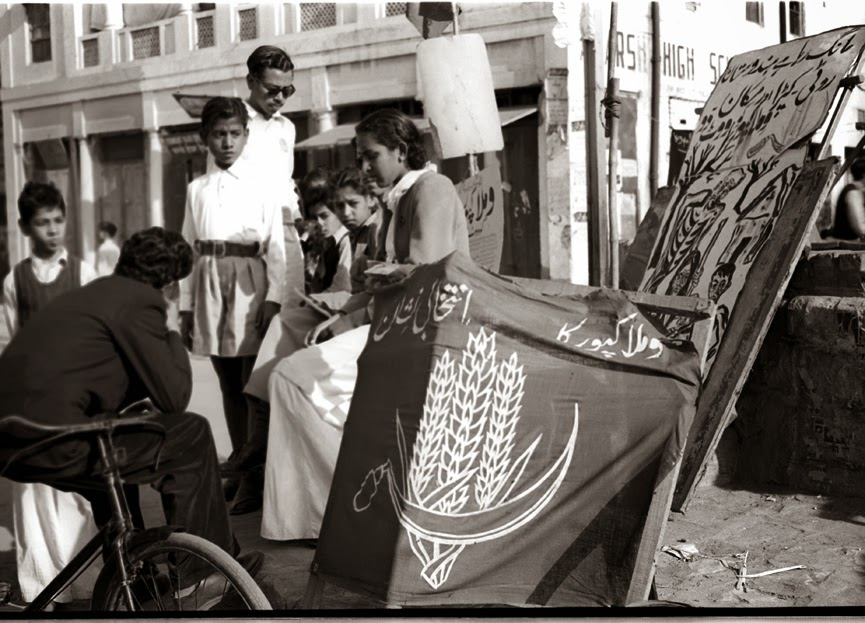
CPI election campaign in Karol Bagh, Delhi, for the 1952 Indian general election.

Namboodiripad, himself one of the main protagonists in the split, argued that the split had its roots with the transfer of power in 1947 as different leaders developed different views on the new situation. On the eve of the Independence of India, CPI was led by P.C. Joshi (Note: P.C. Joshi (1907-1980) - CPI general secretary 1943-1947). Under Joshi's tenure as CPI general secretary legal struggles was the main tactical line of the party but the party also led militant mass struggles, most notably the Telangana Rebellion and the Tebhaga movement. And as a result, the party was divided on the issue of how to characterize the new political situation after the transfer of power in 1947. Joshi, the party general secretary, argued that Independence was genuine and represented an achievement of the national bourgeoisie. But the two other members of the CPI politburo - B.T. Ranadive (Note: B.T. Ranadive (1904 - 1990) Maharashtra - became CPI Central Committee member in 1934, CPI general secretary in 1948, in 1950 removed from posts as general secretary and Central Committee member, named Secretary of CPI in Maharashtra in 1955, re-inducted to Central Committee at 1956 Palghat Party Congress, jailed 1962-1966, elected to AITUC general council in 1966, founding president of the Centre of Indian Trade Unions in 1970, cousin of G. Adhikari) and Gangadhar Adhikari (Note: Gangadhar Adhikari (1898 - 1981) - Party theoretician, one of the early Indian Marxists in Europe, sentenced in the Meerut Conspiracy Case, led CPI during its reorganisation of 1933-1934, cousin of B.T. Ranadive) - argued that the transfer of power was a sham measure by orchestrated by British imperialism.

==== Second Party Congress and the Zhdanov Doctrine ====
At the 2nd Party Congress, held in Calcutta in 1948, there was an abrupt change leadership and political line. The moderate Joshi was replaced by Ranadive as the new general secretary of the party and people's democratic revolution through class struggle and mass upsurge became the new party line. The new party line drew inspiration from the Zhdanov Doctrine. However the attempt to organize a mass upsurge failed and the party leaders were either jailed or forced to go underground. Between 1949 and 1951 factional conflict virtually paralyzed the party. By mid-1949 Andhra communists had begun advocating that a 'Maoist' strategy for revolution was apt for India, based on their experience from the Telangana armed struggle. In 1950 Ranadive was deposed from his role as general secretary, and the Andhra cadres led by C. Rajeshwara Rao (Note: C. Rajeshwara Rao (1914-1994) Andhra Pradesh - Joined CPI in 1931, CPI Andhra Provincial Committee secretary 1943-1952, leader of Telangana armed struggle, general secretary CPI 1950-1951, June–December 1964 Secretary of the National Council of CPI, CPI general secretary December 1964-1990. Received the Order of Lenin in 1974.) took over the leadership of the party.

==== From armed struggle to parliamentary politics ====
CPI Central Committee elected at 1951 Calcutta Party Conference
General Secretary
Ajoy Ghosh (Note: Ajoy Ghosh (1909 - 1962) - CPI general secretary 1951-1962.)
Politburo
Muzaffar Ahmed (Note: Muzaffar Ahmed (1889-1973) West Bengal – vice President of All India Trade Union Congress in 1927, general secretary of Bengal Workers and Peasants Party in 1928, one of the main accused in the Meerut Conspiracy Case, in CPI Central Committee/National Council 1933-1948, 1950-1964, CPI(M) Central Committee 1964-1973, jailed for over 20 years and spent over 8 years in underground.)
Jyoti Basu
S.A. Dange
E.M.S. Namboodiripad
P. Ramamurthi (Note: P. Ramamurthi (1908-1987) Tamil Nadu – One of the founders of CPI branch in Tamilnad, elected to Madras Legislative Assembly in 1952 whilst in jail, CPI Politburo member in 1953, elected to Lok Sabha in 1967 and Rajya Sabha in 1971 and 1977.)
Other members of
the Central Committee
Z.A. Ahmed
Romesh Chandra (Note: Romesh Chandra (1919-2016) General Secretary of All India Peace Council 1952-1963. General Secretary of the World Peace Council in 1953, WPC President in 1977.)
A.K. Gopalan (Note: A.K. Gopalan (1904-1977) Kerala - Member of the Congress Socialist Party, Member of All India Congress Committee, President and Secretary of the Kerala Pradesh Congress Committee, Executive Committee Member of the Trade Union International of Agricultural, Forestry and Plantation Workers, Member of Lok Sabha 1952-1977.)
Bhupesh Gupta
Sohan Singh Josh (Note: Sohan Singh Josh (1898-1982) Punjab - Active in the Akali movement. One of the accused in the 1929-1933 Meerut Conspiracy Case. From 1933 onwards he led the 'Official Group' faction in CPI in Punjab. He served as secretary of the Punjab unit of CPI 1942-1943. Editor of the CPI Punjabi-language daily newspaper Nawan Zamana.)
Ranen Sen (Note: Ranen Sen (1909–2003) West Bengal - Member of Anushilan Samiti. Member of the Calcutta District Committee of CPI, and a member of the first CPI Central Committee formed in 1933. Secretary of Bengal Provincial Committee in 1948. Politburo Member 1951-1956. Member of West Bengal Legislative Assembly 1952-1962, member of Lok Sabha 1962-1977. Secretary CPI West Bengal Provincial Committee 1969-1971. All India Trade Union Congress president in 1972.)
Y.D. Sharma (Note: Y.D. Sharma (1918 - 2004) Delhi - one of the founders of the CPI Delhi unit in 1944, Central Committee member of CPI in 1951, in 1973 he became the secretary of the All India Trade Union Congress, later becoming its vice president.)
P. Sundarayya
S.S. Yusuf (Note: Sant Singh Yusuf (-1982) Uttar Pradesh – trade union organizer in the 1920s in Delhi and Bombay, sent by CPI to Kanpur in 1936 to organize workers there, became president of the Kanpur Mazdoor Sabha in 1938, Member of the Uttar Pradesh Legislative Assembly 1962-1967, 1974-1977. As of the mid-1970s he served as the President of the Uttar Pradesh Trade Union Congress. He served as vice president of the All India Trade Union Congress.)

The following year the political line was reversed once again. The CPSU instructed CPI to cancel the Telangana struggle. Notably the CPSU had begun to see Nehru as increasingly independent from the US. The party gathered for a convention in Calcutta which changed the party line to opt for peaceful methods of struggle, rejecting the legacy of Ranadive (who had sought to imitate the Russian revolution) and Rao (who had sought to imitate the Chinese Communist Revolution). The convention adopted a new party program, which identified India as 'dependent and semi-colonial country' The 1951 program characterized the Nehru government as a "[g]overnment of landlords and princes and the reactionary big bourgeoisie collaborating with the British imperialists" It outlined that the national bourgeoisie was not part of the governing bloc. The 1951 program temporarily settled the factional conflict inside the party. Subsequently, after the 1951 Calcutta convention CPI began preparations for participating in 1951–52 Indian general election. The 1951 convention restructured the Central Committee of the party, reducing its membership from 31 (as elected at the 2nd Party Congress) to 21. A new general secretary was named. Ajoy Ghosh was a compromise candidate who was accepted by all factions in the party. But in the years to come Ghosh would frequently be absent on medical leave, and factional rivalries would re-emerge.

CPI was heavily factionalized during the years of 1947–1953. The top leadership housed plenty of internal antagonisms; there differences on ideological, strategic and tactical issues but also personal rivalries. During Joshi's period as general secretary, the group around Ranadive organized opposition towards him. When Ranadive held the general secretaryship, Joshi and C. Rajeshwara Rao undermined Ranadive's leadership. During 1949-1950 rumours were actively circulated in the party, accusing Dange of being a government agent. Rao, in turn, was undermined by the Ranadive faction during 1950–1953.

=== Consolidation of the party: 1953-1959 ===
==== Third Party Congress: Madurai ====
The 3rd Party Congress was held in Madurai between 27 December 1953 and 3 January 1954. 293 delegates participated. At the Madurai Party Congress CPI resolved to continue the path of legal struggles. However, in theory the party still maintained the notion of armed struggle as an option. And whilst the Madurai Party Congress CPI had officially rejected 'Maoist' strategy for revolution in India, a move directly related to Soviet pressure on the party, parts of the party remained inspired by the line of the CCP.

Delegations at the 1953 Madurai Party Congress
Provincial Committee (PC)	No. of delegates	PC Secretary
Andhra	59	C. Rajeshwara Rao
Assam	?	Phani Bora (Note: Phani Bora (1923 – 2004) Assam - Secretary of the Assam Provincial Committee in 1951, CPI Central Committee member in 1953, Member of Assam Legislative Assembly 1959-1962, 1967-1972)
Bihar	21	Yogendra Sharma
Bombay City	?	Prabhakar Balwant Vaidya (Note: Prabhakar Balwant Vaidya Maharashtra - became Secretary of the Bombay City Provincial Committee of CPI in 1955, Member of the Bombay Legislative Council in the 1960s.)
Delhi State	5	M. Farooqui (Note: M. Farooqui (1920-1997) Delhi - General secretary of the All India Students Federation in 1941. Secretary of CPI Delhi unit 1944-1971. He was elected to the CPI National Council in 1958. He joined the CPI National Executive in 1974, and the CPI National Secretariat in 1982.)
Gujerat	4	Dinkar Mehta (Note: Dinkar Mehta (1907 - 1989) Gujarat - Founder of the Congress Socialist Party in Gujarat, as of 1936 placed in charge of organising CPI in Gujarat, elected CPI Central Committee member in 1953, vice president of Maha Gujarat Janta Parishad 1957-1960, Member of the Legislative Council of the Bombay State 1958-1960., CPI(M) Central Committee member in 1964., Gujarat State Committee Secretary of CPI(M), Mayor of Ahmedabad 1966-1967.)
Karnatak	5	N.L. Upadhyaya (Note: N.L. Upadhyaya ( -1989) Karnataka - founder of CPI branch in the state, CPI(M) Central Committee member in 1964, CPI(M) Karnataka State Secretariat member.)
Madhya Pradesh	4	Sudam Deshmukh (Note: Sudam Deshmukh)
Madhya Bharat and Bhopal	4	L.R. Khandkar
Maharashtra	24	S.S. Mirajkar (Note: S.S. Mirajkar (-1980) Maharashtra - President of the All India Trade Union Congress 1957-1973., mayor of Bombay in 1958.)
Malabar	37	K. Damodaran (Note: K. Damodaran (1912 - 1976) Kerala – Member of the first communist group in Calicut, leader of the Congress Socialist Party in Malabar along with Namboodiripad, Secretary of the Malabar Provincial Committee of CPI as of 1953, Member of Rajya Sabha 1964-1970.)
Manipur	?	Thokchom Bira Singh
Marathwada	4	C.D. Chaudhary
Orissa	?	Gurucharan Patnaik (Note: Gurucharan Patnaik Orissa - CPI secretary in Utkal (Orissa), elected to CPI Central Committee in 1953 and 1956)
Punjab	20	Harkishan Singh Surjeet
Rajasthan	4	H.K. Vyas (Note: H.K. Vyas (1922 - ?) Rajasthan - president of the C.P. and Berar Trade Union Congress 1948–1949, CPI Rajasthan State Secretary, Member of Rajasthan Legislative Assembly 1952-1957, CPI Central Committee member in 1953, All India Trade Union Congress Rajasthan State Committee Secretary in 1965, editor of the daily newspaper Janyug, removed from CPI National Council in 1986.)
Tamilnad	28	M.R. Venkataraman (Note: M.R. Venkataraman)
Telangana	32	Baddam Yella Reddy (Note: Baddam Yella Reddy (1906-1979) Andhra Pradesh – Member of Lok Sabha 1952-1972, Member of Andhra Pradesh Legislative Assembly 1958-1962, 1972-1977.)
Travancore-Cochin	33	C. Achutha Menon (Note: C. Achutha Menon (1913 – 1991) Kerala – Member of Travancore Cochin Legislative Assembly 1952-1954, elected to the Kerala Legislative Assembly in 1957, 1960, 1970 (twice), Finance Minister in 1st Namboodiripad cabinet 1957-1959, Member of Rajya Sabha 1968-1970, Chief Minister of Kerala 1969-1970, 1970-1977.)
Tripura	10	Dasarath Deb (Note: Dasarath Deb (1916-1998) Tripura - President of the Ganamukti Parishad, Chief Minister of Tripura 1993-1998)
Uttar Pradesh	23	Z.A. Ahmed
West Bengal	44	Jyoti Basu
Central Committee Office	7	

CPI Central Committee elected at the 1953 Madurai Party Congress
CC members elected, also members of new Politburo	Votes	CC members elected	Votes	CC members elected	Votes	CC members elected	Votes	Unsuccessful candidates	Votes
Ajoy Ghosh	293	A.K. Gopalan	291	D.V. Rao (Note: D.V. Rao (1917 - 1984) Andhra Pradesh - Secretariat member of the CPI Telangana Committee (February 1952), youngest member of the CPI Central Committee, elected to Lok Sabha in the 1957 Indian general election, co-founded the Andhra Pradesh Coordination Committee of Communist Revolutionaries (APCCCR) in 1968, co-founded the Unity Centre of Communist Revolutionaries of India (Marxist–Leninist) (UCCRI(ML)) in 1975.)	273	N.L. Upadhyaya	245	Hajrah Begum (Note: Hajra Begum (1910 - 2003) Uttar Pradesh - Part of the Congress Socialist Party nucleus in Allahabad in the 1930s, one of the first female members of CPI, founding leader of the National Federation of Indian Women, married to Z.A. Ahmed)	188
E.M.S. Namboodiripad	293	Jyoti Basu	286	Ravi Narayana Reddy (Note: Ravi Narayana Reddy (1908-1991) Andhra Pradesh - Member of the Lok Sabha 1952-1957, 1962-66, Member of the Andhra Pradesh Legislative Assembly 1957-1962)	272	Dinkar Mehta	241	Vishwanath Mukherjee (Note: Vishwanath Mukherjee)	173
P. Sundarayya	288	C. Achutha Menon	286	Phani Bora	266	Muzaffar Ahmed	239	B. Srinivasa Rao (Note: B. Srinivasa Rao (1907-1961). B. Srinivasa Rao was a member of the Congress Socialist Party and the Communist Party of India. He hailed from present-day Karnataka, but moved to Tamilnad and became a peasant organiser there. He was one of the nine founding members of the Tamilnad unit of CPI. He played an important role in the Tamil peasant movement from 1935 onward, in spite of not knowing Tamil language upon his arrival in the region. As of 1935 he was the secretary of the Congress Socialist Party in Madras. B. Srinivasa Rao was jailed for having distributed leaflets calling for boycott to the King George V Silver Jubilee celebration. After his release from prison he worked with P. Jeevanandham and P. Ramamurthi in setting up various trade unions. He served as Joint Secretary of the All India Kisan Sabha 1954-1957. He was elected to the CPI National Council at the 1958 Amritsar Party Congress.)	164
Ranen Sen	285	M.N. Govindan Nair	282	M.R. Venkataraman	266	Sudam Deshmukh	238	B.T. Ranadive	145
Harkishan Singh Surjeet	283	Dasarath Deb	280	Romesh Chandra	261	M. Hanumantha Rao (Note: M. Hanumantha Rao (1917-2001) Andhra Pradesh - Member of Madras Legislative Assembly and Andhra State Legislative Assembly 1952–1955, Member of Andhra Pradesh Legislative Council 1978–1984, Member of Rajya Sabha 1988-1994, Secretary of Andhra Pradesh State Committee of CPI (M) 1964–1982)	230	Yella Reddy	122
P. Ramamurthi	278	Sohan Singh Josh	278	N. Prasad Rao (Note: N. Prasad Rao)	260	S.G. Patkar (Note: S.G. Patkar (1911-1972) Maharashtra - Member Bombay Provincial Congress Committee for 7 years, Member All India Congress Committee for 6 years, elected to Bombay Municipal Corporation in 1940, secretary Girni Kamgar Union (GKU) 1937-1942, general secretary GKU 1942-1951, expelled from CPI in 1950, readmitted as party member, Member of CPI Central Committee 1953-1956, elected to Bombay Legislative Assembly 1957, member of the Administrative Council of the Trade Union International of Textile, Leather and Fur Workers Unions.)	219	Bhowani Sen (Note: Bhowani Sen)	120
C. Rajeshwara Rao	278	S.S. Yusuf	277	S.S. Mirajkar	255	L.R. Khandkar	212	P.C. Joshi	107
S.A. Dange	275	Yogendra Sharma	277	Aruna Asaf Ali	254	Bhupesh Gupta	205	N.C. Sekhar (Note: N.C. Sekhar (1904-1986) Kerala - One of the founders of the communist movement in Kerala, member of Rajya Sabha 1954-1960, suspended from CPI in 1960, joined CPI(M) in 1964, expelled from CPI(M) in 1967.)	69
Z.A. Ahmed	268	S.G. Sardesai (Note: S.G. Sardesai)	277	M. Basavapunniah (Note: M. Basavapunniah)	252	G. Adhikari	194	Bhalchandra	62
		Gurucharan Patnaik	275	H.K. Vyas	247	Y.D. Sharma	192	Kamadar	53
								M. Kalyanasundaram (Note: M. Kalyanasundaram)	49

At the Madurai Party Congress the rightist wing of the party raised opposition to the 1951 party program. The right-wing trend wanted to recognize India as an independent country, and disagreed with the usage of terms like 'semi-colonial' and 'dependent'. The CPI right-wing argued that Nehru stood for independent development and an anti-imperialist foreign policy. The CPI rightists proposed simultaneous struggle against government and Indian National Congress whilst seeking cooperation with progressive sectors inside Congress Party. The CPI leftists on the other hand saw the Nehru government as reactionary, and that its supposedly progressive economic policies were deceptive as the government defended feudal interests. Nevertheless, the CPI leftists could agree to support the Nehru government on foreign policy issues.

The Madurai Party Congress elected a 39-member Central Committee. G. Adhikari defeated the official candidate Hajra Begum for a seat in the Central Committee.

==== Twentieth Congress of the Communist Party of the Soviet Union ====
Just prior to the 20th Congress of the Communist Party of the Soviet Union (held in Moscow in February 1956) relations between the Soviet leadership and the Nehru government had improved significantly. Notably the 20th CPSU congress not only denounced the personality cult around Stalin, furthermore the general declaration of the congress recognized possibility for peaceful transition to socialism. Following the 20th CPSU congress factionalism inside CPI increased. On one side, the endorsement of non-capitalist development and peaceful transition to socialism by the 20th CPSU congress further emboldened the right-wing within CPI. On the other side, the denunciation of Stalin by Khrushchev caused dissent within CPI, which pushed CPI closer to the CCP. In reaction to Khrushchev's statement on Stalin, Ghosh urged CPI members to study the CCP statement On the Historical Experience of the Dictatorship of the Proletariat as a foremost appraisal on Stalin's role.

After the 20th CPSU congress, the New Times magazine carried an authoritative article of CPSU policy, authored by Modeste Rubinstein, titled A Non-Capitalist Path for Underdeveloped Countries. The article, which was reprinted in the CPI monthly New Age made specific reference to India, whereby Nehru and not CPI was described as leading India on path to non-capitalist development, i e. towards socialism. In India, argued Rubinstein, there was a trend towards expansion of the state and co-operative sectors of the economy, which would have indicated that there was the possibility of moving towards a path of non-capitalist development. The article caused a strong reaction in CPI, and Ghosh publicly protested against it. Following the reaction from CPI the CPSU back-tracked a bit on the topic, but would still pressure the CPI to provide support to Nehru and embrace parliamentary tactics.

==== Fourth Party Congress: Palghat ====
CPI Central Committee elected at 1956 Palghat Party Congress
General Secretary
Ajoy Ghosh
Politburo
Z.A. Ahmed
S.A. Dange
E.M.S. Namboodiripad
P. Ramamurthi
C. Rajeshwara Rao
Ranen Sen
P. Sundarayya
Harkishan Singh Surjeet
Other members of
the Central Committee
G. Adhikari
Muzaffar Ahmed
M. Basavapunniah
Jyoti Basu
Phani Bora
Romesh Chandra
K. Damodaran
Dasarath Deb
Sudam Deshmuh
A.K. Gopalan
Bhupesh Gupta
Sohan Singh Josh
P.C. Joshi
C. Achutha Menon
M.N. Govindan Nair
Gurucharan Patnaik
B.T. Ranadive
D.V. Rao
M. Hanumantha Rao
N. Prasada Rao
Baddam Yella Reddy
Ravi Narayana Reddy
S.G. Sardesai
Bhowani Sen
Y.D. Sharma
Yogendra Sharma
N.L. Upadhyaya
M.R. Venkataraman
H.K. Vyas
S.S. Yusuf

The 4th CPI Party Congress, held in Palghat in April 1956, was influenced by the 20th CPSU Congress, i.e. the policies of peaceful co-existence between socialist and imperialist camps and start of de-Stalinization. At the congress discussions on themes such as the nature of Indian independence, the class character of Indian government, economic development and planning policies marked divisions between rightist and leftist trends inside the party. At Palghat, Joshi led a faction that called for a united front with the Indian National Congress. Joshi's grouping gathered about a third of the delegates, according to Namboodiripad. Ranadive represented the opposite extreme at the 1956 Party Congress, 'implacably' opposed to any support to the Indian National Congress.

Per Mohanty (1977) '[t]he Palghat Congress of the CPI in 1956 put forth the line of peaceful struggle and cooperation with the Nehru government.' The Palghat Party Congress confirmed the legal path of the party, and effectively abandoned the notion of armed struggle The Palghat Party Congress removed the description of India as a 'semi-colonial' country from the party program and instead stated that India had recently won its 'independence and sovereignty'. The CPI now supported the Indian government in its Second Five Year Plan, particularly in regards to development of heavy industries. In regards to the Indian capitalists the party now used a much more conciliatory language, as the 4th CPI Party Congress portrayed the conflict between the forces of imperialism and feudalism on one hand confronting 'the entire Indian people, including the national bourgeoisie' on the other. The new party line called for a national democratic front, including the national capitalists. The language of CPI regarding Indian foreign policy also changed significantly - Nehru was no longer branded as a puppet of US and British imperialism, but on the contrary the non-alignment policies of the Nehru government were lauded. The 4th CPI Party Congress described the non-alignment policy as a 'sentinel for peace' and that '[n]eutrality expresses the sentiment of the masses for maintenance of their national freedom.' Nevertheless, the Palghat line argued that whilst the party should support progressive policies of Nehru government, the party should also struggle against reactionary policies of same government.

In the list of the newly elected Central Committee Ghosh, Namboodiripad and Dange occupied the top three slots, followed by Ranadive, Joshi and Rao.

==== 1957 elections ====
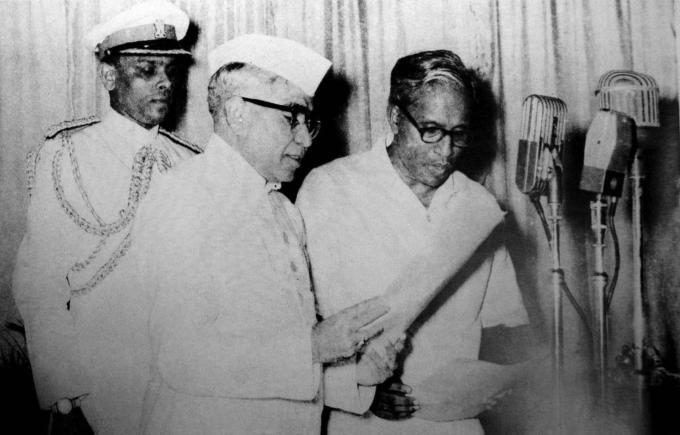
Swearing in ceremony of the Namboodiripad cabinet in Kerala, April 1957

CPI won the 1957 Kerala Legislative Assembly election, which was seen as an affirmation of the peaceful transition line set by the 20th CPSU Congress. The CPI electoral victory in Kerala resulted in the first opposition-run state government in independent India. Namboodiripad was sworn in as Chief Minister. And whilst in the 1952 elections CPI had won 106 seats in the Legislative Assemblies around the country, in the 1957 elections the party won 201 seats nation-wide.

In addition to winning the state assembly election in Kerala, CPI also emerged as the largest opposition party in the parliamentary (Lok Sabha) election. Dange was elected to the Lok Sabha by wide margin. After the election Dange was elected as the new CPI group leader in the Lok Sabha.

The outcome of the 1957 elections would impact the roles of Dange and Namboodiripad within the party hierarchy. During the period of 1953-1956 Namboodiripad was seen as the number two in the party, and he was accepted by all factions as the default acting general secretary during Ghosh's medical leaves. But once he took charge as Chief Minister, he was no longer able to exercise organizational functions at the Delhi party headquarters. Generally Dange had been perceived as the number three in the party hierarchy. But his electoral victory and the role he played as the leader of the largest parliamentary opposition faction significantly increased his political stature. And being present at the parliament in Delhi, in the vicinity of the central party headquarters, enabled Dange to emerge as a potential candidate to act as the replacement for the general secretary during Ghosh's medical absences. Coincidentally, Ghosh had no periods of absence during Namboodiripad's tenure as Chief Minister of Kerala.

Furthermore, the Kerala election victory caused party to impose curbs on militant mass movements across the country, leading to resentment in party ranks both in Kerala and other states. At the 1957 International Meeting of Communist and Workers Parties, held in Moscow, the CCP criticized the CPI for having formed a ministry in Kerala.

==== Fifth Party Congress: Amritsar ====
CPI National Council elected at 1958 Amritsar Party Congress
State	No. of NC members	Members
Party Centre	14	Ajoy Ghosh, S.A. Dange, Bhupesh Gupta, Z.A. Ahmed, Romesh Chandra, N. Prasada Rao, P.C. Joshi, Renu Chakravartty (Note: Renu Chakravartty), Hirendranath Mukherjee (Note: Hirendranath Mukherjee (1907-2004) West Bengal - Member All India Congress Committee 1938-1939, Joint Secretary of Congress Socialist Party Bengal unit, CPI Bengal Provincial Committee member 1947-1951, Member of Lok Sabha 1952-1977, Deputy Leader of CPI Group in Lok Sabha 1954-1964, 1967-1970, Padma Bhusan recipient in 1990, Padma Vibhusan recipient in 1991.), Parvathi Krishnan, Sajjad Zaheer, S.V. Ghate, Hajra Begum, A.K. Gopalan
Andhra Pradesh	15	P. Sundarayya, C. Rajeshwara Rao, M. Basavapunniah, Ravi Narayana Reddy, Makhdoom Mohiuddin (Note: Makhdoom Mohiuddin), T. Nagi Reddy (Note: T. Nagi Reddy), M. Hanumantha Rao, T. Satyanarayana, Y.V Krishna Rao, N. Rajasekhara Reddy (Note: N. Rajasekhara Reddy (1918-1994) Andhra Pradesh - Joined CPI in 1938, elected CPI secretary in Andhra Pradesh in 1961, re-elected CPI Andhra Pradesh secretary in November 1964, in 1971 secretary of the CPI National Council. Brother of Neelam Sanjiva Reddy and brother-in-law of T. Nagi Reddy.), D.V. Rao, Guntur Bapanaiah (Note: Guntur Bapanaiah), K.L. Narasimhan, Baddam Yella Reddy, M. Chandrasekhara Rao (Note: M. Chandrasekhara Rao Andhra Pradesh - Part of the leadership of the Telangana struggle, sided with CPI(Right) in the split.)
Assam	2	Achintya Bhattacharya (Note: Achintya Bhattacharya), Phani Bora
Bihar	6	Yogendra Sharma, Indradeep Sinha (Note: Indradeep Sinha (1914-2003) Bihar – Secretary of CPI in Bihar 1962-1967, Member of Bihar Legislative Council 1969-1974, Minister in Bihar state government 1967-1968, Member of Rajya Sabha 1974-1986.), Jagannath Sarkar (Note: Jagannath Sarkar), Ali Ashraf, Sunil Mukherjee (Note: Sunil Mukherjee (1914-1992) Bihar - founder-secretary of CPI unit in Bihar 1939-1950, Member of the Bihar Legislative Assembly 1962-1965, 1969-1977, and a member of the Bihar Legislative Council 1967-1969, Leader of the Opposition in the Bihar Legislative Assembly during the 1972-1977 term, secretary of CPI in Bihar 1978-1984.), Karyanand Sharma (Note: Karyanand Sharma)
Delhi	2	Y.D. Sharma, M. Farooqui
Gujerat	2	Dinkar Mehta, Chiman Mehta (Note: Chiman Mehta)
Kerala	16	E.M.S. Namboodiripad, C. Achutha Menon, M.N. Govindan Nair, K. Damodaran, S. Kumaran, C. Unni Raja, P.K. Vasudevan Nair (Note: P.K. Vasudevan Nair), K.K. Warrier, Rosamma Punnoose, E.K. Imbichi Bava (Note: E.K. Imbichi Bava), T.C. Narayanan Nambiar, K.A. Keraleeyan, P. Balachandra Menon (Note: P. Balachandra Menon), C.H. Kanaran (Note: C.H. Kanaran (1909–1972) - National Council member and party leader in northern Kerala, sided with CPI(Left) in the split. One of the main architects of the Land Reforms Act passed by the first Kerala Legislative Assembly. Became the secretary of CPI(Left) in Kerala ahead of the 7th party congress.), C. Janardhanan, V.S. Achuthanandan (Note: V.S. Achuthanandan)
Madhya Pradesh	2	L.R. Khandkar, B.K. Gupta
Maharashtra	6	S.G. Sardesai, Sudam Deshmukh, B.T. Ranadive, S.G. Patkar, Chandra Gupta Choudhury, G. Adhikari
Manipur	2	Thokchom Bira Singh, Thien Meghchandra
Mysore	2	N.L. Upadhyaya, B.V. Kakkilaya (Note: B.V. Kakkilaya)
Orissaz	3	Gokul Mohan Rai Chudamani, Ramakrishna Patti, Gurucharan Patnaik
Punjab	5	Sohan Singh Josh, Harkishan Singh Surjeet, Jagjit Singh Lyallpuri (Note: Jagjit Singh Lyallpuri), Avtar Singh Malhotra (Note: Avtar Singh Malhotra (1917-2005) Punjab – Secretary of CPI in Punjab in 1948, again serving as CPI Punjab secretary in 1964), Master Hari Singh
Rajasthan	2	H.K. Vyas, Mohan Punamia (Note: Mohan Punamia (-1997) Rajasthan - Rajasthan secretary of the All India Trade Union Congress, was detained and jailed 1964-1965 under Defense of India Rules, CPI(M) Rajasthan State Committee secretary, Centre of Indian Trade Unions Rajasthan President (1970). Expelled from CPI(M) in 1981 Punamia. In 1983 he founded a new party, the Marxist Communist Party of India (MCPI). Punamia served as secretary of MCPI. In 1986 he founded the All India Centre of Trade Unions.)
Tamilnad	7	P. Ramamurthi, M.R. Venkataraman, M. Kalyanasundaram, N. Sankariah (Note: N. Sankariah), P. Jeevanandham, B. Srinivasa Rao, K. Ramani (Note: K. Ramani)
Tripura	2	Dasarath Deb, Biren Dutta
Uttar Pradesh	5	Kali Shanker Shukla (Note: Kali Shanker Shukla), Shankar Dayal Tewari (Note: Shankar Dayal Tewari), S.S. Yusuf, Shiv Kumar Mishra (Note: Shiv Kumar Mishra Uttar Pradesh - Member of the 1970 Politburo of the Communist Party of India (Marxist-Leninist).), Jai Bahadur Singh
West Bengal	8	Jyoti Basu, Ranen Sen, Muzaffar Ahmed, Bhowani Sen, Jolly Mohan Kaul, Indrajit Gupta (Note: Indrajit Gupta), Hare Krishna Konar, Somnath Lahiri (Note: Somnath Lahiri (1909-1984) – the sole communist in the 1946 Constituent Assembly, trade unionist, CPI Central Committee member 1933-1950, in the CPI Politburo 1948-1950, Member of the West Bengal Legislative Assembly 1957-1976, minister in the 1967 and 1969 United Front governments in West Bengal.)

The factional conflicts were temporary solved at the 5th Party Congress, held in Amritsar in 1958. Per Kochanek and Hardgrave (2007) the Amritsar thesis 'set forth the nationalist credentials of the CPI'. The Amritsar Party Congress adopted possibility of peaceful transition to socialism, both in terms of strategy and tactics. Whilst the 1956 congress had used careful wordings when talking about the potential for peaceful transition to socialism via combined electoral and mass struggles, Amritsar Party Congress used a much more optimistic discourse when talking about a parliamentary path to socialism - by this point the party felt that the 1957 electoral victory in Kerala could be replicated in other Indian states and eventually the same modality would be used to come to power in Delhi. According to Ram (1977) "Amritsar was the culmination of the long retreat from Telangana and from the 1951 tactical line because in its newfound faith in peaceful change, the CPI was repudiating its tactic of combining peasant partisan warfare with the general strike weapon by the peasant-worker class alliance with the working class as a leader. The 1951 tactical line had at best reiterated a theoretical commitment to this tactic because such a struggle was not part of immediate programme. But Amritsar marked the repudiation of even this theoretical commitment".

As such, the Party Congress stated that CPI 'strives to achieve full Democracy and Socialism by peaceful means. It considers that by developing a powerful mass movement, by winning a majority in Parliament, and by backing it with mass sanctions, the working class and its allies can overcome the resistance of the forces of reaction and insure that Parliament becomes an instrument of people's will for effecting fundamental changes in the economic, social and State structure." Furthermore, the Amritsar thesis argued that '[m]any of the declared policies of the [Indian National] Congress and some of [its] measures are, in today's context, progressive. Moreover, the Amritsar Party Congress outright stated that the 'Communist Party supports the foreign policy of the Indian government and consistently works for strengthening it'.

The Amritsar Party Congress changed the central leadership structure; the Central Committee and Politburo were replaced by three-tier system with a Secretariat, a Central Executive Committee (CEC) and a 101-member National Council - scrapping the traditional communist nomenclature for bourgeois terminology. By instituting a numerically large National Council, the rightists could strengthen their position as hard-line elements would be diluted. In the Party Congress documents, Dange was listed as no. 2 in the newly elected party leadership whilst Namboodiripad was listed as no. 15.

==== Dismissal of the Kerala Government ====
Whilst forming the Kerala state government in 1957 had strengthened the argument for parliamentary politics, the 1959 ousting of the Namboodiripad cabinet refueled debates inside the party on tactics and strategy. After the 1960 Kerala Legislative Assembly election, which CPI lost, Namboodiripad affirmed that the party would act as a constructive legislative opposition party but emphasized that the 1959 ousting proved that the Indian National Congress would never allow a peaceful handover of power.

=== Border tensions: 1959 ===
==== Longju incident ====
During the 1959 rebellion in Tibet, CPI criticized the Nehru government for being biased in favour of the rebellion. Few months later, in August 1959 Nehru made a statement claiming Chinese troops had entered Ladakh and the North-East Frontier Agency. Almost immediately as the border conflict emerged, a storm of censure within was directed at CPI as critics sought to portray the party as a fifth column of China. Many local units of CPI sought to downplay the border dispute, arguing in favour of peaceful solution to the border conflict. Following the Longju incident, the CPI CEC resolution sought to take the middle ground, expressing confidence in non-aggressive character of China whilst committing to India's territorial integrity. According to Nossiter, the resolution dissatisfied both the "internationalist Left" and the "nationalist Right" inside the party. And on 7 September 1959 Zhou Enlai declared that China didn't recognize the McMahon line.

As the central CPI party leadership hadn't confronted the public backlash by issuing a statement unequivocally supporting the Indian government's territorial claims, discontent simmered in the party ranks (in particular among the parliamentary representatives of the party). Initially the dissidents managed to remain within the limits of party discipline, but later their dissent turned into an open rebellion. The parliamentary representatives feared that the advances of the party in the 1957 elections would be reverted if the party appeared as siding with China in the border dispute.

==== Calcutta resolution ====
The CPI CEC met in Calcutta in late September 1959. At the Calcutta meeting some parliamentary leaders and regional party leaders from Bombay and Kerala wanted the party to publicly support Nehru's position on the border issue, in particular to reaffirm the McMahon line as the Sino-Indian border. The meeting was heated and lasted for 5 days (it had initially been planned to last for 3 days). The rightist Dange, who was encouraged by the Soviet statement of neutrality on the Sino-Indian dispute, criticized Chinese actions and requested that the party should declare support for the Nehru government on the Sino-Indian border issue. Dange's demand included recognition of the McMahon line. The leftists in the CEC argued that Dange's position constituted a violation of the principles of proletarian internationalism.

Reportedly Ghosh returned from Moscow in haste to arrive in Calcutta to mediate between the factions. A resolution was adopted which sought to find a balance between the factions in the party, on one hand affirming that CPI would be in the forefront to defend India but also arguing that the crisis was being aggravated by Indian reactionaries. The resolution did not affirm the McMahon line as the border between the two countries. Soon after the Calcutta meeting, a five-member delegation led by Ghosh left for Peking to attend the celebrations of the 10th anniversary of the People's Republic of China.

==== In the Samyukta Maharashtra Samiti ====
On 7 October 1959 the Parliamentary Board of the Samyukta Maharashtra Samiti (SMS, a Maharashtrian regional coalition in which CPI participated) issued a statement calling for a return to the Status Quo of 1954, affirming the McMahon line as the 'natural boundary' between the two countries and accused China of occupying Indian territory. The SMS resolution placed CPI in a dilemma, since the SMS resolution and the CPI September 1959 Calcutta resolution clashed on several key points. The Maharashtrian communists were threatened with expulsion from SMS if they didn't vote in favour of the statement. The Maharashtrian communists voted in favour of the statement, but were notably worried that the action had violated the CPI party line. Per Varkey (1974) it is probable that Dange, who was the chairman of the SMS Parliamentary Board, felt the need to issue a clarifying statement of his own. Dange's statement affirmed that the SMS resolution supported the McMahon line and identified that border violations had been committed, but that the SMS resolution had not sought to portray China as the sole responsible party of the conflict.

Dange's 'clarification' was immediately rejected by the Praja Socialist Party, another SMS constituent, who called the clarification a 'naive attempt' to reconcile the 'wellknown treachery' of CPI with the position of SMS. On 14 October 1959 the executive of the CPI unit in Maharashtra endorsed the SMS resolution and Dange's clarification, framing the SMS resolution as a compromise between the different parties of the coalition. The 14 October 1959 statement of the CPI Maharashtra executive affirmed that all SMS partners were in favour of peaceful negotiations on the basis of the McMahon line. The explicit acceptance of the McMahon by the Maharashtra CPI unit was an unambiguous deviation of from the central party line.

==== Kongka Pass incident ====
As Ghosh returned to Delhi, he affirmed to the Indian press that in conversations with Chinese leaders in Peking the latter had committed to a peaceful resolution of the border issue. But a second border incident occurred at Kongka Pass (Ladakh) 20–21 October 1959 in which 9 Indian soldiers were killed during a confrontation with the Chinese military. The incident further exposed divisions within CPI. Dange made a statement condemning China, and stated unequivocal support to Nehru in "whatever [further] steps he takes to avert such incidents". Dange's statement was echoed by A.K. Gopalan (Deputy Leader of CPI in the Lok Sabha), Hirendranath Mukherjee (Deputy Leader of CPI in the Rajya Sabha) and Jharkhande Rai (Note: Jharkhande Rai) (Leader of CPI faction in the Uttar Pradesh Legislative Assembly) in expressing 'anger and outrage' over Chinese actions. The CPI unit in Poona condemned Chinese actions. On 23 October 1959 Hindustan Times reported discontent among CPI units in Trivandrum, Ahmedabad, Amritsar, Patiala, Delhi and Hardwar over the Chinese actions in the border conflict.

Khrushchev expressed regret over the Ladakh incident and called for negotiations between India and China. Khruschev's statement emboldened the CPI rightists to call for revising the Calcutta CEC resolution and condemn the Chinese actions.

The CPI Secretariat and CEC met in late October 1959, and resolved to accept the McMahon line as the Sino-Indian border. Notably Ghosh in had failed to convince the CCP to commit to de-escalating border tensions during his visit to Peking earlier the same month. A CPI Secretariat statement was issued on 24 October 1959. The statement was somewhat milder that the public statement done by Dange, it labelled the Chinese action as 'unjustified' and expressed that CPI shared 'the feelings of deep resentment and indignation of the Indian people' regarding the 'heavy loss of life' in the incident. Within the Secretariat there had been two suggestions for amendments to the statement, but both were rejected - Z.A. Ahmed had called expressing stronger disapproval of Chinese action whilst Joshi had proposed highlighting the potential role of provocateurs and imperialist forces in aggravating the crisis. The 'internationalist' trend in the party was dissatisfied with acceptance of McMahon line as party policy.

==== National Council meeting: Meerut ====
In early November 1959 the CPI National Council met in Meerut. The Meerut meeting would last for a week. At the Meerut meeting the group hostile towards China began to gain influence in the party. Dange repeated his demand that CPI should recognize the McMahon Line as the Indian border. The meeting adopted the 'nationalist' position for the McMahon line as basis for negotiations between the two countries became party policy, but the meeting also approved the 'internationalist' position that acceptance of territorial claims shouldn't be a precondition for negotiations. The Meerut meeting also censured Dange and two other CPI leaders in Samyukta Maharashtra Samiti, S.S. Mirajkar and S.G. Sardesai, for violation of party discipline.

The resolution of the Meerut meeting sought to reconcile both sides inside the party. All sectors in the party, except the 'internationalist' hardliners in West Bengal, agreed on the agreed with the 'nationalist' position for McMahon line as basis for negotiations. But the Meerut meeting didn't resolve the dispute in the party, the West Bengal communists maintained their positions whilst the Maharashtra communists refused to endorse the censuring of Dange, Mirajkar and Sardesai.

==== Three standpoints on the border issue ====
According to Stern, by this point the party was divided into were three factions on the border dispute;

- 'Nationalists' - a group who wanted CPI to 'unequivocally' support the McMahon line as India's border and that the party should support Nehru government in its foreign policy. Per the 'nationalists', it was important to support Nehru on border issue to curb influence of reactionaries in Indian politics. Per Stern the 'nationalists' had the upper hand in the Maharashtra and Kerala, and it had support from leaders from Andhra Pradesh and Uttar Pradesh and scattered support in other states. Dange was the most outspoken leader of the group, whilst Namboodiripad wanted to retain criticisms within the internal party forums.
- 'Internationalists' - a group who opposed support to Nehru government in confrontation with China on ideological and tactical grounds, arguing that capitulating to Nehru would be used by reactionaries to neutralize CPI in domestic politics. The 'Internationalists' wished to retain the September 1959 Calcutta statement as CPI policy. The 'internationalists' were the dominant faction in the West Bengal party unit. They were also strong in Punjab, and had supporters in all state units.
- 'Centrists' - a group that worked to maintain party unity. This group was centered around Ghosh.

Per Stern there was some correlation between the leftist trend in the party and 'internationalist' posture on the border issue and between the rightist trend and 'nationalist' group, but that it wasn't possible to equate the leftists with the 'internationalists' nor the rightists with the 'nationalists'. There were several prominent exceptions to this pattern - for example the leftist Ranadive and rightist Joshi were aligned together in 'internationalist' group. The leftist C. Rajeshwara Rao was in 'nationalist' group, although Dange had helped the centrist Ghosh to oust Rao in 1951. And so forth. Per Stern it appeared that CPI leaders involved in mass fronts tended to lean more towards the 'nationalists', with the exception for peasants front.

Stern's study categorizes the positions on the border issue of 34 prominent CPI politicians based on press citations. In Stern's study Dange (Maharashtra), Sardesai (Maharashtra), C. Rajeshwara Rao (Andhra Pradesh), Bhowani Sen (West Bengal), Gopalan (Kerala), Mirajkar (Maharashtra), Jai Bahadur Singh (Uttar Pradesh), Rai (Uttar Pradesh), Ram Asrey (Note: Ram Asrey) (Uttar Pradesh), Hirendranath Mukherjee (West Bengal), V.D. Chitale (Note: V.D. Chitale (1906-1961) Maharashtra - CPI leader in Poona city., Sanskrit scholar, led a 1955 satyagrah march to Goa, elected to the Bombay Legislative Assembly in the 1957 election, part of the Samyukta Maharashtra Samiti bloc in the Legislative Assembly.) (Maharashtra), P.K. Vasudevan Nair (Kerala), Renu Chakravartty (West Bengal), S.S. Yusuf (Uttar Pradesh) and Rustom Satin (Uttar Pradesh) were exclusively designated as 'nationalists' (with a declining order of citations - Dange having 31 citations, Satin 1 citation). CPI leaders exclusively designated as 'internationalists' in Stern's study were P. Sundarayya (Andhra Pradesh), Avtar Singh Malhotra (Punjab), Indrajit Gupta (West Bengal), M. Basavapunniah (Andhra Pradesh), Achintya Bhattacharya (Assam), P. Ramamurthi (Madras), Jolly Mohan Kaul (Note: Jolly Mohan Kaul) (West Bengal), N. Prasada Rao (Andhra Pradesh) and Ranen Sen (West Bengal).

The remaining 9 CPI leaders covered by Stern's study appear in more than one category on the border issue, conveying the prevailing confusion and fluid nature of the controversy;

- Z.A. Ahmed (Uttar Pradesh) is described as 'nationalist' in 13 citations and 'centrist' in 1 citation.
- M. N. Govindan Nair (Kerala) is described as 'nationalist' in 6 citations whilst appearing as 'centrist' in 1 citation.
- H.K. Vyas is described both as a 'nationalist' (2 citations) and a 'centrist' (1 citation).
- Namboodiripad is described as 'nationalist' by 17 citations, 'internationalist' by 2 citations and 'centrist' by 1 citation.
- Ghosh described as 'centrist' (12 citations), 'nationalist' (1 citation) and 'internationalist' (2 citations).
- Gupta described as 'nationalist' (1 citation), 'internationalist' (2 citations) and 'centrist' (1 citation). However per Stern, Gupta was 'nationalist' compared to rest of West Bengal unit.
- Ranadive is described as 'internationalist' (16 citations), 'centrist' (3 citations) and 'nationalist' (1 citation)
- Surjeet is described as 'internationalist' (8 citations) and 'centrist' (4 citations).
- Basu is described as 'internationalist' (7 citations) and 'centrist' (1 citation). However, Stern notes that Basu voiced support for the Indian government military policy in October 1962, before National Council statement.

== The split ==
According to Singh (1994) the split can be divided into three stages; before the 1962 war, the 1962–1964 split and the consolidation of the two parties 1964–1967.

=== Before the Sino-Indian War ===
==== An ailing general secretary ====
The CPI leftists had accepted Dange as the new leader of the Lok Sabha group. But they did not accept Dange as the tentative successor to Ghosh as the party general secretary. As the Kerala government had been dismissed, Namboodiripad was again available to function as the acting general secretary during Ghosh's absences. During the November 1959 CEC and May 1960 National Council meetings, when the issue of Ghosh's medical leaves was discussed, the leftists opposed Dange as being designated as the acting general secretary.

==== Bucharest and Peking Conferences: 1960 ====
In April 1960 the Chinese publication Red Flag published the article 'Long Live Leninism!', which sharply attacked CPSU in ideological terms. The tensions between CCP and CPSU further escalated in June 1960, as conferences were held in Peking and Bucharest.

At the Bucharest Conference of Representatives of Communist and Workers Parties Khruschev called the Chinese actions in the Sino-Indian border conflict a 'stab in the back' against the communist movement in the 'Afro-Asian world'. CPI was represented at Bucharest by M. Basavapunnaiah and Gupta. The Indian delegation took a neutral stand in the Sino-Soviet dispute at the conference. By contrast Dange fully defended the Soviet party at the World Conference of the World Federation of Trade Unions held the same month in Peking.

In September 1960, following Khruschev's statements in Bucharest, the CPI National Council issued a resolution stating that "China has lost the sympathy of millions of Indians in return for a few miles of worthless territory", whilst also including criticisms of Indian government postures. The resolution caused resentment among sections of the party - the West Bengal unit stated that National Council resolution appeased Indian chauvinism and the Punjab unit called for its withdrawal.

==== Hanoi Congress ====
The Workers Party of Vietnam held its third national party congress in Hanoi September 5–12, 1960. The CPI was represented at the Hanoi congress by K. Damodaran and Hare Krishna Konar. Allegedly, Ghosh had instructed the two delegates to stay away from contact with the Chinese delegation at Hanoi. Damodaran refused to meet with Chinese delegation, but Konar met with them and accepted their invitation to visit Peking immediately after the Hanoi congress. In Peking Konar met Mao and other leaders. Upon his return to India he argued for CCP positions on border issue as well as the wider ideological conflict between CPSU and CCP. Per Ray, this was first direct attempt by CCP to gain influence inside the CPI.

==== Moscow Conference ====
Ahead of November 1960 International Meeting of Communist and Workers Parties in Moscow, CPI had to position itself as tensions grew between CCP and CPSU. CPI issued a statement that criticised CCP for 'basically wrong assessment' on situation in India and for not having consulted with CPI. Ghosh led a 5-member CPI delegation at the Moscow conference. The CPI delegation was received by Mikhail Suslov (Note: Mikhail Suslov (1902 - 1982) - Member of the Orgburo of the Communist Party of the Soviet Union (CPSU) 1946-1952, secretary of the Central Committee in charge of the Agitprop Department 1947-1949, chairman of Cominform 1948-1953, Editor-in-Chief of Pravda 1949-1950, Member of the Presidium of the Supreme Soviet 1950-1954, Chairman of Foreign Affairs Commission of the Supreme Soviet from 1954, from 1952 again secretary of the Central Committee and a member of the CPSU Presidium (later Politburo), seen as the CPSU chief ideologue), who criticized the CPI for its opposition to China on the border issue. At the conference, Ghosh's speech took a conciliatory tone towards both CPSU and CCP, but indicated support for Soviet position in the ideological dispute and criticized the CCP its posture on the Sino-Indian border issue.

==== January 1961 National Council meeting ====
The CPI National Council met in January 1961. At the meeting there was a call to withdraw the Meerut resolution, motivated by Suslov's advice in Moscow to revise the anti-China policies of CPI. Ghosh, supported by the right-wing in the National Council, was able to defeat this demand. Following the meeting Promode Dasgupta (Note: Promode Dasgupta), the West Bengal state secretary of the party, circulated a document titled Revisionist Trend in the CPI. Dasgupta's document accused Ghosh of surrender to imperialist and bourgeois interests, and called on CPI to follow the lead of the CCP.

==== Sixth Party Congress: Vijayawada ====
The Sixth CPI Party Congress was held in Vijayawada in April 1961. In February 1961, ahead of the Vijayawada Party Congress, the CPI National Council endorsed Ghosh's draft political resolution to be presented at the Vijayawada Party Congress, but the National Council also decided to allow a leftist alternative document (authored by Ranadive) and a document written by Namboodiripad (criticizing both the leftist and rightist positions) to be circulated.

It had been expected that the Vijayawada Party Congress would be site of confrontation between the CPI factions. The two main factions clashed harshly in the debates. The Right's position was that the Indian National Congress had both progressive and reactionary sections, and that CPI should support progressive sector of Indian National Congress within a National Democratic Front led by working class. The Left's position was that the role of the Indian National Congress was not entirely negative, but that it was reactionary and should be opposed. The Left argued that CPI should work for People's Democracy, and build unity among democratic forces under working class leadership. Namboodiripad represented a third position, that bourgeoisie was divided between monopoly capital (foreign and domestic) and an anti-imperialist/anti-feudal sections. Per Namboodiripad the CPI should seek to win over the anti-imperialist and anti-feudal sectors of bourgeoisie.

The question of election of the party leadership involved complexities regarding the party hierarchy. Namboodiripad was again the identified the default acting general secretary but Dange had a strong position as the Lok Sabha leader of the party. And the leftists threatened to withdraw from the Party Congress unless they gained more representation in the central leadership bodies. The leftists also demanded that some rightist be excluded from the new CEC. Neither leftists nor rightist wanted to make any concessions on the question of party leadership.

For the first time the CPSU was represented by a formal delegation at a CPI Party Congress. The Soviet delegate Suslov personally mediated between the groups. Together with Ghosh they managed to get the factions to agree on a policy of 'unity and struggle' towards the Indian government. With Suslov's backing, Dange's line of national democratic front prevailed albeit with modifications. The political resolution and Ghosh's speech were endorsed unanimously. The two alternate drafts where withdrawn, seemingly in exchange for amendments to the main draft (adding anti-Indian National Congress/anti-Nehru wordings). Upon Namboodiripad's suggestion, the party postponed the revision of the party program.

Through Suslov's intervention the party constitution was changed, whereby the number of National Council members increased from 101 to 110 in order to accommodate more leftists. The enlarged National Council included 56 members belonging to the Right, 36 to the Left and 18 aligned with Namboodiripad. It was agreed that the election for a new CEC and Secretariat would be deferred for three months and decided by the National Council. The list of elected leaders had Ghosh's name mentioned first, Dange second and Namboodiripad third.

However, in the end the Vijayawada Party Congress was inconclusive and didn't resolve the tensions in the party. The rightists had achieved a majority, but it was a very slim one. Once the new Secretariat was constituted, Namboodiripad was excluded from it. The five members of the post-Vijayawada Secretariat were Dange, Z.A. Ahmad, M.N. Govindan Nair, Sharma and Gupta. Around this period there was a move to create a new centre around Gupta, which would prioritize revolutionary struggle but not accepting CCP positions completely.

By contrast to the role played by the Soviet delegation, there was no Chinese delegation at Vijayawada. According to Rai (1990), the Sino-Soviet split played no prominent role in the Vijayawada Party Congress, and that no section within CPI looked for political guidance from the CCP.

==== November 1961 border tensions ====
In November 1961 Nehru issued a new statement alleging further Chinese incursions. Ghosh issued a statement, calling on Chinese to stop such acts and take actions to avoid such situations in the future. In response People's Daily carried an editorial attacking Ghosh; stating that he 'trailed behind Nehru' and that he had not bothered to get the facts of the situation before making a public statement. The People's Daily editorial inflamed tensions in CPI. Ghosh reacted by pledging CPI support to Nehru to repel Chinese military actions.

==== Death of Ghosh ====
Ghosh died in January 1962, and his death put the question on party leadership to the forefront. Both Dange and Namboodiripad vied for post as general secretary. Effectively campaigning for their respective candidatures, the two leaders made sure to author several articles for the New Age weekly.

In April 1962 the CPI National Council met to decide on how to resolve the general secretary vacancy. There were sharp contradictions at the meeting. The right-wing insisted on Dange as new general secretary, the left-wing refused to accept him. In the end the CPI National Council reached a compromise solution; Namboodiripad was named as the new general secretary whilst Dange was named as party chairman (a new post created as part of the compromise). A new Secretariat was constituted with 3 leftists, 3 rightists and 3 centrists. The inclusion of three additional Secretariat members, P. Sundarayya, Surjeet and Basu, was a concession to the left-wing. Sharma (1978) compared the April 1962 phase in the CPI factional conflict with the May 1922 factional tensions in Soviet Russia, when a collective leadership was formed around Stalin, Kamenev and Zinoviev.

However this compromise was inherently unsustainable as Namboodiripad and Dange were strongly opposed to each other. The lack of a defined division of labour between the posts of chairman and general secretariat would increase tensions, as both Dange and Namboodiripad tried to position themselves as the foremost leader of the party. And this precarious balance was upset when war broke out with China later the same year.

=== Cracks appear ===
==== Sino–Indian War and internment ====
On 20 October 1962 a new confrontation at border marked the beginning of the Sino-Indian War. Again, CPI was placed in difficult position. The party chairman Dange and other rightist leaders quickly denounced Chinese action. However, the official CPI statement was delayed for 11 days due to internal discussions. During these 11 days, there were two significant developments in the international sphere - on 25 October 1962 Pravda reversed its position (reportedly due to the Cuban Missile Crisis) and voiced support to China against India, calling for repudiation of McMahon Line and urging restraint among Indian progressives. And on 27 October 1962 People's Daily responded to the Soviet olive branch by denouncing Nehru as an imperialist agent and insulted Dange by labeling him as a 'self-styled Marxist-Leninist' who followed Nehru's instructions. People's Daily insisted that the Soviet Union must abandon its friendly relations with the Nehru government. Following this brief interlude the Soviet Union would support the Indian side in the war, boosting Dange position in the conflict within the party.

On 1 November 1962, after two days of heated debates, the CPI National Council issued a statement titled Unite to Defend the Motherland against China's Open Aggression, which took an unequivocally 'nationalist' position on the border conflict. The statement branded China as the aggressor, rejected Chinese territorial claims and voiced support for the Nehru government to purchase armaments to confront the Chinese military.

Almost a third of the National Council members had voted against adopting the statement. Many CPI members, especially in West Bengal, opposed to the position of the National Council on the border conflict. Three Secretariat members resigned in protest against the statement, whilst the remainder of the CPI Secretariat (including Namboodiripad) drafted a letter to the communist parties around the world to explain the CPI position on the border conflict. The letter asked the communist parties around the world to pressure the CCP for restraint in the border conflict. Dange travelled to Moscow and to the capitals of other Eastern European countries, to advocate for the CPI position. Before his departure, he met Nehru and Lal Bahadur Shastri.

According to Dutt (1971) it appeared that the CCP had expected on that CPI would support its actions in the border conflict, seeing it as confrontation between a socialist state and a non-socialist state. An editorial in People's Daily recalled how 'Kuomintang reactionaries' had attacked the Soviet Union 1927-1929 and how the Chinese communists had sided with the Soviets against the Chinese reactionaries. Per Dutt, CPI did not appreciate this analogy; neither the comparison between Nehru and the Kuomintang nor in the notion that the Nehru government alone would have been responsible for the border clashes.

The 1962 war put the opponents of the pro-Indian National Congress line within CPI in a precarious situation, as they were branded as 'Pro-China'. The group sought to maintain that their opposition to the China policy of the Nehru government was in line with their opposition to the Indian National Congress government as it represented interests of class enemies.

On 22 November 1962 the Indian government arrested some 1,000 leftists under the Defense of India Ordinance. Most of the detained belonged to the CPI left-wing. Many were held in prison until late 1963. In Kerala, the arrested included five former CPI ministers, among them the centrist Namboodiripad (who was released after one week) and the rightist C. Achutha Menon. In West Bengal, cadres of the Socialist Unity Centre of India and the Workers Party of India were also detained.

The arrests further deepened the split in CPI. CPI leftists alleged that the rightists in the party had supplied Home Ministry with lists of leftists, to facilitate the arrests. Per Judge (1992) names of supposedly 'pro-China' party members were provided to the government by indirect means. The arrests aided Dange to strengthen his control over the party organizationally and ideologically. With the leftist leaders in jail, the rightists seized the opportunity to reorganize the Punjab and West Bengal state units of the party.

==== February 1963 National Council meeting ====
The rightists also seized the opportunity of the leftists' absence to push for new resolutions at the February 1963 CPI National Council meeting. At this point out of 108 living National Council members, 48 were in prison or underground. A February 1963 National Council statement again denounced Chinese 'aggression' and stated that CCP had violated the principles of Marxism-Leninism. Furthermore, Dange presented a resolution on the Sino-Soviet rift and the reorganization of the West Bengal and Punjab units of the party. According to the publication Thought, Dange's resolution was fiercely resisted by Namboodiripad, Gopalan, Dinkar Mehta, Chiman Mehta and Y.D. Sharma. But Gupta, who otherwise had hostile relations with Dange, 'threw in a somersault' and sided with the majority at the meeting.

Namboodiripad had tabled an alternative resolution at the meeting, titled Revisionism and Dogmatism in the CPI. Namboodiripad's document sought to highlight past and current errors, criticizing the rightist leadership for subservience to the Indian National Congress government and calling on CPI to remain neutral in the Sino-Soviet dispute. Namboodiripad's resolution was rejected by the National Council and Namboodiripad resigned from the post as general secretary of the party, citing his concerns with the 'nationalist' postures of the party. P. Sundarayya, Surjeet and Basu also resigned from the CPI Secretariat and CEC. Namboodiripad would later accept to withdraw his resignation, but with P. Sundarayya, Basu and Surjeet out of the picture the rightists had a total control over the Secretariat. Namboodiripad found himself completely isolated in the Secretariat. The rightists used their control over the Secretariat to induct more of their own loyalists at the party headquarters and in state units.

CCP responded to the CPI National Council resolution by denouncing Dange as a 'Titoist revisionist' and called for support to the left-wing within CPI. Dange replied to the CCP comment some six weeks later, in a 30,000 word editorial in New Age titled Neither Revisionism nor Dogmatism Is Our Guide. In August 1963 Dange visited Moscow as a guest of the CPSU. During his stay Pravda published an article denouncing CCP leadership for "aggressive policy" and for "openly interfering" in CPI internal affairs.

==== Anticipating the split ====
During 1963 the CPI left-wing, with Gopalan as one of its key leaders, was building up parallel party structure. And the left-wing was boosted when many of their leaders were released from jail in late 1963. When many of the CPI left-wing leaders were released from jail in 1963, they encountered a situation where the Dange group had excluded them from their leadership functions. The leftists responded by grouping together and continued building their own parallel party structures. Rightists decried these moves as violations of party discipline.

In October 1963, a group of 17 CPI National Council members issued a resolution titled The Threatening Disruption and Split of the Party - How to Avert the Disaster. Namboodiripad and Basu worked to promote a compromise solution and party unity before and during the January 1964 CEC meeting.

In January 1964 the leader of CPI in Madras P. Ramamurthi resigned in protest against the decision to support the Indian National Congress in municipal elections. In the same month the Indonesian communist leader D.N. Aidit (Note: D.N. Aidit (1923-1965) - Chairman of the Communist Party of Indonesia (PKI) 1959-1965, PKI Central Committee member in 1947, PKI Politburo member in 1948, under his chairmanship PKI membership grew to some 3 million, killed in the violent 1965 purge.) called on Indian communists to set up a rival organization to the 'Dangeite clique'. The January 1964 CEC meeting (dominated by right-wing) issued a circular to party members to resist attempts by Chinese and Indonesian communist leaders to influence the party. On 27 March 1964 P. Sundarayya and T. Nagi Reddy issued a statement from Hyderabad, accusing the rightists of abusing the arrests to seize control over the party machinery.

=== Two parties ===
==== Dange Letters: March 1964 ====
After years of tensions inside the party, the last straw were the so-called 'Dange Letters'. The letters were encountered by Dwijen Nandi, a CPI leftist and journalist for Swadhinata, whilst he was researching files at the National Archives of India. In the four letters, allegedly authored by Dange in 1924 whilst he was imprisoned for political reasons and addressed to the Viceroy of India, Dange sought to negotiate terms of his release from jail. Per Sharma (1978) the letters, if authentic, would have indicated that Dange had "offered to act as an agent of the British government in return for remission of his jail sentence". The anti-communist Bombay weekly The Current published the letters on 7 March 1964. The letters caused an outcry in the party, and the CPI leftists and some centrists called for an inquiry into the authenticity of the documents. S.S. Mirajkar, who had been tried and sentenced in the Meerut Conspiracy Case along with the Dange, claimed he had seen the letters and vouched for their authenticity.

On 13 March 1964 the CPI Secretariat labelled the documents as a 'deliberate forgery' and accused the CPI leftists of having circulated the documents. The Dange group claimed that the forged documents has been planted in the National Archives by a bourgeois agent. And in response to the controversy two of Dange's associates, Renu Chakravarty and 'Ferishta' (possibly referring to Chakravarty's husband, Nikhilnath Chakravarty) argued that the letters were forged, since they carried the spelling 'Shripat' whereas Dange had always written his name as 'Shirpad'.

In the atmosphere of increased tensions, the group around Dange portrayed the anti-Dange tirade as a destructive move, effectively equating criticism of the chairman with criticism of the party. The rightists began organizing disciplinary processes against leftists, the leftists responded by conveying that such measures would split the party into two.

The CPI CEC met on 9 April 1964. The leftists and centrists wanted to move an agenda point on the Dange Letters. The rightists, in contrast, wanted to move an agenda point on disruptive activities of 'anti-party elements' (i.e. the CPI leftists). As the meeting commenced the leftists and centrists demanded that the Dange Letters issue be debated first and that Dange should step down from chairing the meeting whilst issue would be discussed. Dange refused to comply, and 12 out of 27 CEC members left the meeting in protest. The nine of the CEC members walking out belonged to the leftist trend (Gopalan, Basavapunniah, Konar, Promode Dasgupta, Sundarayya, Ramamurthi, Venkataraman, Surjeet and Jagjit Singh Lyallpuri), whilst three belonged to the centrist trend (Namboodiripad, Basu and Gupta). Per Mallick (1994), Dange pushed the centrists into the leftist fold by refusing to compromise regarding the meeting agenda.

==== National Council meeting: April 1964 ====
The CPI National Council met on 11 April 1964. Just as two days earlier, the stage was set for a dispute about the Dange Letters and Dange's role. Dange again refused to vacate his chair during a debate on the letters, and 32 out of the 65 attending National Council members stormed out in protest accusing Dange and his followers of 'anti-unity and anti-Communist policies'.

The 32 dissident National Council members that staged the walk-out were P. Sundarayya, M. Basavapunniah, T. Nagi Reddy, M. Hanumantha Rao, D.V. Rao, N. Prasad Rao, G. Bapanaiah, Namboodiripad, Gopalan, A.V. Kunhambu (Note: A.V. Kunhambu), C.H. Kanaran, E.K. Nayanar (Note: E.K. Nayanar), V.S. Achuthanandan, E.K. Imbichi Bava, Promode Dasgupta, Muzaffar Ahmad, Basu, Abdul Halim (Note: Abdul Halim (1901-1966) West Bengal – Organized CPI whilst Muzaffar Ahmed was jailed 1929-1936, founder of Ganashakti Publishing House.), Konar, Saroj Mukherjee (Note: Saroj Mukherjee), P. Ramamurthi, M.R. Venkataraman, N. Sankariah, K. Ramani, Surjeet, Lyallpuri, Dalip Singh Tapiala, Bhag Singh (Note: Bhag Singh), Shiv Kumar Mishra, R.N. Upadhyaya, Mohan Punamia and R.P. Saraf (Note: R.P. Saraf (1924-2009) Jammu-Kashmir – Member of the Executive of the Jammu & Kashmir National Conference, Member of the 1952 Constituent Assembly of Jammu and Kashmir, Member of the Jammu-Kashmir Legislative Assembly 1957-1962, general secretary of the Democratic National Conference which became aligned with CPI, editor of Jammu Sandesh, Member of the 1970 Politburo of the Communist Party of India (Marxist-Leninist), led his own Naxalite faction after the disintegration of CPI(ML), founded the International Democratic Party in the 1980s.). Of the 32, 7 were from Kerala, 6 from Andhra Pradesh, 6 from West Bengal, 4 from Madras, 4 from Punjab, 2 from Uttar Pradesh, 1 from Rajasthan and 1 from Jammu-Kashmir. Whilst Gupta had earlier resigned from the CPI Secretariat and joined the 9 April 1964 CPI CEC walk-out protest, he stayed with the CPI rightists at this juncture. Furthermore, the publication Thought claimed that at least ten 'leftists' had remained in the National Council meeting to the end, counting among them Dinkar Mehta (Gujarat), Josh (Punjab) and Y.D. Sharma (Delhi).

After walking out, the 32 gathered at Gopalan's residence at 4, Windsor Place. The 32 issued an appeal on 14 April 1964, condemning the 'reformist political line' and 'factionalism' of the Dange group. On 15 April 1964 the suspended leftists issued a draft for a new party programme. Namboodiripad also issued a separate draft of his own. Subsequently, the National Council suspended the 32. Immediately after the suspension of the 32, the National Council dispatched leaders across the country to convince state units to remain loyal. The dissidents were organizing party units across the country, declaring any Dange loyalists expelled from the party.

Among those National Council members that remained in CPI (or the CPI(Right) as it became known) there was animosity between followers of Dange, Joshi and Gupta. Both Joshi and Gupta had previously attacked Dange on many occasions.

==== Last attempt at unity ====
In June 1964 the CPI(Right) offered to lift the suspension of the 32 National Council members, if the leftists dissolve their organizational structures. A last-ditch effort to retain the party united was done on 4 July 1964 at the residence of Gupta. C. Rajeshwara Rao, Adhikari and Gupta, all CPI Secretariat members, attended on behalf of the right faction and Basu, Surjeet and Promode Dasgupta on behalf of the left faction. According to Wood (1965), the leftists were ready to accept that Dange as chairman if Namboodiripad was reinstated as general secretary but this offer was rejected by the rightists. Other issues of contention were the rightist demand that the leftists close down their press outlets and the leftist demand that party membership scrutiny be instituted.

==== Divisions in the national leadership and rank-and-file ====
In the 1964 split 15 out of 27 CEC members sided with the CPI(Right); Dange, Z.A. Ahmed, Gupta, M.N. Govindan Nair, Joshi, N. Rajasekhara Reddy, Bhowani Sen, K. Damodran, Chandra, Josh, Sardesai, Sharma, Bora, C. Rajeshwara Rao and Ram Krishan Patti. Out of the 12 CEC members that had staged the 9 April 1964 walk-out protest only Gupta stayed with the CPI right. In addition to the other eleven CEC members of the 9 April 1964 walk-out protest, the CPI(Left) also counted the CEC member Ranadive, who in jail as of April 1964, among its adherents. 39 out of 107 members of the National Council of the undivided CPI joined the CPI(Left).

In the Lok Sabha faction its leader Gopalan sided with the CPI(Left) whilst its deputy leader Hirendranath Mukherjee sided with the right CPI. In the Rajya Sabha both the CPI faction leader Gupta and deputy leader M.N Govindan Nair sided with the right CPI. With the 1964 split the CPI(Left) and the CPI(Right) would form separate parliamentary groups. By late 1964 the CPI(Right) group had 18 Lok Sabha deputies, CPI Left 11 deputies and 3 deputies remained undecided. According to Crouch (1966), out of 205 state assembly legislators of the undivided CPI 112 had sided with CPI(Right), 72 with CPI(Left) and the remainder being undecided. Out of the 72 CPI(Left) assembly legislators, 63 were from Kerala, Andhra Pradesh and West Bengal. Sharma (1978) argues that there is no evidence that split would have been a clash between the parliamentary or organizational wings of the undivided CPI, as the top leaderships in parliament and legislatures were divided evenly. The CPI(Right) headquarters, however, claimed that out of 170 legislators, only 49 had sided with the CPI(Left). According to The Statesman in October 1964 legislators in Bihar, Uttar Pradesh, Orissa and Madhya Pradesh overwhelmingly sided with the CPI(Right).

Gough and Sharma (1973) argues that "the urban elite, most of the intellectual leaders, and the trade union functionaries" sided with the CPI(Right) while "most grassroots leaders who had live links with the masses" sided with the CPI(Left). At the Calcutta Party Congress, the CPI(Left) claimed that the 422 delegates represented 104,421 party members, i.e. 60% of the total pre-split CPI membership. On the other side, the CPI(Right) claimed to have 107,763 party members arguing that only 30% of the undivided CPI had sided with the CPI(Left). Independent estimates of the size of the memberships of the parties varied widely, with a U.S. State Department source estimating the left CPI membership at around 70,000 and the right CPI membership at around 55,000).

==== Tenali convention: July 1964 ====
The Namboodiripad and the leftists campaigned in party organizations and within mass organizations across the country, mobilizing for party convention in Tenali in July 1964. 146 delegates, 20 of whom represented Kerala, gathered at the Tenali convention held 7–11 July 1964. The delegates claimed to represent some 100,000 party members. The Tenali convention formalized the constitution of the CPI(Left) as a separate party.

A convention had a three-member presidium - Gopalan, Basu and Shiv Verma. In his speech at the convention, the veteran communist leader Muzaffar Ahmad called on the delegates to swear an oath to forge a 'real communist party'. The CPI(Left) branded CPI(Right) as 'revisionist'. The Tenali convention called for making arrangements for a 7th Party Congress in Calcutta in October 1964. The gathering called on the Government of India to communicate directly with the Chinese leadership in order to break the deadlock in the border dispute. Marking a stark difference from the Dangeite right-wing CPI, the Tenali convention was marked by the display of a large portrait of Mao along with the portraits of Karl Marx, Friedrich Engels, Lenin and Stalin.

At the Tenali convention a Bengal-based pro-CCP group, representing one of the most radical streams of the CPI left-wing, presented a draft program proposal of their own. These radicals, represented by Suniti Kumar Ghosh, criticised the draft program proposal prepared by M. Basavapunniah for undermining class struggle and failing to take a clear pro-Chinese position in the ideological conflict between the CPSU and the CCP.

The Tenali convention elected an organising committee for the Calcutta Party Congress - consisting of the 32 dissident CPI National Council members as well S.S. Srivastava (Note: S.S. Srivastava Bihar - General secretary of the Marxist Communist Party of India as of 1986) (Bihar), Bhattacharya (Assam), S.Y. Kolhatkar (Note: S.Y. Kolhatkar) (Maharashtra), Banamali Das (Note: Banamli Das) (Orissa) and 'a comrade from Karnatak'. After the Tenali convention the left CPI organised party district and state conferences in preparation for the Calcutta Party Congress.

==== Bombay and Calcutta Congresses ====
As the CPI(Left) gathered at its Party Congress in Calcutta October–November 1964 and the right CPI held its Party Congress in Bombay in December 1964 the division into two separate parties was cemented. The CPI(Left) Calcutta Party Congress took place 31 October – 7 November 1964, at Tyagraja Hall in southern Calcutta. Several key leaders of the CPI(Left) were arrested by the West Bengal state government a few days before the opening of the Party Congress.

The Calcutta Party Congress adopted a new political program. P. Sundarayya was elected general secretary of the party. In total 422 delegates took part in the Calcutta Congress. The Calcutta Party Congress declared "that all those who assembled for the convention are the real representatives of the Communist movement. The Dange group does not have any right to call itself the Communist Party of India." The Calcutta Party Congress adopted a class analysis of the character of the Indian state, that claimed the Indian bourgeoisie was increasingly collaborating with imperialism.

The CPI(Left) claimed that 14 out of 19 state units of CPI had joined the Calcutta Party Congress. No fraternal delegations were present at the Calcutta Party Congress.

The Calcutta Party Congress elected a Central Committee consisting of;

Andhra Pradesh	Kerala	Maharashtra	Madras	Punjab	West Bengal	Other states	
P. Sundarayya	E.M.S Namboodiripad	B.T. Ranadive	P. Ramamurthi	Harkishan Singh Surjeet	Muzaffar Ahmed	Achintya Bhattacharyya (Assam)	N.L. Upadhyaya (Mysore)
M. Basavapunniah	A.K. Gopalan	S.Y. Kolhatkar	M.R. Venkataraman	Jagjit Singh Lyallpuri	Jyoti Basu	S.S. Srivastava (Bihar)	Banamali Das (Orissa)
M. Hanumantha Rao	E.K. Nayanar	S.V. Parulekar (Note: S.V. Parulekar)	Balsubramanian		Promode Dasgupta	Dinkar Mehta (Gujarat)	Shankar Dayal Tewari (UP)
N. Prasad Rao	V.S. Achutanandan		N. Sankariah		Hare Krishna Konar	R.P. Saraf (J&K)	Shiv Kumar Mishra (UP)

A nine-member Politburo was formed, consisting of P. Sundarayya, Namboodiripad, P. Ramamurthi, Promode Dasgupta, M. Basavapunniah, Gopalan, Surjeet, Basu and Ranadive. A Central Control Commission was elected, consisting of Abdul Halim, Dr. Bhag Singh and C. Venkatraman.

In junction with the Calcutta Party Congress a mass rally was held at Maidan, presided by Gopalan.

At the Bombay Party Congress of the CPI(Right), the CPSU delegation was led by Boris Ponomarev. The Bombay Party Congress denounced CCP for 'chauvinistic distortion', and argued that CCP had tried to interfere in the internal affairs of CPI. Dange authored the thesis which the Bombay Party Congress adopted. The documents adopted at the Calcutta and Bombay gatherings differed on almost every major issue - the character of the Indian state, the state of revolution in the country, strategy, positions towards the Indian government, alliance building, etc. C. Rajeshwara Rao was elected general secretary of CPI(Right).

== Regional variations ==
=== Discrepancies in strength ===
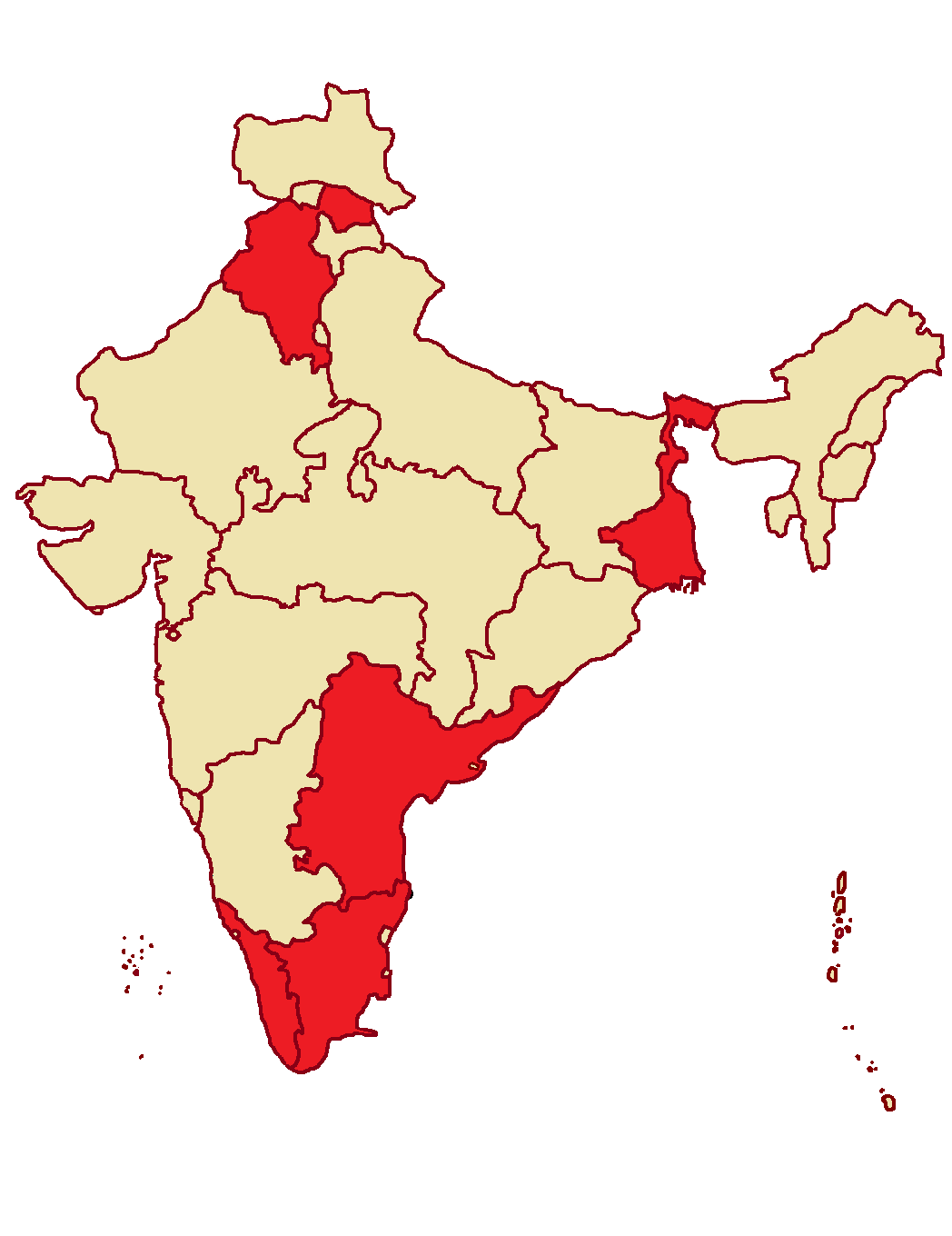
Andhra Pradesh, Kerala, Madras, Punjab and West Bengal; the five states where CPI had most of its strength concentrated as of 1964

The split in CPI had a lot of regional variations. When split finally occurred in April 1964 CPI had most of its strength concentrated in five states - Andhra Pradesh, Kerala, Madras, Punjab and West Bengal. Per Sharma (1978) the influence of the party in other states ranged between marginal and negligible. The sharp discrepancies in strength of state units fueled the rifts within the party, as differently influential state units tended to prefer different approaches to tactics and alliance-building.

In Andhra Pradesh, Kerala and West Bengal the two largest parties were the Indian National Congress and CPI. In these three states the influence of CPI was growing on the expense of the Indian National Congress, and an 'anti-Congress' line would appear the most electorally opportune choice for CPI. In Madras and Punjab, the political battle was three-sided - Indian National Congress, CPI and a regional party (Akali Dal in Punjab, Dravida Munnetra Kazhagam in Madras). CPI units were divided on whether to align with the Indian National Congress against the regional party, or align with the regional party against the Indian National Congress. Donald S. Zagoria argued that CPI (Left) saw the Indian National Congress as its main enemy, since it was their main competitor in state politics.

But in the rest of the country the role of CPI was markedly different. CPI was not in a position to defeat the Indian National Congress and claim a stake in forming a state-level government. But the political monopoly of the Indian National Congress was eroding, with right-wing parties like Bharatiya Jan Sangh, Swatantra Party or regional right-wing outfits (like Ganatantra Parishad in Orissa or the All Party Hill Leaders Conference in Assam) emerging as the challengers. Per Sharma (1978) this trend was particularly strong in Uttar Pradesh, Rajasthan, Madhya Pradesh and Gujarat. For the CPI units in these states, the position to align with the Indian National Congress against the 'extreme-right reaction' resonated well. But the proponents of this line argued that it was applicable across the country, creating tensions with the stronger state units. Per Sharma (1978) the 'anti-Congress' line was identified with the CPI left and the 'pro-Congress/anti-extreme-right reaction' line was identified with the CPI right. But there were followers of both positions in all states, meaning each state unit was affected by the power struggle and debates on tactics.

=== Agrarian demographics ===
Furthermore, Sharma (1978) argues that the sharp discrepancy in influence of CPI in different states at the time could be explained by a demographic and geographic factors. According to his analysis there appeared to exist a correlation between high population density of agrarian areas (i.e. a low man-land ratio) and significant power of CPI in state politics in states like West Bengal (average land per household 3.86 acres), Kerala (1.91, the lowest in the country) and Madras (3.87). The highest man-land ratio was found in Rajasthan (13.75), Maharashtra (12.22) and Gujarat (11.47), states where CPI was weak. Sharma does however acknowledge that the comparison of man-land ratio doesn't take differences in land distribution into account. But he argues that the failure of CPI to develop a common strategy for the party that would work well in divergent agrarian contexts "gave rise to the worst type of factionalism".

Sharma found correlation between literacy levels in the different states and strength of CPI, with Kerala having the highest adult literacy levels of the Indian states (38.9%) and Madhya Pradesh the lowest (6.7%). On the other hand, Sharma's study found no indication that caste or religious affiliation of leaders would have played any role in the split.

=== Impact of the split on the national question ===
During the pre-Independence development of CPI, a time when the party was debating on how to relate to the role of the national bourgeoisie, the struggle against British colonial rule and the Pakistan movement, it sought guidance in Marxist-Leninist canon. In 1942 Adhikari authored a resolution, which became the party line on the national question, which sought to apply Stalin's work Marxism and the National Question to Indian conditions. The 1942 CPI resolution stated that the "free India of tomorrow would be a federation or union of autonomous states of the various nationalities such as Pathans, Hindustanis, Rajasthanis, Gujeratis, Bengalis, Assamese, Beharies, Oriyas, Andhras, Tamils, Karnatiks, Maharashtrians, Meralas, etc."

But with the shifts in general political line, there were also shifts on how to relate to the national questions and language issues. According to Karat (1973) the drift towards parliamentary politics and projects of alliances with the progressive sectors of the national bourgeoisie led to a "de-emphasis on the multi-national character of the Indian State and an increasing tendency to speak of Hindi as the 'national language’, ignoring the equality of Indian languages. The eagerness to pursue the peaceful road to socialism necessitated an alliance with a section of the all-India ruling classes, i.e. a wing of the [Indian National] Congress and this understanding logically resulted in talk of India as a 'nation' and the need for a national democratic front. The concept of “national unity" and the short shrift given to the Marxist stand on nationalities was one of the differences which the Party split in 1964 highlighted."

Karat also notes that since after the 1964 split CPI tended to be stronger than CPI(M) in Hindi-speaking states or pro-Hindi states (he counted Gujarat, Maharashtra and Orissa among these states), whilst CPI(M) tended to be stronger than CPI in states with a legacy of strong anti-Hindi movements (Kerala, West Bengal, Tamil Nadu). This dynamic led CPI to be more favourable to the role of Hindi as the national language whilst CPI(M) downplayed its importance. Being more rooted in the Hindi belt in the wake of the split, the right-wing CPI sought to emphasize Hindi language to gain patriotic credentials. The CPI(M) on the other hand, whilst maintaining the notion the multinational character of India, removed support for the right to self-determination when adopting its 1964 party program.

Thakurta and Raghuraman (2007) argues that the fact that the majority of the CPI leadership in states like Uttar Pradesh and Bihar sided with CPI(Right), which would embark on a long period of decline, would lead to the erosion of left-wing influence in these states. Moreover, the CPI(ML) split a few years later disproportionately affected CPI(M) in the Hindi belt, further marginalizing CPI(M) in the Hindi-speaking region.

=== The split in the state units ===
==== Andhra Pradesh ====
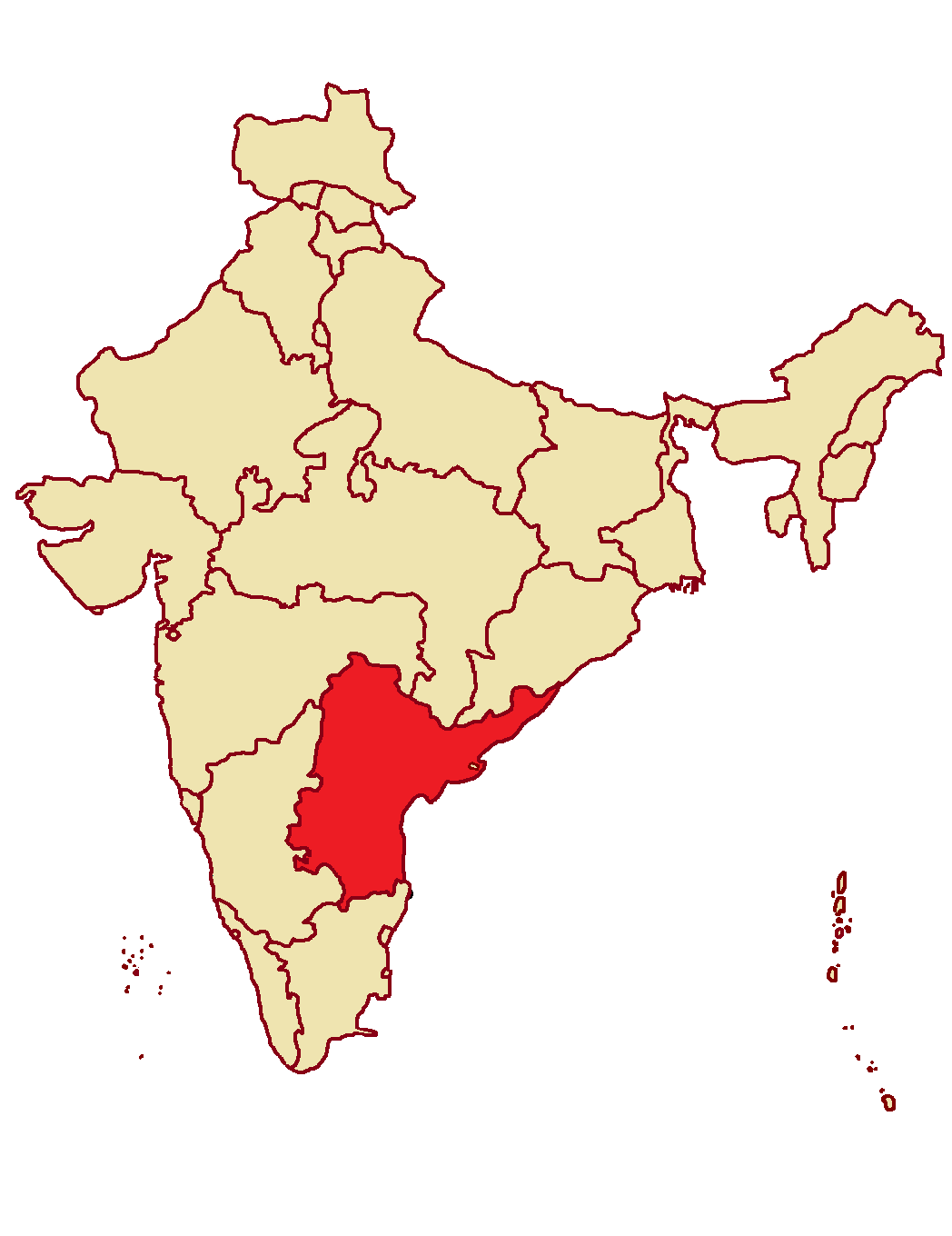
Andhra Pradesh

Out of 52 CPI members of the Andhra Pradesh Legislative Assembly, 31 sided with CPI(Right) But both the Leader of the CPI assembly group, P. Sundarayya, and the Deputy Leader, T. Nagi Reddy, sided with CPI(Left). The Leader of the CPI group in the Andhra Pradesh Legislative Council, Makhdoom Mohiuddin, sided with the CPI(Right). Other key personalities that sided with CPI(Right) in the state included C. Rajeshwara Rao, Ravi Narayana Reddy and N. Rajashekhara Reddy. P. Venkateswarlu would become the Leader of the CPI(Right) group in the Legislative Assembly. The CPI(R) held its state conference in Guntur 18–23 November, which re-elected N. Rajasekhara Reddy as state secretary.

In Karimnagar District most leaders and cadres sided with CPI(Right), except Yella Reddy. However, Yella Reddy switched from CPI(Left) to CPI(Right) only three months after the split.

CPI(M) would suffer a major split in June 1968, when the majority of its members in Andhra Pradesh sided with the Andhra Pradesh Coordination Committee of Communist Revolutionaries (APCCCR) led by T. Nagi Reddy, D.V. Rao, Chandra Pulla Reddy and Kolla Venkaiah.

==== Assam ====
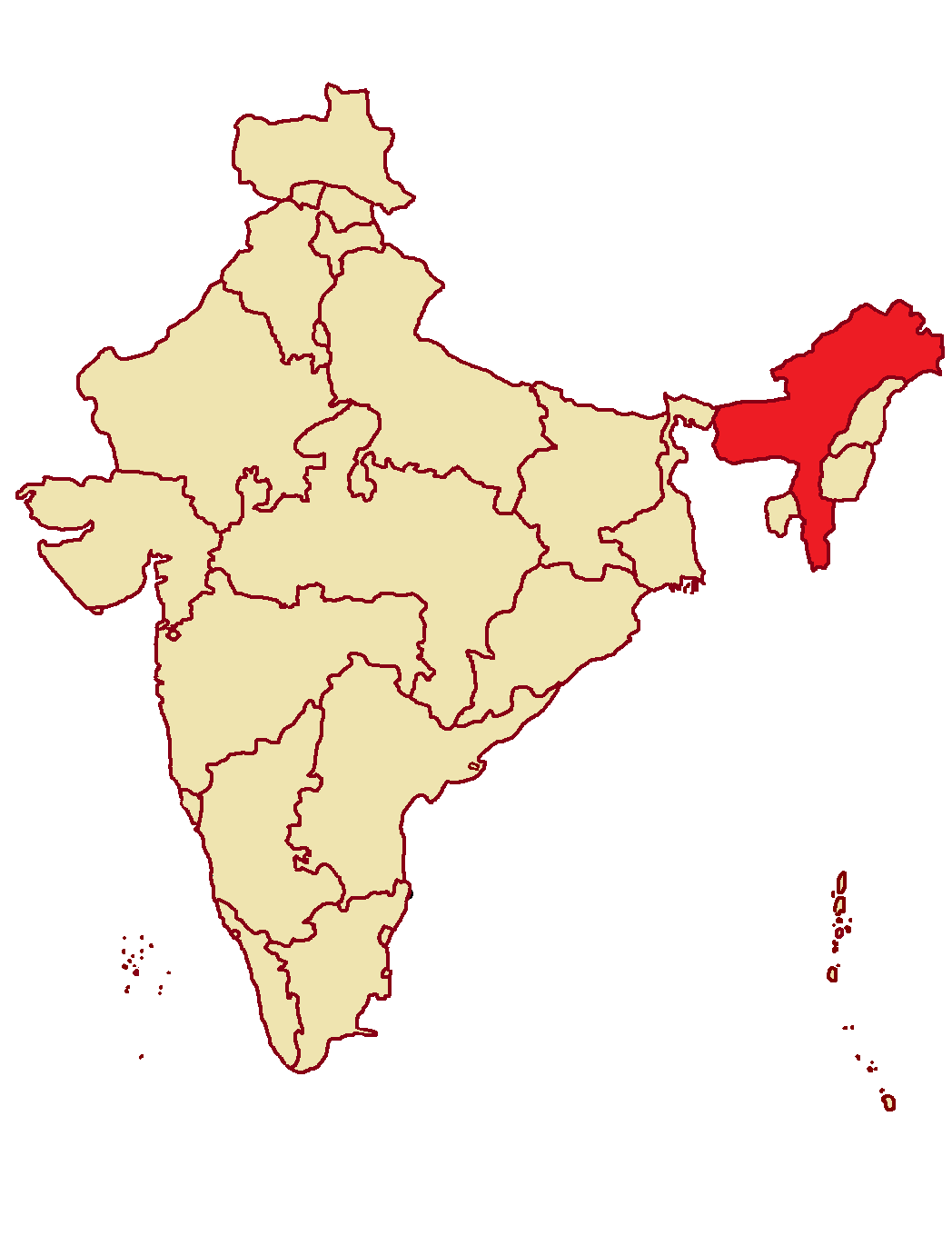
Assam

The CPI Assam State Council met in June 1964 at Krishnai, Goalpara. At the meeting disciplinary action were taken against four State Council members; Bhattacharya, Suren Hazarika, Nandeswar Talukdar and Biresh Misra. The four dissidents proceeded to form a State Committee of the CPI(Left), along with some other individuals. Bhattacharya became the State Committee Secretary.

==== Bihar ====
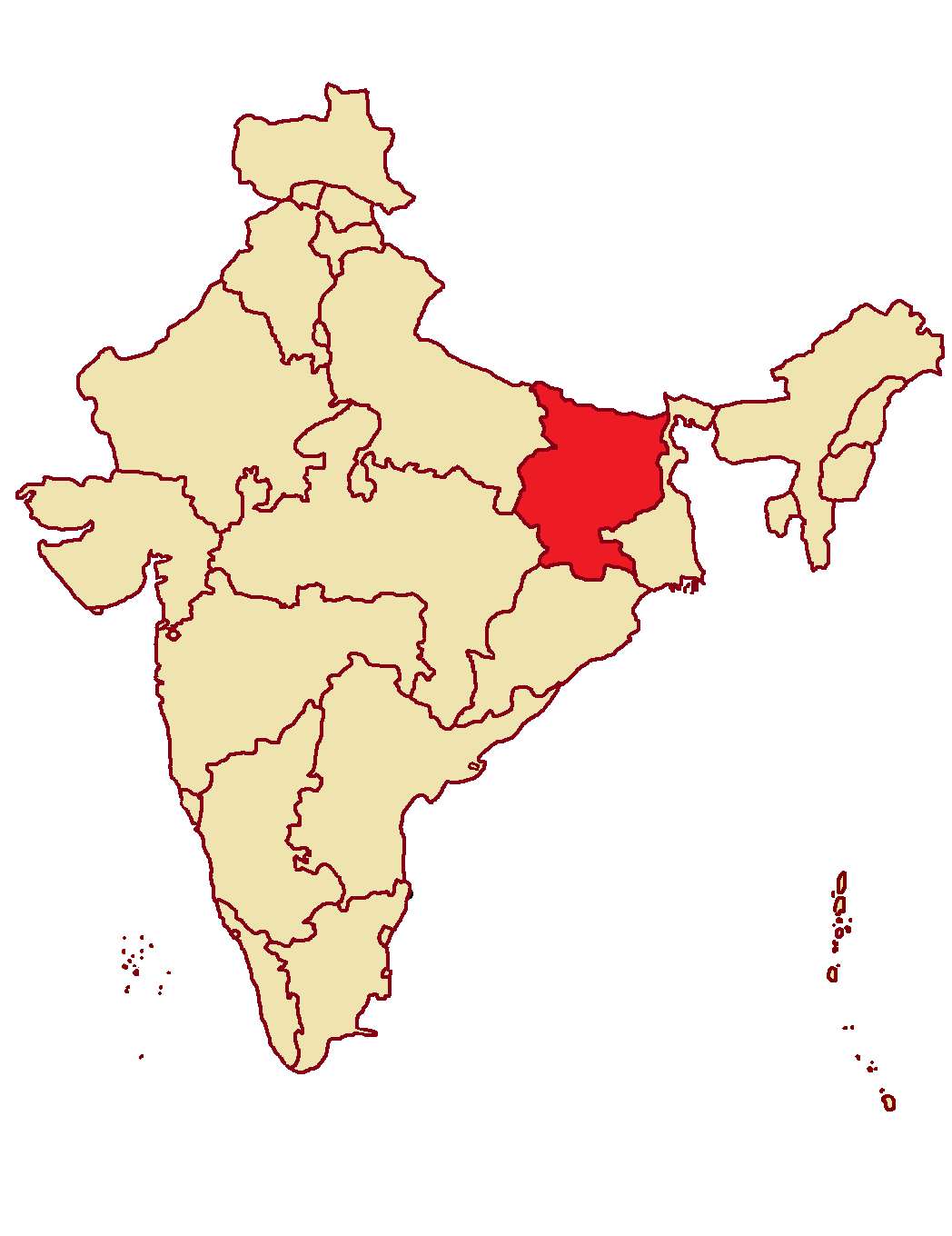
Bihar

In Bihar, most of the party organization and leadership sided with the CPI(Right). Only one CPI State Executive member sided with the CPI(Left). Some 19% of the CPI members went to the CPI(Left). Between 1964 and 1972, CPI(M) membership in Bihar declined from 2,698 to 2,386.

==== Gujarat ====
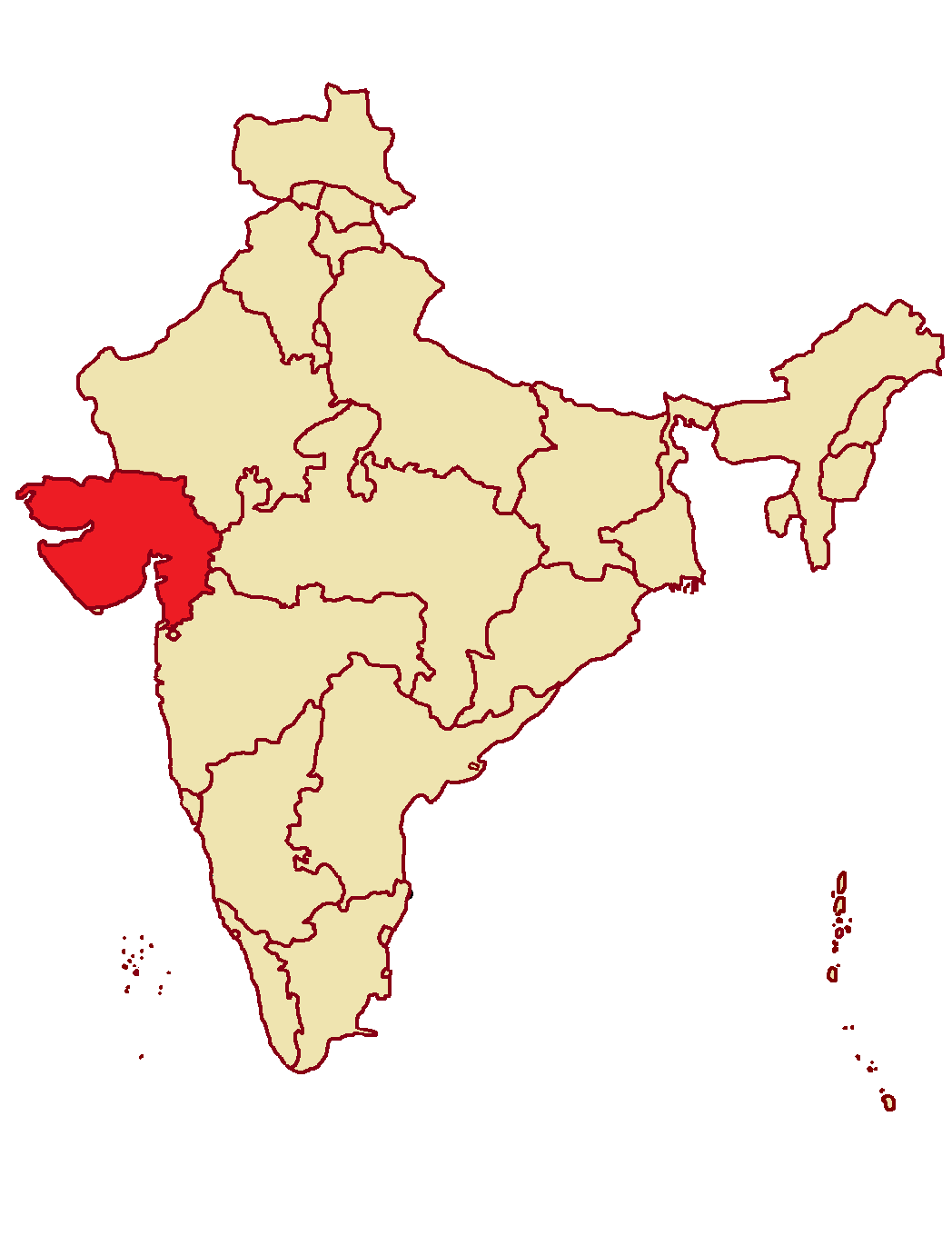
Gujarat

Per Limaye (1991) '[t]he Communist Movement was never strong in Gujarat, and the split of 1964 further weakened it.' In the lead-up to the split, the Gujarat State Council and Gujarat State Secretariat of CPI had not confronted Dange directly, but a majority within the bodies espoused criticisms on Dange's leadership and political line. The Dange group was worried about the dominance of Dinkar Mehta and Chiman Mehta in the Gujarat party unit. Dinkar Mehta, CPI Gujarat State Council Secretary and National Council member, had not joined the walk-out at the April 1964 but was identified as a leftist. Mehta's group managed to win the allegiance of Vajubhai Shukla, a founder of the party in Gujarat, who agreed to join the preparatory committee for the left CPI Calcutta Party Congress. Dinkar Mehta attended the Tenali convention, and afterwards organized a special convention in Ahmedabad to present a report from Tenali. For the Dange group this was an act of open defiance of party discipline, and they instructed their loyalists in Gujarat to organize a new State Council.

The opportunity arrived in August 1964, as on 5 August 1964 the Mahagujarat Janata Parishad of Indulal Yagnik organized a state-wide hartal (general strike). Dinkar Mehta took part in mobilizing mill workers to join the strike. After the hartal and strike, Mehta and party leaders were arrested. In their absence the Dange loyalists constituted themselves as the new Gujarat State Secretariat of the party. The Dange-led party headquarters immediately recognized the new State Secretariat.

==== Himachal Pradesh ====
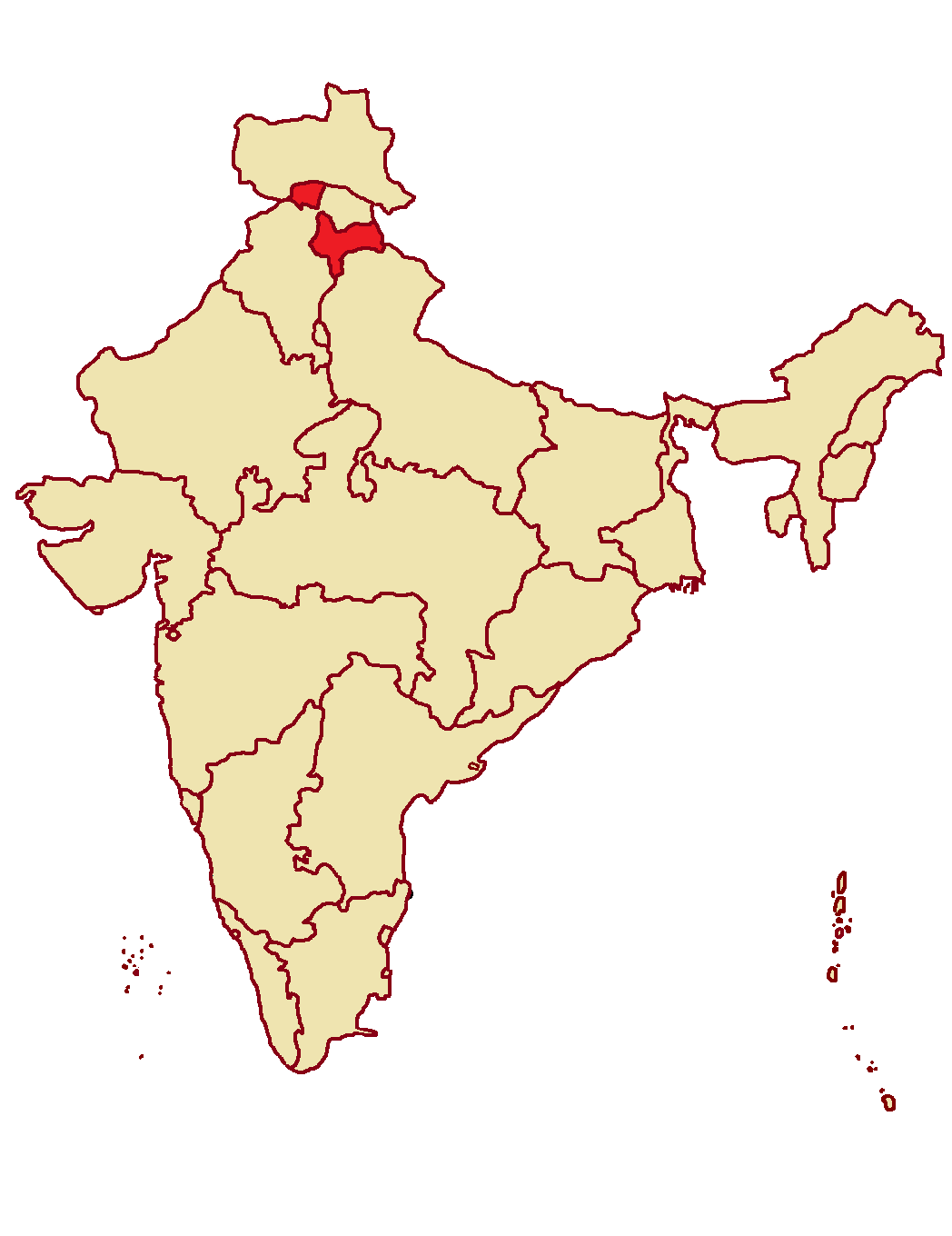
Himachal Pradesh

CPI established a party organization in Himachal Pradesh in 1953, as a district unit of the Punjab state unit of the party. The party was a minor force in Himachal politics, limited to a few pockets of influence among middle and small land owners, landless agricultural workers, apple-growers, employees and workers. Whilst not having a separate state party unit, CPI managed to articulate demands for retaining statehood for Himachal Pradesh and expanding the state territory.

In April 1961 a proper CPI state unit was formed in the state. The 1964 split affected the small party organization adversely, but as CPI supported the Punjab Reorganisation Act, 1966 it managed to recover politically, increasing its number of Legislative Assembly seats from one in 1962 to two in 1967. The eleven candidates of CPI in the 1967 Himachal Pradesh Legislative Assembly election obtained 22,173 votes (2.89% of the total votes in the state, 16.76% in the constituencies contested). Most of the party organization in Himachal Pradesh had sided with the CPI right in the 1964 split. The founding leader of CPI in Himachal Pradesh, Kameshwar Pandit, remained in CPI, and led the party in the state as the Himachal Pradesh State Council Secretary until his death in 2001. CPI would for the most part support the Indian National Congress state governments in the years following the split.

The left CPI had also supported statehood for Himachal Pradesh. The sole CPI legislator in the state, Tarachand (Note: Tarachand - Member of Himachal Pradesh Legislative Assembly 1962-1967, elected secretary of the Himachal Pradesh State Committee in 1978, later president of Himachal Pradesh Kisan Sabha, died in the late 1990s.), had sided with the CPI(Left) in the 1964 split (in 1962 elections to a 41-member Territorial Council had been held, which was converted through legislation into a Legislative Assembly on 1 July 1963). CPI(M) failed to retain its presence in the legislature in the 1967 assembly election, its six candidates obtained 3,019 votes (0.39% of the total votes in the state, 4.08% in the six constituencies contested). CPI(M) would remain very marginal force in state politics after the split, its role in Himachal politics would only take off years later with the establishment of Students Federation of India unit at the Himachal Pradesh University.

==== Jammu-Kashmir ====
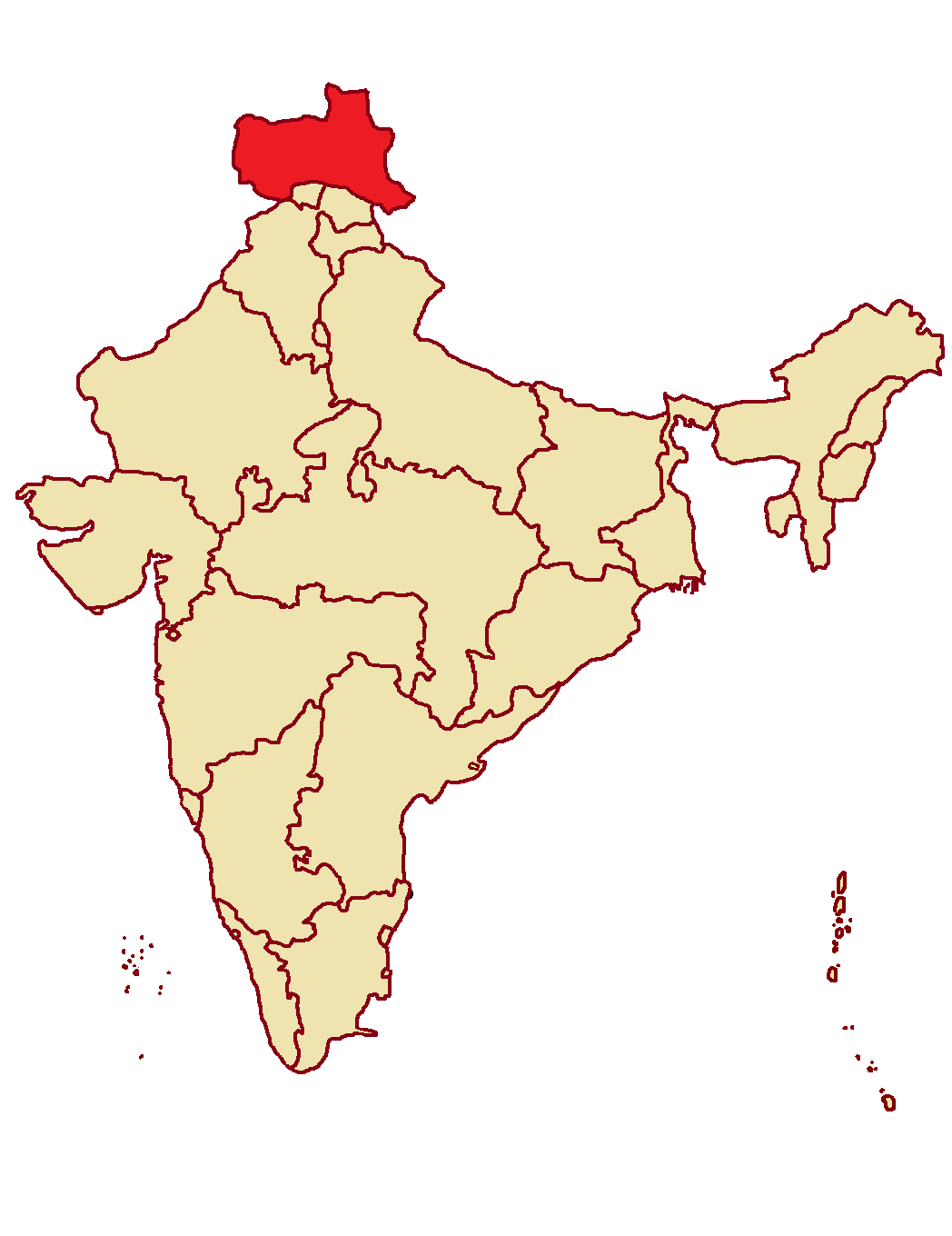
Jammu-Kashmir

In Jammu-Kashmir, the Democratic National Conference had emerged in 1957, as the progressive wing of the National Conference broke away. In 1960 the majority of the Democratic National Conference re-united with the National Conference, but a small group led by Saraf retained their own party under the name Democratic Conference. Saraf's Democratic Conference aligned with CPI, and Saraf was inducted into the CPI National Council. Krishen Dev Sethi was the Jammu Province Secretary of the Democratic Conference, Ghulam Mohammed Malik its Kashmir Province Secretary. In mid-1960 the Democratic Conference held a meeting in Samba which elected a State Committee of the party. The party contested the 1962 Indian general election in Jammu Province but boycotted the election in Kashmir Province. During 1963-1964 the party almost entirely dedicated its efforts to try to mobilise the peasantry. By the latter half of 1964, the Democratic Conference sided with the CPI (Left) and became its referent in Jammu-Kashmir. Saraf became a CPI(Left) Central Committee member. The state government responded to the pledge of allegiance of the Democratic Conference to the supposedly 'pro-China' CPI(Left) by arresting Saraf, Sethi, Malik and the Kisan Sabha leader Abdul Kabir Wani. The four leaders remained in jail until June 1966.

The Dange-led CPI sent Z.A. Ahmed to visit Jammu-Kashmir on multiple occasions, to organize a split in the Democratic Conference and set up a unit of the right CPI there. Many Democratic Conference members, especially in Kashmir Province, broke away and joined the right CPI. Once released from prison, the (CPI(M)-aligned) Democratic Conference leaders reorganized their party. A state conference, at which Surjeet participated, was held in Jammu mid-1966. The Jammu meeting decided to set up District Committees across the state, abolishing the position of Provincial Secretaries. The meeting elected Saraf as general secretary of the party and Malik, Sethi, Wani, Nahar Singh and Ved Paul Deep as the remaining members of its State Central Committee.

After a disappointing experience in the 1967 Indian general election (in which the Democratic Conference contested one seat in Jammu Province) and the Jammu and Kashmir Legislative Assembly election (in which the Democratic Conference contested five seats in Kashmir Province), the party would move towards more radical positions. Saraf was excluded from the CPI(M) Central Committee for voicing support to the Naxalbari uprising. In 1968 the Democratic Conference broke its links with CPI(M), and would align with the Communist Party of India (Marxist-Leninist) the following year. CPI(M) would regain presence in Jammu-Kashmir politics in May 1971, as the Nukta Nazar faction led by Sethi disowned the CPI(ML) and returned to the CPI(M) fold. Again Surjeet was acting as the link between the CPI(M) centre and its followers in the state.

==== Kerala ====
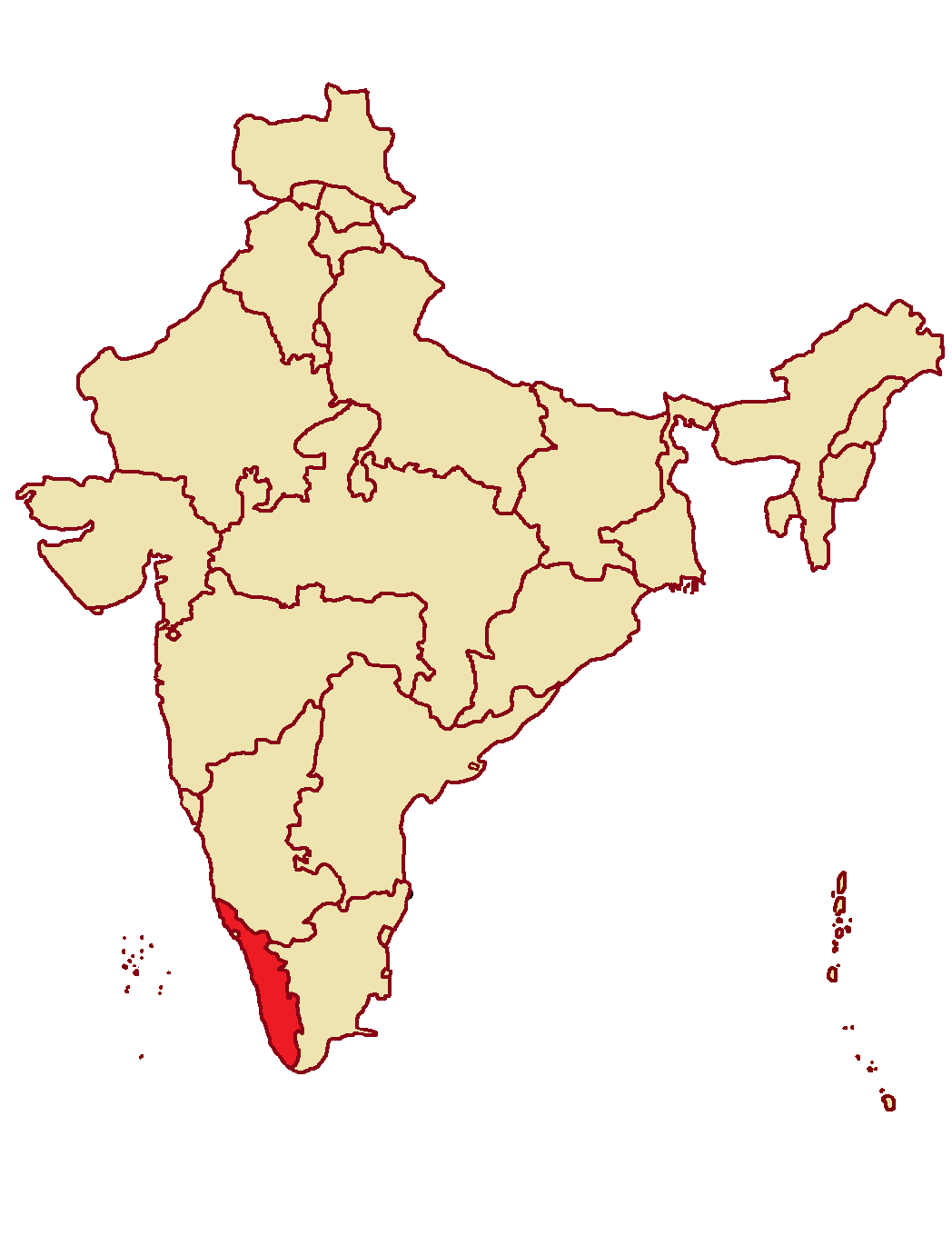
Kerala

In Kerala most of the top leadership in CPI, such as M.N. Govindan Nair, T.V.Thomas, R. Sugathan and C. Achutha Menon stayed with CPI. The rightists had a 2/3 majority in both the CPI Kerala State Council and the CPI legislative faction (19 out of 30 assembly members sided with CPI(Right), including the Deputy Leader of the CPI group in the Kerala Legislative Assembly C. Achutha Menon). Among the leaders that went with CPI(M), the most prominent were Namboodiripad (CPI group leader in the assembly), Gopalan and K.R. Gowri Amma. But whilst most of the top leaders in the state sided with CPI, most of the party cadres sided with CPI(M). In the case of T.V. Thomas and K.R. Gowri Amma, the party split placed the two spouses in opposing factions.

Immediately after the April 1962 meeting, the CPI National Council sent C. Achutha Menon and M.K. Kumaran back to Kerala to mobilize support for the rightist party leadership. But Namboodiripad and Gopalan had already built up a strong network among the rank and file. Whilst the rightists retained dominance over the Kerala unit of the All India Trade Union Congress in the midst of the split, the leftists controlled the Kerala Karshaka Sangham (the state unit of the All India Kisan Sabha) and agricultural workers' movements - organizations that influenced most CPI District Committees in the state.

In Malabar the CPI cadres sided with Gopalan and Namboodiripad en bloc. The leftists also claimed control over the Trivandrum and Allepey District Committees of the party. The rightists had control over the Quilon District Committee. The Trichur and Ernakulam District Committees had not clearly sided with either wing, but the Trichur District Committee reportedly leaned towards the rightists, whilst the Ernakulam District Committee reportedly leaned towards the leftists.

==== Madras State ====
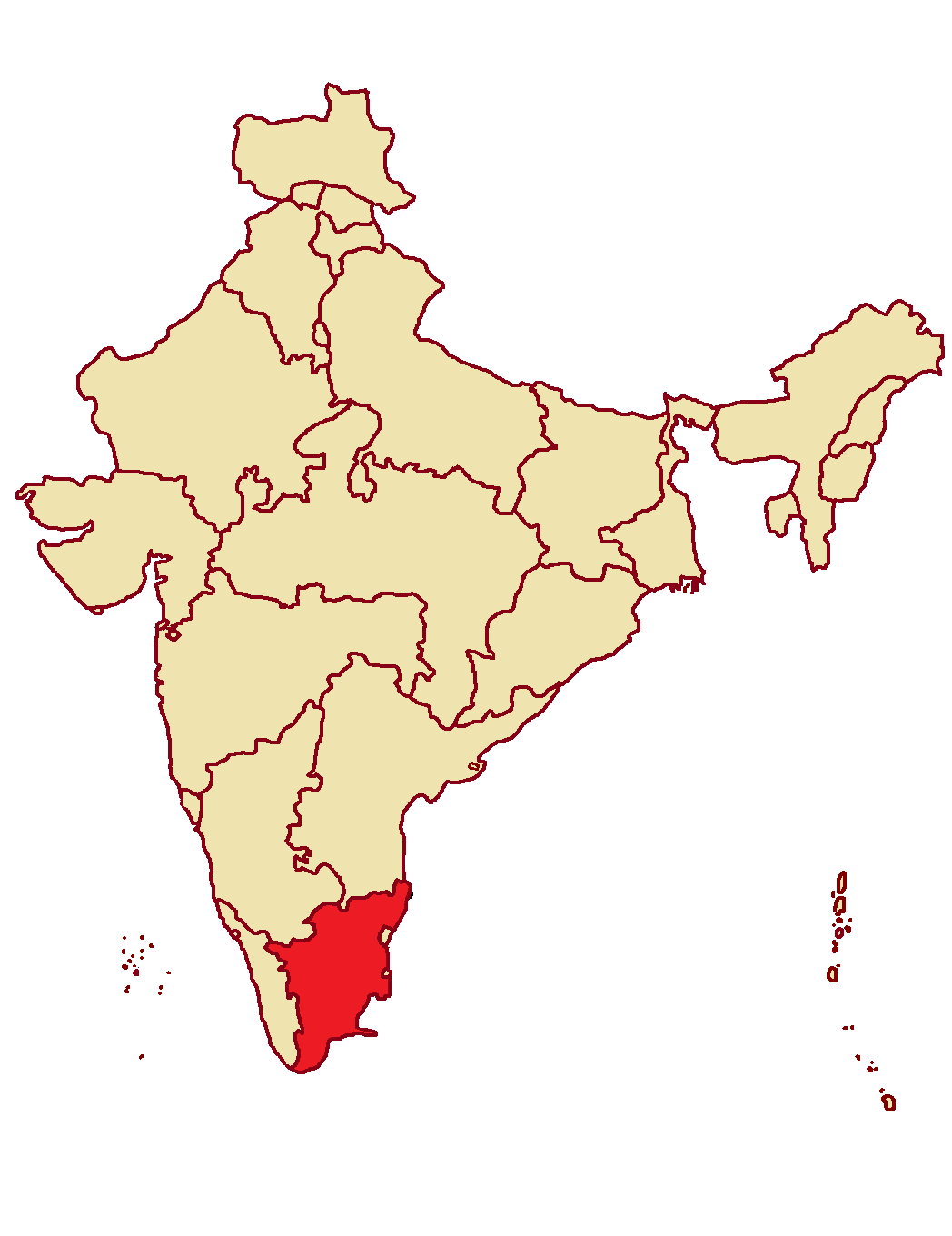
Madras State

The communists of Madras State had maintained a diplomatic role in the party all through 1951 to 1964. Generally the Tamil communists had been strong supporters of Ghosh's centrist bloc. The leftist trend in the state led by P. Ramamurthi (also known as the 'Madurai group') emerged only after 1961 Vijayawada Party Congress, previously P. Ramamurthi had been more of a centrist over even rightist in the ideological disputes within the party. The Madras State leftists in CPI National Council were P. Ramamurthi, M.R. Venkataraman, K. Ramani and N. Sankaraiah.

On 12 April 1964, i.e. the day after the walk-out at the National Council meeting, the leftist grouping in the CPI Madurai District Council (representing 43 members out of 80 members of the Madurai District Council) held a meeting in Thiruparankundram. The Thiruparankundram meeting denounced the en bloc expulsion of the 32 dissident National Council members. A 2-day meeting was convened in Madurai by M.R. Venkataram, gathering forces of the leftist trend of CPI in state. The attendees of this convention established themselves as the state-level unit of the left CPI (i.e. the party later re-baptised as CPI(M)). On the other end of the spectrum, the rightist held a meeting in Coimbatore April 27–29, 1964 to reorganise their party state-level unit. Manali C. Kandaswami (Note: Manali C. Kandaswami) and N.C. Krishanan emerged as leaders of the CPI(Right) in the state.

As the Tillers Association and Agricultural Labourers Union became controlled by the CPI(Right), the CPI(Left) founded the Tamil Nadu Tillers Association as a mass organization of its own.

==== Maharashtra ====
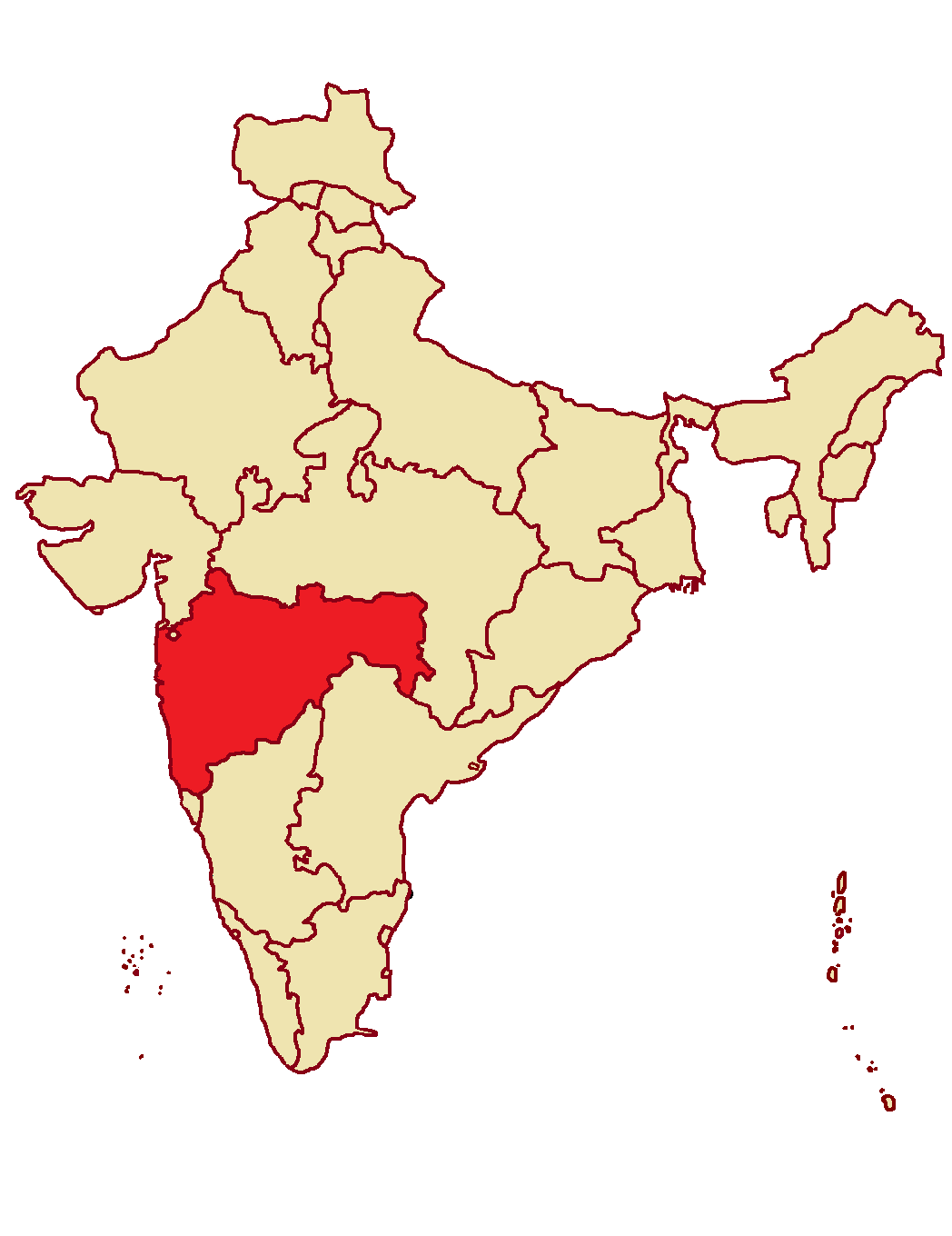
Maharashtra

Most of the CPI Maharashtra unit sided with CPI(Right). But the CPI Thane District unit largely sided with CPI(Left). In the Thane District the party had been led by Shamrao and Godavari Parulekar, and the Kisan Sabha had organized the Warli people there since the pre-Independence period. The 1964 CPI(Left) Maharashtra state conference, held in Talasari, elected S.Y. Kolhatkar as the State Committee Secretary and the Parulekars as members of the State Secetariat.

==== Manipur ====
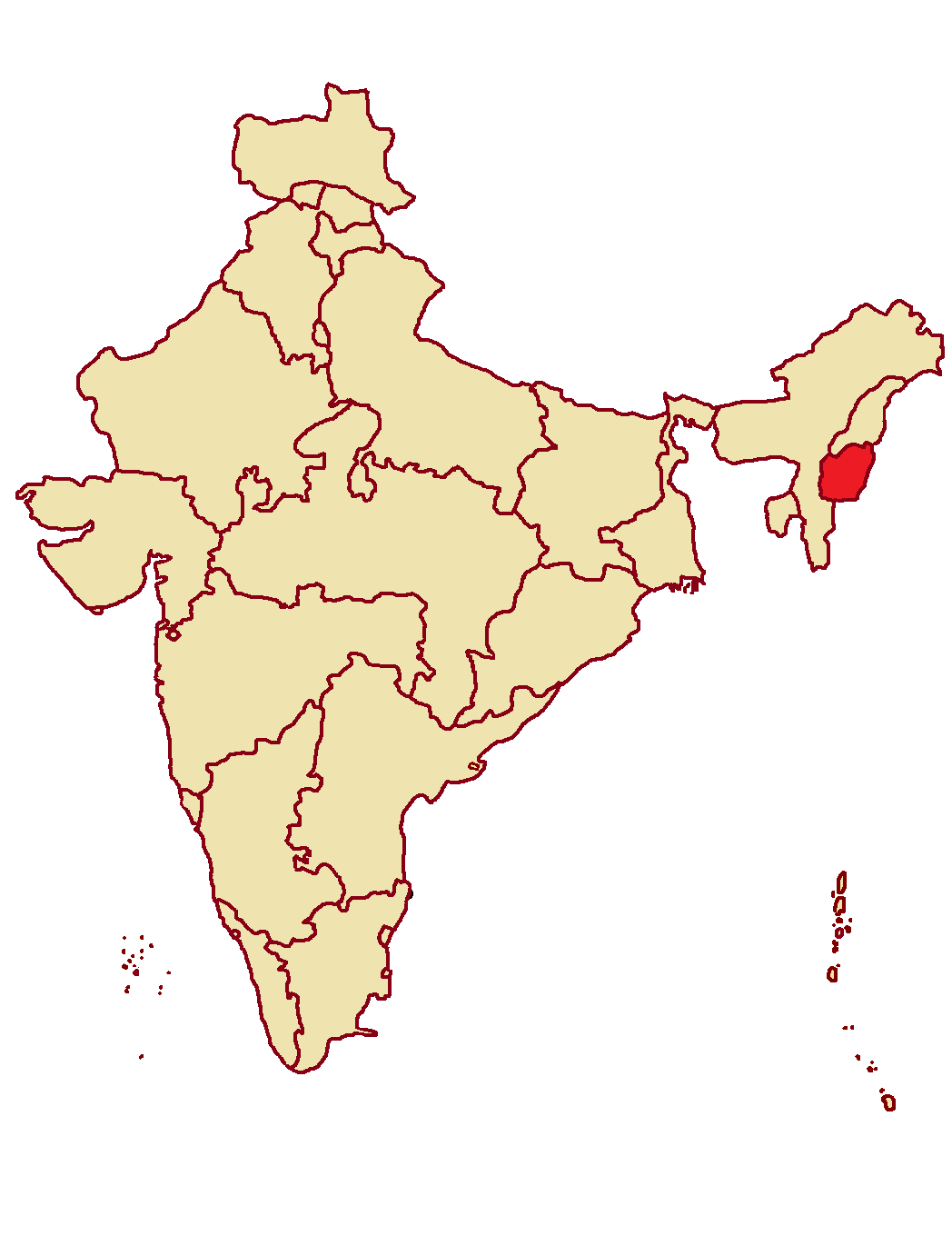
Manipur

The bulk of party cadres in Manipur sided with the CPI(Right) in the 1964 split. The CPI(M) leader Chattradhari had stayed with the rightists in 1964, and was expelled from CPI much later. After the split the CPI(Right) and CPI(M) state units adopted different interpretations of the role of Hijam Irabot - the CPI Manipur unit maintained that Irabot had favoured integration of a free, socialist Manipur in a free, socialist India, whilst the CPI(M) Manipur state unit would argue that Irabot had favoured complete independence from India.

==== Mysore ====
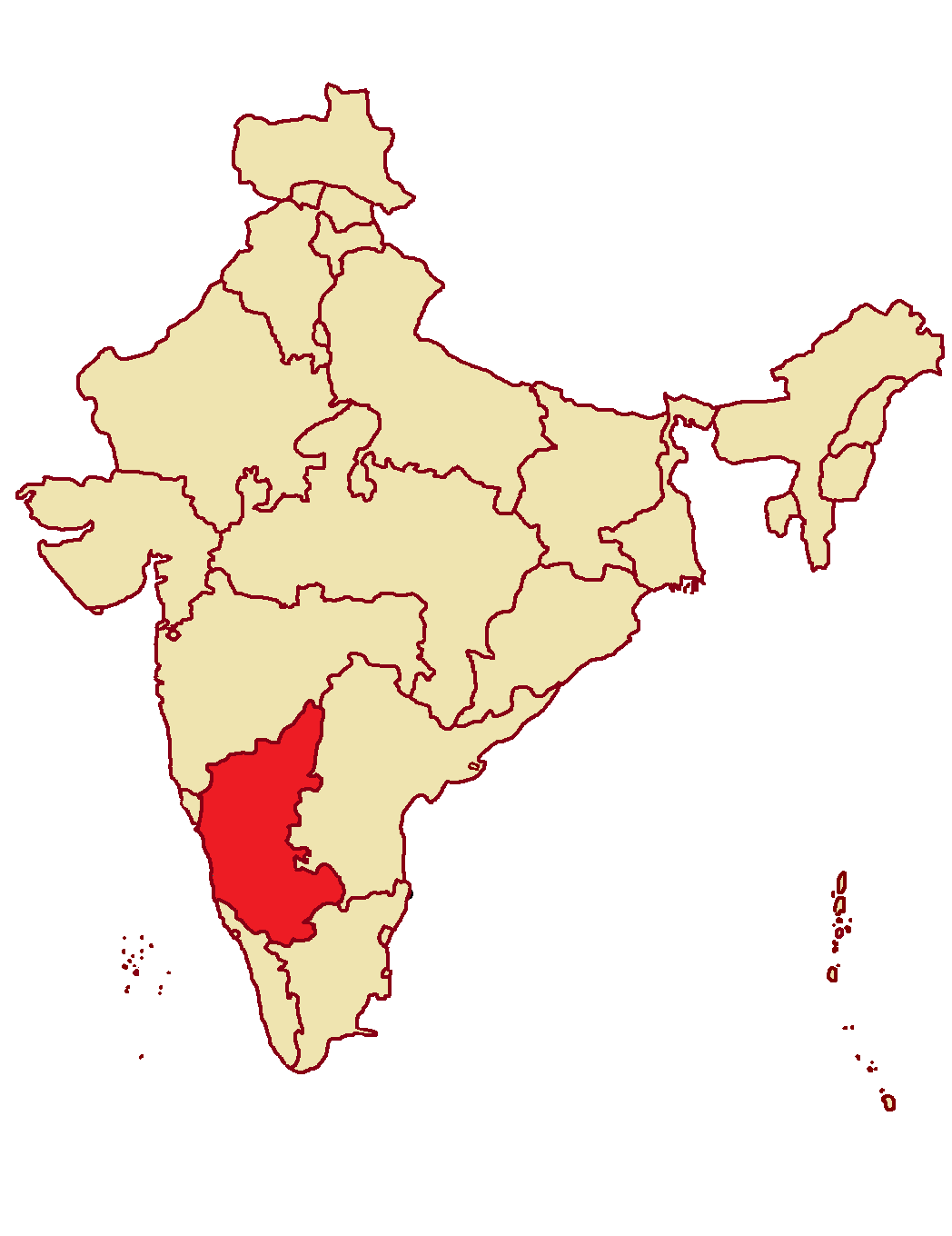
Mysore

During the 1964 split the party was divided evenly between the two parties, but much of top leadership in Mysore State sided with CPI(Left). In Mangalore and Kolar Gold Fields some key trade union leaders joined CPI (Left). CPI(Right) built up its state unit from scratch during years following the split, whereas the CPI(M) state unit was plagued with factionalism and went into a period of decline.

==== Orissa ====
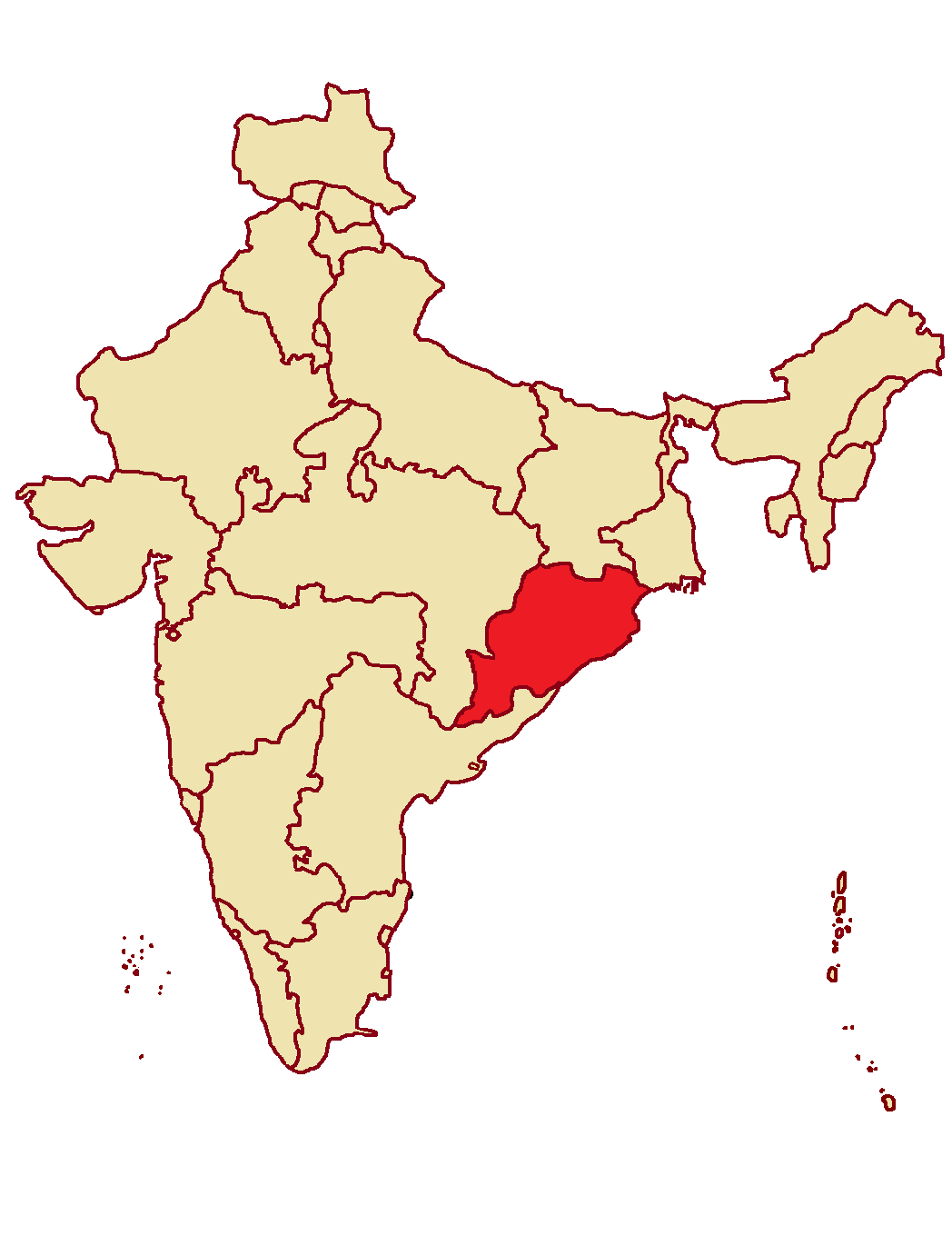
Orissa

Founders of the CPI(Left) in Orissa included Banamali Das, Shivaji Patnaik (Note: Shivaji Patnaik), D.B.M. Patnaik (Note: D.B.M. Patnaik) and Nagbhushan Patnaik (Note: Nagbhushan Patnaik).

==== Punjab ====
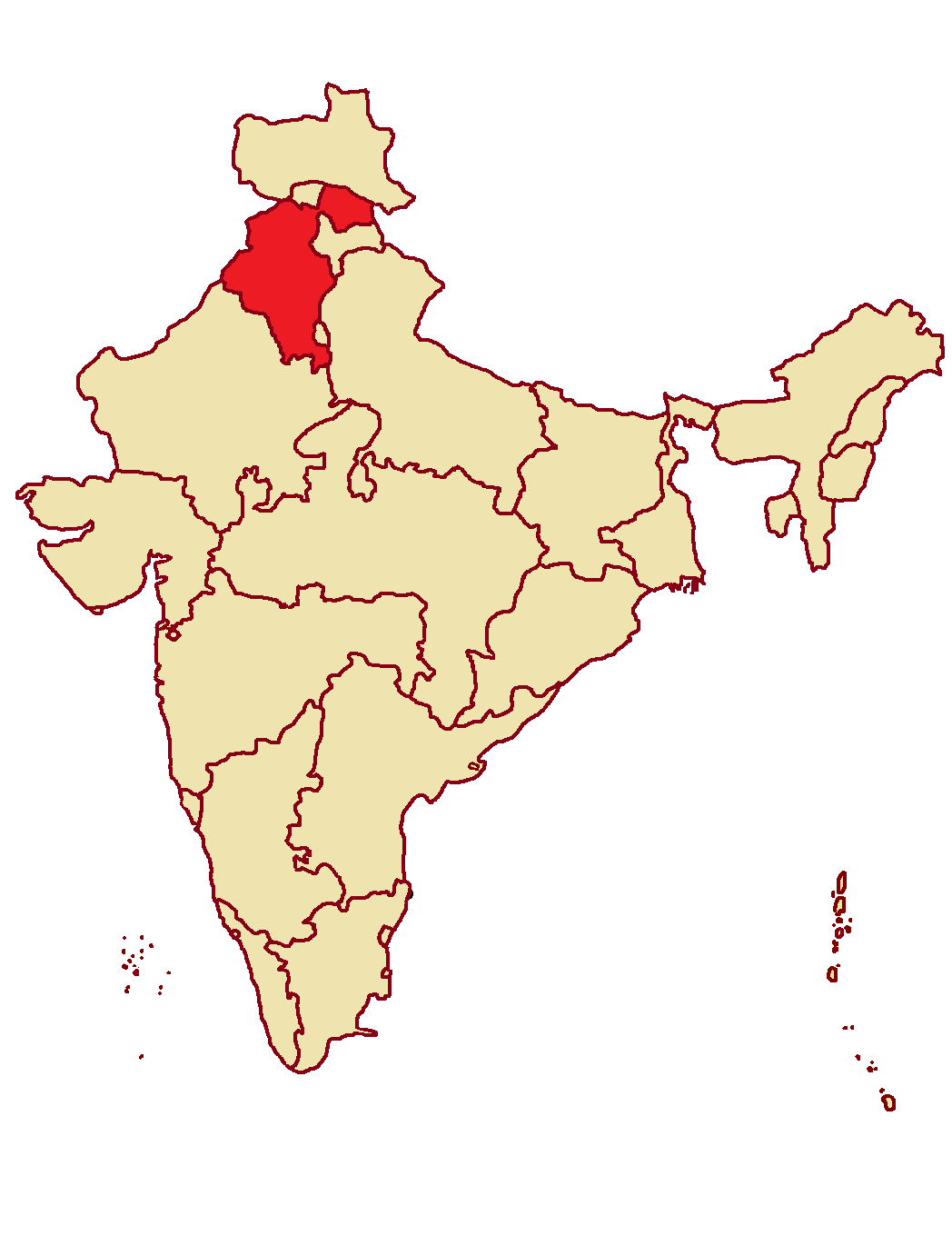
Punjab

Prior to 1964, the Punjab unit of CPI was heavily factionalized. In the split the faction of 'Red Communists', i.e. former members of the Lal Communist Party in districts like Bhatinda, Sangrur, Ferozepur and Patiala, stayed in CPI. Notably the 'Red Communists' were strongly opposed to the leadership of Surjeet.

Josh emerged as the key leader of CPI(Right). Following the split, CPI(Right) was significantly larger than the CPI(Left) in Punjab, as the latter lacked a strong mass base and lacked support among workers, landless peasants and agricultural labourers. In Punjab most of the industrial workers and agricultural labourers sided with CPI in the split, whilst a middle-peasant element sided with CPI(M). CPI(Left) had pockets of support in Mohindergarh and Karnal. Nevertheless, both parties remained overwhelmingly based among the peasantry.

==== Rajasthan ====
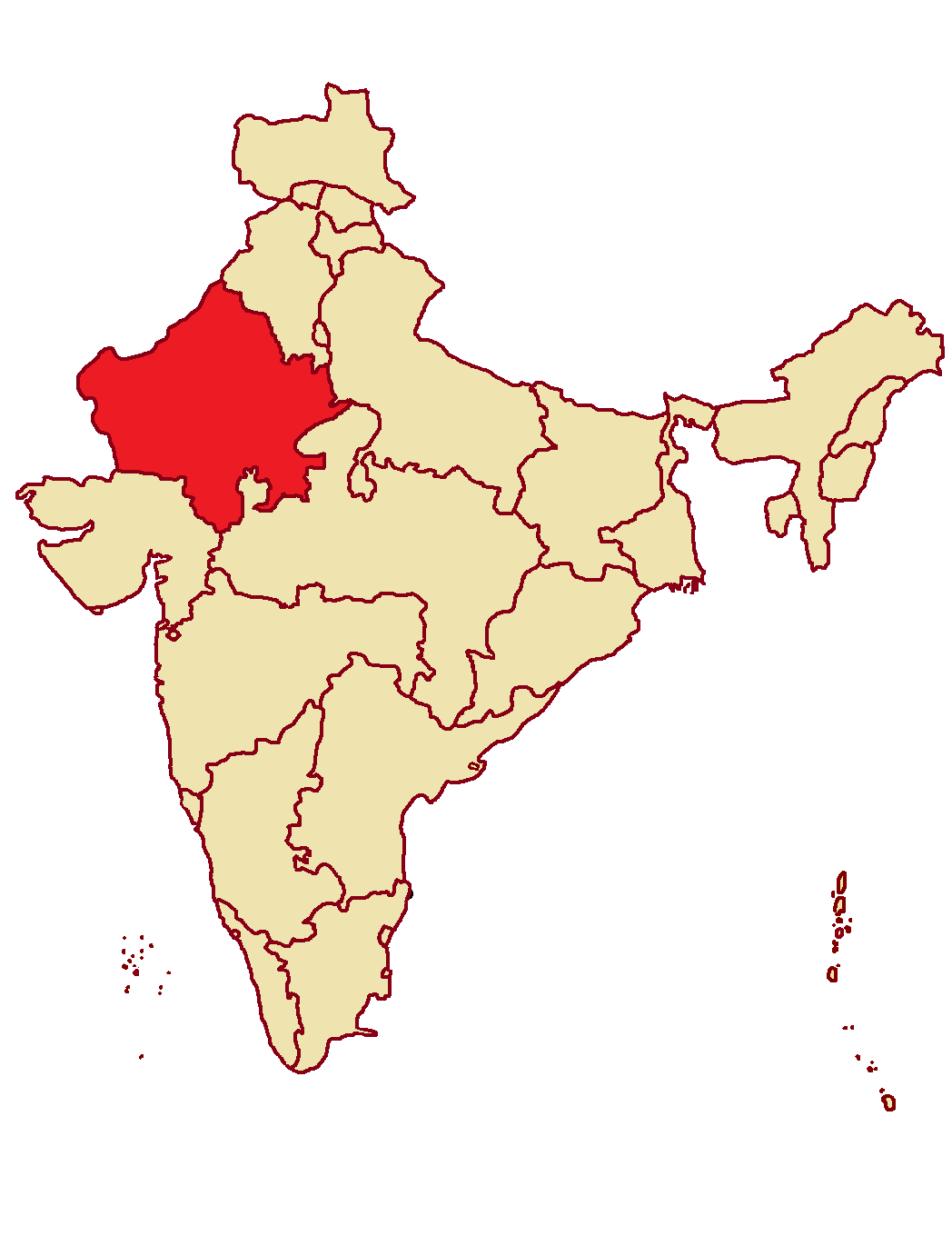
Rajasthan

Around May 1964 a state unit of CPI(Left) was organised by Punamia.

==== Tripura ====
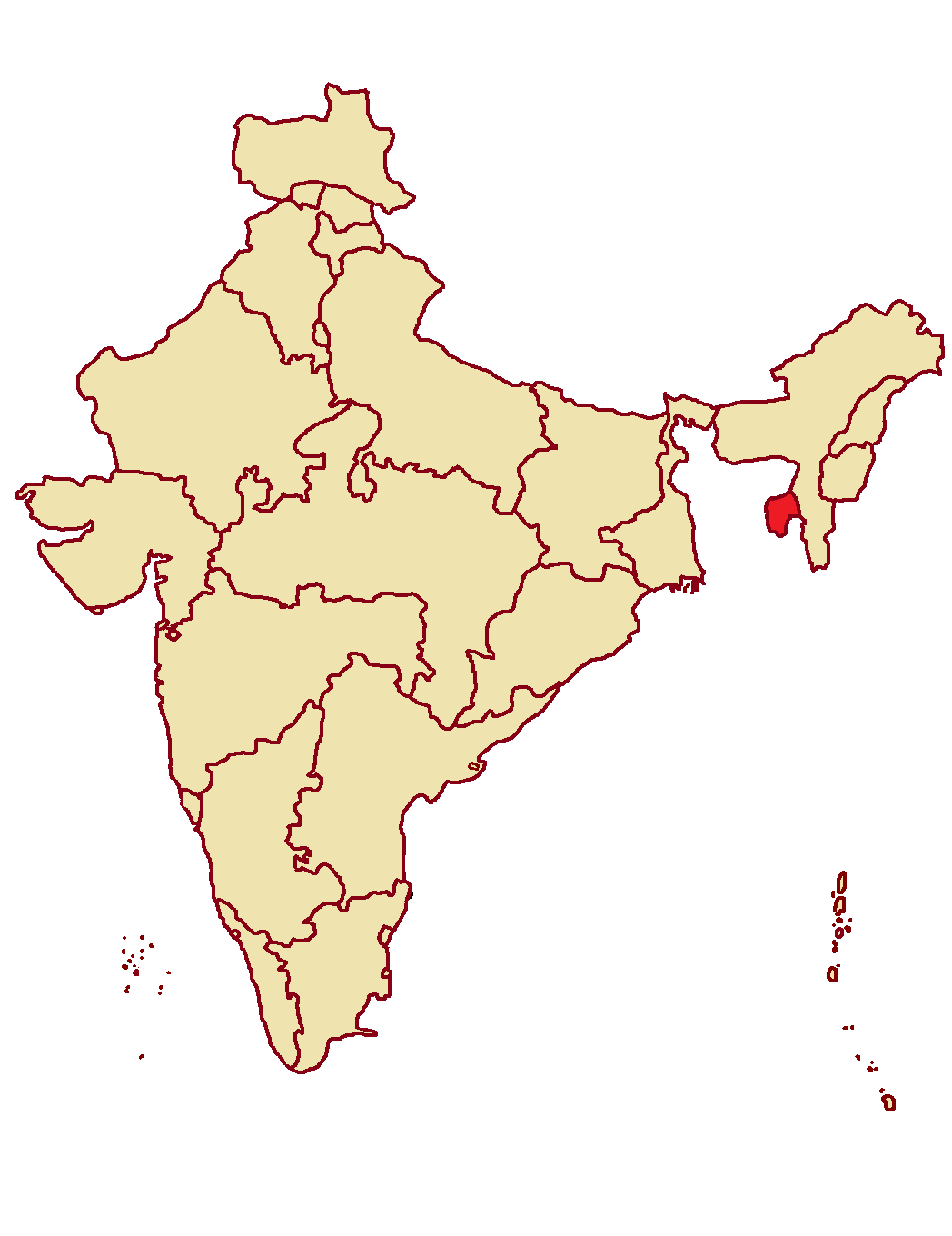
Tripura

The split played out differently in Tripura than in the rest of India. By late 1962 almost the entire state-level party leadership had been jailed. When the split in CPI occurred in 1964, practically the entire CPI Tripura State Council was lodged at the Hazaribagh Central Jail in Bihar. Party cadres in rural areas were generally unaware of the split in the rest of the country. When CPI leaders from Tripura were released from jail in mid-1964 they encountered that the national party had been divided. In the face of the split, the Tripura unit of the party resolved to remain united and neutral until a state level party convention could be held to discuss the future of the party.

Whilst Tripura party leaders had agreed on neutrality, it was understood that Aghore Devbarma, Atikul Islam and Jhunu Das were close to the right CPI and Biren Dutta, Dasarath Deb, Bhanu Ghosh, Saroj Chanda, Kanu Sen, Benu Sen, Samar Chakraborty, Makhan Dutta and Debabrata Chakraborty were close to the left CPI. Nripen Chakraborty (Note: Nripen Chakraborty) had reportedly stated that he was "internationally pro-Moscow and nationally anti-Dange".

As agreed a convention of Tripura unit of the party was held in Kalyanpur (Khowai) in the last week of March 1965. At the onset of the convention there was a ruckus, as the leftists delegates protested against the delegate mandates of Benoy Debbbarma and Punjab Debbarma. Both Benoy and Punjab Debbarma would have had the right to delegate credential as they had been delegates to the last state conference, but the two had violated the agreement in the party unit by openly endorsing the Dange-led CPI in the run-up to the convention. In protest against the ruckus caused by the leftists, 13 delegates led by Aghore Debbarma and Jitendra Lal Das walked out of the convention in protest. Thus the party was finalized in Tripura; The group of the 13 delegates that walked out of the Kalyanpur convention would constitute the CPI state unit and the delegates that remained at the Kalyanpur convention would constitute the CPI(M) state unit.

Most of the Tripura cadres joined CPI(M), as they followed Dasrath Deb, Biren Dutta and Nripen Chakraborty in the split. Notably, the main base of the party was tribal and Deb was the foremost leader of their community.

==== Uttar Pradesh ====
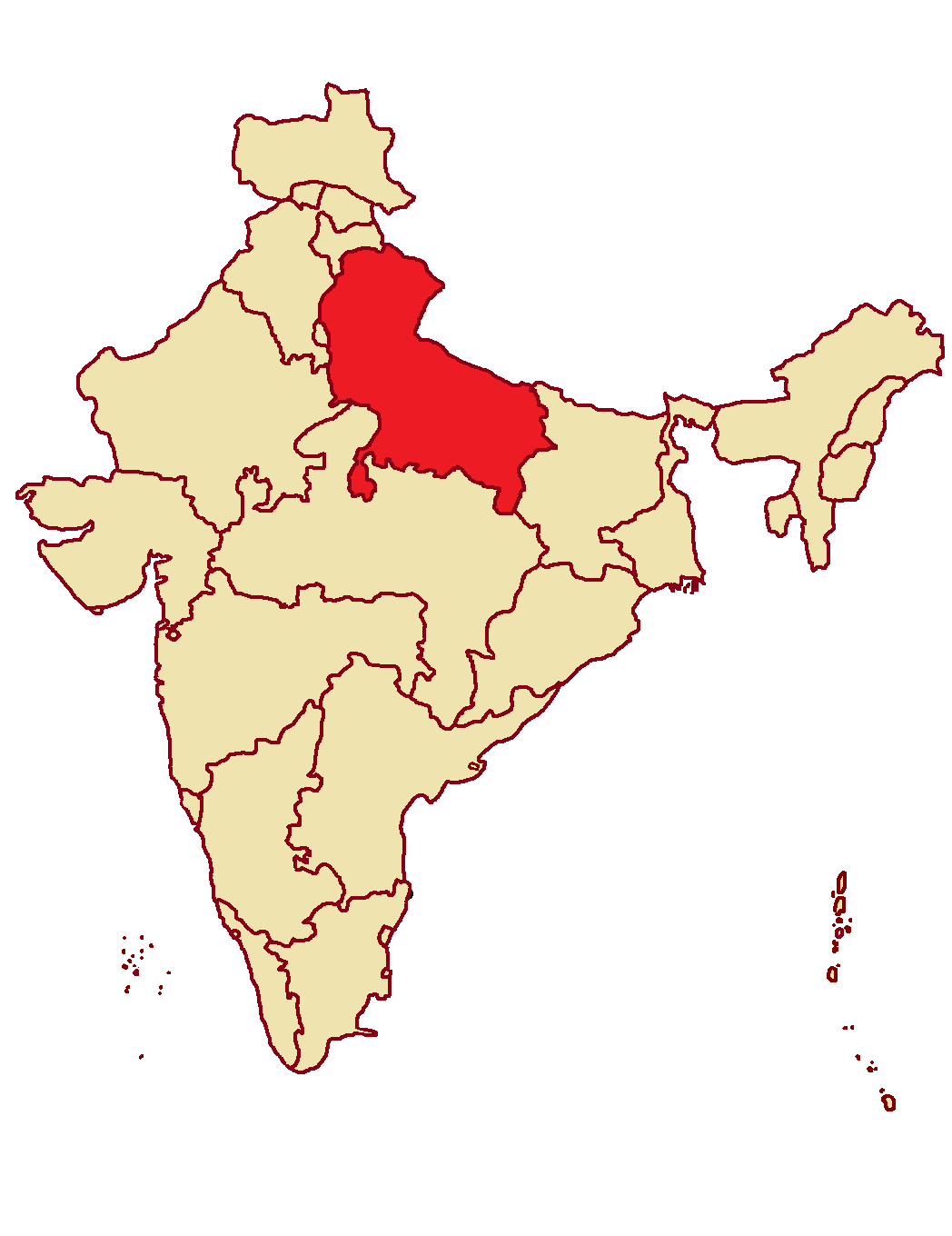
Uttar Pradesh

During the split Kali Shanker Shukla sided with the CPI(Right) whilst Shanker Dayal Tewari emerged as the leader of CPI(Left) in the state.

==== West Bengal ====
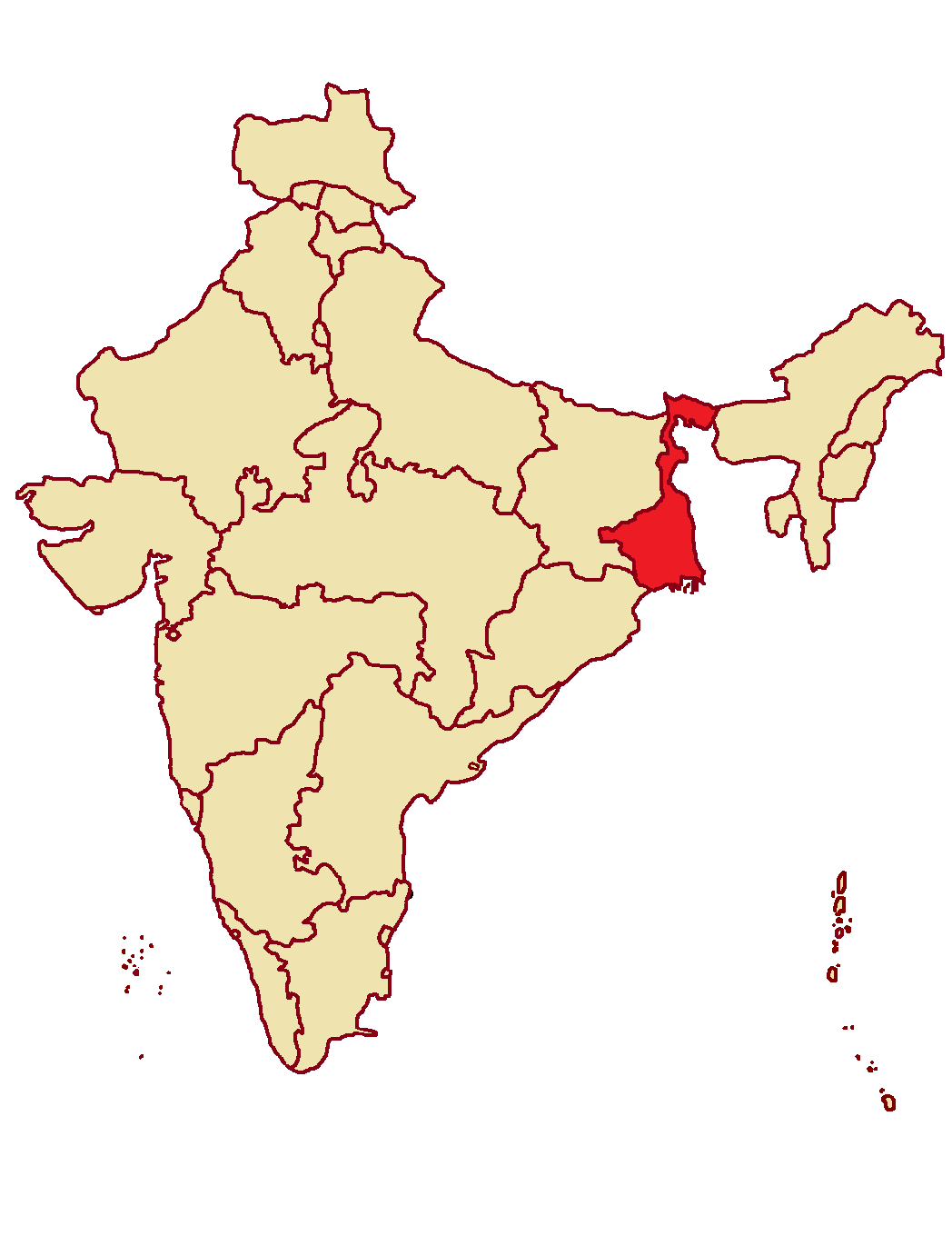
West Bengal

According to Roy (1975) three distinct factions had crystallized in the CPI unit in West Bengal in the years leading up to 1964, these three groupings had existed in the party in Bengal since the 1930s;

- the intellectuals (or Rightists) who consistently support the CPSU and the central CPI leadership. Bhowani Sen, Somnath Lahiri, Renu Chakravarti and Indrajit Gupta constituted the core of this faction, who all joined the CPI(Right) in the 1964 split.
- the Leftists, who had the support from most of the party organization. They were opposed to the CPSU and the central CPI leadership and espoused a militant revolutionary line with inspiration from Mao. Their leaders were Promode Dasgupta and Konar.
- the Centrists, led by Basu and Bhupesh Gupta. They were focused on electoral politics and sought to mediate between the factions in the party.

In West Bengal most state-level leaders sided with the CPI(Left) in the split. Likewise most of the party rank-and-file and the overwhelming majority of its trade union militants sided with CPI(M). Most of the CPI Legislative Assembly group sided with CPI(Left) including its Leader Basu and Deputy Leader Konar; as of 1964 the 30 out of the 50 CPI legislators were members of the CPI(Left). Their group also included were six CPI centrists and an independent legislator. Promode Dasgupta became the West Bengal State Committee Secretary of CPI(Left). After the split the CPI(Right) in West Bengal was led by Lahiri and Bhowani Sen. The CPI(Right) retained 12 of the CPI legislators and its legislative group was led by Lahiri.

At the time of the split the CPI(Left) was heterogeneous, with both moderate elements as well as outright pro-Peking tendencies. In West Bengal some of the district conferences of the CPI(Left) became battlegrounds between the most radical elements and the more moderate leadership. At the Calcutta Party District Conference an alternative draft program was brought forth by Parimal Dasgupta (a leading figure of the far-left in the party). Another alternative proposal was presented to the Calcutta Party District Conference by Azizul Haque, but Haque was initially banned from presenting it by the conference organisers. At the Calcutta Party District Conference 42 delegates opposed M. Basavapunniah's official draft program proposal. At the Siliguri Party District Conference, the main draft proposal for a party program was accepted, but with some additional points suggested by the far-left North Bengal cadre Charu Majumdar (Note: Charu Majumdar). However, Konar forbade the raising of the slogan Mao Tse-Tung Zindabad ('Long live Mao Zedong') at the conference.

Parimal Dasgupta's document was also presented to the leadership at the West Bengal State Conference of the left CPI. Dasgupta and a few other far-left leaders spoke at the conference, demanding the party ought to adopt the class analysis of the Indian state of the 1951 CPI conference. His proposal was, however, voted down.

Parimal Dasgupta's alternative draft program was not circulated at the Calcutta Party Congress. However, Souren Basu (Note: Souren Basu West Bengal - Member of the 1970 Politburo of the Communist Party of India (Marxist-Leninist)), a delegate from the far-left stronghold Darjeeling, asked why no portrait had been raised of Mao along the portraits of other communist stalwarts. His intervention met with applause from the delegates of the Party Congress. In late 1964 parts of the Bengali far left regrouped as the 'Revolutionary Council', including Parimal Dasgupta, Kanai Chatterjee, Subhas Bose, Md. Latif, Azizul Haque, Saibal Mitra and others. In December 1964 the CPI(Left) West Bengal State Committee set up a commission to investigate the 'Revolutionary Council', but two out three commission members were arrested soon after its formation. Apart from the Revolutionary Council, Sushital Roy Chowdhury (Note: Sushital Roy Chowdhury West Bengal - Member of the 1970 Politburo of the Communist Party of India (Marxist-Leninist).) led a faction of his own, which included Amulya Sen and Sudhir Bhattacharya (better known as Suprakash Roy).

=== Comparison of electoral performances before and after the split ===
State/Union Territory (Note: Neither CPI nor CPI(M) had any candidates in assembly elections in Goa, Daman and Diu or Nagaland during this period.)	Pre-Split Assembly elections					Post-Split Assembly elections										Ref.
State/Union Territory	Undivided CPI					CPI (Right)					CPI (Marxist)					Ref.
State/Union Territory	Candidates	Seats won	Votes	%	% in seats contested	Candidates	Seats won	Votes	% of state vote	% in seats contested	Candidates	Seats won	Votes	% of state vote	% in seats contested	Ref.
Andhra Pradesh (1962 election - 1967 election)	136 / 300	51 / 300	2,282,767	19.53%	40.58%	104 / 287	11 / 287	1,077,499	7.78%	21.22%	83 / 287	9 / 287	1,053,855	7.61%	25.40%	
Assam (1962 election - 1967 election)	31 / 105	0 / 105	156,153	6.39%	18.87%	22 / 126	7 / 126	159,905	5.15%	30.19%	14 / 126	0 / 126	61,165	1.97%	14.72%	
Bihar (1962 election - 1967 election)	84 / 318	12 / 318	613,955	6.23%	22.27%	97 / 318	24 / 318	935,977	6.91%	22.27%	32 / 318	4 / 318	173,656	1.28%	12.56%	
Gujarat (Note: CPI leaders contesting as Nutan Maha Gujarat Janta Parishad candidates not included in this estimate) (1962 election - 1967 election)	1 / 154	0 / 154	9,390	0.18%	42.10%	Did not contest					Did not contest					
Haryana (1967 election)	State created in 1966					12 / 81	0 / 81	27,238	0.90%	6.02%	8 / 81	0 / 81	16,379	0.54%	5.57%	
Himachal Pradesh (Note: The borders changed significantly between 1962 and 1967 elections, due to the Punjab Reorganisation Act, 1966.) (1962 election - 1967 election)		1 / 41				11 / 60	2 / 60	22,173	2.89%	16.76%	6 / 60	0 / 60	3,019	0.39%	4.08%	
Jammu-Kashmir (Note: The 1962 CPI figures and the 1967 CPI(M) figures correspond to the Democratic National Conference.) (1962 election - 1967 election)	20 / 75	0 / 75	31,456	4.33%	8.99%	3 / 75	0 / 75	4,315	0.54%	12.98%	20 / 75	0 / 75	26,390	3.30%	8.10%	
Kerala (1960 election - 1965 election)	108 / 126	29 / 126	3,171,732	39.14%	43.79%	79 / 133	3 / 133	525,456	8.30%	13.87%	73 / 133	40 / 133	1,257,869	19.87%	36.17%	
Madhya Pradesh (1962 election - 1967 election)	42 / 288	1 / 288	132,440	2.02%	12.32%	33 / 296	1 / 296	101,429	1.11%	9.06%	9 / 296	0 / 296	20,728	0.23%	6.47%	
Madras (1962 election - 1967 election)	68 / 206	2 / 206	978,806	7.72%	21.93%	32 / 234	2 / 234	275,932	1.80%	12.83%	22 / 234	11 / 234	623,114	4.07%	44.21%	
Maharashtra (1962 election - 1967 election)	56 / 264	6 / 264	647,390	5.90%	27.10%	41 / 270	10 / 270	651,077	4.87%	31.35%	11 / 270	1 / 270	145,083	1.08%	25.46%	
Manipur (1962 election - 1967 election)	14 / 30	0 / 30	18,899	7.13%		6 / 30	1 / 30	17,062	5.47%	23.95%	5 / 30	0 / 30	2,093	0.67%	3.41%	
Mysore (1962 election - 1967 election)	31 / 208	3 / 208	143,835	2.28%	15.29%	6 / 216	1 / 216	38,737	0.52%	19.27%	10 / 216	1 / 216	82,531	1.10%	23.46%	
Orissa (1961 election - 1967 election)	35 / 140	4 / 140	233,971	7.98%	27.32%	31 / 140	7 / 140	211,999	5.26%	20.71%	10 / 140	1 / 140	46597	1.16%	18.16%	
Pondicherry (Note: The votes listed as CPI in 1962 are those of the People's Front) (1964 election - 1969 election)	17 / 30	4 / 30	30,506	18.19%	30.45%	7 / 30	3 / 30	23,115	12.62%	49.90%	Did not contest					
Punjab (1962 election - 1967 election)	47 / 154	9 / 154	478,333	7.10%	22.64%	19 / 104	4 / 104	221,494	5.20%	8.85%	13 / 212	3 / 212	138,857	3.26%	27.73%	
Rajasthan (1962 election - 1967 election)	45 / 176	5 / 176	276,972	5.40%	18.34%	20 / 184	1 / 184	65,531	0.97%	8.12%	22 / 184	0 / 184	79,826	1.18%	8.90%	
Tripura (1962 election- 1967 election)		13 / 30				7 / 30	1 / 30	34,562	7.97%	32.57%	16 / 30	2 / 30	93,739	21.61%	41.27%	
Uttar Pradesh (1962 election - 1967 election)	147 / 430	14 / 430	905,696	5.08%	14.86%	96 / 425	13 / 425	692,942	3.23%	14.87%	57 / 425	1 / 425	272,565	1.27%	9.61%	
West Bengal (1962 election - 1967 election)	145 / 252	50 / 252	2,386,834	24.96%	40.88%	62 / 280	16 / 280	827,196	6.53%	28.59%	135 / 280	43 / 280	2,293,026	18.11%	36.14%	

== In the mass organisations ==
=== Trade union movement ===
The 1964 CPI split had a profound effect on the All India Trade Union Congress (AITUC). In 1957 Dange, as the AITUC general secretary, had outlined a two pronged approach for 'responsible' unionism - helping build the national economy whilst defending working class interests. The CPI rightists managed to retain control of AITUC after split, to a large extent due to the personal following Dange had built up within the organization he was leading since 20 years. Prominent AITUC leaders that sided with Dange were P. Balachandra Menon, Inderjit Gupta, Ranen Sen and Raj Bahadur Gour (Note: Raj Bahadur Gour). Dange had the support of 5 out of 7 AITUC Vice Presidents. AITUC President S.S. Mirajkar sided with CPI (Left), albeit mainly due to personality animosity with Dange rather than ideology. Other prominent AITUC leaders that sided with CPI(M) were P. Ramamurthi (AITUC Vice President), Monarajan Roy (AITUC West Bengal Secretary) and Ram Asrey. Only in the West Bengal unit of AITUC did the leftists have a significant influence over the organization. There were also four out of 47 members of the AITUC Working Committee who were neither members of CPI(Right) nor CPI(Left).

Unity in AITUC became strained after CPI split in 1964. The split in the party had repercussions in individual AITUC unions, and parallel unions surged in some locations as leftists sought to confront the rightists. At Bhilai Steel Plant the leftists in the AITUC-affiliated union ousted Dange and Homi Daji (Note: Homi F. Daji (1926 – 14 May 2009) Madhya Pradesh - Member of the Madhya Pradesh Legislative Assembly 1957-1962, Member of Lok Sabha 1962-1967. As of 1977 the Madhya Pradesh secretary of the All India Trade Union Congress. As of 1987, Daji was part of the 9-member Central Executive Committee of CPI. As of 1989 Daji was a member of a number of leadership bodies of CPI; Trade Union Department, the committee for the People's Publishing House and the Lawyers' Committee in Madhya Pradesh.) from the leadership positions in the union. In Bombay some leftists were expelled from an engineering union for indiscipline. In Kanpur there was strong rivalry between leftist Asrey and rightist S.S. Yusuf, who fought over control of the Suti Mill Mazdoor Sangh (SMMS). When the leftists won control of the SMMS, the rightists launched the rival Kanpur Mazdoor Sabha (KMS). KMS was registered in 1964 with S.C. Kapoor as president and Vijay Bahadur as general secretary. In Rajasthan the rightists took advantage of the imprisonment of leftist trade unionists like Punamia, Iqbal Singh, Rajbahadur Gaur and Radhaballav Aggarwal 1964–1965, and reconstituted the AITUC state unit. Once the Rajasthan leftist unionists were released from jail, they began functioning as a separate trade union centre. In Kerala there was intense rivalry between the factions in the Travancore Coir Factory Workers Union (TCFWU) until 1966 when pro-CPI(M) majority broke away and formed their own union, the Alleppey Coir Factory Thozhilali Union.

But the central organization of AITUC remained intact, with CPI(Left)/CPI(M) leaders participating in the AITUC Working Committee meetings and allowing resolutions to be passed unanimously. The CPI(M)/CPI(Right) cohabitation in AITUC would last for six years after the split. CPI(M) began preparing to build its own labour front around 1968. The delay in split in AITUC was the result of the weakness of CPI(M) in trade union movement. The CPI(M) Politburo called for a boycott of the January 1970 Guntur session of AITUC. AITUC President Mirajkar refused to obey the instruction of the CPI(M) Politburo, he presided over the Guntur session and was subsequently expelled from CPI(M).

The split in AITUC finally occurred in May 1970, as CPI(M) leaders at a 28 May 1970 Calcutta rally called for a rupture with the 'revisionists' and 'class collaborators' in the labour movement. CPI(M) set up the Centre for Indian Trade Unions as its own labour wing. The CPI(Right) organ New Age responded to the AITUC split by stating that "[t]he Tatas and the Birlas and all their dalals and black-legs could not have possibly done a greater damage to the cause of the working class than what the [CPI(M)] leadership has done now". CITU had a minor role in the trade union movement during its early period - it gathered some 35,000 members, mainly in smaller industries.

=== Peasants movement ===
As of 1963 the All India Kisan Sabha had been rendered dysfunctional as most of its key leaders and cadres had been jailed. However, by late 1963 and early 1964 most of jailed AIKS leaders and cadres were released from prison. During the 1964 split in CPI, there were efforts to retain AIKS as a united organization. However, there were tensions between the CPI(M) and CPI factions within AIKS, per Surjeet (1995) a mayor source of tension was the rejection of the rightists to demand release of jailed AIKS leaders.

Among the AIKS grassroots, the majority sided with CPI(M). But the split in the AIKS top leadership was 'somewhat uneven' per Sharma (1978). Its president, Gopalan, went to CPI(M) whilst the general secretary Bhowani Sen sided with CPI(Right). Among key Central Kisan Council members, the ones that sided with CPI(M) included Lyallpuri, Parulekar, Konar, C.H. Kanaran and N. Prasad Rao. In the CPI(Right) faction, in the Central Kisan Council key leaders included Manali C. Kandaswami, B.V. Kakkilaya, Jagannath Sarkar, Z.A. Ahmed and Karyanand Sharma.

By 1967 AIKS was divided into two parallel organizations, as a consequence of the split in the party. At the 28 August 1967 Central Kisan Council meeting in Madurai, differences arose over the membership figures. The CPI(M) faction in AIKS accused the CPI faction of presenting false inflated membership data of state units in order to increase their influence in the organization. The dispute led to a walk-out from the Central Kisan Council. A few weeks later the CPI faction would constitute a parallel All India Kisan Sabha of its own, by holding an 'All India Kisan Sabha session' at Amravati in October 1967. Since then two organizations with identical names have existed. The CPI-led AIKS is sometimes referred to as the All India Kisan Sabha (Ajoy Bhavan) and CPI(M)-led AIKS is sometimes referred to as the All India Kisan Sabha (36 Canning Lane).

== The CPI split and the international communist movement ==
The CPSU openly patronized the Dange faction in the internal dispute in CPI, and Dange in turn was completely loyal to CPSU in its conflict with CCP. According to Ram the split was accelerated by Soviet intervention, as CPSU mistook the leftists as pro-Peking. After the split had occurred, CPSU and other communist parties continued to support the CPI(Right) although the CPSU occasionally made efforts to promote reconciliation between the two Indian parties.

Once the CCP had identified Dange as supported by CPSU, they began attacking him ferociously. Whilst the Soviet press opted not to publicize the CPI split, the Chinese press overemphasized it. Regarding the CPI(Left) the CCP was favourably disposed but they felt uncertainties on the alignment of the new Indian party. When the Government of India ordered the arrest of CPI(Left) cadres on 30 December 1964 (including P. Sundarayya, M. Basavapunniah, Gopalan and P. Ramamurthi), the CCP condemned the arrest and hailed the CPI(Left) as 'revolutionaries'.

The CPI(Left) would come to adopt a policy of equidistance between the CPSU and the CCP, and the pro-CCP insurrectionist wing broke away from the CPI(M) in 1968. The insurrectionists formed the All India Coordination Committee of Communist Revolutionaries (AICCCR), later founding the Communist Party of India (Marxist-Leninist) (CPI(ML)) in 1969. Per Dutt (1971) after the split "[t]he majority in the CPM leadership was of the view that revisionism had crept into the Soviet Communist Party but it was not prepared to agree that the Soviet Union had ceased to be a socialist country altogether. The CPM also accepted that the Chinese international line was by and large correct but not in its entirety. They were particularly unwilling to accept the Chinese line on India, in particular Peking's advocacy of the strategy of immediate violent revolution. New differences developed within the CPM between the limited and wholesale followers of Peking. The dominant leadership was against total identification with Peking and at its Madurai meeting in September 1967, the CPM criticized the Chinese assessment of the Indian political situation. E. M. S. Namboodripad, whom Peking had once depicted as a true Indian Communist, had now become an arch revisionist and Peking Radio devoted a great deal of time to attacks on him."

Whilst the CPI(M) took an independent position towards both Moscow and Peking, it sought to break out of its international isolation. The Workers' Party of Korea would break the ice, as its general secretary Kim Il Sung sent a message to P. Sundarayya, praising the CPI(M) for its Marxist-Leninist stance, its independent position (a jab at the CPSU and CCP) and sought fraternal relations between the two parties. The emergence of CPI(M) as a major communist party independent from both Moscow and Peking furthered the development of polycentrism within the international communist movement.

== Aftermath ==
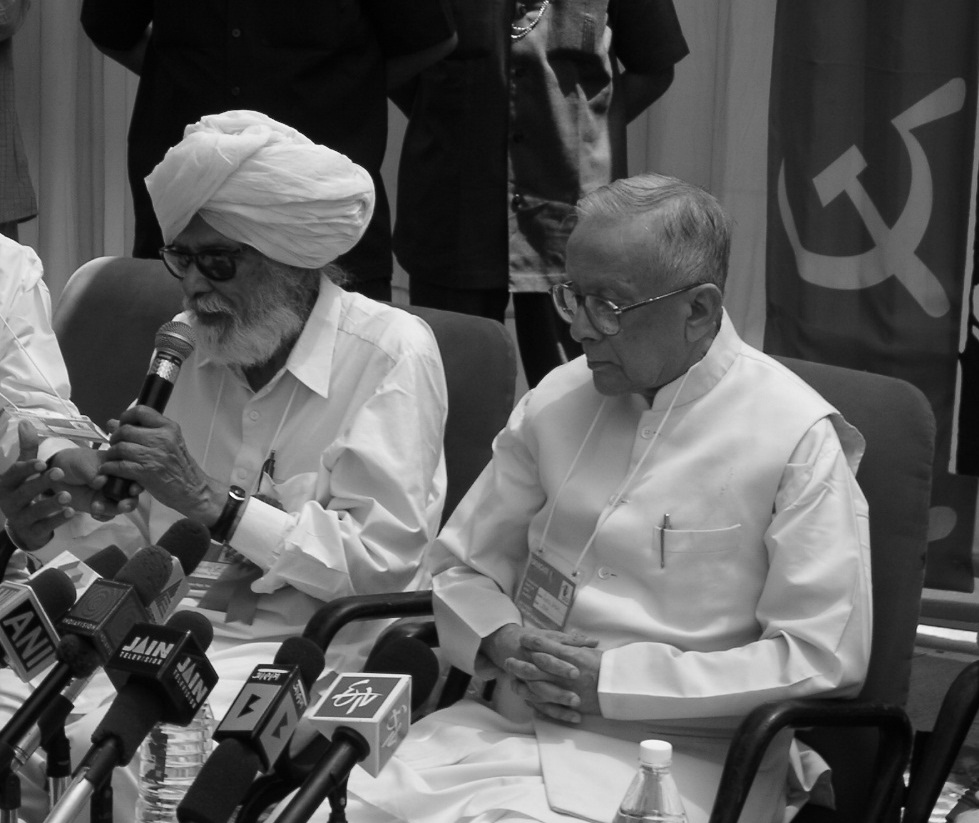
Harkishan Singh Surjeet and Jyoti Basu in 2005

In the years following the split, CPI(M) emerged as the larger and more dynamic of the two parties. The CPI(Right), later generally known as just 'CPI', supported the Indira Gandhi government during the Emergency and suffered a backlash when Gandhi was defeated in the 1977 elections. CPI(M), by contrast, emerged victorious in 1977 state assembly elections in West Bengal and Tripura. Whereas the CPI formed an alliance with the Congress and won the Kerala elections. A new factional conflict in the rump CPI emerged between 1978 and 1981. After the 1977 elections, and with CPSU and other fraternal parties advocating rapprochement between CPI and CPI(M), the two party leaderships met for the first time in Delhi on 13 April 1978, to discuss unity in action on labour, peasants and youth fronts. The 1978 eleventh Party Congress of CPI changed the tactical line of the party, rejecting the authoritarian legacy of the Indira Gandhi government.

In reaction to the CPI(M) electoral advances a new leftist vs. rightist confrontation emerged within CPI. Party leaders like the CPI general secretary C. Rajeshwar Rao, Rajashekhar Reddy (Andhra Pradesh), M. Farooqui (Delhi), A. B. Bardhan (Maharashtra), N. E. Balaram (Kerala), Vishwanath Mukherjee (West Bengal), Homi Daji (Madhya Pradesh) and Sunil Mukherjee (Bihar) formed a leftist bloc that advocated cooperation with CPI(M). Their opponents, the right-wing tendency opposed to reconciliation with CPI(M) included Indradeep Sinha and Sharma (Bihar), M. Kalyanasundaram (Tamil Nadu), C.K. Chandrappan (Kerala), P.K. Vasudevan Nair, Vyas (Rajasthan), Jagjit Singh Anand (Punjab), Renu Chakravarty (West Bengal), M.S. Krishnan (Karnataka) and Mohit Sen (Note: Mohit Sen). The leftists became the dominant faction within the party.

As CPI(M) improved its relations with the CPSU cooperation with CPI became easier. In 1980 the Left Democratic Front (gathering CPI(M), CPI and others) won the assembly election in Kerala. Ahead of the 1980 Lok Sabha election the CPI(M)-led West Bengal Left Front and CPI entered into a seat-sharing agreement. In the same year the followers Dange's pro-Indian National Congress line regrouped as the All India Communist Party. In 1981 Dange himself was expelled from CPI. CPI joined the West Bengal Left Front ahead of the 1982 Legislative Assembly election.

The 1964 split remains a bone of contention between CPI and CPI(M), even though the parties are no longer political enemies. In 2014, as CPI(M) announced plans to celebrate the 50th anniversary of the split, CPI Kerala State Council Secretary Pannyan Raveendran responded by issuing an open letter to party members arguing that the split was a disaster for the Indian left movement and that CPI(M) should have prioritized the 75th Kerala party foundation celebration over the 50th split anniversary, inviting a rebuttal from the CPI(M). CPI has proposed reunification, to which CPI(M) has responded that left unity, not party reunification, should be prioritized.
