= October 13 =

October 13 this year in various calendars
- Tuesday, 13 October 2026
Akan	Monobene
Armenian	25 Sahmi 1476
Aztec	Izcalli 11, 4 Cuetzpalin
Babylonian	30 Ululu, 2337 SE
Balinese pawukon	Menga, Kajeng, Laba, Pon, Maulu, Anggara of Kelawu, Brahma, Dadi, Pandita
Bengali	28 Ashshin, BS 1433
Chinese	Yang Metal Monkey・Wings Mansion; Fire Horse Year, Month 9, Day 4 (Hanlu, 10 days until Shuangjiang)
Common Era	13 October 2026 CE
Coptic	3 Paopi, AM 1743
Egyptian	30 Mechir, 2775 NE
Ethiopian	3 Ṭeqemt, 2019 Amätä Məhrät
French Republican	Décade III, Primidi de Vendémiaire de l'Année 235 de la République
Gregorian	13 October, AD 2026
Hebrew	2 Cheshvan, AM 5787
Hindu	Viśākhā・Prīti; Solar: 27 Āśvina, 1948 SE; Lunisolar: Tr̥tīyā, Śukla pakṣa of Āśvina, 2083 VE; Rāudra・5127 KY・1,872,861
Icelandic	Þriðjudagur, 20 Haustmánuður 2026
Islamic	1 Jumada al-awwal, AH 1448 (using tabular method)
ISO week date	2026-W42-2
Japanese	3 Nagatsuki, Reiwa 8 (Kanro, 10 days until Sōkō)
Julian	30 September, AD 2026 (AM 7534)
Julian day	2461327
Korean	3 Gaedal, 4359 DE
Maya	13.0.14.0.4; 17 Yax, 4 Kan
Roman	Pridie Kalendas Octobres, MMDCCLXXIX AUC
Solar Hijri	21 Mehr, SH 1405
Tibetan	3 tha skar, me pho rta 2153 or 1772 or 1000

<<	October					>>
Su	Mo	Tu	We	Th	Fr	Sa
				1	2	3
4	5	6	7	8	9	10
11	12	13	14	15	16	17
18	19	20	21	22	23	24
25	26	27	28	29	30	31
2026

October 13 in recent years
2026 (Tuesday)
2025 (Monday)
2024 (Sunday)
2023 (Friday)
2022 (Thursday)
2021 (Wednesday)
2020 (Tuesday)
2019 (Sunday)
2018 (Saturday)
2017 (Friday)

October 13 is the 286th day of the year (287th in leap years) in the Gregorian calendar; 79 days remain until the end of the year.

== Events ==
=== Pre-1600 ===
- 54 – Roman emperor Claudius dies from poisoning under mysterious circumstances. He is succeeded by his adopted son Nero, rather than by Britannicus, his son with Messalina.
- 409 – Vandals and Alans cross the Pyrenees and appear in Hispania.
- 1259 – The Provisions of Westminster, a law reform programme resulting out of the conflict of King Henry III of England and his barons, are approved.
- 1269 – The present church building at Westminster Abbey is consecrated.
- 1307 – Hundreds of the Knights Templar in France are arrested at dawn by King Philip the Fair, and later confess under torture to heresy.
- 1332 – Rinchinbal Khan becomes the Khagan of the Mongols and Emperor of the Yuan dynasty, reigning for only 53 days.
- 1399 – Coronation of Henry IV of England at Westminster Abbey.
- 1479 – Hungarian forces under Stephen V Báthory decisively defeat an invading Ottoman army in the battle of Breadfield.

=== 1601–1900 ===
- 1644 – A Swedish–Dutch fleet defeats the Danish fleet at Fehmarn and captures about 1,000 prisoners.
- 1710 – Port Royal, the capital of French Acadia, falls in a siege by British forces.
- 1775 – The Continental Congress establishes the Continental Navy (predecessor of the United States Navy).
- 1792 – In Washington, D.C., the cornerstone of the United States Executive Mansion (known as the White House since 1818) is laid.
- 1793 – French Revolutionary Wars: Austro-Prussian victory over Republican France at the First Battle of Wissembourg.
- 1812 – War of 1812: Sir Isaac Brock's British and native forces repel an invasion of Canada by General Rensselaer's United States forces.
- 1821 – The Declaration of Independence of the Mexican Empire is publicly proclaimed.
- 1843 – In New York City, B'nai B'rith, the oldest Jewish service organization in the world, is founded.
- 1881 – First known conversation in modern Hebrew by Eliezer Ben-Yehuda and friends.
- 1885 – The Georgia Institute of Technology is founded in Atlanta, Georgia.
- 1892 – Edward Emerson Barnard is first to discover a comet by photographic means.

=== 1901–present ===
- 1903 – The Boston Red Sox win the first modern World Series, defeating the Pittsburgh Pirates in the eighth game.
- 1908 – Margaret Travers Symons bursts into the UK parliament and becomes the first woman to speak there.
- 1911 – Prince Arthur, Duke of Connaught and Strathearn, becomes the first Governor General of Canada of royal descent.
- 1915 – First World War: The Battle of the Hohenzollern Redoubt marks the end of the Battle of Loos.
- 1917 – The "Miracle of the Sun" is witnessed by an estimated 70,000 people in the Cova da Iria in Portugal.
- 1921 – Soviet republics sign the Treaty of Kars to formalize the borders between Turkey and the South Caucasus states.
- 1923 – Ankara becomes the capital of Turkey.
- 1943 – World War II: Marshal Pietro Badoglio announces that Italy has officially declared war on Germany.
- 1944 – World War II: The Soviet Riga Offensive captures the city.
- 1946 – France adopts the constitution of the Fourth Republic.
- 1972 – Aeroflot Flight 217 crashes outside Moscow, killing 174.
- 1972 – Uruguayan Air Force Flight 571 crashes in the Andes mountains. Twenty-eight survive the crash. All but 16 succumb before rescue on December 23.
- 1972 – The flag of Okinawa Prefecture, Japan, was officially adopted.
- 1976 – The first electron micrograph of an Ebola virus is taken at the Centers for Disease Control and Prevention by Dr. F. A. Murphy.
- 1976 – A Lloyd Aéreo Boliviano Boeing 707 crashes after takeoff from El Trompillo Airport in Santa Cruz de la Sierra, Bolivia, killing 91.
- 1977 – Hijacking of Lufthansa Flight 181 by the Popular Front for the Liberation of Palestine.
- 1983 – Ameritech Mobile Communications launches the first US cellular network in Chicago.
- 1990 – Syrian forces attack free areas of Lebanon, removing General Michel Aoun from the presidential palace.
- 1993 – At least 60 people die in eastern Papua New Guinea when a series of earthquakes rock the Finisterre Range, triggering massive landslides.
- 2010 – The mining accident in Copiapó, Chile ends as all 33 trapped miners arrive at the surface after a record 69 days underground.
- 2013 – A stampede occurs in India during the Hindu festival Navratri, killing 115 and injuring more than 110.
- 2016 – The Maldives announces its decision to withdraw from the Commonwealth of Nations.
- 2019 – Kenyan Brigid Kosgei sets a new women's world record with a time of 2:14:04 at the 2019 Chicago Marathon.

== Births ==
=== Pre-1600 ===
- 467 – Emperor Xiaowen of Northern Wei, emperor of Northern Wei (died 499)
- 1381 – Thomas FitzAlan, 12th Earl of Arundel, English politician, Lord High Treasurer of England (died 1415)
- 1453 – Edward of Westminster, Prince of Wales, son and heir of Henry VI of England (died 1471)
- 1474 – Mariotto Albertinelli, Italian painter and educator (died 1515)
- 1499 – Claude of France (died 1524)
- 1563 – Francis Caracciolo, Italian Catholic priest (died 1608)
- 1566 – Richard Boyle, 1st Earl of Cork, Irish politician, Lord High Treasurer of Ireland (died 1643)

=== 1601–1900 ===
- 1613 – Luisa de Guzmán, Spanish-Portuguese wife of John IV of Portugal (died 1666)
- 1696 – John Hervey, 2nd Baron Hervey, English courtier and politician, Lord Privy Seal (died 1743)
- 1703 – Andrea Belli, Maltese architect and businessman (died 1772)
- 1713 – Allan Ramsay, Scottish-English painter (died 1784)
- 1756 – James Gambier, 1st Baron Gambier, English admiral and politician, 36th Commodore Governor of Newfoundland (died 1833)
- 1768 – Jacques Félix Emmanuel Hamelin, French admiral and explorer (died 1839)
- 1820 – John William Dawson, Canadian geologist and academic (died 1899)
- 1821 – Rudolf Virchow, German physician, biologist, and politician (died 1902)
- 1825 – Charles Frederick Worth, English fashion designer, founded House of Worth (died 1895)
- 1844 – Ernest Myers, English poet and author (died 1921)
- 1853 – Lillie Langtry, English actress and singer (died 1929)
- 1862 – Mary Kingsley, English explorer and author (died 1900)
- 1867 – Jacques Inaudi, Italian calculating prodigy (died 1950)
- 1870 – Albert Jay Nock, American theorist, author, and critic (died 1945)
- 1872 – Leon Leonwood Bean, American hunter, businessman, and author, founded L.L.Bean (died 1967)
- 1873 – Georgios Kafantaris, Greek politician and Prime Minister of Greece (died 1946)
- 1874 – József Klekl, Slovene-Hungarian priest and politician (died 1948)
- 1876 – Rube Waddell, American baseball player (died 1914)
- 1878 – Patrick Joseph Hartigan, Australian priest and author (died 1952)
- 1879 – Edward Hennig, American gymnast (died 1960)
- 1880 – Sasha Chorny, Russian poet and author (died 1932)
- 1887 – Jozef Tiso, Slovak priest and politician, President of Slovakia (died 1947)
- 1890 – Conrad Richter, American journalist and novelist (died 1968)
- 1891 – Irene Rich, American actress (died 1988)
- 1893 – Kurt Reidemeister, German mathematician connected to the Vienna Circle (died 1971)
- 1895 – Mike Gazella, American baseball player and manager (died 1978)
- 1899 – Piero Dusio, Italian footballer, businessman and racing driver (died 1975)
- 1900 – Gerald Marks, American composer (died 1997)

=== 1901–present ===
- 1902 – Arna Bontemps, American librarian, author, and poet (died 1973)
- 1902 – Karl Leichter, Estonian musicologist and academic (died 1987)
- 1904 – Wilfred Pickles, English actor and radio host (died 1978)
- 1905 – Yves Allégret, French director and screenwriter (died 1987)
- 1905 – John Rinehart Blue, American military officer, educator, businessperson, and politician (died 1965)
- 1905 – Coloman Braun-Bogdan, Romanian footballer and manager (died 1983)
- 1909 – Herblock, American author and illustrator (died 2001)
- 1909 – Art Tatum, American jazz pianist (died 1956)
- 1911 – Ashok Kumar, Indian film actor (died 2001)
- 1911 – Millosh Gjergj Nikolla, Albanian poet and author (died 1938)
- 1912 – Cornel Wilde, Slovak-American actor, director, producer, and screenwriter (died 1989)
- 1913 – Igor Torkar, Slovenian poet and playwright (died 2004)
- 1915 – Terry Frost, English painter and academic (died 2003)
- 1917 – Reed Erickson, American philanthropist (died 1992)
- 1917 – George Osmond, American talent manager (died 2007)
- 1918 – Robert Walker, American actor (died 1951)
- 1920 – Laraine Day, American actress (died 2007)
- 1921 – Yves Montand, Italian-French actor and singer (died 1991)
- 1922 – Nathaniel Clifton, American athlete (died 1990)
- 1922 – Gilberto Mendes, Brazilian composer (died 2016)
- 1923 – John C. Champion, American screenwriter and producer (died 1994)
- 1923 – Rosemary Anne Sisson, English author and playwright (died 2017)
- 1923 – Faas Wilkes, Dutch footballer (died 2006)
- 1924 – Terry Gibbs, American vibraphone player and bandleader
- 1924 – Moturu Udayam, Indian activist and politician (died 2002)
- 1924 – Roberto Eduardo Viola, Argentinian general and politician, 44th President of Argentina (died 1994)
- 1925 – Lenny Bruce, American comedian and actor (died 1966)
- 1925 – Armand Mouyal, Algerian-French fencer and police officer (died 1988)
- 1925 – Margaret Thatcher, English chemist and politician, Prime Minister of the United Kingdom (died 2013)
- 1925 – Gustav Winckler, Danish singer-songwriter (died 1979)
- 1926 – Ray Brown, American bassist and cellist (died 2002)
- 1926 – Killer Kowalski, American wrestler (died 2008)
- 1926 – Tommy Whittle, Scottish-English saxophonist (died 2013)
- 1926 – Eddie Yost, American baseball player and coach (died 2012)
- 1927 – Anita Kerr, American singer and arranger (died 2022)
- 1927 – Lee Konitz, American saxophonist and composer (died 2020)
- 1927 – Turgut Özal, Turkish engineer and politician, 8th President of Turkey (died 1993)
- 1929 – Richard Howard, American poet, critic, and translator (died 2022)
- 1929 – Walasse Ting, Chinese-American painter and poet (died 2010)
- 1930 – Bruce Geller, American screenwriter and producer (died 1978)
- 1931 – Raymond Kopa, French footballer (died 2017)
- 1931 – Eddie Mathews, American baseball player and manager (died 2001)
- 1932 – Johnny Lytle, American vibraphone player and drummer (died 1995)
- 1932 – Liliane Montevecchi, French-Italian actress, dancer and singer (died 2018)
- 1933 – Thomas Bingham, Baron Bingham of Cornhill, English lawyer and judge, Lord Chief Justice of England and Wales (died 2012)
- 1933 – Raynald Fréchette, Canadian lawyer, judge, and politician (died 2007)
- 1934 – Nana Mouskouri, Greek singer and politician
- 1935 – Etterlene DeBarge, American singer-songwriter (died 2024)
- 1935 – Bruce Morrow, American radio host and actor
- 1936 – Chitti Babu, Indian veena player and composer (died 1996)
- 1938 – Shirley Caesar, American gospel singer-songwriter
- 1938 – Hugo Young, English journalist and author (died 2003)
- 1939 – Larry Bowie, American football player (died 2012)
- 1939 – Melinda Dillon, American actress (died 2023)
- 1940 – Chris Farlowe, English rock, blues, and soul singer
- 1940 – Pharoah Sanders, American saxophonist and bandleader (died 2022)
- 1941 – Neil Aspinall, Welsh-English record producer and manager (died 2008)
- 1941 – Jim Price, American baseball player (died 2023)
- 1941 – Paul Simon, American singer-songwriter, guitarist, and producer
- 1941 – John Snow, English cricketer
- 1942 – Rutanya Alda, Latvian-American actress
- 1942 – Bob Bailey, American baseball player and manager (died 2018)
- 1942 – Jerry Jones, American businessman
- 1942 – Walter McGowan, Scottish boxer (died 2016)
- 1943 – Peter Sauber, Swiss businessman, founded the Sauber F1 Team
- 1944 – Robert Lamm, American singer-songwriter, pianist, and producer
- 1945 – Dési Bouterse, Surinamese general and politician, 9th President of Suriname (died 2024)
- 1945 – Poure Puobe VII Paramount Chief of Nandom in the Upper East Region of Ghana (died 2019)
- 1946 – Levon Ananyan, Armenian journalist and author (died 2013)
- 1946 – Edwina Currie, English politician
- 1946 – Lacy J. Dalton, American country music singer-songwriter and guitarist
- 1947 – Joe Dolce, American-Australian singer-songwriter and guitarist
- 1947 – Sammy Hagar, American singer-songwriter, guitarist, and producer
- 1948 – Nusrat Fateh Ali Khan, Pakistani musician (died 1997)
- 1949 – Tom Mees, American sportscaster (died 1996)
- 1949 – Patrick Nève, Belgian racing driver (died 2017)
- 1950 – Mollie Katzen, American chef and author
- 1950 – Simon Nicol, English singer-songwriter, guitarist, and producer
- 1950 – Annegret Richter, German sprinter
- 1951 – Stephen Bayley, Welsh journalist, author, and critic
- 1952 – Mundo Earwood, American singer-songwriter and guitarist (died 2014)
- 1952 – Beverly Johnson, American model, actress, and singer
- 1952 – John Lone, Hong Kong-American actor
- 1953 – Pat Day, American jockey
- 1954 – George Frazier, American baseball player and sportscaster (died 2023)
- 1954 – Claude Ribbe, French historian and academic
- 1956 – Chris Carter, American director, producer, and screenwriter
- 1956 – Sinan Sakić, Serbian singer (died 2018)
- 1956 – Joseph Toal, Scottish bishop
- 1957 – Reggie Theus, American basketball player and coach
- 1958 – Maria Cantwell, American lawyer and politician
- 1958 – Jamal Khashoggi, Saudi journalist, dissident, writer and editor (died 2018)
- 1958 – Jair-Rôhm Parker Wells, American bassist and composer
- 1959 – Marie Osmond, American singer, actress, and television spokesperson
- 1960 – Joey Belladonna, American singer and songwriter
- 1960 – Ari Fleischer, American media consultant and 21st White House Press Secretary
- 1960 – Eric Joyce, Scottish soldier and politician
- 1961 – Rachel De Thame, English gardener and television presenter
- 1961 – Derek Harper, American basketball player
- 1961 – Doc Rivers, American basketball player and coach
- 1962 – T'Keyah Crystal Keymáh, American actress and author
- 1962 – Kelly Preston, American actress (died 2020)
- 1962 – Jerry Rice, American football player
- 1963 – Colin Channer, Jamaican-American author and academic
- 1963 – Chip Foose, American engineer and television host
- 1964 – Fanie de Villiers, South African cricketer
- 1964 – Doug Emhoff, American lawyer and second gentleman of the United States
- 1964 – Nie Haisheng, Chinese general, pilot, and astronaut
- 1964 – Christopher Judge, American actor and producer
- 1964 – Marco Travaglio, Italian journalist and author
- 1964 – Matt Walsh, American actor and comedian
- 1965 – Johan Museeuw, Belgian cyclist
- 1966 – Larry Collmus, American sportscaster
- 1966 – Baja Mali Knindža, Serbian singer
- 1966 – John Regis, English sprinter
- 1967 – Aleksander Čeferin, Slovenian lawyer and football administrator, 7th president of UEFA
- 1967 – Scott Cooper, American baseball player
- 1967 – Trevor Hoffman, American baseball player
- 1967 – Javier Sotomayor, Cuban high jumper
- 1967 – Steve Vickers, English footballer
- 1967 – Kate Walsh, American actress and producer
- 1968 – Tisha Campbell-Martin, American actress and singer
- 1969 – Nancy Kerrigan, American figure skater and actress
- 1969 – Cady McClain, American actress and singer
- 1970 – Serena Altschul, American journalist
- 1970 – Rob Howley, Welsh rugby player and coach
- 1970 – Paul Potts, English tenor
- 1971 – Sacha Baron Cohen, English comedian, actor, and screenwriter
- 1971 – Billy Bush, American television journalist and radio host
- 1971 – Pyrros Dimas, Albanian-Greek weightlifter and politician
- 1972 – Summer Sanders, American swimmer and sportscaster
- 1973 – Brian Dawkins, American football player and coach
- 1973 – Matt Hughes, American wrestler and mixed martial artist
- 1977 – Gareth Batty, English cricketer
- 1977 – Benjamin Clapp, American drummer
- 1977 – Antonio Di Natale, Italian footballer
- 1977 – Justin Peroff, Canadian drummer and actor
- 1977 – Paul Pierce, American basketball player
- 1977 – Kiele Sanchez, American actress
- 1978 – Jermaine O'Neal, American basketball player
- 1979 – Wes Brown, English footballer
- 1979 – Mamadou Niang, Senegalese footballer
- 1980 – Ashanti, American singer-songwriter, producer, and actress
- 1980 – David Haye, English boxer
- 1980 – Magne Hoseth, Norwegian footballer
- 1980 – Scott Parker, English footballer
- 1981 – Taylor Buchholz, American baseball player
- 1981 – Kele Okereke, English singer, songwriter, and musician
- 1982 – Antonio Pavanello, Italian rugby player
- 1982 – Ian Thorpe, Australian swimmer
- 1985 – Brian Hoyer, American football player
- 1985 – Andrej Meszároš, Slovak ice hockey player
- 1986 – Gabriel Agbonlahor, English footballer
- 1986 – Sergio Pérez Moya, Mexican footballer
- 1987 – Adrian Poparadu, Romanian footballer
- 1987 – Tochinoshin Tsuyoshi, Georgian sumo wrestler
- 1988 – Norris Cole, American basketball player
- 1988 – Scott Jamieson, Australian footballer
- 1989 – Brace Belden, American communist and trade union activist, volunteer in the People's Protection Units
- 1989 – Alexandria Ocasio-Cortez, American politician
- 1989 – Clive Rose, Australian cricketer
- 1990 – Andrej Rendla, Slovak footballer
- 1990 – Adrián Sardinero, Spanish footballer
- 1990 – Jakob Silfverberg, Swedish ice hockey player
- 1992 – Igor Ozhiganov, Russian ice hockey player
- 1992 – Shelby Rogers, American tennis player
- 1993 – Tiffany Trump, American socialite
- 1994 – Ryan Matterson, Australian rugby league player
- 1994 – Yuta Watanabe, Japanese basketball player
- 1995 – Jimin, South Korean singer
- 1996 – Joshua Wong, Hong Kong pro-democracy activist
- 1999 – Andrew Capobianco. American diver
- 2000 – Anastasia Kingsnorth, British YouTuber
- 2001 – Caleb McLaughlin, American actor
- 2001 – Cam Thomas, American basketball player
- 2001 – De'Von Achane, American football player

== Deaths ==
=== Pre-1600 ===
- 54 – Claudius, Roman emperor (born 10 BC)
- 807 – Simpert, bishop of Augsburg
- 982 – Jing Zong, emperor of the Liao Dynasty (born 948)
- 1093 – Robert I, count of Flanders (born 1035)
- 1100 – Guy I, count of Ponthieu
- 1195 – Gualdim Pais, Portuguese crusader (born 1118)
- 1282 – Nichiren, Japanese Buddhist priest (born 1222)
- 1382 – Peter II, king of Cyprus
- 1415 – Thomas FitzAlan, 12th Earl of Arundel, English politician, Lord High Treasurer of England (born 1381)
- 1435 – Hermann II, count of Croatia
- 1562 – Claudin de Sermisy, French composer (born 1495)

=== 1601–1900 ===
- 1605 – Theodore Beza, French theologian and scholar (born 1519)
- 1673 – Christoffer Gabel, German-Danish accountant and politician (born 1617)
- 1687 – Geminiano Montanari, Italian astronomer and lens maker (born 1633)
- 1694 – Samuel von Pufendorf, German historian, economist, and jurist (born 1632)
- 1706 – Iyasu I, emperor of Ethiopia (born 1654)
- 1715 – Nicolas Malebranche, French priest and philosopher (born 1638)
- 1759 – John Henley, English clergyman and author (born 1692)
- 1788 – Robert Nugent, 1st Earl Nugent, Irish poet and politician (born 1702)
- 1796 – William B. Whiting, New York politician (born 1731)
- 1812 – Isaac Brock, English general and politician, Lieutenant Governor of Upper Canada (born 1769)
- 1815 – Joachim Murat, French general (born 1767)
- 1822 – Antonio Canova, Italian sculptor (born 1757)
- 1825 – Maximilian I Joseph, king of Bavaria (born 1756)
- 1841 – Patrick Campbell, Scottish admiral (born 1773)
- 1869 – Charles Augustin Sainte-Beuve, French poet, author, and critic (born 1804)
- 1882 – Arthur de Gobineau, French philosopher and author (born 1816)
- 1890 – Samuel Freeman Miller, American lawyer and jurist (born 1816)

=== 1901–present ===
- 1904 – Pavlos Melas, French-Greek captain (born 1870)
- 1905 – Henry Irving, English actor and manager (born 1838)
- 1909 – Francesc Ferrer i Guàrdia, Spanish philosopher and academic (born 1849)
- 1911 – Sister Nivedita, Irish-Indian social worker, author, and educator (born 1867)
- 1917 – Florence La Badie, American actress (born 1888)
- 1919 – Karl Adolph Gjellerup, Danish author and poet, Nobel Prize laureate (born 1857)
- 1926 – Hans E. Kinck, Norwegian philologist and author (born 1865)
- 1930 – T. Alexander Harrison, American painter and educator (born 1853)
- 1931 – Ernst Didring, Swedish author (born 1868)
- 1938 – E. C. Segar, American cartoonist, created Popeye (born 1894)
- 1945 – Milton S. Hershey, American businessman, founded The Hershey Company (born 1857)
- 1950 – Ernest Haycox, American soldier and author (born 1899)
- 1955 – Manuel Ávila Camacho, Mexican general and politician, 45th President of Mexico (born 1897)
- 1956 – Cahit Sıtkı Tarancı, Turkish poet and author (born 1910)
- 1961 – Prince Louis Rwagasore, Burundi politician, Prime Minister of Burundi (born 1932)
- 1966 – Clifton Webb, American actor and dancer (born 1889)
- 1968 – Bea Benaderet, American actress and voice artist (born 1906)
- 1973 – Cevat Şakir Kabaağaçlı, Turkish ethnographer and author (born 1886)
- 1973 – Albert Mandler, Austrian-Israeli general (born 1929)
- 1974 – Otto Binder, American author (born 1911)
- 1974 – Anatoli Kozhemyakin, Soviet footballer (born 1953)
- 1974 – Ed Sullivan, American journalist and talk show host (born 1901)
- 1979 – Rebecca Clarke, English viola player and composer (born 1886)
- 1981 – Antonio Berni, Argentinian painter, illustrator, and engraver (born 1905)
- 1985 – Tage Danielsson, Swedish author, actor, and director (born 1928)
- 1987 – Walter Houser Brattain, American physicist and engineer, Nobel Prize laureate (born 1902)
- 1987 – Kishore Kumar, Indian singer-songwriter, producer, actor, and director (born 1929)
- 1987 – Nilgün Marmara, Turkish poet and author (born 1958)
- 1990 – Hans Namuth, German-American photographer (born 1915)
- 1990 – Lê Đức Thọ, Vietnamese general and politician, Nobel Prize laureate (born 1911)
- 1992 – James Marshall, American author and illustrator (born 1942)
- 1993 – Otmar Gutmann, German filmmaker (born 1937)
- 1996 – Beryl Reid, English actress (born 1919)
- 1998 – Dmitry Nikolayevich Filippov, Russian businessman and politician (born 1944)
- 1999 – Michael Hartnett, Irish poet (born 1941)
- 2000 – Jean Peters, American actress (born 1926)
- 2001 – Peter Doyle, Australian singer-songwriter (born 1949)
- 2002 – Stephen Ambrose, American historian and author (born 1936)
- 2002 – Keene Curtis, American actor (born 1923)
- 2003 – Bertram Brockhouse, Canadian physicist and academic, Nobel Prize laureate (born 1918)
- 2004 – Enrique Fernando, Filipino lawyer and jurist, 13th Chief Justice of the Supreme Court of the Philippines (born 1915)
- 2004 – Bernice Rubens, Welsh author (born 1928)
- 2005 – Vivian Malone Jones, American activist (born 1942)
- 2006 – Wang Guangmei, Chinese philanthropist and politician, 2nd Spouse of the President of the People's Republic of China (born 1921)
- 2007 – Bob Denard, French soldier and academic (born 1929)
- 2008 – Alexei Cherepanov, Russian ice hockey player (born 1989)
- 2009 – Stephen Barnett, American scholar and academic (born 1935)
- 2010 – Vernon Biever, American photographer (born 1923)
- 2011 – Barbara Kent, Canadian-born American actress (born 1907)
- 2012 – Stuart Bell, English lawyer and politician (born 1938)
- 2012 – Gary Collins, American actor (born 1938)
- 2012 – Tomonobu Imamichi, Japanese philosopher and academic (born 1922)
- 2013 – Martin Drewes, German soldier and pilot (born 1918)
- 2013 – Joe Meriweather, American basketball player and coach (born 1953)
- 2013 – Tommy Whittle, Scottish-English saxophonist (born 1926)
- 2013 – Takashi Yanase, Japanese poet and illustrator, created Anpanman (born 1919)
- 2014 – John Bradfield, English biologist and businessman, founded Cambridge Science Park (born 1925)
- 2014 – Antonio Cafiero, Argentinian accountant and politician, Governor of Buenos Aires Province (born 1922)
- 2014 – Margaret Hillert, American author and poet (born 1920)
- 2014 – Mohammad Sarengat, Indonesian sprinter (born 1939)
- 2014 – Pontus Segerström, Swedish footballer (born 1981)
- 2015 – Rosalyn Baxandall, American historian, author, and academic (born 1939)
- 2015 – Bruce Hyde, American academic and actor (born 1941)
- 2015 – Michael J. H. Walsh, English general (born 1927)
- 2016 – Bhumibol Adulyadej (Rama IX), King of Thailand (born 1927)
- 2016 – Dario Fo, Italian playwright, actor, director, and composer, Nobel Prize laureate (born 1926)
- 2016 – Jim Prentice, Canadian lawyer and politician, 16th Premier of Alberta (born 1956)
- 2017 – Albert Zafy, Malagasy politician (born 1927)
- 2018 – Annapurna Devi, Indian surbahar (bass sitar) player (born 1927)
- 2023 – Louise Glück, American poet and essayist (born 1943)
- 2024 – Mayra Gómez Kemp, Cuban-Spanish television host and actress (born 1948)
- 2024 – Donal Murray, Irish Catholic bishop (born 1940)
- 2026 – Ken Friar, English businessman and life president of Arsenal Football Club (born 1934)

== Holidays and observances ==
- Azerbaijani Railway Day (Azerbaijan)
- Christian feast day:
  - Blessed Alexandrina of Balasar
  - Chelidonia
  - Edward the Confessor (translation)
  - Gerald of Aurillac
  - Lubentius
  - Blessed Maddalena Panattieri, (OP)
  - Romulus of Genoa
  - Theophilus of Antioch
  - Venantius of Berri
  - October 13 (Eastern Orthodox liturgics)
- Doi taikomatsuri October 13–15 (Shikokuchūō, Ehime, Japan)
- International Day for Disaster Risk Reduction (international)
- Paramedics' Day (Poland)
- Rwagasore Day (Burundi)
