= Necedah Shrine =

Site of disputed Marian apparitions in Necedah, Wisconsin

Coordinates: 44°1′17″N 090°3′21″W

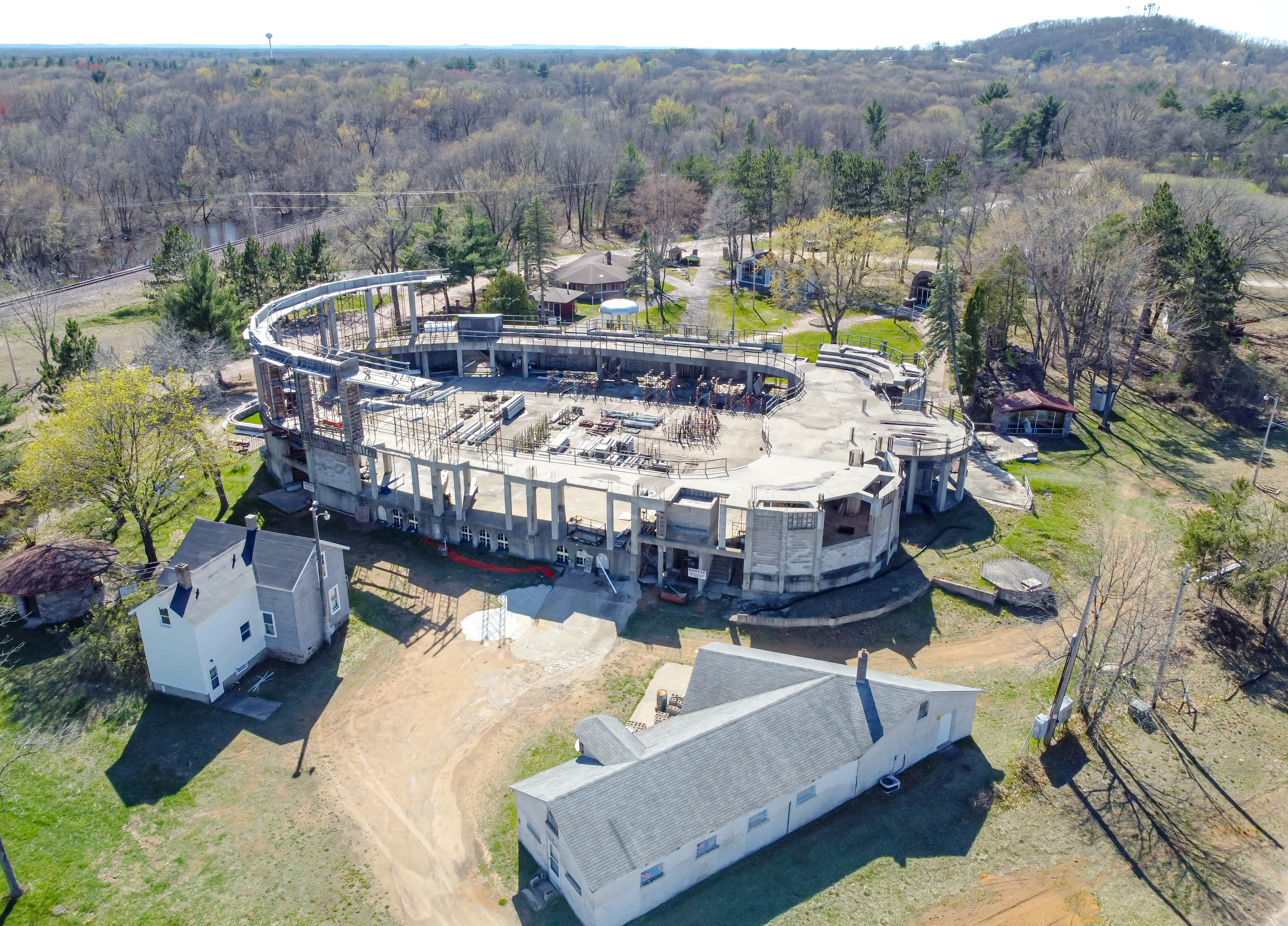
- Queen of the Holy Rosary, Mediatrix of Peace Shrine

Religion
- Affiliation: Old Catholicism
- Sect: For My God and Country
- Region: North America
- Deity: The Virgin Mary
- Ecclesiastical or organisational status: Most holy site
- Status: Active

Location
- Municipality: Town of Necedah
- State: Wisconsin
- Country: United States
- Interactive map of Necedah Shrine

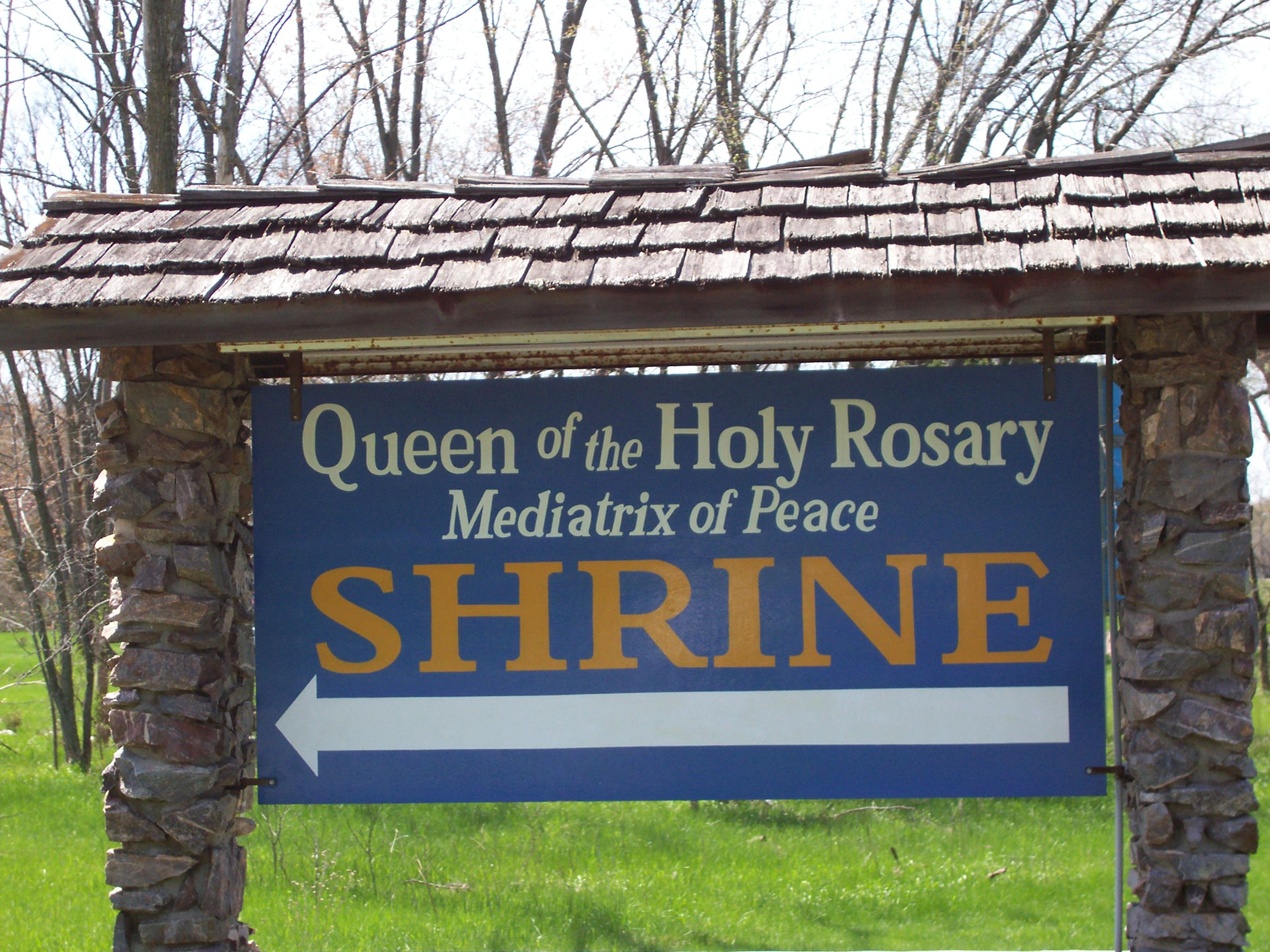
Welcome sign to the shrine

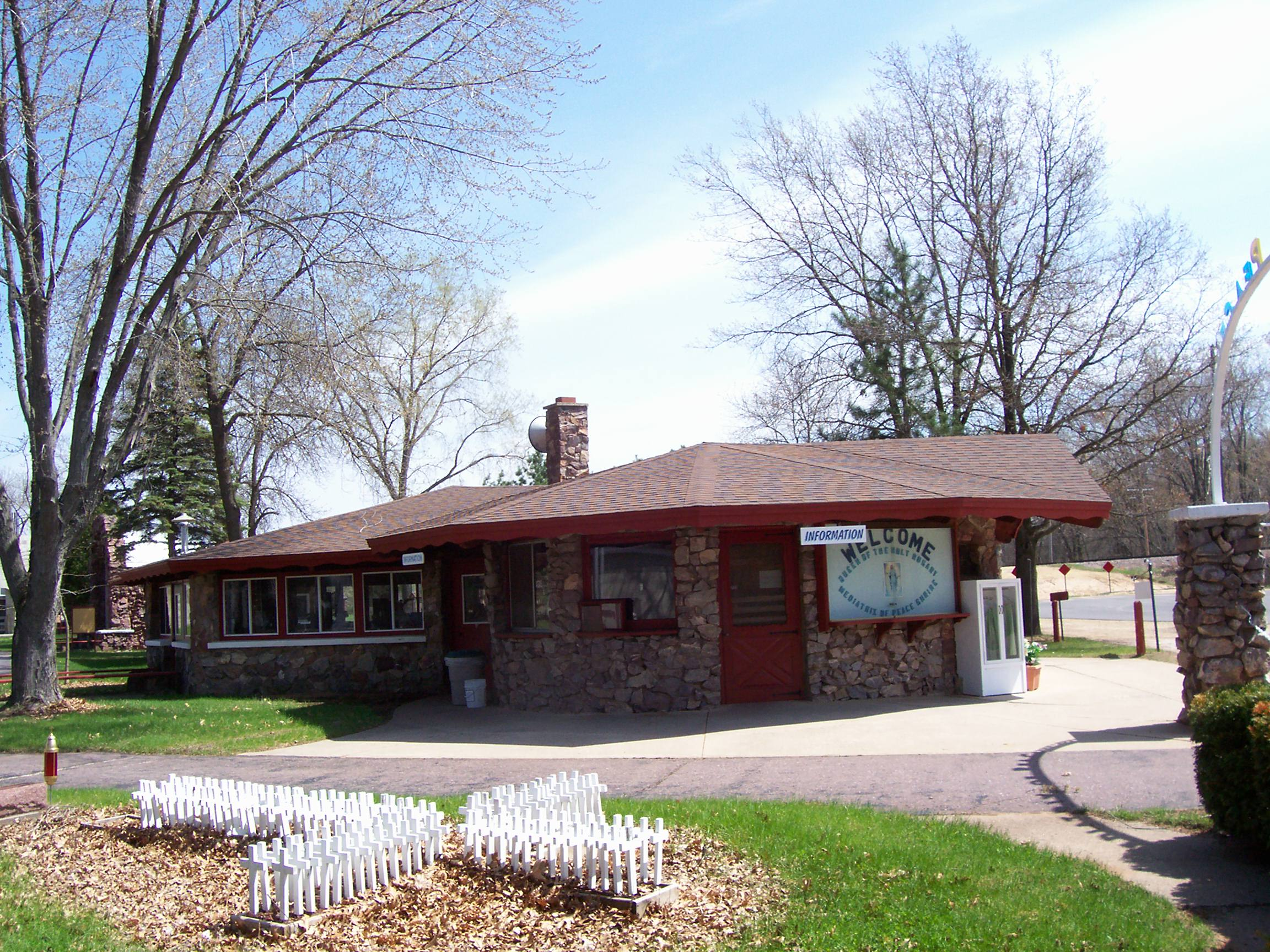
Welcome center of the shrine

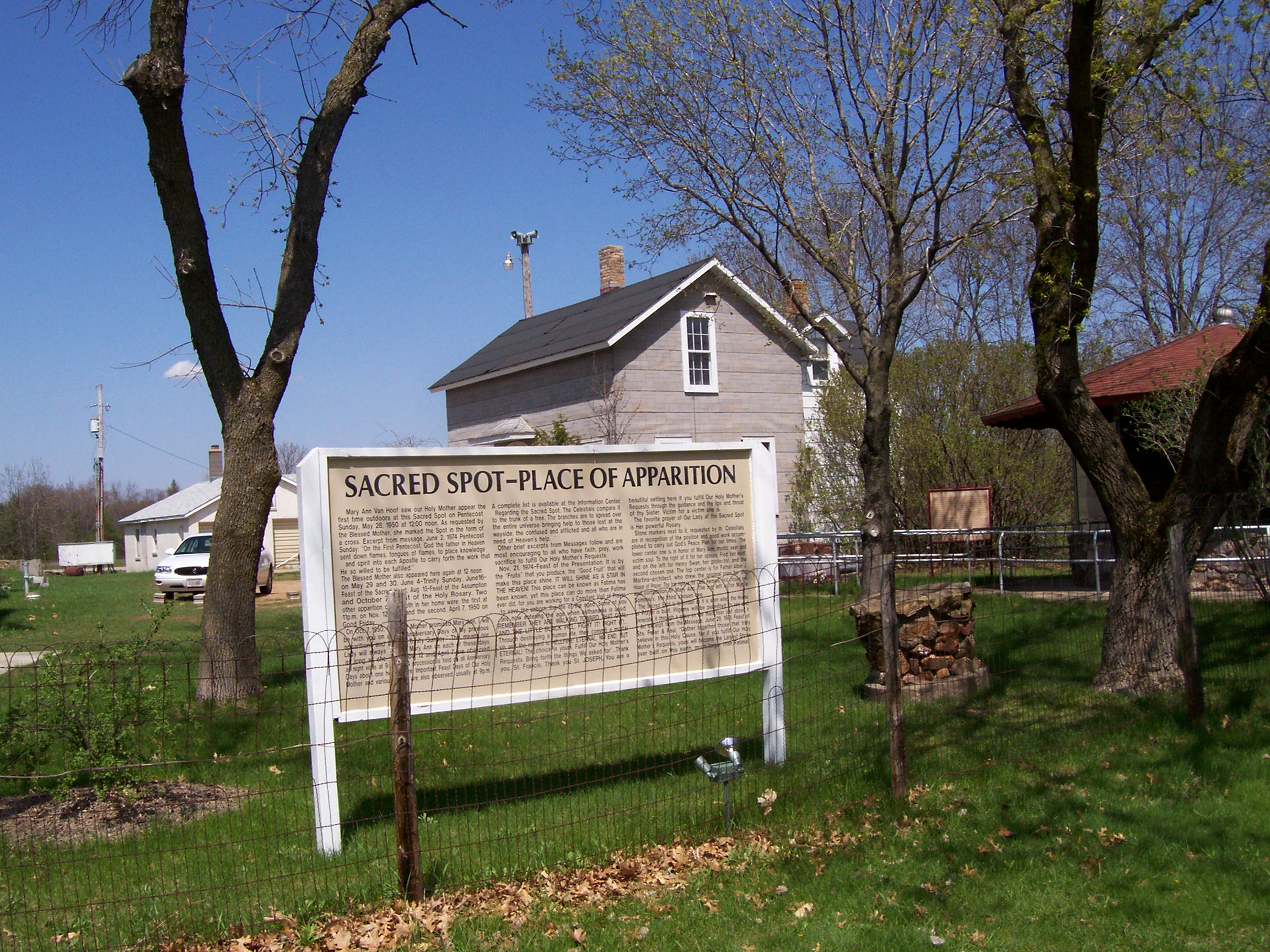
Supposed spot of Marian apparition

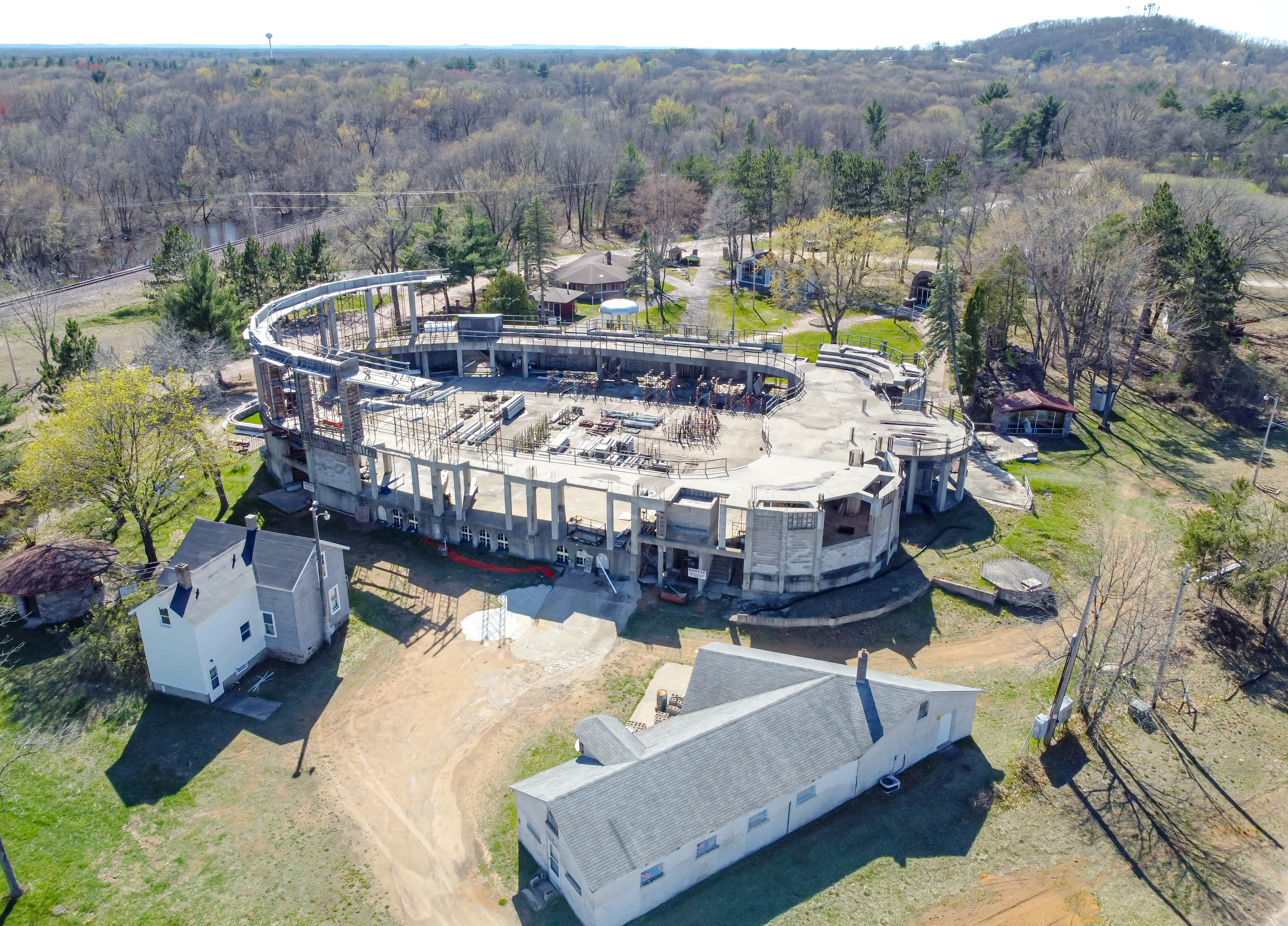
The Necedah Shrine in 2024

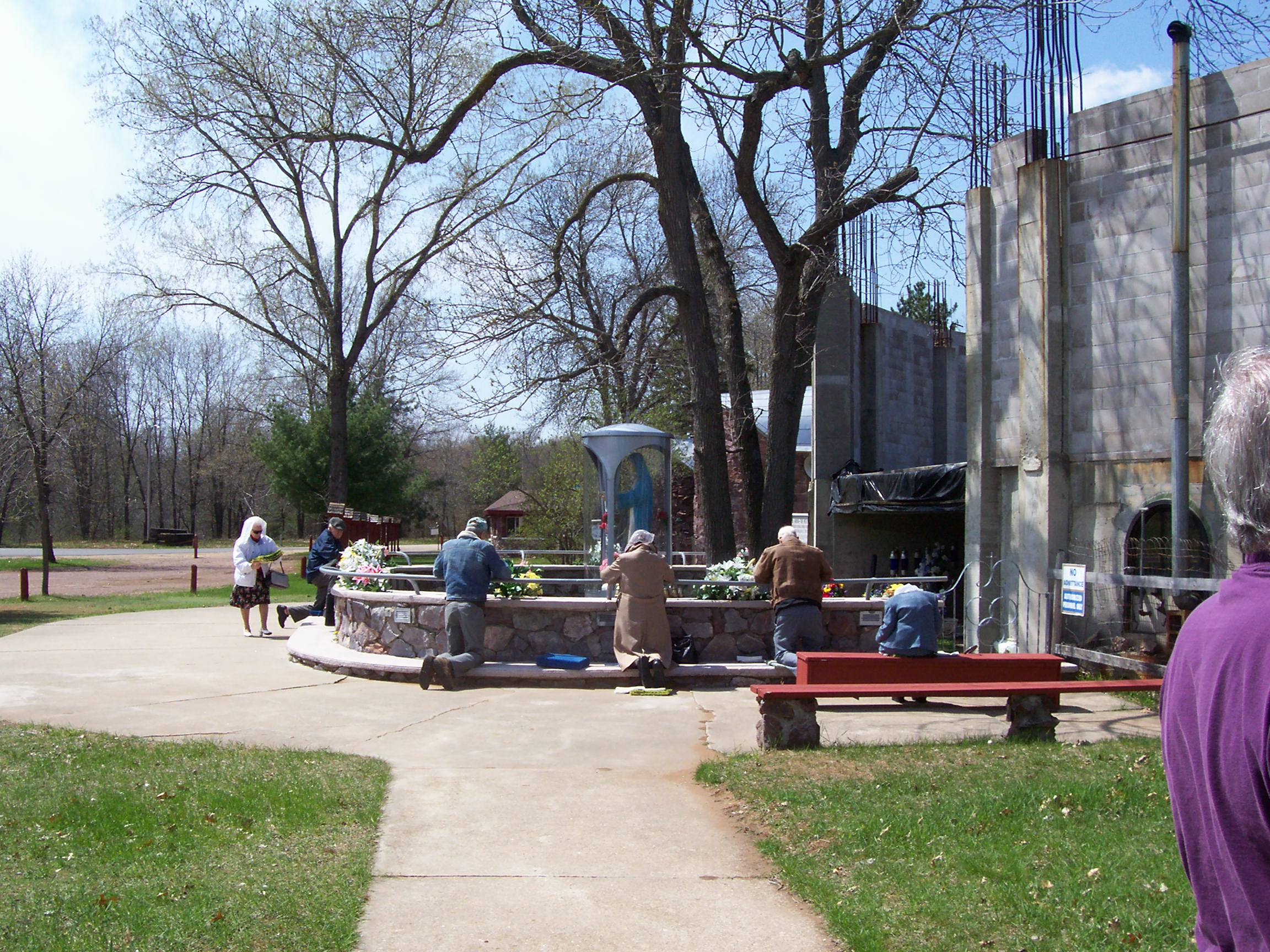
People praying at the Necedah Shrine

Statues of George Washington, Jesus, and Abraham Lincoln on the shrine grounds

Necedah Shrine, officially known as the Queen of the Holy Rosary, Mediatrix of Peace Shrine, is a Marian shrine located in Necedah, Wisconsin. On November 12, 1949, creator of the shrine, Mary Ann Van Hoof (1909–1984) reported receiving a vision from the Virgin Mary. She claimed that in subsequent visions she was told to "bring the truth to people" through prayer and the Rosary. Van Hoof later created a small shrine at where she supposedly saw the Virgin Mary, which grew into the modern-day Necedah Shrine. The Roman Catholic Church investigated and found the reported visions and other phenomena faked, and when Van Hoof and her followers refused to desist in their worship at the Necedah Shrine, put them under interdict. Van Hoof and the shrine's followers then left the Roman Catholic Church and joined themselves to the Old Catholic movement.

The shrine has accumulated various controversies over time, including a shrine-related shooting, various allegations of pedophilia, an alleged connection to a failed recall election in Wisconsin and inadequate medical practices at a shrine-ran orphanage.

== Mary Ann Van Hoof ==
Mary Ann Van Hoof was born in 1909 and raised in Philadelphia, where she was baptized as a Catholic but not raised in the church. Her mother was a spiritualist. Van Hoof moved to Wisconsin at age 21 to pursue a job as a housekeeper, and married her employer, Godfred "Fred" Van Hoof, four months later. The two worked as sharecroppers.

== History ==
=== Initial apparitions ===
Mary Ann Van Hoof's first vision reportedly occurred at night on November 12, 1949, when she saw a figure wearing a veil approaching her. She was frightened, and did not tell anyone about the experience for a month afterward. Van Hoof's husband Godfred, a Catholic, was the first to suggest that the figure was the Virgin Mary. On April 7, 1950 (Good Friday), Van Hoof claimed to have seen the crucifix on her wall glow and heard the voice of the Virgin Mary tell her that "while her cross was heavy to bear, the world faced a greater burden of sorrow unless she would pray." The voice also instructed her to ask the local parish priest to direct the congregation to pray the Rosary each evening; when she did this, then the Virgin Mary would appear again.

Her first public Marian apparition allegedly took place from May 28 (Pentecost) to 30th, 1950. On the 28th, Van Hoof saw the Virgin Mary in a blue mist near four ash trees in her yard. The Virgin said she would return the following two days as well as June 4 (Trinity Sunday), June 16 (Feast of the Sacred Heart), August 15 (Feast of the Assumption), and October 7th (Feast of the Rosary). The location of these apparitions became known as the "Sacred Spot". Local interest in the apparitions increased, and each one attracted more visitors to the Van Hoof farm. On June 16, over 1,500 people were present to hear Van Hoof dispense messages she claimed to receive from the Virgin Mary.

On August 15, 1950, an estimated 100,000 people visited the Van Hoof farm for the Feast of the Assumption. The mass pilgrimage on August 15 of 1950 was reported on in national papers including: The New York Times, Newsweek, Life and many Catholic newspapers. Van Hoof prayed at the statue of Our Lady of Fátima erected in the yard and spoke to the crowd, relaying the Virgin Mary's alleged messages. In the messages, Van Hoof exhorted the pilgrims to pray the Rosary and attend Mass, and warned that "the time has come that the destruction is right above us. More than three-thirds of the nations is now covered with the enemy of God. [...] The black clouds are coming over, not to Europe, Asia, Australia, Africa, but to America—South and North America. Alaska is the first stepping stone. Remember—the Pacific coast!" The anticipated apparition on October 7 attracted around 30,000 people. Numerous attendees reported seeing a "miracle of the sun", where the sun changed color, spun around, and swerved towards the earth. Other reports of miraculous healings and rosaries turning to gold galvanized belief in the apparitions.

Van Hoof reported that she was told in a vision that the most perfect way of offering Mass was the Tridentine Mass approved by Saint Pius V and the Council of Trent for the Latin Church. She was reportedly told that the Novus Ordo Mass, developed in the Vatican shortly after the Second Vatican Council, was a watered down version of the Tridentine Mass.

=== Diocesan investigations and condemnations ===
Bishop Treacy of La Crosse established an investigating committee for Van Hoof's claims in July 1950. In the weeks leading up to August 15, the diocese issued statements discouraging Catholics from attending the celebrations at Necedah. Treacy banned additional Masses from being said in Necedah, but lifted the ban on August 14 when it became apparent the number of people who would be in attendance. However, the diocese reiterated their officially skeptical position. In November 1950, Milwaukee archbishop Moses E. Kiley ordered the shrine's statue of Our Lady of Fátima and the Stations of the Cross be removed.

Beginning in Advent of 1950, Van Hoof claimed to spiritually experience the Stigmata on the Fridays, Saturdays, and Sundays of Advent and Lent. This was reportedly repeated in following years; starting with Advent of 1951, Van Hoof claimed she followed a liquid-only diet due to constant vomiting. To test Van Hoof's claims, Bishop Patrick Treacy had her hospitalized at the Marquette University Medical School for Holy Week of 1952. According to the investigating committee, tests at the hospital indicated that Van Hoof's salt levels were consistent with having eaten solid food prior. She also did not manifest signs of the Stigmata during her hospitalization. This part of the investigation was criticized as unfair by Van Hoof's followers, as well as a priest who had witnessed her sufferings.

Bishop Treacy issued a formal condemnation of the apparitions as non-supernatural in 1955, prohibiting public and private worship at the shrine. His successor, Bishop Freking, took a harder stance and reiterated the 1955 condemnation after he became bishop in 1964. In 1969 he established a new investigation, and published a new report condemning the shrine in 1970. Freking condemned the shrine again in 1971 and 1972, ordering them to stop all activity.

=== Growth and ideological development ===
Beginning in the summer of 1950, the president of the Necedah Chamber of Commerce Henry Swan led a group of local believers in distributing pamphlets and buying radio time to promote the Van Hoof apparitions.

Mary Ann Van Hoof's initial messages closely resembled those at Fátima and frequently referenced those apparitions as well as the recent Lipa apparitions in the Philippines, but progressively became more specific and put more emphasis on warning of threats to America. Her messages also became more explicitly McCarthyist, portraying Wisconsin Senator Joseph McCarthy as "a sort of American saint, and, later, as a martyr." By the mid-1950s, Van Hoof's messages began to promote conspiracy theories under the influence of Henry Swan. Swan believed that forces of Satan had infiltrated the United States, led by the "Grand Masters" and the "Learned Elders of Zion", who used Freemasonry and communism for their objective of creating a single world government. Van Hoof was also preoccupied with the activities of Russian submarines and missiles, which she claimed to personally witness the movements of via supernatural transportation to military bases.

=== Shrine-involved shooting ===
On February 25, 1974 a man named Henry Binwoski, a World War II veteran, who had been diagnosed with battle fatigue and shell shock, had a PTSD episode. He began to shoot into the woods outside of a nearby inn and threaten those inside with a rifle, saying, "he wants his brother Val" according to the wife of a local dentist, Betty Goetz. In a call with another local woman, Gert Schmelzle, Betty begged for her to contact someone to deal with the situation. The person suggested was Ray Pritzl, a man known as 'The Advocate' who was a leader in the Necedah Shrine and whose title was supposedly granted to him by the Virgin Mary. Henry continued, alleging that his brother, Val, was planning to sell their shared property to the shrine.

After being contacted, Ray Pritzl decided to send someone else to deal with the situation, specifically Tommy Huber, who was an epileptic known locally for being intelligent. When he tried to calm him down, Henry randomly shot at nearby objects, including windows and doors. According to a witness at the shooting who called Ray Pritzl for help, during this, Van Hoof told Ray Pritzl in the background of the call to not call the police, as it would jeopardize the shrine's reputation. Tommy was then injured after glass shards from a shattered window ricocheted and hit him in the face, and then was shot in the head by the rifle, which prompted the police to finally be called.

Evidence later surfaced that showed when the PTSD veteran's supply of PTSD medication ran out, two women affiliated with the shrine gave him herbal medicine as a replacement for his medicine, and allegedly said that the herbal medicine was more effective than the medicine prescribed to him.

=== Interdict ===
In May 1975, Bishop Freking placed Mary Ann Van Hoof and six of her closest followers under interdict, barring them from all of the sacraments except confession. Freking cited their refusal to obey prior orders to close the shrine and cease distributing Necedah Shrine-derived literature. In November, the parish priest of St. Francis' Church in Necedah asked followers of Van Hoof to stop attending Mass there and refused Communion to those who would not renounce the shrine.

=== Aftermath ===
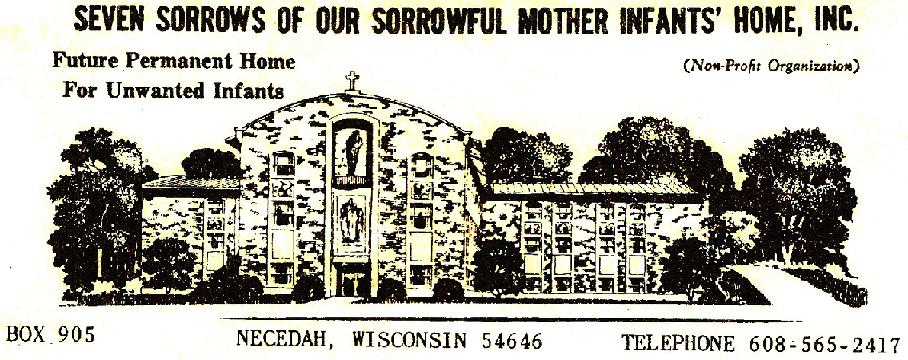
The logo of the Seven Sorrows orphanage

In May 1979, the shrine officially broke from the Roman Catholic Church and joined the Old Catholic movement. In the 1970s, the community ran an orphanage, named Seven Sorrows of Our Sorrowful Mother's Home for Unwanted Infants. In 1980, the home was accused of inadequate medical practices and pressuring mothers to give up their children, leading some, including Wisconsin governor Lee S. Dreyfus to call for an investigation.

Also in 1980, a pedophile named David Shott, who had left Maryland while under probation, and who was being searched for by police for an extradition back to Maryland, had arrived in Necedah, Wisconsin and became affiliated with the Necedah Shrine. He allegedly became an 'auxiliary archbishop' at the shrine. He was arrested by the police of Necedah but was later set free through a so-called "legal technicality".

In 1981, during a controversial recall election of the State Senator Thomas Harnisch, the shrine and the extremist organization Posse Comitatus were both implicated together for trying to oust Harnisch due to their alleged ulterior motives.

The movement lost much of its following in subsequent years. Van Hoof continued to report experiencing visions until her death in 1984. As of 2026, according to historian Sawyer McDonnell, the shrine has fewer than 100 remaining followers, and "Necedah has mostly become a normal town again". The shrine is now mostly seen by locals and the general public as a tourist attraction.

== Influence ==
Journalist Mark Garvey described the apparitions in Necedah as "the most historically significant apparition series" in the United States. The shrine has been influential upon a number of other similar Marian apparition movements, such as those in Conyers, Georgia, and the visions of Estela Ruiz in Arizona and Veronica Lueken in New York. Lueken was aware of Necedah prior to her alleged visions starting in 1970, and in the mid-1980s, Lueken was accused of plagiarism of Van Hoof's messages. The similarities and connection between the two have been noted by Michael W. Cuneo, Michael P. Carroll, and Joseph P. Laycock: both Lueken and Van Hoof were interested in Spiritualism and claimed to have received the Stigmata, both claimed to have received many visions over multiple decades, and the messages they proclaimed shared themes of communist threat to America, Russian world domination, and emphasis on the Rosary.

== Publishing ==
In 1954, Mary Ann Van Hoof directed two of her closest followers, Clara Hermans and Henry Swan, to compile accounts of their work at the Necedah Shrine. The following year, Swan began compiling Van Hoof's messages, apparitions, and accounts of spiritual sufferings. He published the four-volume work in 1959 under the title My Work With Necedah through the shrine's organization For My God and My Country, Inc.
