= Moturi =

Moturi is a Telugu surname.

- Moturi Hanumantha Rao, an Indian politician
- Moturi Udayam, an Indian politician and women's rights activist
- Moturi Satyanarayana, an Indian parliamentarian and Hindi activist
