= M. Hanumantha Rao =

M. Hanumantha Rao may refer to

- Madapati Hanumantha Rao, Indian politician
- Moturu Hanumantha Rao, Indian politician
- Mynampally Hanumanth Rao, Indian politician
