= Marian apparition of La Corona =

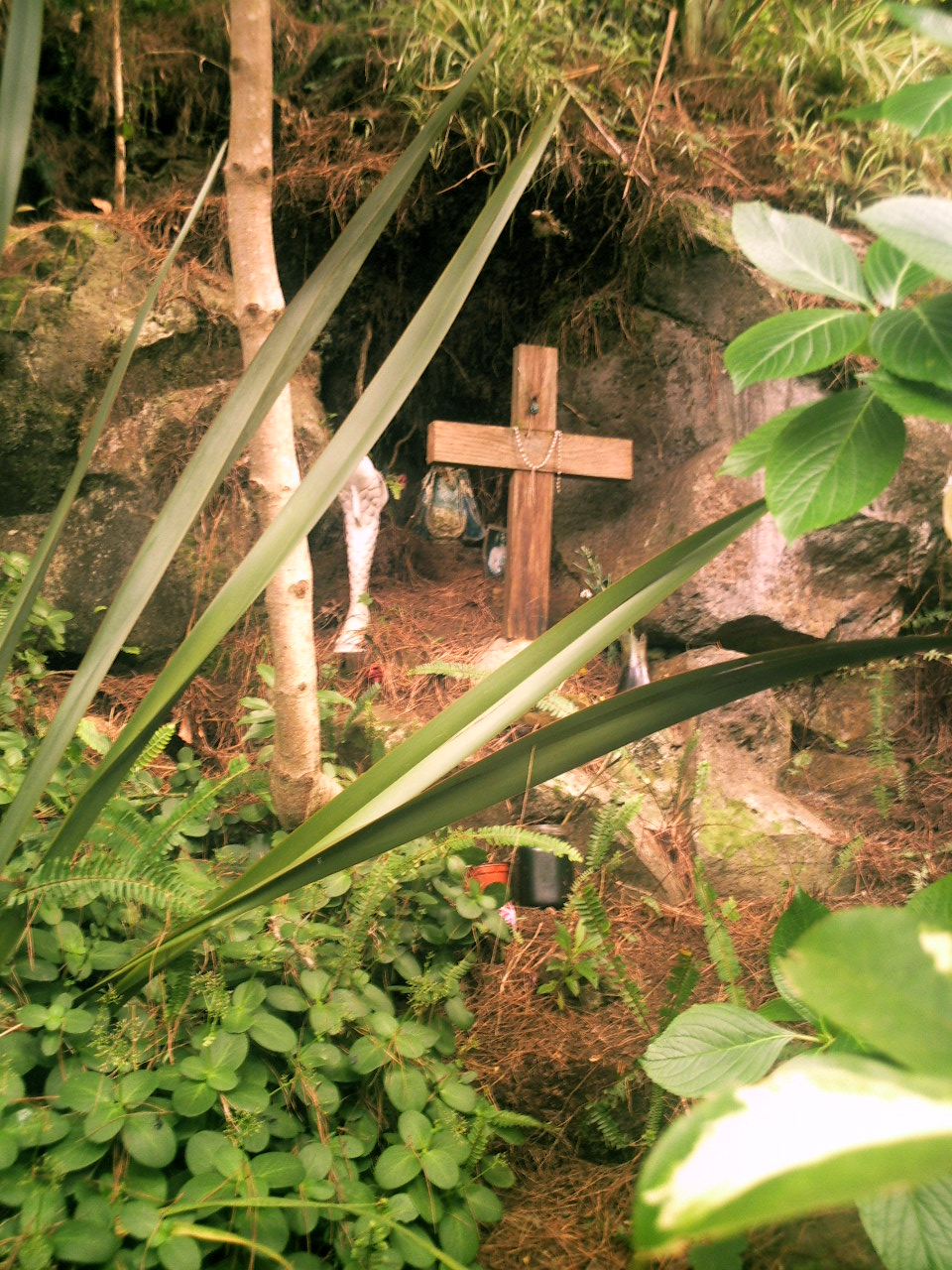
One of the altars located in the grottos next to the so-called "Fountain of Peter", where the alleged Marian apparition took place.

The so-called Marian apparition of La Corona refers to a sociological phenomenon that took place on the night of June 6-7, 1992, at a location known as Monte de La Corona (Mountain of Crown in English) in the municipality of Los Realejos, island of Tenerife (Canary Islands, Spain). Those present associated this event with a supposed Marian apparition, although it also contained elements of ufology.

== Background ==
The alleged clairvoyant was a Cuban woman named Justina Rodríguez, who called herself "Divina Swan Lorin". She claimed to be an extraterrestrial entity from the Andromeda Galaxy. According to her, this entity entered her body to carry out an evolutionary mission that would lead humanity into the fourth dimension by the year 2000. This mission was called "Project Pyramid". From this point on, she began offering hands-on healing therapies and adopted the name "Justina Divina".

At the beginning of 1992, she claimed to have received a message from extraterrestrial entities. According to this message, the Virgin Mary would appear in the early morning hours of June 6-7 of that year. The supposed apparition would take place at the so-called Fuente de Pedro (Fountain of Peter), a grotto-gallery from which water was once drawn on Monte de La Corona. This location would be "indicated" by the appearance of an arc of light, according to the clairvoyant's followers.

In the following months, the "message" was disseminated through media outlets and conferences, which focused particularly on world peace. This phenomenon occurred during a period of global crisis, amidst a widespread feeling of instability resulting from various conflicts, such as the Gulf War.

The Catholic Church consistently opposed the phenomenon, labeling it a "falsehood" and "superstition". The Diocese of Tenerife issued a statement denying the veracity of the phenomenon, which was read by priests in all parishes of the municipality of Los Realejos.

In March, several people reported the appearance of strange phenomena in the area. These included sightings of UFOs, balls of light, and "sun dances".

== The Events ==
On the afternoon of June 6, people from all over the island climbed to the site on Monte de La Corona, hoping for a miracle. Justina and her followers ascended, praying and dressed entirely in white.

At 3:00 a.m., witnesses reported seeing flashes of light, halos, and lightning. They also claimed to have seen a figure identified as the Virgin Mary. According to the visionary, the Virgin appeared in the form of various Marian advocations, such as Our Lady of Sorrows, Our Lady of Mount Carmel, and Our Lady of Candelaria, among others. Other witnesses also reported their own visions.

According to some accounts, a luminous mist emerged from the grotto or gallery, condensing to form a female figure less than a meter tall, suspended in the air with small luminous flashes around her. Another account mentions the appearance of "a small, golden figure, with the classic appearance of a Marian icon, but somewhat translucent. When people shone their flashlights or even spotlights in its direction, it didn't disappear, nor was it evident that it was something suspended by threads; rather, it dimmed, only to regain its clarity when the light sources were withdrawn in response to shouts".

The phenomenon drew more than 2,000 people, and various national and regional media outlets reported on the event. Testimonies of what happened that night are numerous and varied. The event is considered the only one of its kind to have occurred in the Canary Islands in recent times.

After the alleged apparitions, the visionary Justina settled in Miami, maintaining a low profile ever since, although she occasionally returns to Tenerife. Currently, a small altar stands at the site of the alleged apparition, which still attracts an unusual number of worshippers.

== Bibliography ==
- González, José Gregorio (2007). Grandes misterios del cristianismo. Ediciones Nowtilus. ISBN 9788497634724.
