= Inaudi =

Inaudi is a surname of Italian origin. Notable people with the surname include:

- Francesca Inaudi (born 1977), Italian actress
- Jacques Inaudi (1867–1950), Italian mathematician
- Nicolas Inaudi (born 1978), French cyclist

== See also ==
- Einaudi
