= 1988 Lubbock apparition of Mary =

1988 purported vision in Texas, US

1988 Lubbock Apparition of Mary
- Date: February – August, 1988
- Location: St. John Neumann Church in Lubbock, Texas; 33.574117°N 101.942012°W
- Type: Marian apparition
- Participants: 12,000 people

The 1988 Lubbock apparition of Mary was a Marian apparition that allegedly took place at St. John Neumann Church in Lubbock, Texas, between February and August, 1988.

== Description ==
The event began shortly after the parish priest, Joseph James, returned from a pilgrimage to Medjugorje. Beginning in February, parishioners began to report having experiences of Mary, including the smell of roses. One, Mary Constancio, claimed to have received instructions to spread the word of what they had experienced, and to gather more people. People began to come to Lubbock in greater numbers, and during the Feast of the Assumption, 12,000 people came to Lubbock hoping to observe the phenomenon. Late in the day some people reported unusual phenomena related to the appearance of the Sun, similar to the 1917 Miracle of the Sun.

The event was investigated by a team assembled by Bishop of Lubbock Michael J. Sheehan. As of 2008, the event was not recognized by the Catholic Church. In 2017, Monsignor James hinted there could be Vatican investigation into the claims.

== See also ==
- Lubbock Lights
- Visions of Jesus and Mary
