= Stanley Jaki =

Hungarian-American priest-theologian and theoretical physicist (1924–2009)

The Reverend Doctor Stanley Jaki OSB
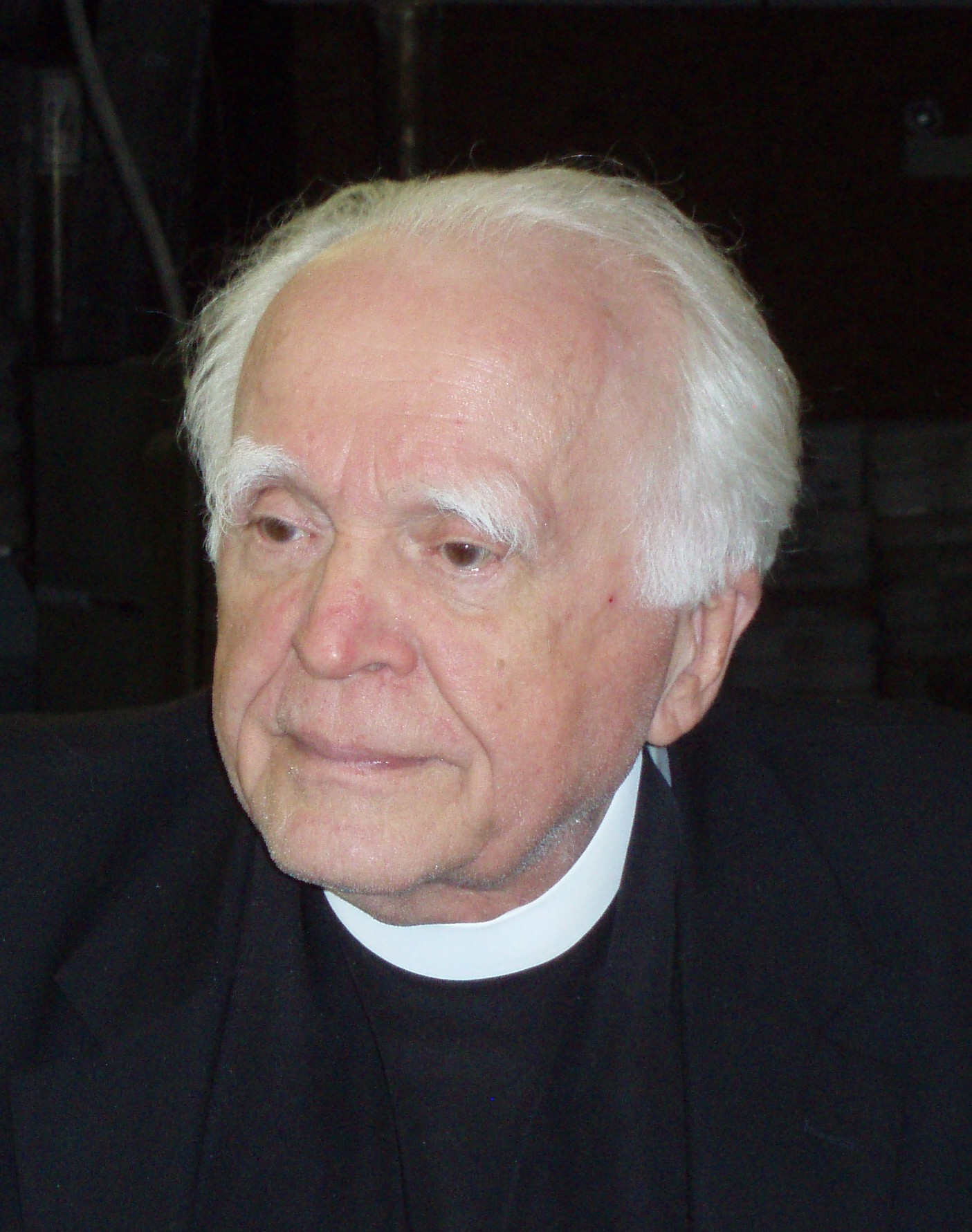
- Born: Stanley L. Jaki; 17 August 1924; Győr, Hungary
- Died: 7 April 2009 (aged 84); Madrid, Spain
- Education: Pontifical Athenaeum of Saint Anselm (STD, 1950); Fordham University (PhD, 1957)
- Awards: Templeton Prize (1987)
- Scientific career
- Fields: Physics, Philosophy of Science
- Workplaces: Seton Hall University; Pontifical Atheneum of St. Anselm; Stanford University, UC Berkeley, Princeton University and Institute for Advanced Study, Princeton
- Doctoral advisor: Victor Hess

Stanley L. Jaki OSB (Jáki Szaniszló László; 17 August 1924 – 7 April 2009) was a Hungarian-born priest of the Benedictine order. From 1975 until his death, he was Distinguished University Professor at Seton Hall University, in South Orange, New Jersey.

He held doctorates in theology and in physics and was a leading contributor to the philosophy of science and the history of science, particularly to their relationship to Christianity. In 2018, Jaki was named one of five Catholic scientists "that shaped our understanding of the world" by Aleteia; the other four are: Copernicus, Gregor Mendel, Giuseppe Mercalli and Georges Lemaître.

== Studies ==
After completing undergraduate training in philosophy, theology and mathematics, Jaki did graduate work in theology and physics and gained doctorates in theology from the Pontifical Atheneum of St. Anselm in Rome (1950) and in physics from Fordham University (1958), where he studied under the Nobel laureate Victor Hess, the co-discoverer of cosmic rays. He also did post-doctoral research in Philosophy of Science at Stanford University, UC Berkeley, Princeton University and Institute for Advanced Study, Princeton.

== Research ==
Jaki authored more than two dozen books on the relation between modern science and Christianity. He was Fremantle Lecturer at Balliol College, Oxford (1977), Hoyt Fellow at Yale University (1980) and Farmington Institute Lecturer at Oxford University (1988–1989). He was the Gifford Lecturer at Edinburgh University in 1974–1975 and 1975–1976. In 1987, he was awarded the Templeton Prize for furthering understanding of science and religion.

He was among the first to claim that Gödel's incompleteness theorem is relevant for theories of everything (TOE) in theoretical physics. Gödel's theorem states that any theory that includes certain basic facts of number theory and is computably enumerable will be either incomplete or inconsistent. Since any 'theory of everything' must be consistent, it also must be incomplete.

It is on the ultimate success of such a quest [for a TOE] that Gödel's theorem casts the shadow of judicious doubt. It seems on the strength of Gödel's theorem that the ultimate foundations of the bold symbolic constructions of mathematical physics will remain embedded forever in that deeper level of thinking characterized both by the wisdom and by the haziness of analogies and intuitions. For the speculative physicist this implies that there are limits to the precision of certainty, that even in the pure thinking of theoretical physics there is a boundary present, as in all other fields of speculations.

— Jaki, S.L., The Relevance of Physics, 1966. Chicago Press. p. 129.

== Death ==
Jaki died in Madrid following a heart attack. He was in Spain visiting friends, on his way back to the United States after delivering lectures in Rome, for the Master in Faith and Science of the Pontifical Athenaeum Regina Apostolorum.

== Bibliography ==
- Jaki, Stanley L., O.S.B. (1957). Les tendances nouvelles de l'ecclesiologie. Bibliotheca academiæ catholicæ hungaricæ: Sectio philosophico-theologica. Roma: Herder.
- 1966. The Relevance of Physics. University of Chicago Press.
- 1969. Brain, Mind and Computers. Herder & Herder.
- 1969. The Paradox of Olbers' Paradox. Herder & Herder.
- 1973. The Milky Way: an Elusive Road for Science. New York: Science History Publications.
- 1974. Science and Creation: From Eternal Cycles to an Oscillating Universe. Edinburgh: Scottish Academic Press.
- 1978. Planets and Planetarians. A History of Theories of the Origin of Planetary Systems. John Wiley & Edinburgh: Scottish Academic Press.
- 1978. The Road of Science and the Ways to God. Univ. of Chicago Press, and Edinburgh: Scottish Academic Press. ISBN 0-226-39145-0
- 1978. The Origin of Science and the Science of its Origins. Scottish Academic Press.
- 1980. Cosmos and Creator. Scottish Academic Press. ISBN 0-7073-0285-4
- 1983. Angels, Apes and Men. La Salle IL: Sherwood, Sugden & Co. ISBN 0-89385-017-9
- 1984. Uneasy Genius. The Life and Work of Pierre Duhem. The Hague/Boston: Martinus Nijhoff Publishers.
- 1986. Chesterton, a Seer of Science. University of Illinois Press.
- 1986. Lord Gifford and His Lectures. A Centenary Retrospective. Edinburgh: Scottish Academis Press, and Macon, GA.: Mercer University Press.
- 1986. Chance or Reality and Other Essays. Lanham, MD: University Press of America & Intercollegiate Studies Institute.
- 1987. The Keys of the Kingdom: A Tool's Witness to Truth. Chicago, IL: Franciscan Herald Press. ISBN 978-0819908988
- 1988. The Absolute Beneath the Relative and Other Essays. Lanham, MD: University Press of America & Intercollegiate Studies Institute.
- 2000 (1988). The Savior of Science. Wm. B. Eerdmans Publishing Company; Grand Rapids. ISBN 0-8028-4772-2
- 1989. Miracles and Physics. Front Royal. VA.: Christendom Press. ISBN 0-931888-70-0
- 1989. God and the Cosmologists. Regnery Gateway Inc.; Edinburgh: Scottish Academic Press.
  - The Purpose of it All
- 1990. The Only Chaos and Other Essays. Lanham MD: University Press of America & Intercollegiate Studies Institute.
- 1991. Scientist and Catholic, An Essay on Pierre Duhem. Front Royal VA: Christendom Press.
- 1994. Patterns or Principals and Other Essays. ISBN 978-1882926091.
- 1998 (1992) Genesis 1 Through the Ages. Edinburgh: Scottish Academic Press.
- 1996. Bible And Science. Front Royal, VA: Christendom Press. ISBN 0-931888-63-8
- 1999. God and the Sun at Fatima. Royal Oak, MI: Real View Books. OCLC 42267032
- 2000. The Limits of a Limitless Science and Other Essays. Intercollegiate Studies Institute. ISBN 1-882926-46-3
- 2000. Christ and science. Real View Books.
- 2001. Praying the Psalms, A Commentary, Wm. B. Eerdmans Publishing Company: Grand Rapids, ISBN 978-0802847713
- 2002. A Mind's Matter: An Intellectual Autobiography. Wm. B. Eerdmans Publishing Company: Grand Rapids. ISBN 0-8028-3960-6
- 2004. And On This Rock: Witness Of One Land & Two Covenants. Front Royal, VA: Christendom Press. ISBN 0-931888-68-9
- 2006. Archipelago Church. Port Huron, MI: Real View Books. ISBN 978-0-9790577-0-0
- 2008. Hail Mary, full of grace: A Commentary. New Hope, KY: Real View Books. ISBN 978-1-892539-06-9
- Jaki, Stanley L., O.S.B. (2021). New Trends in Ecclesiology. Caterino Tommaso, T.O.P. (trans.). New Hope, Ky.: Real View Books. ISBN 978-1-892539-25-0. (PDF, EPUB)
- 2024. Christ and Science and Other Essays. Asociación Española Ciencia y Cultura. ISBN 979-83-25544-59-0

== See also ==
- List of Christian thinkers in science
- List of Roman Catholic scientist-clerics
