= Venantius of Berri =

Venantius of Berri was a fifth century Saint and abbot.

He was born in Berri and joined the order of Martin of Tours and was elected abbot. His life was written by Gregory of Tours. His feast day was 13 October.
