= Marian apparitions at Conyers =

Marian apparitions that occurred in Conyers, Georgia

The Marian Apparitions at Conyers, in the U.S. state of Georgia, are a series of reported visions of the Virgin Mary experienced by Nancy Fowler. These apparitions gained significant attention from both the Roman Catholic community and the general public from the late 1980s through the 1990s.

== Background ==
Nancy Fowler, a housewife in Conyers, Georgia began reporting religious visions of Jesus in 1988. In 1990, her claims evolved to include apparitions of Mary, the mother of Jesus. These apparitions were accompanied by messages from the Virgin Mary which primarily emphasized themes of repentance, prayer, and conversion. Fowler's reports quickly attracted a following, with individuals from various parts of the world visiting her farm in Conyers to witness the apparitions and hear the messages. This influx of visitors marked a significant change in the character of the area, turning it into a site of religious interest.

In 1990, Fowler's reports of apparitions took on a new dimension as she claimed to begin receiving regular visits from the Virgin Mary. From 1990 until 1994, she reported that these apparitions occurred monthly, specifically on the 13th of each month. During this period, Fowler stated that she received consistent messages during each visitation. Following May 1994, there was a notable shift in the pattern of these reported apparitions. Fowler claimed that the monthly messages ceased, and instead, she began receiving an annual message on October 13th. This date is historically significant in the context of Marian apparitions, aligning with the anniversary of the "Miracle of the Sun" during the Fatima apparitions. This annual pattern of messages continued until 1998.

== Public response ==
The apparitions at Conyers became a phenomenon, drawing thousands of pilgrims, especially on the 13th of each month, a day Fowler indicated as significant for the apparitions. The gatherings were marked by mass prayers, testimonies, and a sense of community among attendees. People of diverse backgrounds shared experiences of spiritual renewal and reported miracles and healings.

== Position of the Catholic Church ==
The Catholic Church maintains a cautious stance towards the Conyers apparitions. While the Church has not officially endorsed the apparitions, it also does not condemn them outright. Archbishop James Patterson Lyke, O.F.M., who was Archbishop of Atlanta during the time of the apparitions, forbade priests from leading or initiating pilgrimages to Conyers. In 1994, Lyke's successor, Archbishop John Francis Donoghue, reiterated the directives to priests concerning pilgrimages to Conyers. Archbishop Donoghue was more open to the events however. In a June 12, 1994 article in the Atlanta Journal Constitution, he said of the Conyers apparitions, “People are praying. People are coming back to church who hadn’t been in church for a long time. People’s faith is restored. Conversions are taking place.” Portions of the Blessed Mother’s final message to Nancy were even published in the Atlanta Archdiocese newspaper, the Georgia Bulletin.

== Scientific testing ==
Numerous people visiting the site - including journalists - claimed to experience miracles, most often a mystical scent of roses.

Another aspect of the apparitions reported in Conyers was the claim that some objects, particularly rosaries, turned to gold during these events. A metallurgical analysis was conducted on one such rosary purported to have transformed during an apparition to test these claims. The results of the metallurgical testing were conclusive. Despite claims of the rosary turning gold, the analysis revealed no presence of gold in the composition of the rosary. It was found to be made of its original materials, with no alteration in its chemical or physical structure.

Another claim related to the Conyers apparitions was that the statue of the Virgin Mary exhibited signs of life, specifically a heartbeat on June 13, 1993. Joe Nickell, a senior research fellow for the Committee of Skeptical Inquiry later examined the statue using a stethoscope to verify this claim. The examination aimed to determine if there was any audible evidence supporting the claim that the statue had a heartbeat. Nickell concluded that there was no heartbeat detectable in the statue during his visit.
