= Jacques Inaudi =

Italian calculating prodigy

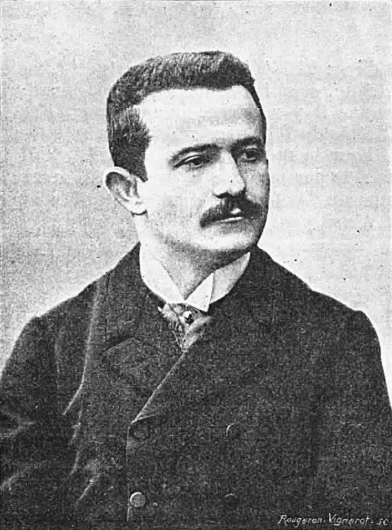
Giacomo Inaudi

Giacomo Inaudi (13 October 1867 – 25 November 1950), also known as Jacques Inaudi in France, was an Italian calculating prodigy.

He was born in Roccabruna, Piedmont, Italy. As a child he was a shepherd but showed aptitude for mental calculation. Inaudi's abilities attracted the interest of showmen and he toured around the world.

French scientists like Jean-Martin Charcot investigated his abilities, French astronomer Camille Flammarion praised him in strong terms, and Alfred Binet wrote a book on him. Inaudi would repeat the numbers he was given before he began his mental calculations.

Inaudi was referred to by the Nobel-prize-winning immunologist, Élie Metchnikoff (Ilya Ilyich Mechnikov), in his book The Nature of Man: Studies in Optimistic Philosophy (1905). Metchnikoff regarded Inaudi as an example of a mutation, in the sense announced by the Dutch botanist Hugo de Vries (Die Mutationstheorie, Vol. 1, Leipzig, 1901), i.e., a sudden leap to a distinct new type that might be regarded as a new species. Metchnikoff argued that this kind of abrupt leap in evolution might explain how humans had emerged from apes and that Inaudi was proof that such a mutation was possible.

== Biography ==
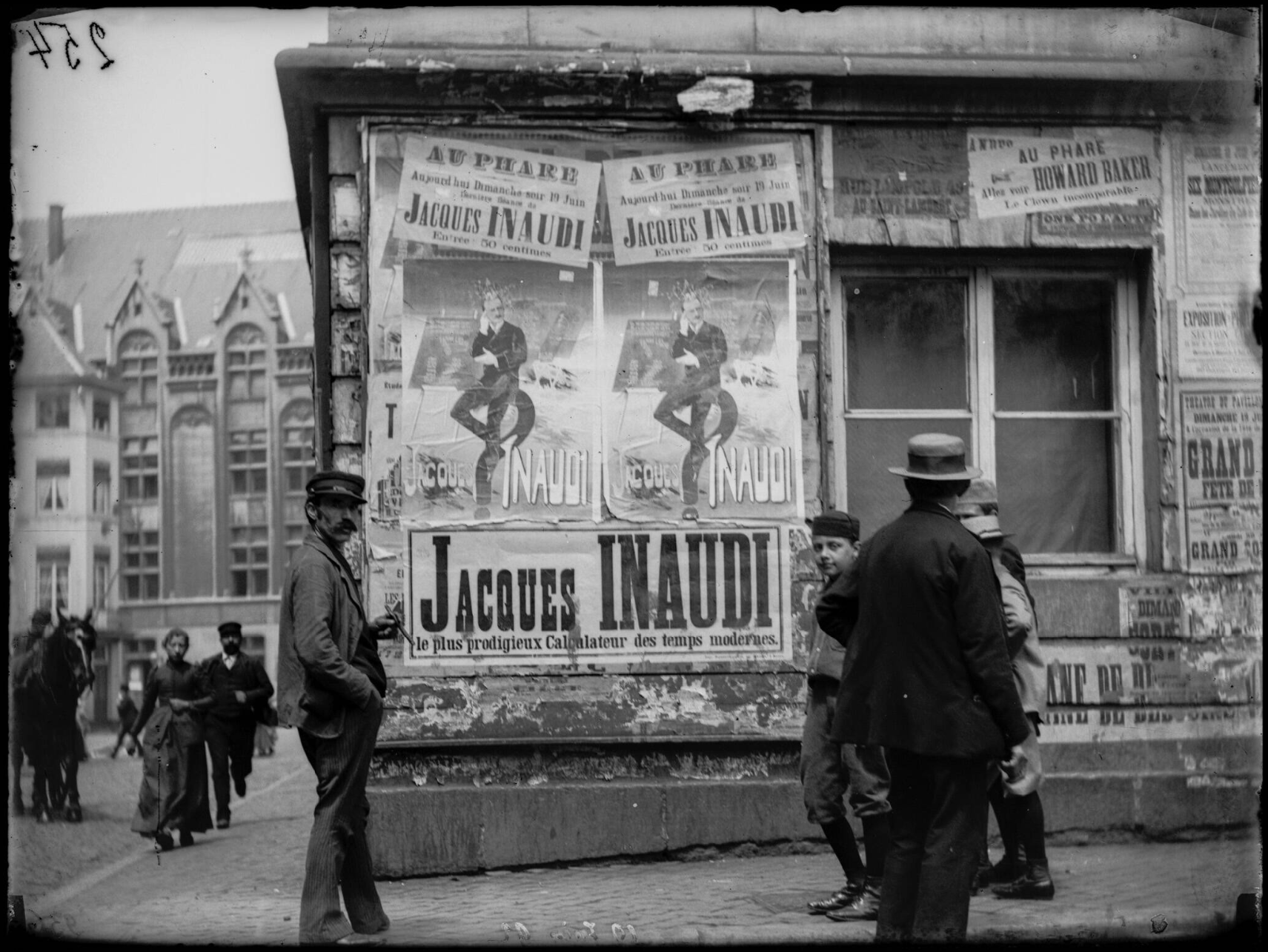
Poster for the show Jacques Inaudi, the most prodigious calculator of modern times in Liège, Belgium, photo by Jules Martiny (1892).

Giacomo Inaudi was perhaps the most famous mental calculator prodigy in history. Born very poor, as a child he was initiated into his father's trade, shepherding. But he soon showed aptitude for mental calculation and was taken to Marseille where, at the age of 12, he met Bénédit Jules Dombey, a sales representative, who was to become his impresario and whose daughter he married. The latter would guide him around the world in a series of performances as well as meetings with the scientific community. He was, among other things, introduced to the Académie Française, which commissioned Jean-Martin Charcot and Alfred Binet to thoroughly examine Inaudi's abilities. In particular, Binet delved into the matter, making it the subject of several publications. Other French scientists took an interest in his abilities: some, such as Camille Flammarion, enthusiastically; others, especially mathematicians, emphasized the fact that Inaudi's methods were based mainly on his personal talents (such as prodigious memory) or "tricks," and therefore could not be proposed for widespread use. Among his abilities, he could add or subtract numbers of even 20 digits or more together, or extract square and cube roots, in a matter of minutes; and he could readily indicate the day of the week of any date from the 17th century onward.

Inaudi died on 25 November 1950 at his "modest villa" in Champigny-sur-Marne, France.

== See also ==
- Serge Nicolas & Alessandro Guida, Charcot and the Mental Calculator Jacques Inaudi, in The European Yearbook of the History of Psychology 1 (2015), p. 107-138
- Burman, J. T.; Guida, A.; Nicolas, S. (2015), "Hearing the inaudible experimental subject: Echoes of Inaudi, Binet's calculating prodigy.", History of Psychology, 18 (1): 47–68, doi:10.1037/a0038448, PMID 25664885
- Endersby, Jim (September 2013), "Mutant Utopias: Evening Primroses and Imagined Futures in Early Twentieth-Century America" (PDF), Isis, 104 (3): 471–503, doi:10.1086/673270, JSTOR 10.1086/673270, PMID 24341261, S2CID 12125667
