= Moturu Udayam =

- Born: October 13, 1924; Turumella, Guntur district, India
- Died: March 31, 2002 (aged 77); Vijayawada, Andhra Pradesh, India
- Occupations: Politician, women's rights activist
- Known for: Leadership in women's movements; cultural activism
- Spouse: Moturu Hanumantha Rao

Moturu Udayam (13 October 1924 – 31 March 2002) was an Indian politician and women's rights activist. She was the General Secretary of the Andhra Pradesh Mahila Sangham for eighteen years, and then the honorary president of the organisation between 1992 and 2001. She was also Vice President of the All India Democratic Women's Association, to which the APMS is affiliated, between 1981 and 2001.

Udayam was born in Turumella village, Guntur district. She came from a family of communist sympathizers in Turumella village. She was married to the communist leader Moturu Hanumantha Rao. Along with her husband, she lived underground during the periods of 1940–1945 and 1949–1951. She was the main artist in the first all-female Burrakatha cultural group, a vehicle for anti-fascist campaign activities. She was also known in Andhra Pradesh as the first woman to ride a bicycle in the state.

In the early 1960s she campaigned for the release of detained communists. When the Communist Party of India was split in 1964, she sided with the Communist Party of India (Marxist). With Manikonda Suryavathi and Mallu Swarajyam she then worked to rebuild the women's movement in the state. During the Emergency, she again went underground to escape repression. She organised karate classes for women, and in 1988 she visited China at the invitation of a Chinese women's organisation. She died in Vijayawada on 31 March 2002 and was survived by two daughters.

== Legacy ==
After her death, the Moturu Udayam Trust was set up in her memory. Mallu Swarajyam, who had built up the APMS alongside Udayam, was its managing trustee.

== Bibliography ==
Udayam's life story is detailed, along with testimonies from eleven other women activists, in the book Breaking Barriers, Stories of Twelve Women, released at the seventh national conference of the AIDWA in Bhubaneswar in November 2004.

Udayam wrote Mahilala badhamaya jivita gunde cappullu: Adugaduguna vyathalu-visada gathalu (1997), a book in Telugu on the condition of women in India. She also compiled two collections published in Vijayawada in 1998, Mahilalapai maranahomam antamayyedeppudu? on crimes against women and Svatantryam vacci 50 vasantalu gadicina ativalaku agacatle migilayi. Her other publications include Kangrasupalana pratibimbame mahilala ki adhogati and Mahilalaku himsala nundi vimukti eppudu?.
