= Miracle of the Sun =

Purported miracle in 1917

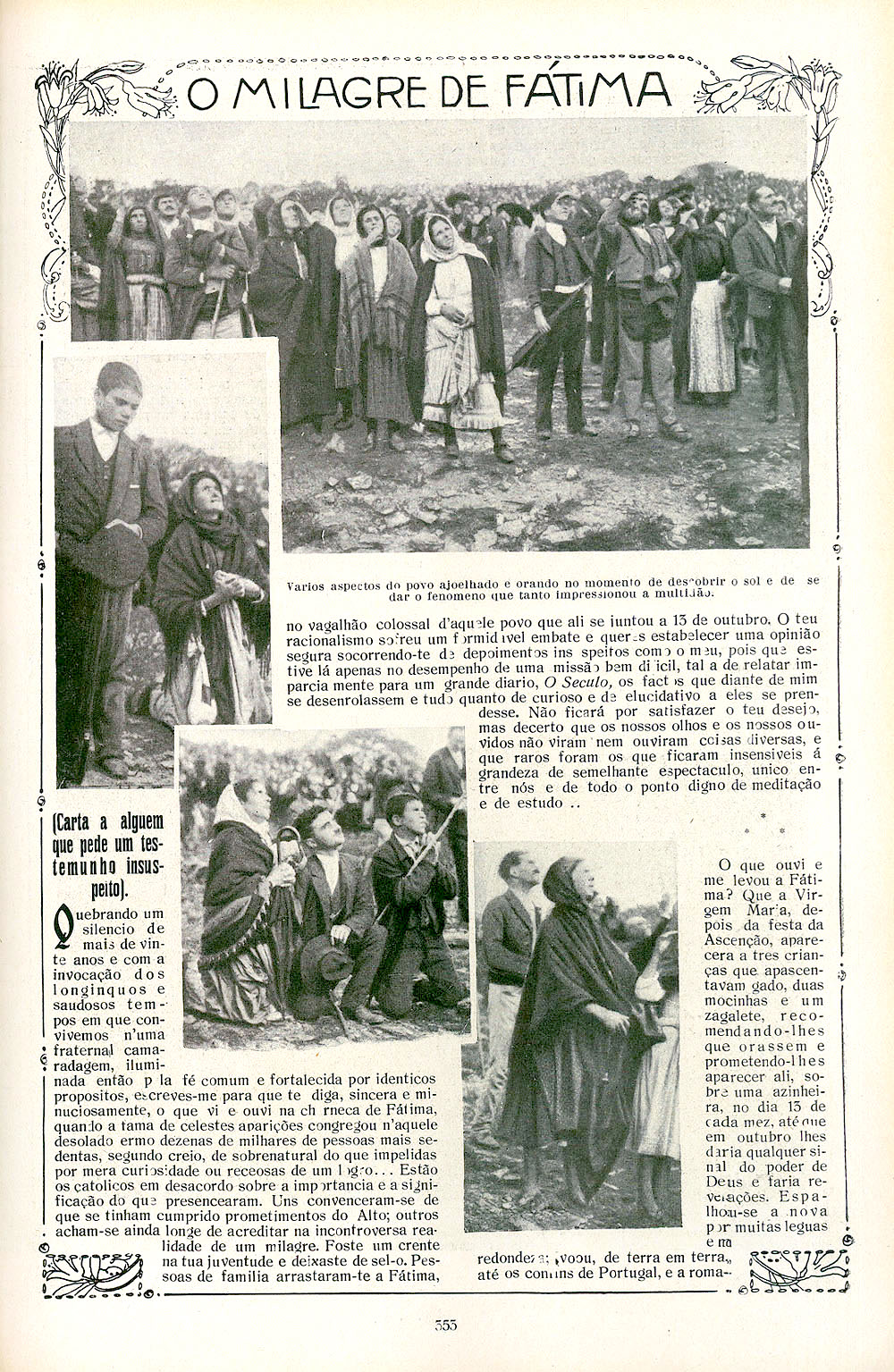
Page from Ilustração Portuguesa, 29 October 1917, showing the people looking at the Sun during the Fátima apparitions attributed to the Virgin Mary

The Miracle of the Sun (Portuguese: Milagre do Sol), also known as the Miracle of Fátima, is a series of events reported to have occurred miraculously on 13 October 1917, attended by a large crowd in the tens of thousands who had gathered in Fátima, Portugal, in response to a prophecy made by three shepherd children, Lúcia Santos and Francisco and Jacinta Marto. The prophecy was that the Virgin Mary (referred to as Our Lady of Fátima) would appear and perform miracles on that date. Newspapers published testimony from witnesses who said that they had seen extraordinary solar activity, such as the Sun appearing to "dance" or zig-zag in the sky, advance towards the Earth, or emit multicolored light and radiant colors. According to these reports, the event lasted approximately ten minutes.

The local bishop opened a canonical investigation of the event in November 1917, to review witness accounts and assess whether the alleged private revelations from Mary were compatible with Catholic theology. The local priest conducting the investigation was particularly convinced by the concurring testimony of extraordinary solar phenomena from secular reporters, government officials, and other skeptics in attendance. Bishop José da Silva declared the miracle "worthy of belief" on 13 October 1930, permitting "officially the cult of Our Lady of Fátima" within the Catholic Church.

At a gathering on 13 October 1951 at Fátima, the papal legate, Cardinal Federico Tedeschini, told the million people attending that on 30 October, 31 October, 1 November, and 8 November 1950, Pope Pius XII himself witnessed the miracle of the Sun from the Vatican gardens. The early and enduring interest in the miracle and related prophecies has had a significant impact on the devotional practices of many Catholics.

There has been much analysis of the event from critical sociological and scientific perspectives. According to critics, the eyewitness testimony was actually a collection of inconsistent and contradictory accounts. Proposed alternative explanations include witnesses being deceived by their senses due to prolonged staring at the Sun and then seeing something unusual as expected.

== Background ==
In the spring of 1916, three Catholic shepherd children near Fátima reported visions of an angel. Beginning in May 1917, they also experienced apparitions of the Virgin Mary, whom they called the Lady of the Rosary. The children claimed the Lady prophesied that prayer would bring an end to the Great War, and that on 13 October that year, she would reveal her identity and perform a miracle "so that all may believe."

In previous apparitions the three children also reported receiving prophetic messages from Virgin Mary, which would be known as the Three Secrets of Fátima. The first two parts were written down by Lúcia in 1941, while the third, written in 1944, was publicly disclosed by the Vatican in 2000, accompanied by an official theological commentary.

Newspapers reported the prophecies, and many pilgrims began visiting the area. The children's accounts were deeply controversial, drawing intense criticism from both local secular and religious authorities. A provisional administrator briefly took the children into custody, believing the prophecies were politically motivated in opposition to the officially secular First Portuguese Republic established in 1910.

== The event ==
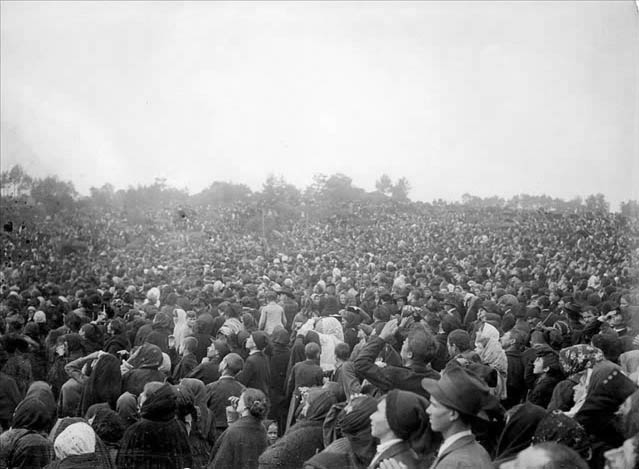
The crowd at Cova da Iria looking towards the Sun on 13 October 1917

Various claims have been made regarding the events that transpired. Many witnesses reported that after a period of rain, the dark clouds parted, revealing the Sun as an opaque, spinning disc in the sky. It was described as being significantly duller than usual, casting multicolored lights across the landscape, the people, and the surrounding clouds. The Sun was then reported to have careened towards the earth before zig-zagging back to its normal position. Witnesses reported that their previously wet clothes became "suddenly and completely dry, as well as the wet and muddy ground that had been previously soaked because of the rain that had been falling". Not all witnesses reported seeing the Sun "dance". Some people only saw the radiant colors, while others claimed to see the Virgin Mary. A number of people saw nothing. According to some estimates, the total crowd of observers was made up of about 70,000 people, while other sources state that there were 50,000 witnesses.

Skeptic Brian Dunning commented on an image commonly mistaken for a photograph of the Sun taken at Fátima: "An old black and white photograph of the actual sun miracle event shows a lot of dark rain clouds behind some trees and the sun poking through. There is certainly nothing in the photograph that looks unusual, but of course a photograph is static. Whatever the crowd saw was not interesting enough to be noticeable in a photograph". The photograph, originally published in 1951 by L'Osservatore Romano was subsequently determined to have been taken approximately eight years later in a different Portugal town of a different solar phenomenon. The misattributed image, however, continues to circulate on the internet, but EWTN acknowledges it is not from the events of Fátima.

The three children (Lúcia dos Santos and her cousins Jacinta and Francisco Marto) who originally claimed to have seen Our Lady of Fátima also reported seeing a panorama of visions, including those of Jesus, Our Lady of Sorrows, Our Lady of Mount Carmel, and Saint Joseph blessing the people. In the fourth edition of her memoirs, written in 1941, Lúcia said that on the occasion of their third visit to the Cova da Iria, on 13 July 1917, she asked the Lady to tell them who she was, and to perform a miracle so that everyone would believe. The Lady told her that they should continue to come to the Cova each month until October, when the requested miracle would occur.

=== De Marchi accounts ===
Location of Fátima

Descriptions of the events reported at Fátima were collected by Father John De Marchi, an Italian Catholic priest and researcher. De Marchi spent seven years in Fátima, from 1943 to 1950, conducting research and interviewing the principals at length. In The Immaculate Heart (1952), De Marchi reported that, "[t]heir ranks (those present on 13 October) included believers and non-believers, pious old ladies and scoffing young men. Hundreds, from these mixed categories, have given formal testimony. Reports do vary; impressions are in minor details confused, but none to our knowledge has directly denied the visible prodigy of the sun."

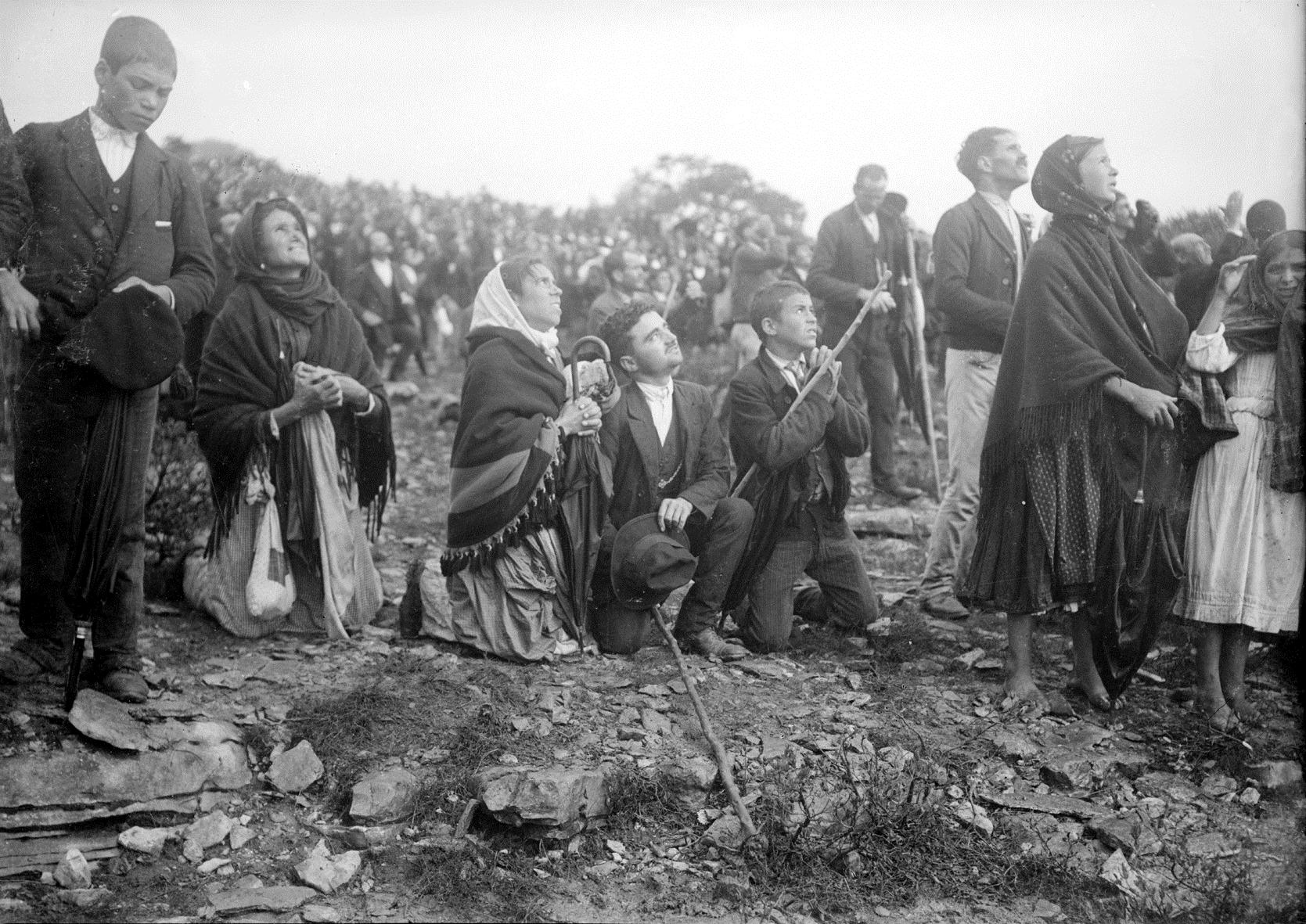
Part of the crowd looking at the Sun during the event

De Marchi authored several books on the subject, such as The True Story of Fátima. They include a number of witness descriptions:

- "The sun, at one moment surrounded with scarlet flame, at another aureoled in yellow and deep purple, seemed to be in an exceedingly swift and whirling movement, at times appearing to be loosened from the sky and to be approaching the earth, strongly radiating heat." — Domingos Pinto Coelho, writing for the Catholic newspaper Ordem.
- "The silver sun, enveloped in the same gauzy grey light, was seen to whirl and turn in the circle of broken clouds [...] The light turned a beautiful blue, as if it had come through the stained-glass windows of a cathedral, and spread itself over the people who knelt with outstretched hands [...] people wept and prayed with uncovered heads, in the presence of a miracle they had awaited. The seconds seemed like hours, so vivid were they." — Reporter for the Lisbon newspaper O Dia.
- "The sun's disc did not remain immobile. This was not the sparkling of a heavenly body, for it spun round on itself in a mad whirl when suddenly a clamor was heard from all the people. The sun, whirling, seemed to loosen itself from the firmament and advance threateningly upon the earth as if to crush us with its huge fiery weight. The sensation during those moments was terrible." — De Marchi attributes this description to Almeida Garrett, Professor of Natural Sciences at Coimbra University. Theologian Father Stanley L. Jaki wrote that it was actually given by José Almeida Garrett, a young lawyer, and is often mistakenly attributed to his father, a professor of natural sciences at the University of Coimbra, named Gonçalo de Almeida Garrett.
- "As if like a bolt from the blue, the clouds were wrenched apart, and the sun at its zenith appeared in all its splendor. It began to revolve vertiginously on its axis, like the most magnificent firewheel that could be imagined, taking on all the colors of the rainbow and sending forth multicolored flashes of light, producing the most astounding effect. This sublime and incomparable spectacle, which was repeated three distinct times, lasted for about ten minutes. The immense multitude, overcome by the evidence of such a tremendous prodigy, threw themselves on their knees." — Manuel Nunes Formigão, a professor at the seminary at Santarém, and a priest.
- "I feel incapable of describing what I saw. I looked fixedly at the sun, which seemed pale and did not hurt my eyes. Looking like a ball of snow, revolving on itself, it suddenly seemed to come down in a zig-zag, menacing the earth. Terrified, I ran and hid myself among the people, who were weeping and expecting the end of the world at any moment." — Rev. Joaquim Lourenço, describing his boyhood experience in Alburitel, 18 kilometres (11 mi) from Fátima.
- "On that day of October 13, 1917, without remembering the predictions of the children, I was enchanted by a remarkable spectacle in the sky of a kind I had never seen before. I saw it from this veranda" — Portuguese poet Afonso Lopes Vieira.

De Marchi also drew on the newspaper account written by Avelino de Almeida, a journalist sent by the newspaper O Século, who described in detail the reactions of the crowd.

== Catholic Church recognition ==
The event was declared of "supernatural character" by the Catholic Church in 1930. A shrine was built near the site in Fátima, which has been attended by thousands of faithful.

Pope Pius XII approved the "Fátima apparitions" in 1940. Four times during the week that he declared the dogma of the Assumption of Mary (33 years after the actual event said to have occurred in Fátima), Pope Pius XII claimed to have witnessed the same "Miracle of the Sun". At 4:00 p.m. on 30 October 1950, during a walk in the Vatican gardens, he arrived at the statue of Our Lady of Lourdes and began to see the miracle. He described himself in handwritten notes as "awestruck." He saw the same miracle on 31 October, again on 1 November (the date of the definition of the dogma) and then again on 8 November. He wrote that on other days at about the same time he tried to see if he could observe the Miracle of the Sun, but was unable to. He confided this information to a number of Vatican cardinals, to Sr. Pascalina Lehnert (the nun in charge of the papal apartments and his secretary) and finally to handwritten notes (discovered in 2008) that were later placed on display at the Vatican.

In March of 2017, Pope Francis approved the recognition of a miracle involving two of the children involved in the Fátima event, Francisco and Jacinta Marto, which paved the way for their canonization in May that same year. The third seer, Lúcia Santos, was given the title Servant of God the same year, and declared venerable on 22 June 2023 by Pope Francis.

== Believers' explanations ==
Within Catholicism, the event is seen as the fulfillment of a promise by Mary, mother of Jesus, to the shepherd children who said she appeared to them several times before 13 October 1917. According to the children's accounts, Mary, referred to as the "Lady of Fátima", promised them she would perform a miracle to show people they were telling the truth, and so caused the crowds to see the Sun make "incredible" movements in the sky. Catholics have regarded Mary as a powerful "miracle worker" for centuries, and this view has continued into the present. Various theologians and apologetic scientists have discussed the limits of scientific explanations for the event and proposed possible mechanisms through which divine intervention caused the solar phenomenon.

Fr Andrew Pinsent, research director of the Ian Ramsey Centre for Science and Religion at Oxford University, states that "a scientific perspective does not rule out miracles, and the event at Fátima is, in the view of many, particularly credible." He states that a usual prejudice involves a lack of understanding of the scope of scientific laws, which merely describe how natural systems behave isolated from free agents. Concluding that the event is "a public miracle of the most extraordinary kind and credibility", he sees the year of the event as connected to significant historical milestones that call for Fátima's message of repentance: Protestantism in 1517, Freemasonry in 1717 and atheistic Communism in 1917.

Theologian, physicist, and priest Stanley L. Jaki, concurs, concluding that by divine intervention, a coordinated interplay of natural meteorological events, an enhancement of air lens with ice crystals, was made to occur at the exact time predicted, and this is the essence of the miracle.

Jaki described the phenomenon:

...a sudden temperature inversion must have taken place. The cold and warm air masses could conceivably propel that rotating air lens in an elliptical orbit first toward the earth, and then push it up, as if it were a boomerang, back to its original position. Meanwhile, the ice crystals in it acted as so many means of refraction for the sun's rays... Only one observer, a lawyer, stated three decades later that the path of descent and ascent was elliptical with small circles superimposed on it. Such an observation would make eminent sense to anyone familiar with fluid dynamics or even with the workings of a boomerang. There is indeed plenty of scientific information on hand to approach the miracle of the sun scientifically... The carefully co-ordinated interplay of so many physical factors would by itself be a miracle, even if one does not wish to see anything more in what actually happened. Clearly, the "miracle" of the sun was not a mere meteorological phenomenon, however rare. Otherwise it would have been observed before and after, regardless of the presence of devout crowds or not. I merely claim, which I did in my other writings on miracles, that in producing miracles God often makes use of a natural substratum by greatly enhancing its physical components and their interactions.

According to Jaki, the faithful should believe that a miracle occurred at Fátima, and "those who stake their purpose in life on Christ as the greatest and incomparably miraculous fact of history", need to pay attention to facts that support miracles.

De Marchi believed related miraculous phenomena, such as the Sun's effect on standing water from heavy rains that immediately preceded the event, to be genuine. According to De Marchi, "...engineers that have studied the case reckoned that an incredible amount of energy would have been necessary to dry up those pools of water that had formed on the field in a few minutes as it was reported by witnesses." De Marchi wrote that the prediction of an unspecified "miracle", the abrupt beginning and end of the event, the varied religious backgrounds of the observers, the sheer numbers of people present, reports of sightings by people up to 18 kilometres (11 mi) away, and the lack of any known scientific causative factor make a mass hallucination or mass hysteria unlikely. De Marchi concludes that "given the indubitable reference to God, and the general context of the story, it seems that we must attribute to Him alone the most obvious and colossal miracle of history."

Leo Madigan, a former psychiatric nurse and local journalist at Fátima in the late 20th century, also dismisses suggestions from critics of mass hypnosis, and believes that astonishment, fear, exaltation and the spiritual nature of the phenomenon explain any inconsistency of witnesses descriptions. Madigan wrote that what people saw was "the reflection of the Lady's own light projected on the Sun itself".

Philippe Dalleur, a priest and faculty philosophy at the Pontificial University of the Holy Cross in Rome, studied photographs of the crowd taken by "O Século" photographer Judah Ruah. In his analysis of shadows, Dalleur states there are two light sources, one being the "silver sun" described by witnesses – but at the wrong elevation to be the Sun. He states that testimonies of witnesses who observed the phenomenon from a distance place the "silver sun" neither at the azimuth of the real Sun, nor at any fixed azimuth – but invariably at the direction of Fátima, concluding that the "silver sun" was a real luminous object over Fátima.

== Skeptical explanations ==
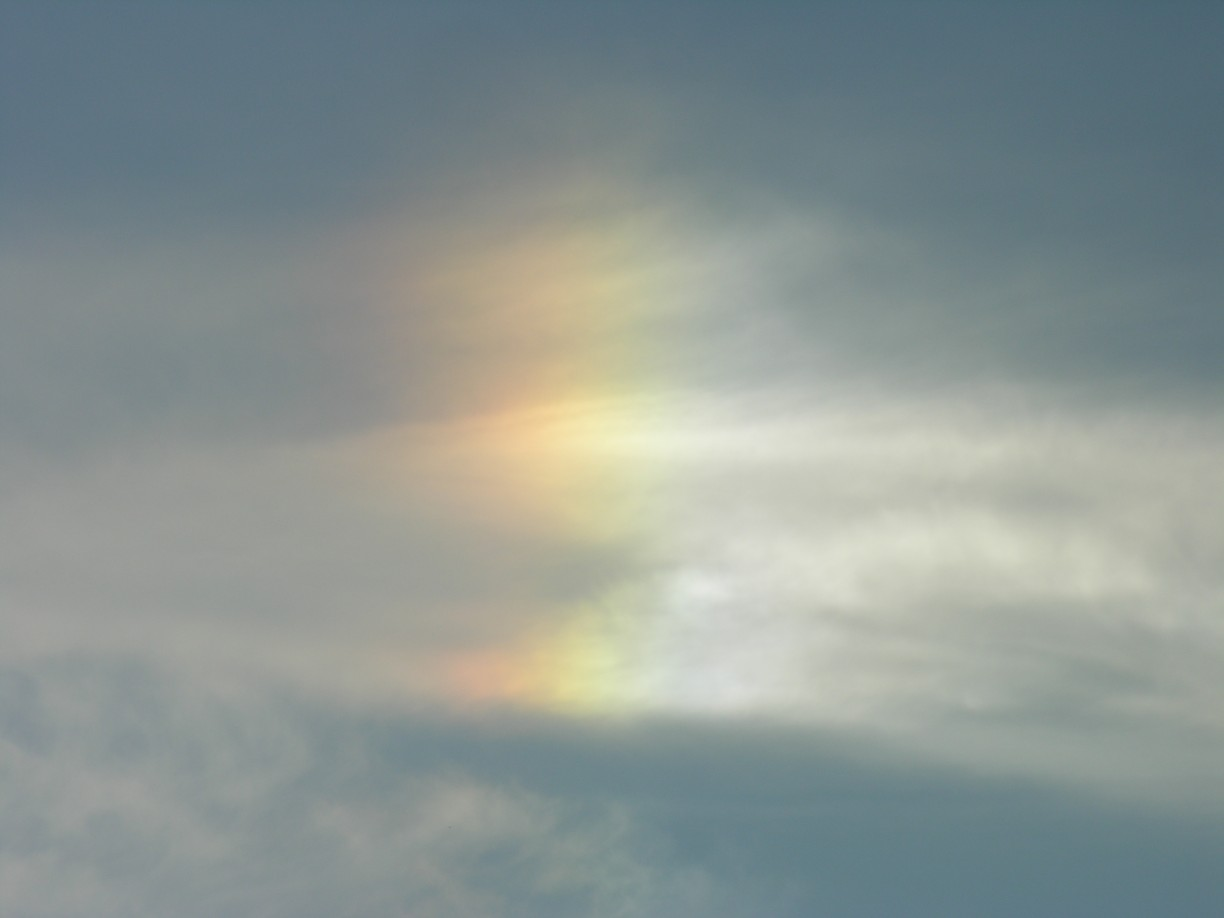
A parhelion in rainbow colors, photographed in 2005

Theologians, scientists and skeptics have responded to claims that conflict with established scientific knowledge regarding the behavior of the Sun. Science writer Benjamin Radford points out that "The sun did not really dance in the sky. We know this because, of course, everyone on Earth is under the same sun, and if the closest lying star to us suddenly began doing celestial gymnastics a few billion other people would surely have reported it". Radford wrote that psychological factors such as the power of suggestion and pareidolia can better explain the reported events. According to Radford, "No one suggests that those who reported seeing the Miracle of the Sun—or any other miracles at Fátima or elsewhere—are lying or hoaxing. Instead, they very likely experienced what they claimed to, though that experience took place mostly in their minds." Regarding claims of miraculous drying up of rain water, Radford wrote "it's not clear precisely what the weather was at the time of the miracle", and photography from the time of the event does not show that it had been raining as much or as long as was reported.

In The Evidence for Visions of the Virgin Mary (1983), former editor of the ASSAP's journal, Kevin McClure, whose intention in the book was to approach Marian apparition events in a sufficiently objective format for the reader "to make an independent decision as to what the visions may mean, and whence they may have come," wrote that "these events remain confusing and mystifying," and that the phenomenon is unique when compared to other abnormal events such as UFO sightings. He wrote that one is "not to say that a miraculous, stupendous, incomprehensible event did not occur" while looking for possible explanations. In reference to the accounts of the Miracle of the Sun phenomena, McClure writes that "the accounts of the miracle, of the dance of the sun', are simply not consistent”. McClure remarks that perception and memory becoming uncertain during an incomprehensible event is not surprising, but that the contradictions in the accounts must raise some doubts towards the objective nature of what was seen. While McClure is often misquoted in purportedly stating that he had never seen such a collection of contradictory accounts of a case in any of the research that he had done in the previous ten years, he was specifically referring to accounts of the alleged Marian apparitions that the three children witnessed, not the accounts of the Miracle of the Sun phenomena itself, when making such a claim.

According to professor of religion Lisa J. Schwebel, claims of the miracle present a number of difficulties. Schwebel states, "Not only did all those present not see the phenomenon, but also there are considerable inconsistencies among witnesses as to what they did see". Schwebel also observes that there is no authentic photo of the solar phenomena claimed, "despite the presence of hundreds of reporters and photographers at the field", and one photo often presented as authentic is actually "a solar eclipse in another part of the world taken sometime before 1917". There is some evidence to the effect that the miracle was expected by witnesses. The witness Joaquim Gregório Tavares, who was present at Fátima on 13 October, states, "We must declare that, although we admit the possibility of some miraculous fact, we were there while having in mind conversations we had earlier with cool-headed persons who were anticipating some changes of colour in the Sun". The villagers in Alburitel were preparing for a Sun miracle too. According to Maria do Carmo, "It was anticipated that the miracle would involve the stars". This is likely because in the months of July, August and September people at Fátima claimed the Sun's light dimmed and the sky became dark enough for stars to become visible. This was denied too by many witnesses from the previous months. She also states that on the morning of October 13, "the people of Alburitel were darkening bits of glass by exposing them to candle-smoke so that they might watch the Sun, with no harm to their eyes."

Supernatural explanations, such as those by Father Pio Scatizzi, who argues that observers in Fátima could not be collectively deceived, or that the effect was not seen by observatories in distant places because of divine intervention have been dismissed by critics who say those taking part in the event could certainly be deceived by their senses, or they could have experienced a localized, natural phenomenon. According to Benjamin Radford, "It is of course dangerous to stare directly at the sun, and to avoid permanently damaging their eyesight, those at Fátima that day were looking up in the sky around the sun, which, if you do it long enough, can give the illusion of the sun moving as the eye muscles tire." Others, such as professor of physics Auguste Meessen, suggest that optical effects created by the human eye can account for the reported phenomenon. Meessen presented his analysis of apparitions and "Miracles of the Sun" at the International Symposium "Science, Religion and Conscience" in 2003. While Meessen felt those who claim to have experienced miracles were "honestly experiencing what they report", he stated Sun miracles cannot be taken at face value and that the reported observations were optical effects caused by prolonged staring at the Sun. Meessen contends that retinal after-images produced after brief periods of Sun gazing are a likely cause of the observed dancing effects. Similarly, Meessen concluded that the color changes witnessed were most likely caused by the bleaching of photosensitive retinal cells.

Domingos Pinto Coelho, on 17 October 1917, approached the phenomenon from a skeptical lens, and indicated he had experienced a similar solar phenomenon in Lisbon. Shortly after the Fátima miracle, the Catholic lawyer Coelho said in his article that a few days later, he saw the exact same motions and colour changes in the Sun as he did on 13 October. He says, "One doubt remained with us however. Was what we saw in the Sun an exceptional thing? Or could it be reproduced in analogous circumstances? Now it was precisely this analogy of circumstances that presented itself to us yesterday. We could see the Sun half overcast as on Saturday. And sincerely, we saw on that day the same succession of colors, the same rotary movement, etc."

Meessen observes that Sun Miracles have been witnessed in many places where religiously charged pilgrims have been encouraged to stare at the Sun. He cites the apparitions at Heroldsbach, Germany (1949) as an example, where many people within a crowd of over 10,000 testified to witnessing similar observations as at Fátima. Meessen also cites a British Journal of Ophthalmology article that discusses some modern examples of Sun Miracles. Prof. Stöckl, a meteorologist from Regensburg, also proposed a similar theory and made similar observations.

Critics also suggest that a combination of clouds, atmospheric effects and natural sunlight could have created the reported visual phenomena. Steuart Campbell, writing for the edition of Journal of Meteorology in 1989, postulated that a cloud of stratospheric dust changed the appearance of the Sun on 13 October, making it easy to look at, and causing it to appear to be yellow, blue, and violet, and to spin. In support of his hypothesis, Campbell reported that a blue and reddened Sun was reported in China as documented in 1983. Paul Simons, in an article entitled "Weather Secrets of Miracle at Fátima", stated that it is possible that some of the optical effects at Fátima may have been caused by a cloud of dust from the Sahara.

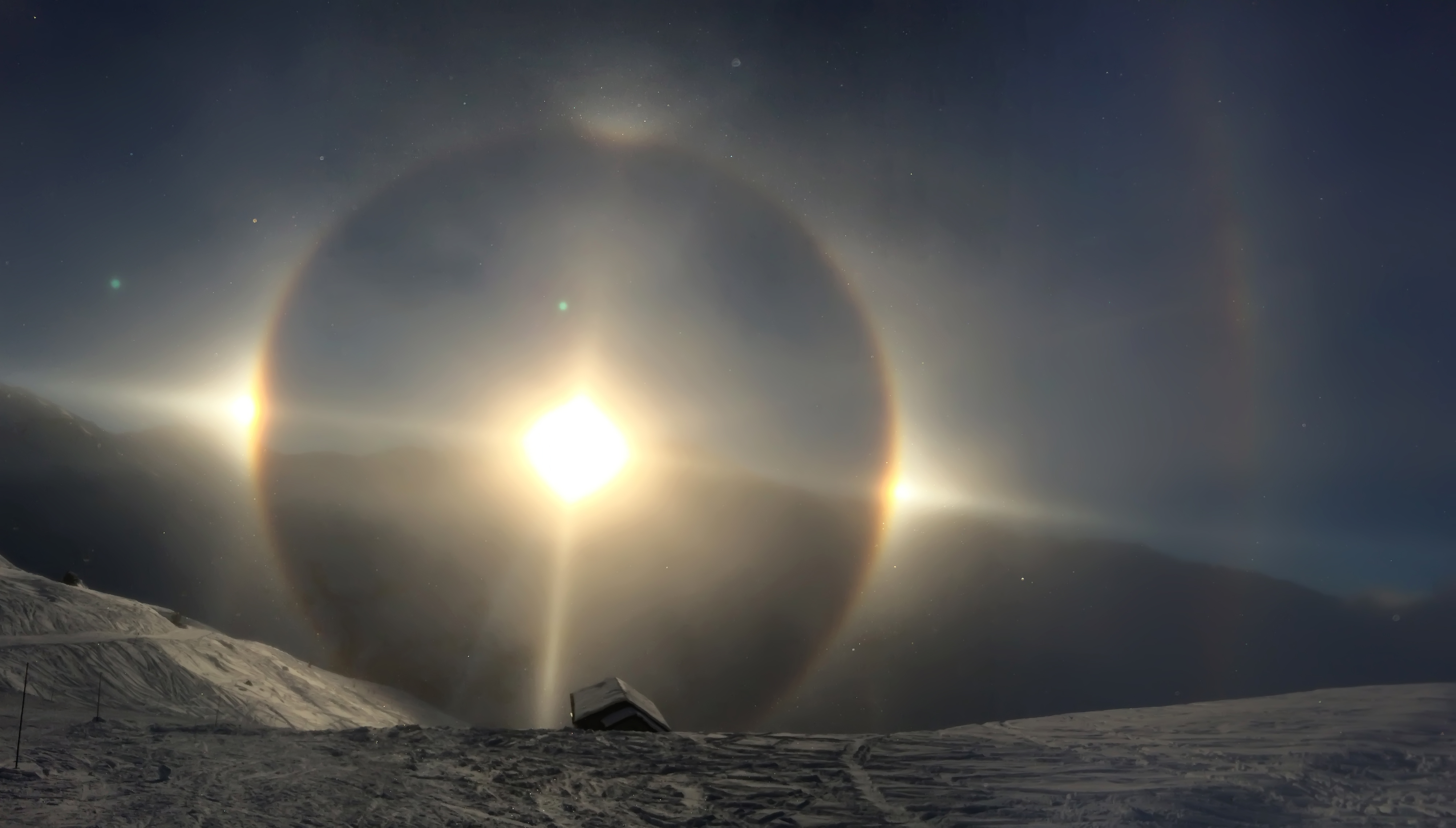
A "false sun" observed in France, 2015

Skeptical investigator Joe Nickell wrote that the "dancing sun" effects reported at Fátima were "a combination of factors, including optical effects and meteorological phenomena, such as the sun being seen through thin clouds, causing it to appear as a silver disc. Other possibilities include an alteration in the density of the passing clouds, causing the sun's image to alternately brighten and dim and so seem to advance and recede, and dust or moisture droplets in the atmosphere refracting the sunlight and thus imparting a variety of colors". Nickell also suggests that unusual visual effects could have resulted from temporary retinal distortion caused by staring at the intense light of the Sun, or have been caused by a sundog, a relatively common atmospheric optical phenomenon. Nickell also highlights the psychological suggestibility of the witnesses, noting that devout spectators often come to locations where Marian apparitions have been reported "fully expecting some miraculous event", such as the 1988 Lubbock apparition of Mary in Texas, the Mother Cabrini Shrine near Denver, Colorado, in 1992, and Conyers, Georgia, in the early to mid-1990s.

Prosper Alfaric of the University of Strasbourg in 1971, attributed the phenomenon to the cultural environment and era. That was according to his perception an isolated and poor village where believing in legends and folklore is common, combined with the 1917 wars of Europe that created food shortages, and in Portugal itself the regular conflict between the secular Republic and Catholic clergy.

== See also ==
- Marian apparition
- The Miracle of Our Lady of Fatima, 1952 film
- Fatima, 2020 film
- Three Secrets of Fátima

== Bibliography ==
- Bennett, Jeffrey S. (2012). When the Sun Danced: Myth, Miracles, and Modernity in Early Twentieth Century. University of Virginia Press. ISBN 978-0-8139-3250-7.
- De Marchi, John (1956). The True Story of Fátima. St. Paul Minnesota: Catechetical Guild Educational Society. OCLC 40630767. (Online Text)
- De Marchi, John (1952b). The Immaculate Heart, The True Story of Our Lady of Fatima. New York: Farrar, Straus and Young. OCLC 2947238.
- McClure, Kevin (1983). The Evidence for Visions of the Virgin Mary. Aquarian Press. ISBN 0-85030-351-6.
