= Moturu Hanumantha Rao =

Indian politician

Rajya Sabha
- In office 3 April 1988 to 2 April 1994

Personal details
- Born: 1917 Vellaturu, Guntur district
- Died: 18 June 2001 (aged 83–84) Hyderabad, India
- Party: Communist Party of India (Marxist)

Moturu Hanumantha Rao (1917-2001) was a Communist party leader in the state of Andhra Pradesh, South India. He married Moturu Udayam.

He was the founder-Editor of the Communist newspaper Prajasakti, published from Vijayawada. Prajasakti was brought out as a daily under the leadership of P. Sundarayya and editorship of Moturu Hanumantha Rao on 1 August 1981, when the first issue was released by E. M. S. Namboodiripad.

(i) Madras Legislative Assembly and Andhra Pradesh Legislative Assembly, 1952–55,

(ii) Andhra Pradesh Legislative Council, 1978–84 and

(iii) Rajya Sabha, 3-4-1988 to 2-4-1994; Chairman, Department-related Parliamentary Standing Committee on Industry, Rajya Sabha, 1993–94; Secretary, Andhra Pradesh State Committee of CPI (M), 1964–82; Author of a few books.

He died in 2001.
