= Chand (name) =

Chand is a given name and surname. Notable people with the name include:

== Given name ==
- Chand Bardai, Indian poet
- Chand Bibi, Indian ruler and warrior
- Chand Burke, Indian actor in Hindi and Punjabi language films
- Chand Kaur, wife of Kharak Singh and regent of the Sikh Empire
- Chand Nawab (born 1963), Pakistani journalist
- Chand Sadagar, river and sea merchant of Champaknagar in Eastern India
- Chand Usmani (1933–1989), Indian actress

== Surname ==
- Amir Chand (1889–1970), Indian physician and teacher of medicine
- Anand Chand (1913–1983), 44th Raja of Bilaspur
- Aakash Chand, Nepali cricketer, medium pace bowler
- Bhuwan Chand (born 1949), Nepali actress
- Bidhi Chand (1579–1638), Sikh religious preacher
- Binayadhoj Chand, Nepalese politician
- Dashrath Chand (1941–?), Nepalese politician and martyr
- Dhyan Chand (1905–1979), Indian field hockey player
- Dutee Chand (born 1996), Indian sprinter
- Ganesh Chand, Fijian academic and politician of Indian descent
- Hari Chand (1953–2022), Indian long-distance runner
- Lokendra Bahadur Chand (born 1940), Nepali politician, speaker of Rastriya Panchayat, prime minister four times between 1983 and 2003
- Meira Chand (born 1942), British novelist of Swiss-Indian parentage
- Mukesh Chand (1923–1976), Indian playback singer
- Nar Bahadur Chand, member of 2nd Nepalese Constituent Assembly belonging to Nepali Congress
- Nek Chand (1924–2015), Indian artist
- Nihâl Chand (1710–1782), Indian painter and poet
- Parmod Chand (born 1955/1956), Fijian politician, member of the Fijian Parliament
- Prithvi Chand, Indian politician
- Ramesh Chand (born 1974), Indian politician
- Rohan Chand (born 2004), American actor
- Rohit Chand (born 1992), Nepalese Footballer
- Sansar Chand (c. 1765 – 1824), Rajput ruler of the state of Kangra in what is now the Indian state of Himachal Pradesh
- Sri Chand (1494–1629), founder of the ascetic sect of Udasin and son of Guru Nanak, first guru and founder of Sikhism
- Tara Chand (archaeologist), Vice-Chancellor of Allahabad University, India
- Tara Chand (Himachal Pradesh politician), member of the Himachal Pradesh Legislative Assembly
- Tara Chand (Jammu-Kashmir politician) (born 1963), member of the Jammu and Kashmir Legislative Assembly
- Tara Chand (Pakistani politician), former Provincial Minister of Balochistan
- Tapan Kumar Chand (born 1959), Indian mining veteran, executive and author
- Unmukt Chand (born 1993), Indian cricketer

== See also ==
- Chand (disambiguation)
