= Chanda (disambiguation) =

Chanda is a poetic meter in Sanskrit.

Chanda may also refer to:

== People ==
=== Given name ===
- Chanda Bwalya, Zambian football player
- Chanda Dancy (born 1978), American musical artist
- Chanda Feldman (born 1976), American poet
- Chanda Gunn (born 1980), American ice hockey player
- Chanda Jog (born 1954), Indian astrophysicist
- Chanda Kochhar (born 1961), Indian banking executive
- Chanda Prescod-Weinstein, American astrophysicist
- Chanda Romero (born 1954), Philippine actress
- Chanda Rubin (born 1976), American tennis player

== Surname ==
- Arnab Chanda, English writer, producer, and actor
- Arun Kumar Chanda (1899–1947), Indian independence activist
- Barun Chanda, Indian actor and author
- Charles Chanda, Zambian politician and businessman
- Hellen Chanda (born 1998), Zambian football forward
- Nayan Chanda (born 1946), Indian journalist
- Raja Chanda, Indian film director
- Ramaprasad Chanda (1873–1942), Indian historian and archaeologist
- Rishi Chanda, Indian music director, composer and singer
- Samir Chanda (1957–2011), Indian art director and production designer
- Sandipan Chanda (born 1983), Indian chess player

== Other uses ==
- Chanda (album), a 1996 album by Zubeen Garg and Jonkie Borthakur
- Chanda (Buddhism), a type of desire that can be wholesome
- Chanda (2007 film), a Kannada film
- Chanda (1962 film), an Urdu film
- Chanda (fish), a fish genus
- Chanda (monster), a mythological demon in Hinduism
- Chanda, Raebareli, a village in Uttar Pradesh, India
- Chanda, now Chandrapur, a city in Maharashtra, India
- Chanda district, now Chandrapur district, Maharashtra, India

== See also ==
- Chandra (disambiguation)
- Chand (disambiguation)
- Chandu (disambiguation)
- Chandni (disambiguation)
- Chandamama (disambiguation)
- Chandi (disambiguation)
- Chanda (surname)
