= Chandu =

Chandu may refer to:

== Entertainment ==
- Chandu (1958 film), a 1958 Hindi film
- Chandu (2001 film), a 2001 Telugu film
- Chandu (2002 film), a 2002 Kannada film
- Chandu the Magician, an American radio series
- Chandu the Magician (film), a 1932 film adaptation of the radio series

== People ==
- Chandu Shah, was Mughal official
- Chandra, Shekhar Prasad (20 September 1964 – 31 March 1997), an Indian activist and student leader
- Chandu Lal, (1833–1844) Prime minister for the 3rd Nizam of Hyderabad
- Chandu (film director) (born 1975), Indian film director, producer, and screenwriter
- Chandu Borde (born 1934), Indian cricketer
- Chandu Chekaver, a legendary Hindu warrior
- Chandu Lal Sahu (born 1959), Indian politician
- Chandu Sarwate (1920–2003), Indian cricketer
- Pazhayamviden Chandu, an Indian general
- Thacholi Chandu, a legendary Hindu warrior

== Fictional characters ==
- Chandu, a tiger sidekick to Sindbad in Sindbad's Storybook Voyage

== Other uses ==
- Chandu (opium), a form of opium
- Chandu, Gurgaon, a village near Gurgaon in Northern India

== See also ==
- Chand (disambiguation)
- Chanda (disambiguation)
- Chandra (disambiguation)
- Bukit Chandu (disambiguation)
