= Chandrakala (disambiguation) =

Chandrakala (1950/1951 – 1999) was an Indian actress.

Chandrakala may also refer to:

- Chandrakkala, a type of virama or diacritical mark in Indian scripts
- Chandrakala (dessert), an Indian sweet
- Chandrakala A. Hate (1903–1990), Indian academic
- Chandrakala Mohan, Indian actress in Kannada cinema
- Chandrakala Padia, Indian academic
- Chandrakala S. Kammath, Indian writer in the Malayalam-language

== See also ==
- Chandra (disambiguation)
- Kala (disambiguation)
