= Chandrika =

Chandrika may refer to:

== Media ==
- Chandrika (film), 1950 Indian film
- Chandrika (newspaper), Indian newspaper

== People ==
- Chandrika (Kannada actress), Indian actress
- Chandrika Balan (Chandramathi), Indian writer
- Chandrika Kumaratunga, former Sri Lankan President
- Chandrika Prasad Srivastava, Indian diplomat
- Chandrika Ravi, Indian Australian model and actress
- Rajendra Chandrika, West Indian cricket wicketkeeper and opening batsman
- Udaya Chandrika, Indian actress in Kannada cinema

== Other uses ==
- Chandrika (soap), Indian soap brand of SV Products

== See also ==
- Chandra (disambiguation)
- Chandni (disambiguation)
- Chandi (disambiguation)
