= Tara Chand =

Tara Chand may refer to:

- Tara Chand (Pakistani politician), Provincial Minister of Balochistan, Pakistan
- Tara Chand (archaeologist), Vice-Chancellor of Allahabad University, India
- Tara Chand (Himachal Pradesh politician), member of the Himachal Pradesh Legislative Assembly
- Tara Chand (Jammu-Kashmir politician) (born 1963), member of the Jammu and Kashmir Legislative Assembly
