= Chandni =

Chandni may refer to:

- Chandni, a Hindu lunar goddess, wife of Chandra
- Chandni (1989 film), an Indian romantic musical film by Yash Raj Chopra
- Chandni (1991 film), a Bangladeshi romantic musical film by Ehtesham
- "Chandini", a song by Vandemataram Srinivas, Udit Narayan and Swarnalata from the 2001 Indian film Ammayi Kosam
- "Chandini", a song by Kataaksh, Aditya Bisht, and 7Bantai'Z from the 2026 Indian film Tu Yaa Main
- Chandni Chopra, a fictional teacher in the 2004 Indian film Main Hoon Na, played by Sushmita Sen
- Chandni FC, a football club in Kozhikode, Kerala, India

== People ==
- Chandni (Bollywood actress) (fl. 1991–96), Indian actress in Bollywood films
- Chandni Khan (born 1997), Indian activist

== See also ==
- Chandra (disambiguation)
- Chanda (disambiguation)
- Chand (disambiguation)
- Chandi (disambiguation)
- Chandrika (disambiguation)
- Chandni Chowk (disambiguation)
