= Chandra (disambiguation) =

Chandra is a Hindu lunar deity.

Chandra may also refer to:

== People ==
- Ambrish Chandra (fl. 1970s–2020s), Indian-Canadian engineer
- Ashok K. Chandra (1948–2014), Indian computer scientist
- Bhagwat Chandrasekhar (born 1945), Indian cricketer
- Bipan Chandra (1928–2014), Indian historian
- Lokesh Chandra (born 1927), Indian Buddhist scholar
- Ranjit Chandra (born 1938), Indian-Canadian immunologist accused of academic fraud
- Subrahmanyan Chandrasekhar (1910–1995), Indian-American Nobel Prize winning astrophysicist who formulated what was later called the Chandrasekhar limit
- Vikram Chandra (novelist) (born 1961), an Indian author
- Chandra Bahadur Dangi (1939–2015), the world's shortest person
- Chandra Ford (fl. 2010s–2020s), an American public health academic
- Chandra Levy (1977–2001), an American murder victim whose disappearance made national headlines in 2001
- Chandra Pasma (born 1979), Canadian politician
- Chandra Prakash Gharti (born 1981), Nepalese politician
- Chandra Shekhar (1927–2007), 8th Prime Minister of India
- Chandra West (born 1970), Canadian actress
- Chandra Wickramasinghe (born 1939), British-Sri Lankan astronomer
- Chandra Wilson (born 1969), American actress
- Chandraprakash Dwivedi (born 1960), Indian film director and writer
- Satish Chandra, an Indian name

== Astronomy ==
- Chandra X-ray Observatory, a satellite launched by NASA in 1999, and named after Subrahmanyan Chandrasekhar
- 1958 Chandra, an asteroid named after Subrahmanyan Chandrasekhar

== History ==
- Chandravamsha (Lunar dynasty), a mythical Hindu dynasty
- Chandragupta Maurya or Chandra Gupta Maurya, founder of the Indian Mauryan Empire
- Chandragupta I or Chandra Gupta I, king of the ancient Indian Gupta Empire
- Chandragupta II or Chandra Gupta II, king of the ancient Indian Gupta Empire
- Chandradeva, 12th century Gahadavala king of medieval India
- Chandar (Chach Nama), king of Sindh and Buddhist ascetic

== Geography ==
- Chandra, Comoros, a village
- Chandra, Paschim Medinipur, a village in West Bengal, India
- Storm Chandra, a 2026 windstorm over the British Isles
- Chandra Taal, a lake in the Himalayas

== Entertainment ==
- Chandra (film), 2013 Indian film by Roopa Iyer
- Chandra (band), an American post-punk band
- Dr. Sivasubramanian Chandrasegarampillai, Dr. R. Chandra, a character in Arthur C. Clarke's Space Odyssey series
- Chandra Nalaar, a character in the card game Magic: The Gathering
- Dr. Chandra Suresh, a character in the American TV drama series Heroes
- "Chandra" (song), from the 2022 Indian Marathi-language film Chandramukhi
- Chandra, a character from the Upside-Down Magic (film)
- Belinda Chandra

== See also ==
- Chandni (disambiguation)
- Chanda (disambiguation)
- Chandu (disambiguation)
- Chandrakala (disambiguation)
- Chandrapur (disambiguation)
- Chandrayaan programme, Indian lunar exploration mission
  - Chandrayaan-1
  - Chandrayaan-2
  - Chandrayaan-3
