= Indian Institute of Advanced Study =

Research institute in Shimla, India

- Bhāratīya Ucca Adhyayana Saṁsthāna

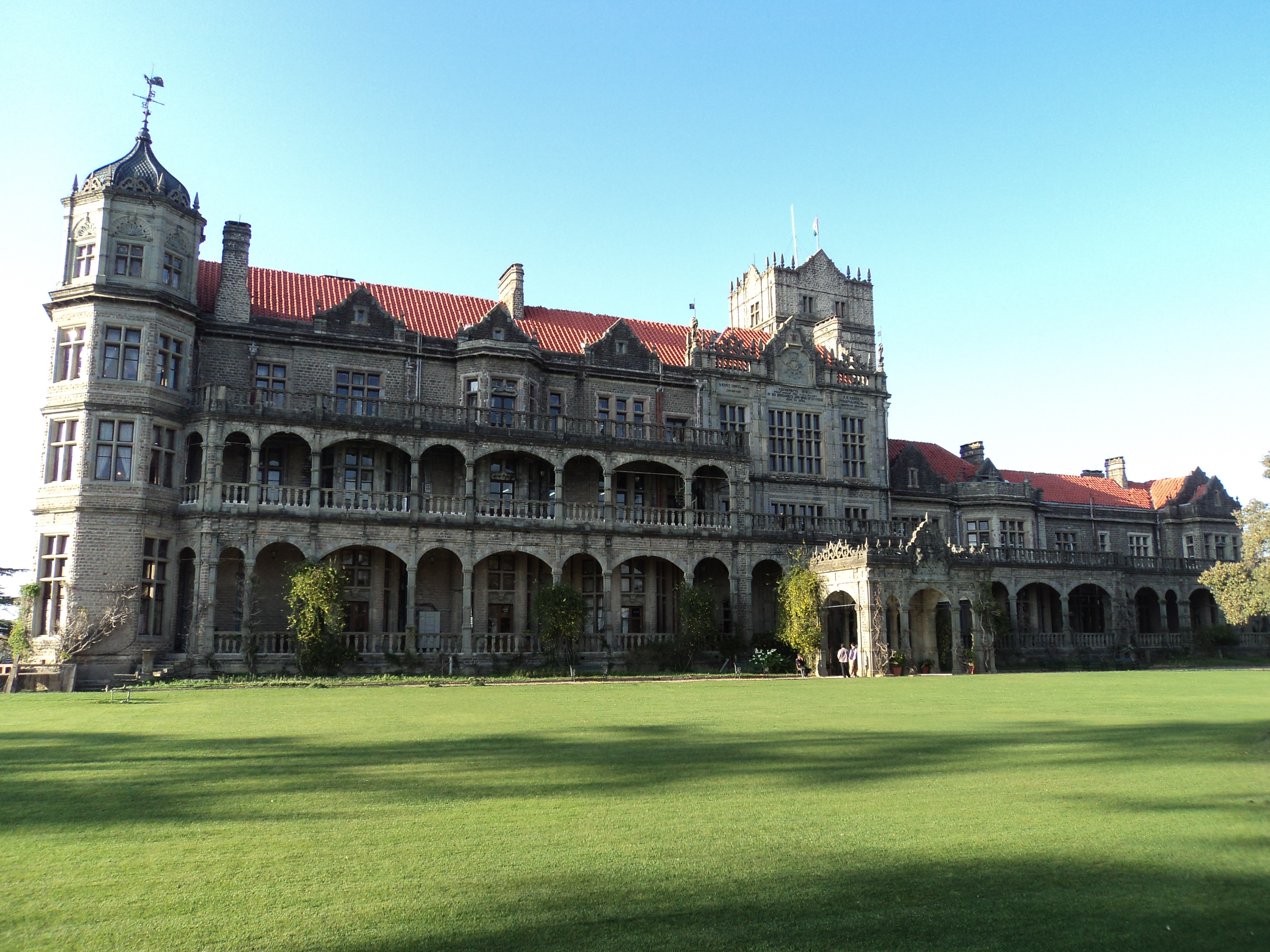
- IIAS campus at Viceregal Lodge, Simla
- Nickname: IIAS
- Motto: Sanskrit: Jñānamayaṃ Tapaḥ (Austerity consisting Knowledge)
- Established: 20 October 1965; 61 years ago
- Research type: Humanities, social sciences, natural sciences and life sciences
- Budget: ₹25 crore (US$2.7 million) (2024—25)
- President: Shashi Prabha Kumar
- Vice president: Shailendra Raj Mehta
- Director: Himanshu Kumar Chaturvedi
- Staff: 23
- Location: Rashtrapati Niwas, Shimla, Himachal Pradesh, 171005, India; 31°6′12.946″N 77°8′31.927″E
- Campus: 110 acres (45 ha)
- Website: www.iias.ac.in

Map
- Location within Himachal Pradesh Location within India

The Indian Institute of Advanced Study (IIAS) is a research institute located atop of Observatory Hill, Boileauganj, Shimla. It was set up by the Ministry of Education, Government of India in 1964 and started functioning from 20 October 1965. It is currently housed in the former Rashtrapati Niwas building.

== History and establishment ==
The building that houses the institute was originally built as a home for Lord Dufferin, Viceroy of India from 1884 to 1888, and was called the Viceregal Lodge. It housed all the subsequent viceroys and governors-general of India. It occupies Observatory Hill, one of the seven hills that Shimla is built upon.

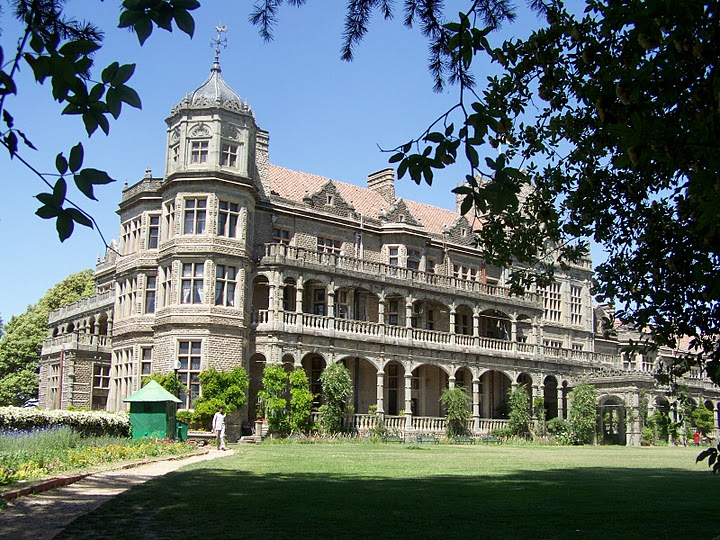
The building is designed in Jacobethan style.

The building was designed by Henry Irwin, an architect in the Public Works Department. The Viceregal Lodge had electricity as early as 1888, much before the rest of the town of Shimla. The building also was equipped with a sophisticated firefighting mechanism through wax-tipped water ducts.

Many historic decisions were taken in the building during the Indian independence movement. The Simla Conference, to discuss self-rule for India, was held here in 1945. The decision to carve out Pakistan and East Pakistan from India was also taken here in 1947.

After India gained independence, the building was renamed as Rashtrapati Niwas and was used as a summer retreat for the president of India. However, due to its neglect, Dr. S Radhakrishnan decided to turn it into a centre of higher learning. The summer retreat of the president was shifted from here to a building known as "The Retreat" situated in Chharabra, on the outskirts of Shimla.

The Indian Institute of Advanced Study was first created as a society on 6 October 1964. The institute was formally inaugurated by Prof. S. Radhakrishnan on 20 October 1965. Professor of history Niharranjan Ray was appointed as the first director of the institute. Chandrakala Padia was the first women chairperson of IIAS.

== Administration ==
The institute is administered by a Society and a Governing Body, the members of which come from varied backgrounds. A statutory Finance Committee advises the Governing Body in financial matters.

The director of the institute is assisted by a secretary, a deputy secretary a public relations officer and other supervisory staff.

== Academics ==
The fellows currently focus on the following areas:

- Humanities
  - Arts and Aesthetics
  - Comparative Study of Literature
  - Study of Religion and Philosophy
- Social Sciences
  - Development Studies
  - Comparative Study of Political Institutions
  - Socio-economic and Socio-Cultural Formation in Historical Perspective.
- Natural and Life Sciences
  - State Policies on Science and Technology
  - Science, Technology and Development
  - Methodologies and Techniques.

== The International Centre for Human Development (IC4HD) ==
The International Centre for Human Development (IC4HD) is set up in IIAS to support efforts by governments of the South to integrate human development approaches and ensure improved development outcomes for poor and marginalized people. The IC4HD center was inaugurated on 19 August 2013 in the institute with the aim to promote policy dialogue on human development in the Global South and work towards translating human development analysis into action. The partnership between the Ministry of Human Resource Development, Government of India, the Indian Institute of Advanced Study, and the United Nations Development Programme (UNDP) was officially launched at an event held in Delhi on 4 January 2013. The centre will provide a range of services to national governments in translating human development approach into policy through a four-pronged approach viz. Policy Advisory Services, South-South Cooperation, Research on HD issues and Monitoring and Evaluation.

== Tagore Centre ==
On the 150th birth anniversary of Rabindranath Tagore, the Indian Institute of Advanced Study (IIAS) was awarded the Tagore Centre for the Study of Culture and Civilization by the HRD Ministry of Government of India.

Activities of the Tagore Centre

- There are four fellows in residence at the Centre every year. None of the fellows are permanent and their term is for a minimum of six months to a maximum of two years. They enjoy facilities similar to those enjoyed by the fellows of IIAS. One of the fellows may be either a poet, or a writer, or an artist-in-residence as a tribute to Tagore's multifaceted personality. Another may be a scholar from outside India. The fellows are known as Tagore Fellows.
- An annual International Seminar on some aspect of Tagore's concerns is proposed to be conducted. This will preferably not be of an exegetical nature but more an engagement with his substantial concerns as stated in the vision document.
- A study week on Tagore's works would be organized every alternate year.
- An artist camp could perhaps be organized every alternate year.
- An annual Tagore Lecture would be organized.

== IIAS Library ==
Established in 1965, the library has been established to facilitate, promote and support research to Fellows of the institute. It is one of the leading research and reference libraries in Humanities and Social Science in the country. The social science collections are worldwide in coverage and significance.

== Publications ==
The institute has published over 450 works. These include monographs submitted by its fellows; edited proceedings of seminars, symposia, workshops and conferences held at the institute; lectures given by visiting professors; and occasional papers presented by fellows and visitors to the institute.

The institute also publishes two academic journals. Their review journal, Summerhill: IIAS Review, carries reviews of books published by the institute and those received from outside, as well as interviews and important information about the various academic activities of the institute. A biannual journal, Studies in Humanities and Social Sciences, is published under the auspices of the Inter-University Centre for Humanities and Social Sciences.

== Gallery ==
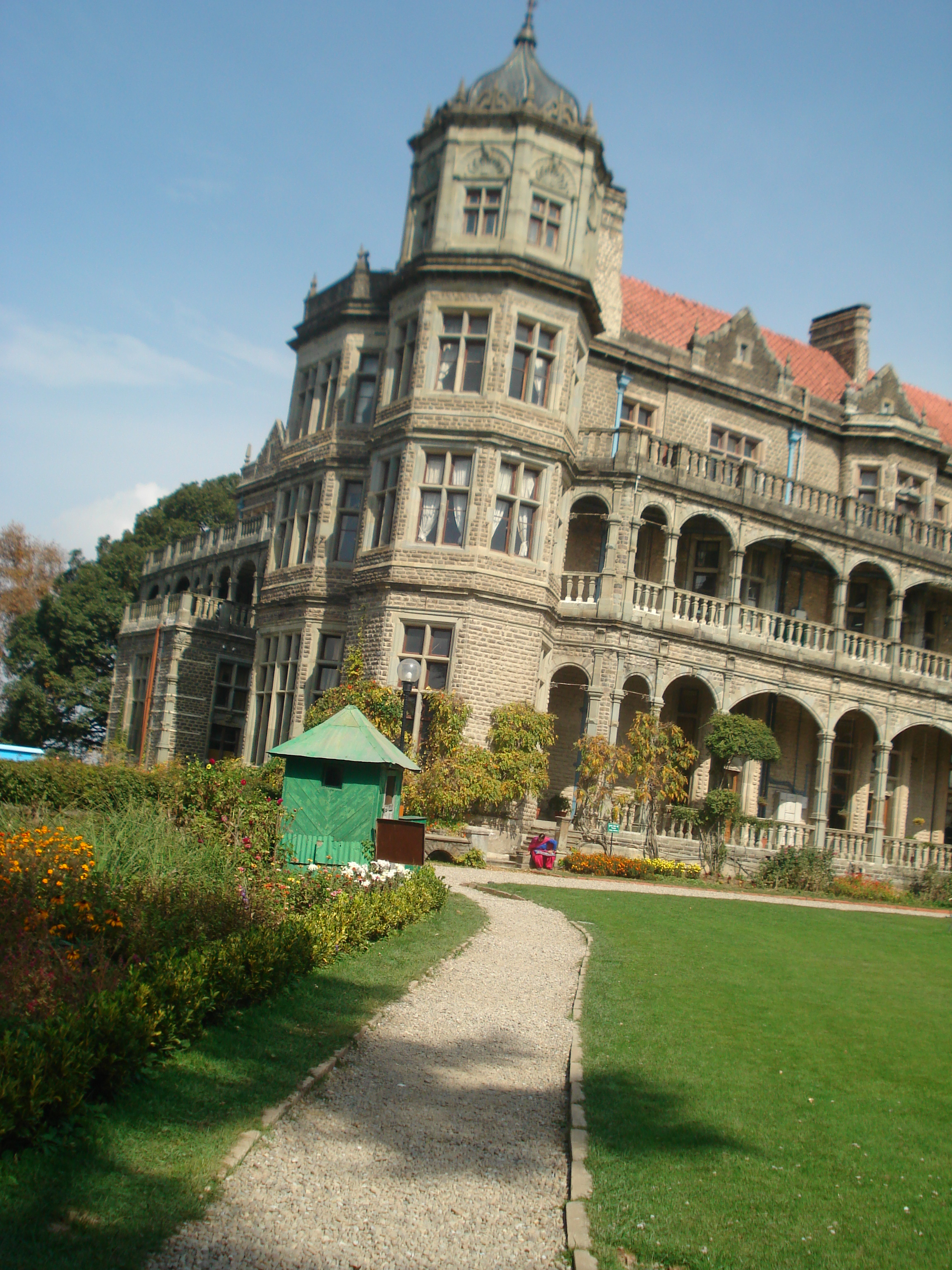

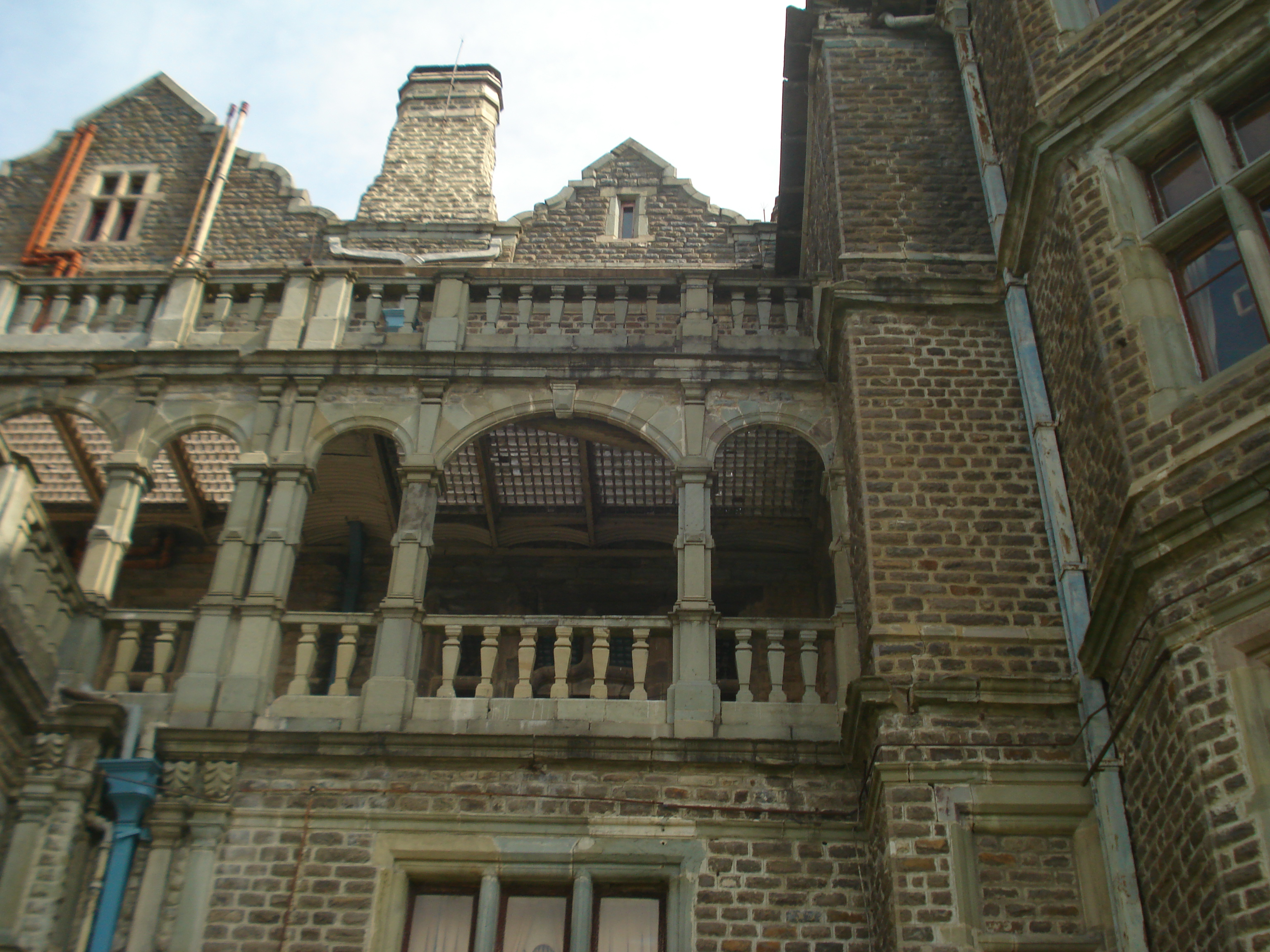

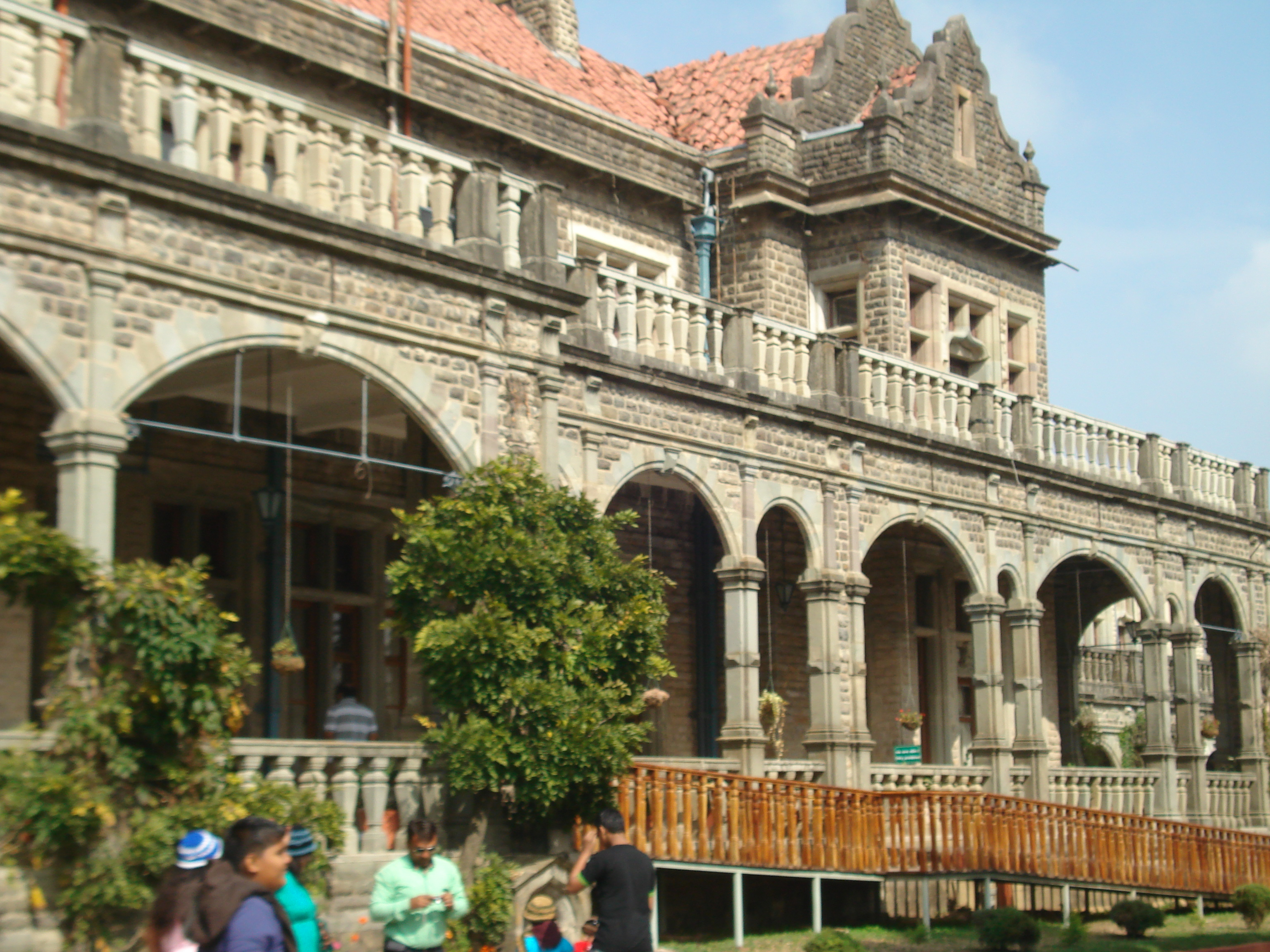

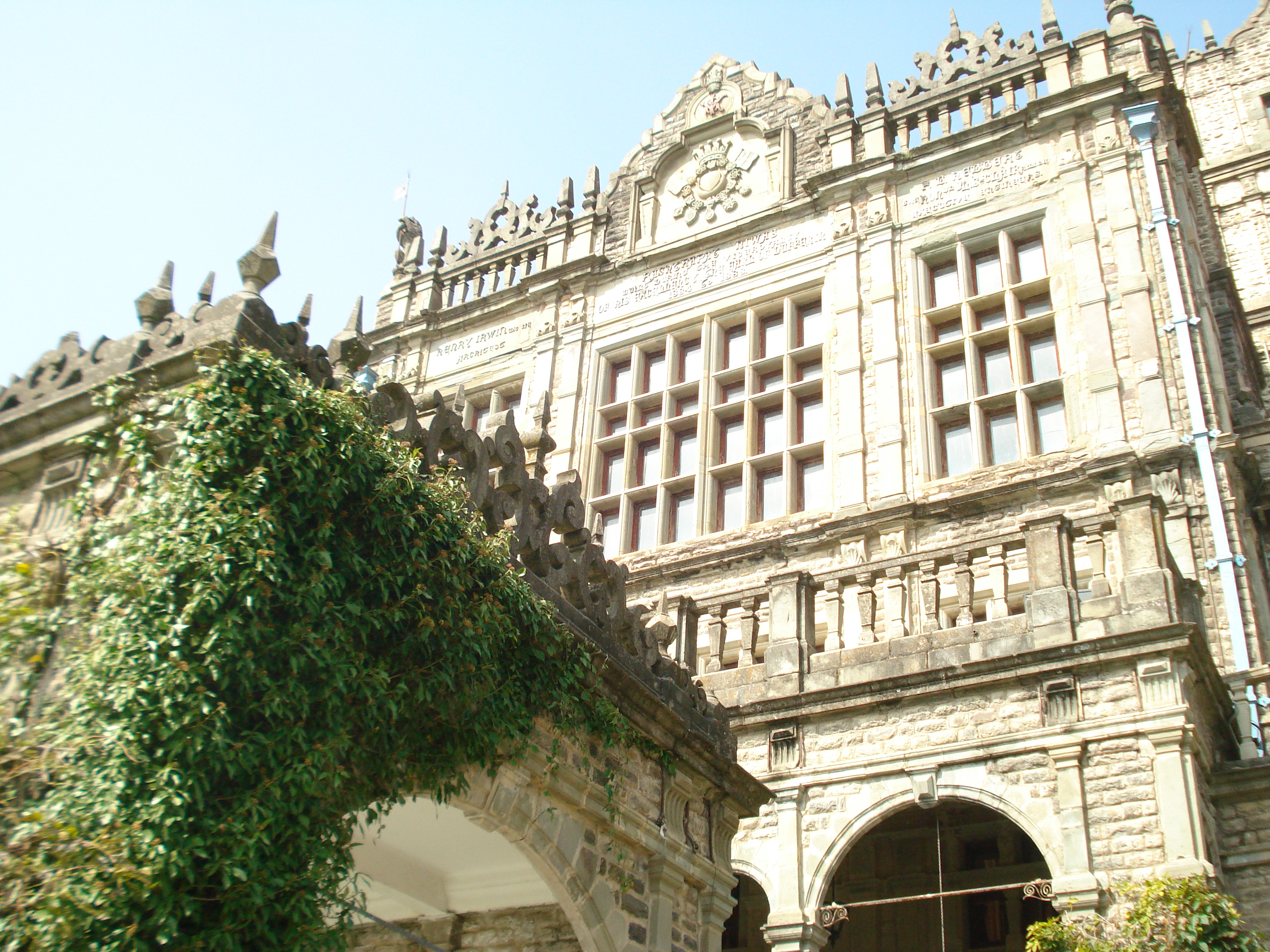

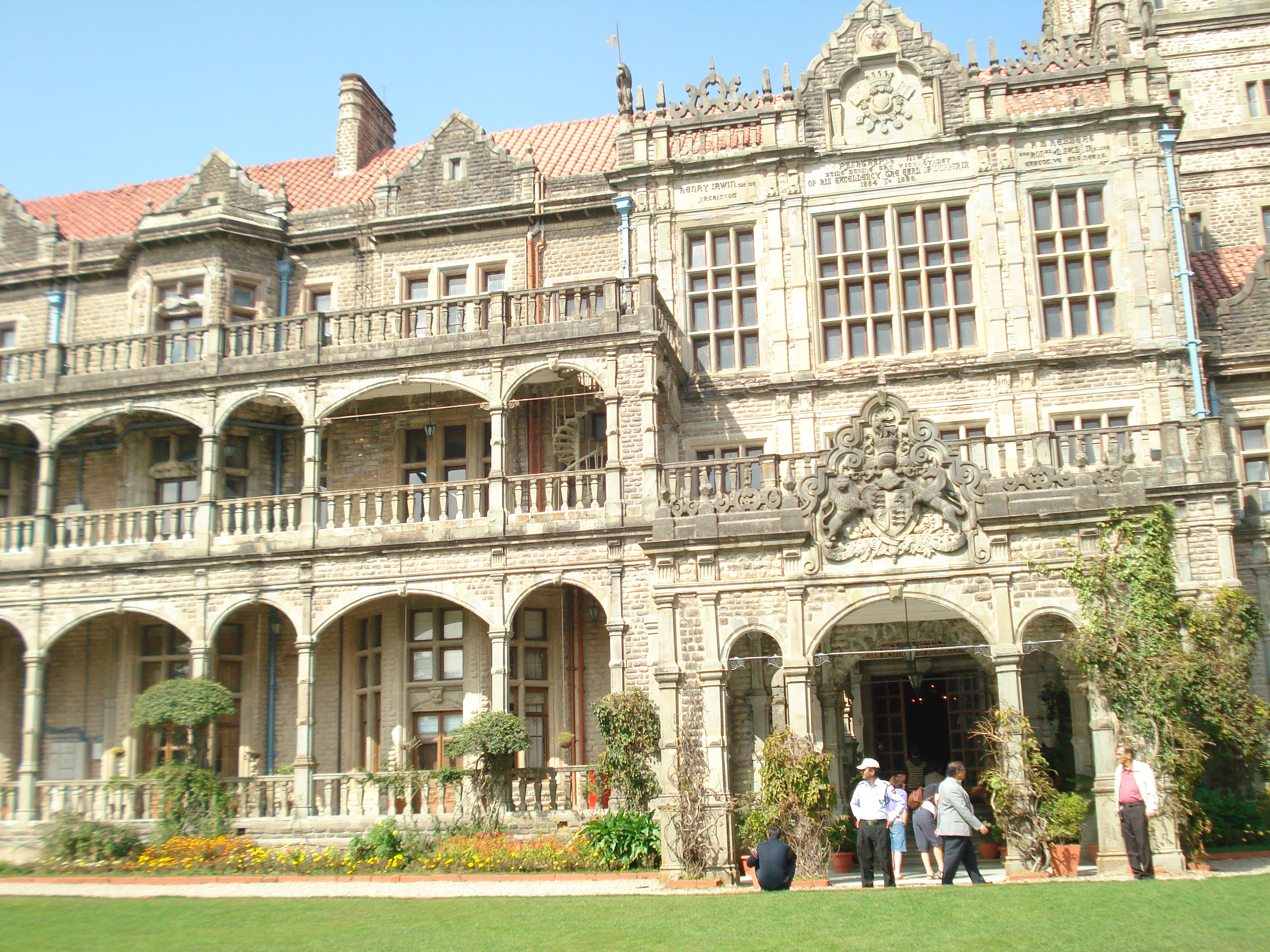

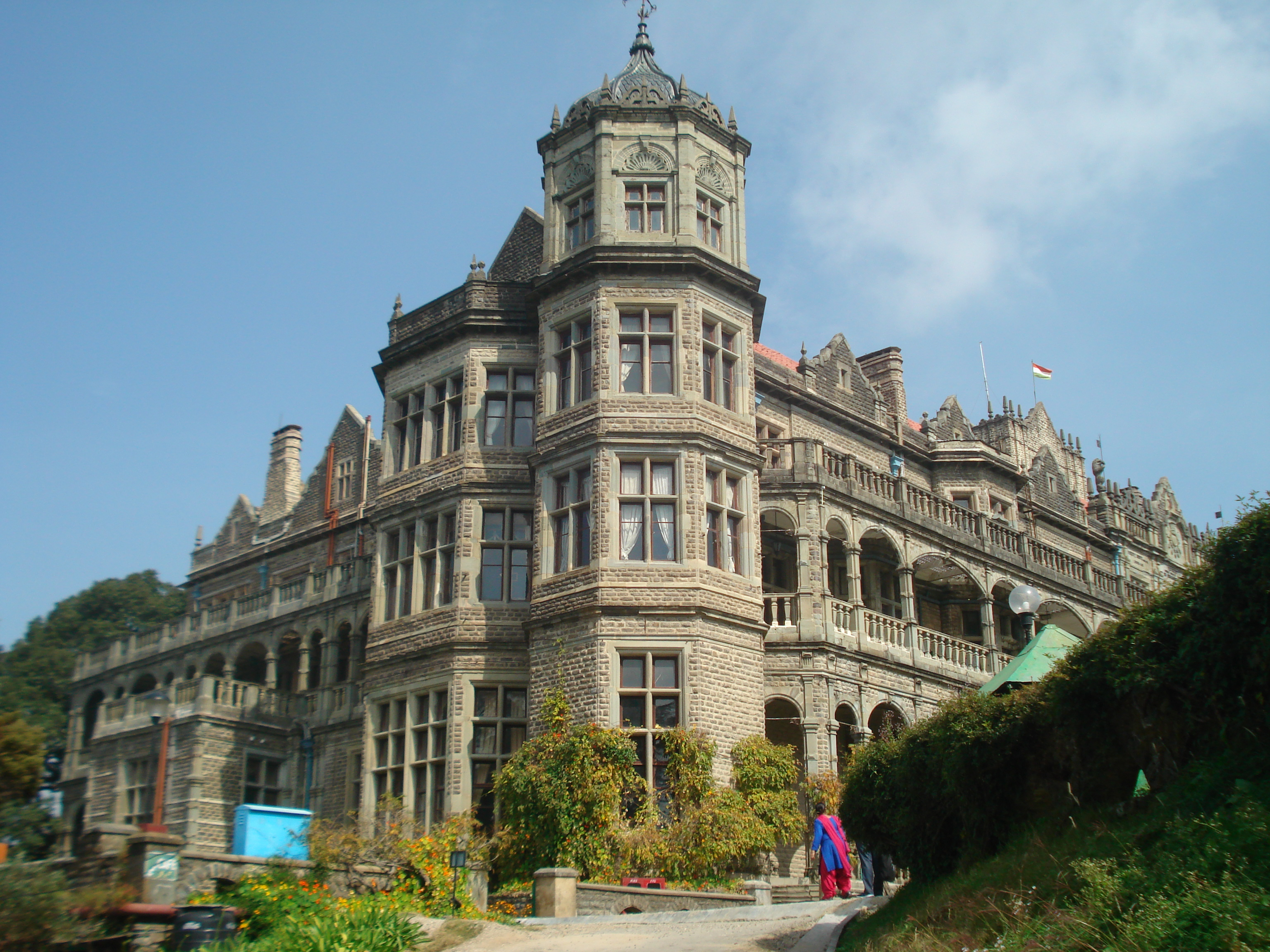

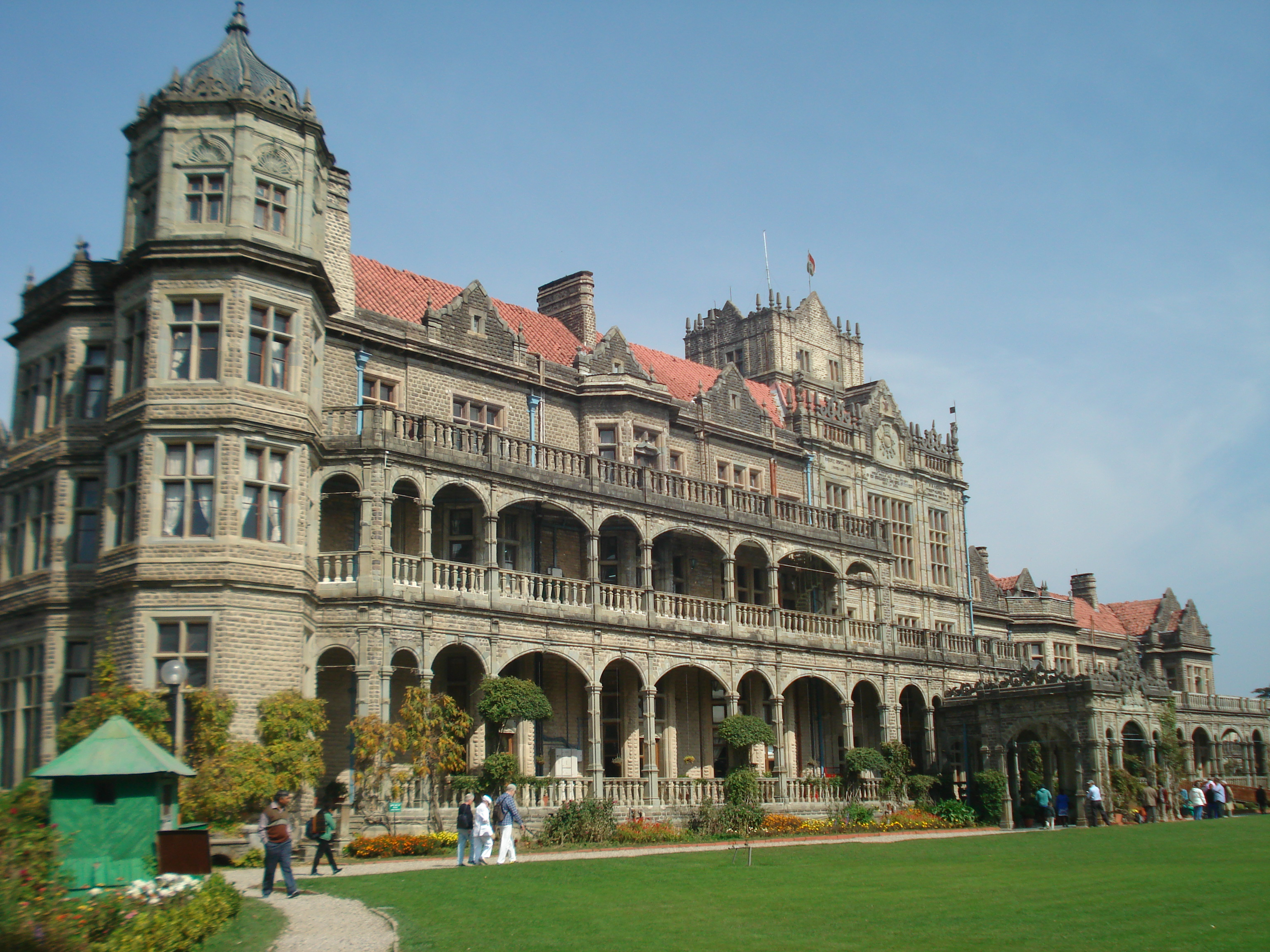

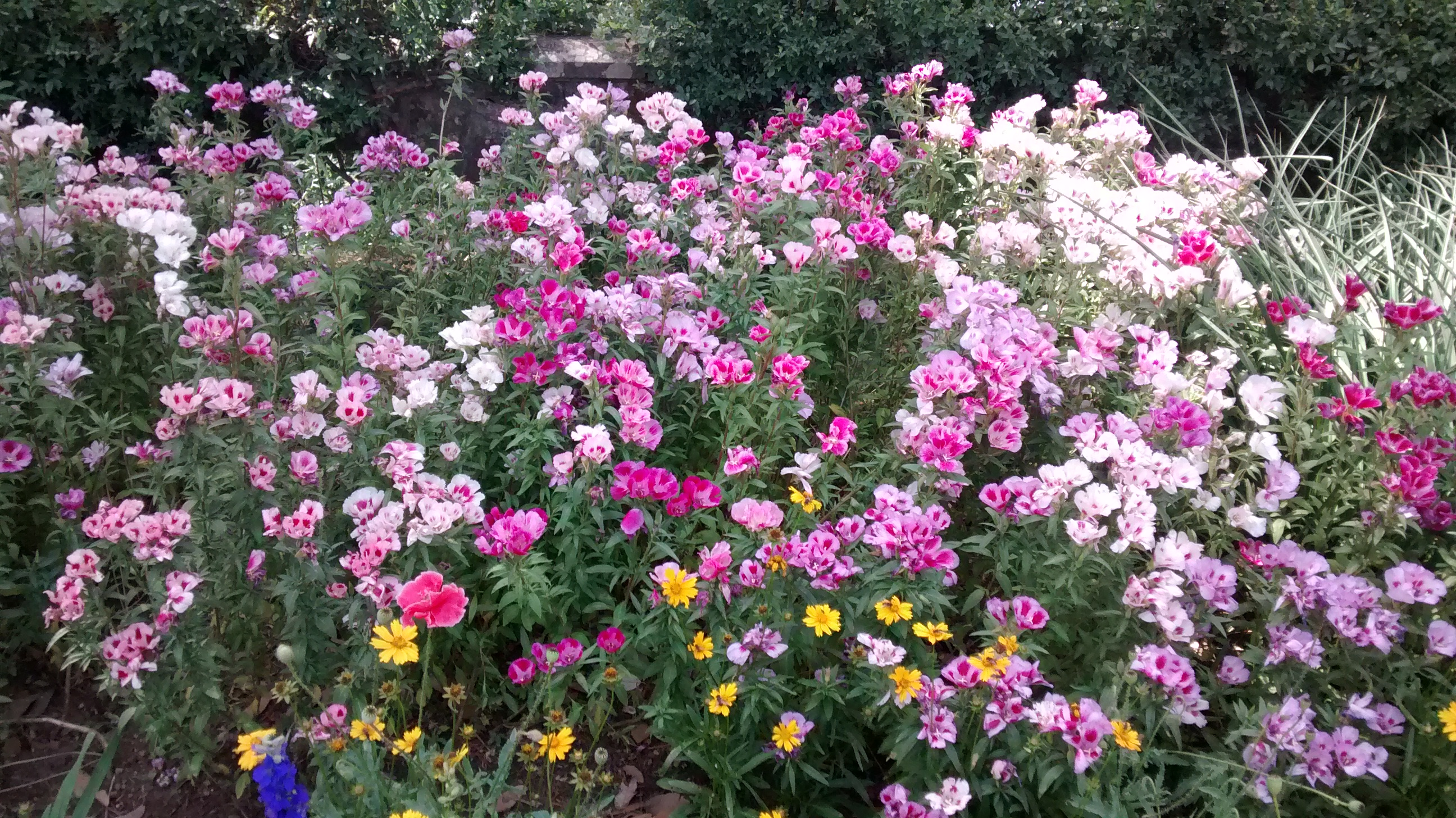

== See also ==
- Fellows of the Indian Institute of Advanced Study
