= Chandamama (disambiguation) =

Chandamama (lit. 'Moon Uncle' in Indian languages; cf. Mother Earth) may refer to:

- A popular lullaby from India
  - Moon-Uncle, Moon-Uncle: Rhymes from India, a 1972 book by Sylvia Cassedy and Parvathi Thampi, illustrated by Susanne Suba
- Chandamama, an Indian monthly magazine focused on kids and youngsters
- Chandamama (1999 film), an Indian Malayalam-language film starring Kunchacko Boban
- Chandamama (2007 film), an Indian Telugu-language film by Krishna Vamsi
- Chandamama (2013 film), an Indian Tamil-language film starring Karunas
- "Chanda Mama Door Ke" (lit. 'Moon Uncle From Far Away'), a song by Chandra and Asha Bhosle from the 1955 film Vachan

== See also ==
- Chanda (disambiguation)
