= Chandni Chowk (disambiguation) =

Chandni Chowk may refer to:

- Chandni Chowk, Delhi, a market in Delhi, India
  - Chandni Chowk Assembly constituency, a constituency in Delhi Assembly
  - Chandni Chowk Lok Sabha constituency, a parliamentary constituency in India
  - Chandni Chowk metro station (Delhi), a station of Delhi metro
  - Chandni Chowk (film), a 1954 Indian film
  - Chandni Chowk to China, a 2009 Indian film
- Chandni Chowk, Cuttack, a neighborhood in Cuttack, India
- Chandni Chowk, Dhaka, a market in Dhaka, Bangladesh
- Chandni Chowk, Kolkata, a neighbourhood in Kolkata, India
  - Chandni Chowk metro station (Kolkata), a station of Kolkata metro
- Chandni Chowk Flyover, a bridge in Rawalpindi, Pakistan
