= Chandratal Wildlife Sanctuary =

Wildlife sanctuary in Himachal Pradesh, India

- IUCN category IV (habitat/species management area)
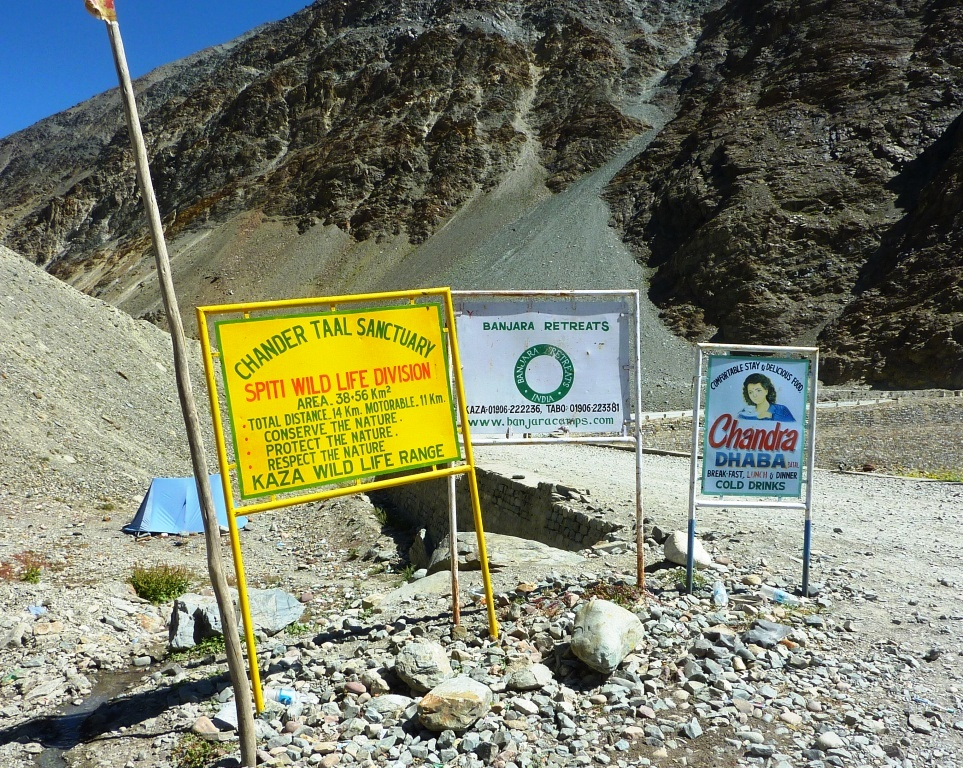
- Sign board of the Chandratal Wildlife Sanctuary

- Location within Himachal Pradesh Location within India
- Interactive map of Chandratal Wildlife Sanctuary
- Location: Lahaul and Spiti district, Himachal Pradesh, India
- Coordinates: 32.4752°N 77.6171°E
- Area: 38.56 km^{2} (14.89 sq mi)
- Established: 2007
- Governing body: Himachal Pradesh Forest Department

Chandratal Wildlife Sanctuary is a wildlife sanctuary in Lahaul and Spiti district in the Indian state of Himachal Pradesh. It was first notified on 14 May 2007 and received final notification in June 2013 under the Wildlife Protection Act, 1972.

== Wildlife and habitat ==
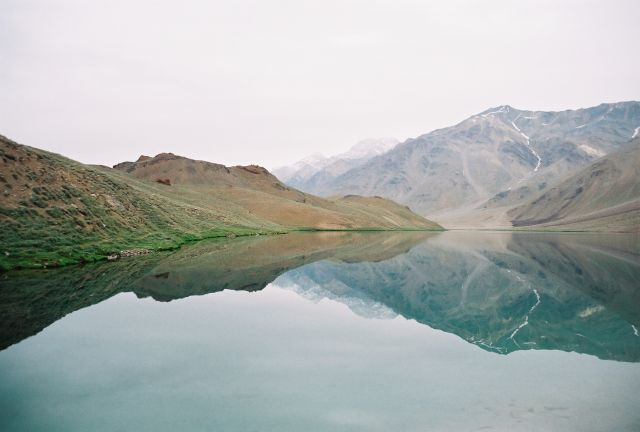
Chandratal Lake

It surrounds Chandratal Lake, a high-altitude wetland designated as a Ramsar site in 2005. Its characterised by alpine meadows, rocky terrain and cold desert ecosystems.

Fauna recorded include snow leopard (Panthera uncia), Himalayan ibex (Capra ibex), blue sheep (Pseudois nayaur), red fox (Vulpes vulpes), marmot (Marmota bobak), Himalayan snowcock, chukar partridge, black-winged stilt, brahminy duck (Tadorna ferruginea) and golden eagle (Aquila chrysaetos).

== Conservation and management ==
The sanctuary is managed by the Himachal Pradesh Forest Department. The official management plan of the sanctuary covers zoning, grazing control, eco-tourism regulation and ecological monitoring.

In June 2025, a seasonal police check post was established at Chandratal to enhance tourist safety, emergency response and real‑time weather/route updates—reflecting the region's growing focus on responsible tourism management.

The Forest Department also has imposed daily entry and activity fees (e.g.: ₹150 per Indian tourist, ₹500 per foreign national) to manage growing visitor numbers and protect ecological integrity.

== Threats ==
Tourism-related pressures include littering, vegetation trampling and non‑compliance with e‑pass and safety protocols—local authorities have issued repeated warnings against swimming in the icy lake and disregarding registration requirements.

Unseasonal snowfall in July 2023 left over 250 tourists stranded at Chandratal for several days, prompting large-scale rescue operations involving helicopters and road clearance teams—highlighting vulnerability to weather extremes and the importance of preparedness.

== See also ==
- List of wildlife sanctuaries of India
- Bir Aishvan Wildlife Sanctuary
