= Chand =

Chand may refer to:

- Chand (name), a given name, middle name, and surname
- Chand kings, a medieval Rajput ruling clan
- Chand (film), a 1959 Indian Hindi-language film
- Sri Chand (1494–1629), Sikh ascetic and founder of Udasi

== Places ==
- Chand, Kaimur, a village in Bihar, India
- Chand, a tehsil and village in Chhindwara district, Madhya Pradesh, India

== See also ==
- Chaand Raat, the eve of the Muslim festival of Eid ul-Fitr
- Chanda (disambiguation)
- Chandi (disambiguation)
- Chandu (disambiguation)
- Chandni (disambiguation)
- Chandpur (disambiguation)
