= Chandra Taal =

Lake in Himachal Pradesh, India

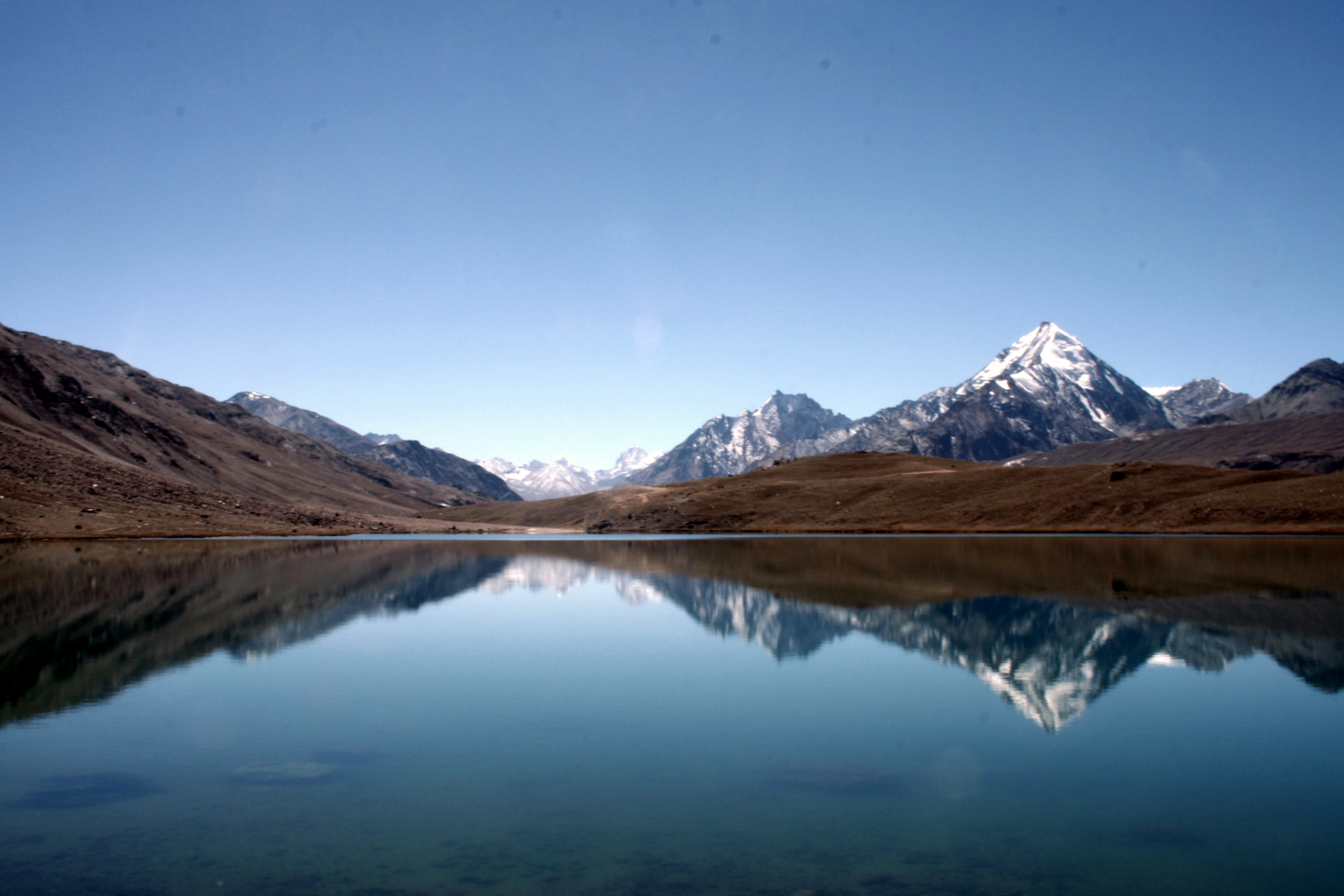

- Location within Himachal Pradesh
- Location: Western Himalaya, Lahaul Valley, Himachal Pradesh
- Coordinates: 32.47518°N 77.61706°E
- Type: Sweet Water Lake
- Basin countries: India
- Max. length: 1.76 km (1.09 mi)
- Max. width: 0.41 km (0.25 mi)
- Surface area: 0.488 km^{2} (0.188 sq mi)
- Average depth: 23.9 ft (7.3 m)
- Max. depth: 139.4 ft (42.5 m)
- Water volume: 886.85 acres (358.90 ha)
- Surface elevation: 4,250 m (13,940 ft)
- Frozen: December-March
- Islands: 1

Ramsar Wetland
- Official name: Chandertal Wetland
- Designated: 8 November 2005
- Reference no.: 1569

Chandra Taal (lit. 'moon lake') is a lake in the upper Chandra valley of the Lahul and Spiti district of Himachal Pradesh, India. Chandra Taal is near the source of the Chandra River. Despite the rugged and inhospitable surroundings, it is in a protected niche with some flowers and wildlife in summer. It is a favourite spot for tourists and high-altitude trekkers. It is usually associated with Spiti, although geographically it lies in the watershed of the Chandra River of Lahaul. Kunzum La separates Lahaul and Spiti valleys. It's surrounded by the Chandratal Wildlife Sanctuary.

== Description ==
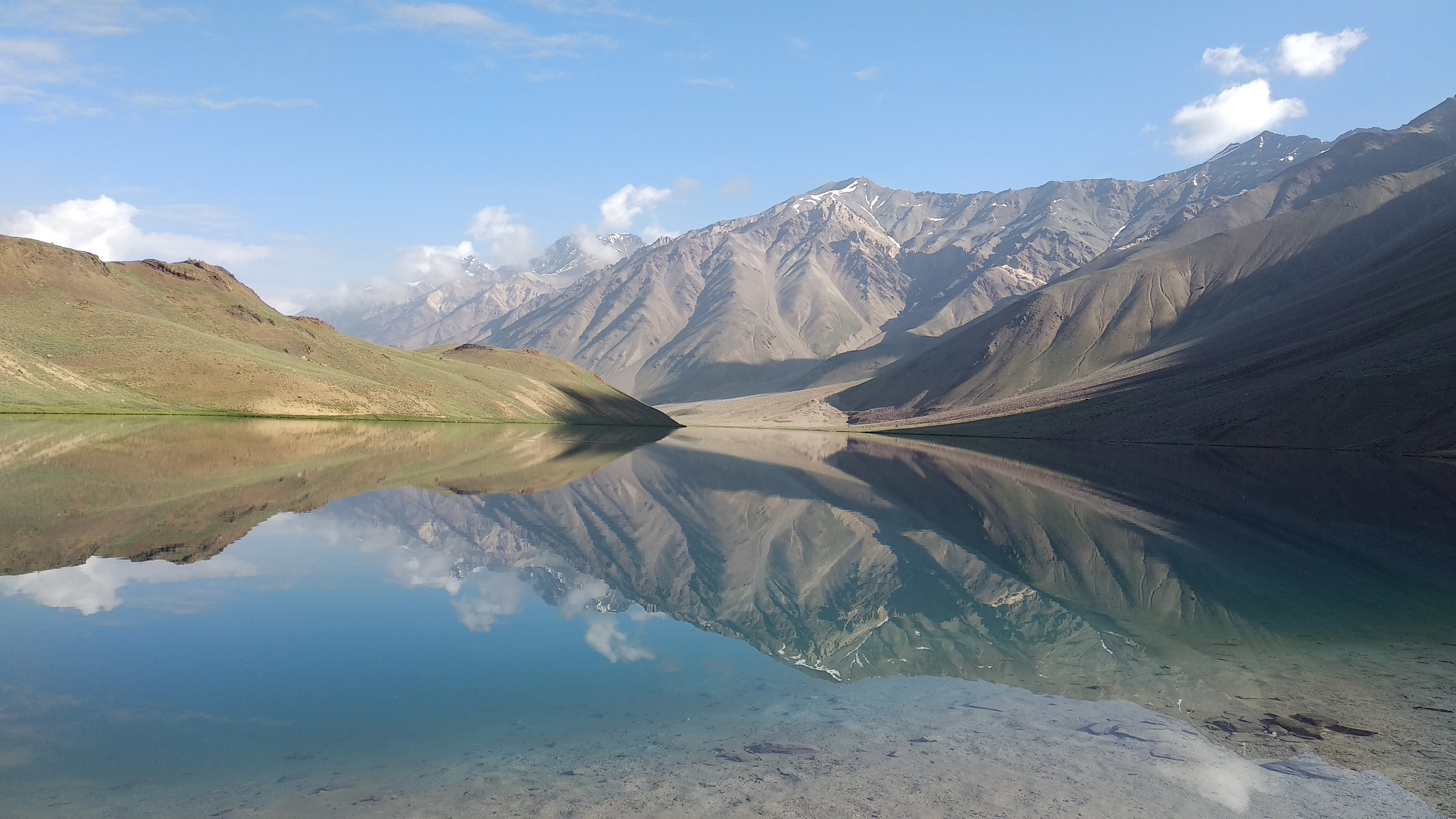
A view of the lake, Jul 2024

Chandra Taal Lake is on the Samudra Tapu plateau, which overlooks the Chandra River (a source river of the Chenab). The name of the lake originates from its crescent shape. It is at an altitude of about 4,300 metres (14,100 ft) in the Himalayas. Mountains of scree overlook the lake on one side, and a cirque encloses it on the other.

== Access ==
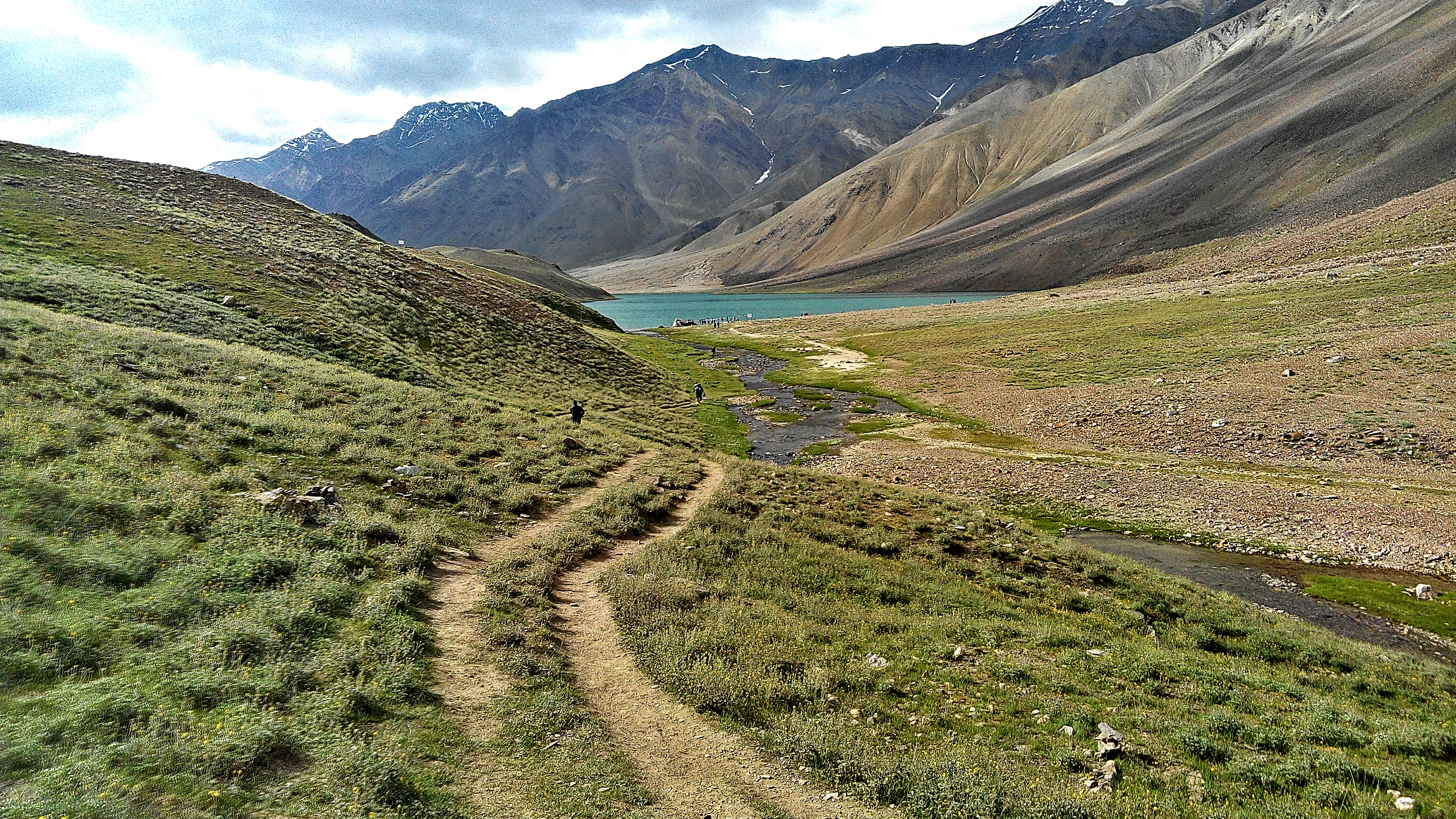
Foot path to Chandra Taal, Aug 2016

Chandra Taal is a tourist destination for trekkers and campers. The lake is accessible by road from Batal and by road as well as on foot from Kunzum Pass from late May to early October. The road to Chandra Taal branches off from NH-505 about 2.9 kilometres (1.8 mi) from Batal and 8 km (5.0 mi) from Kunzum Pass. This 12 km (7.5 mi) motor road runs as far as a parking lot 1 kilometre (0.62 mi) from the lake. One has to travel on foot for the final 1 km (0.62 mi). It takes approximately two hours from Kunzum Pass to Chandra Taal. Chandra Taal is also accessible from Suraj Tal, 30 km (19 mi) away.

== Fauna and flora ==
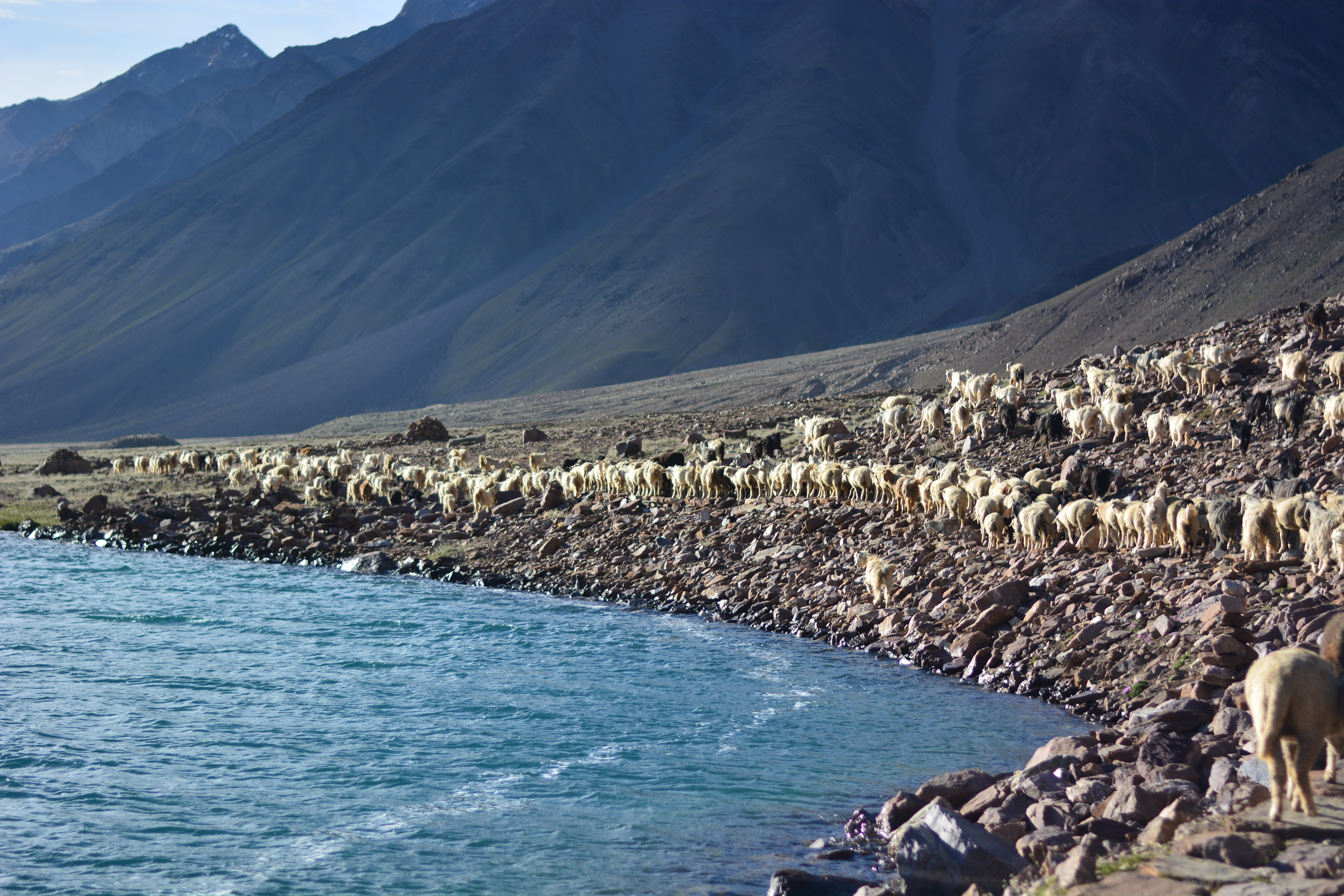
Herd of sheep passing the lake, Jul 2016

There are vast meadows on the banks of the lake. During springtime, these meadows are carpeted with hundreds of varieties of wild flowers. In 1871, Harcourt, Assistant Commissioner of Kullu, reported that there was a plain of good grass to the north of Chandra Taal, where shepherds brought large herds for grazing from Kullu and Kangra. Due to overgrazing, the grasslands are now degraded.

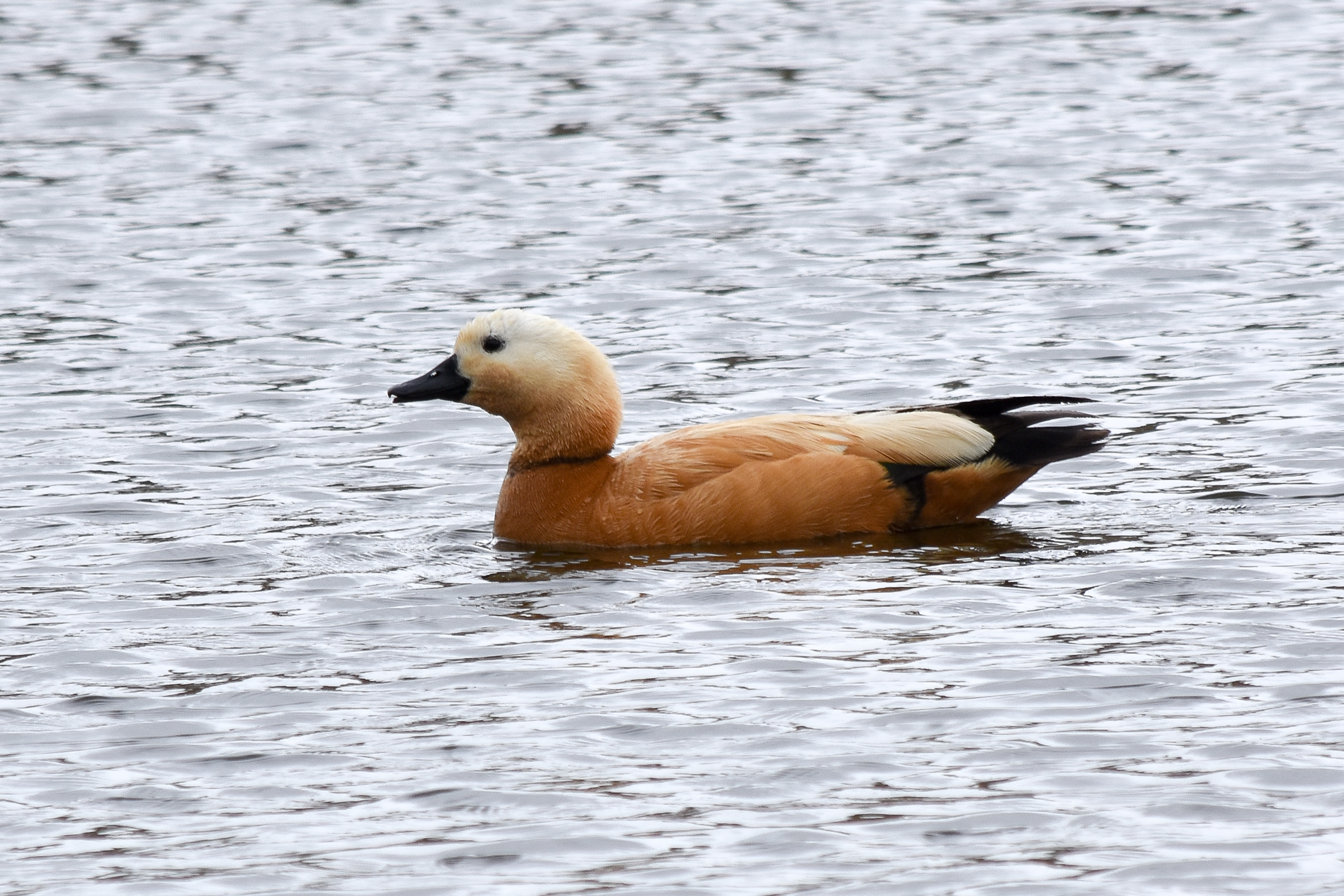
Ruddy (Brahminy) shelduck, Jun 2018

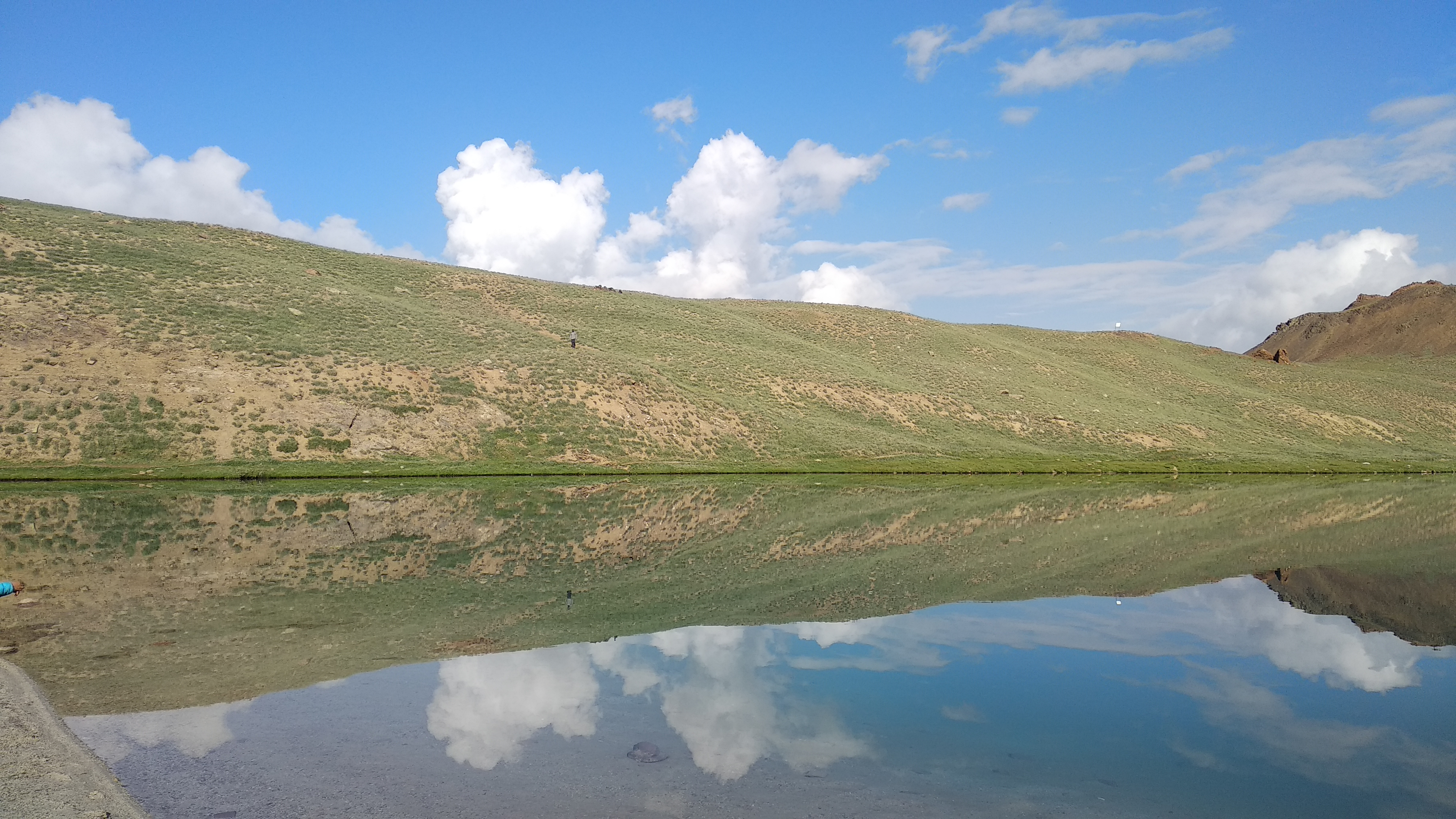
Vegetation around the lake, Jul 2024

Chandra Taal is home to a few species such as the Snow Leopard, Snow Cock, Chukor, Black Ring Stilt, Kestrel, Golden Eagle, Chough, Red Fox, Himalayan Ibex, and Blue Sheep. Over time, these species have adapted to the cold arid climate, intense radiation, and oxygen deficiency by developing special physiological features. Migratory species such as the Ruddy shelduck are found in summer.

== Other details ==
The lake is one of two high-altitude wetlands of India which have been designated as Ramsar sites.

== Gallery ==
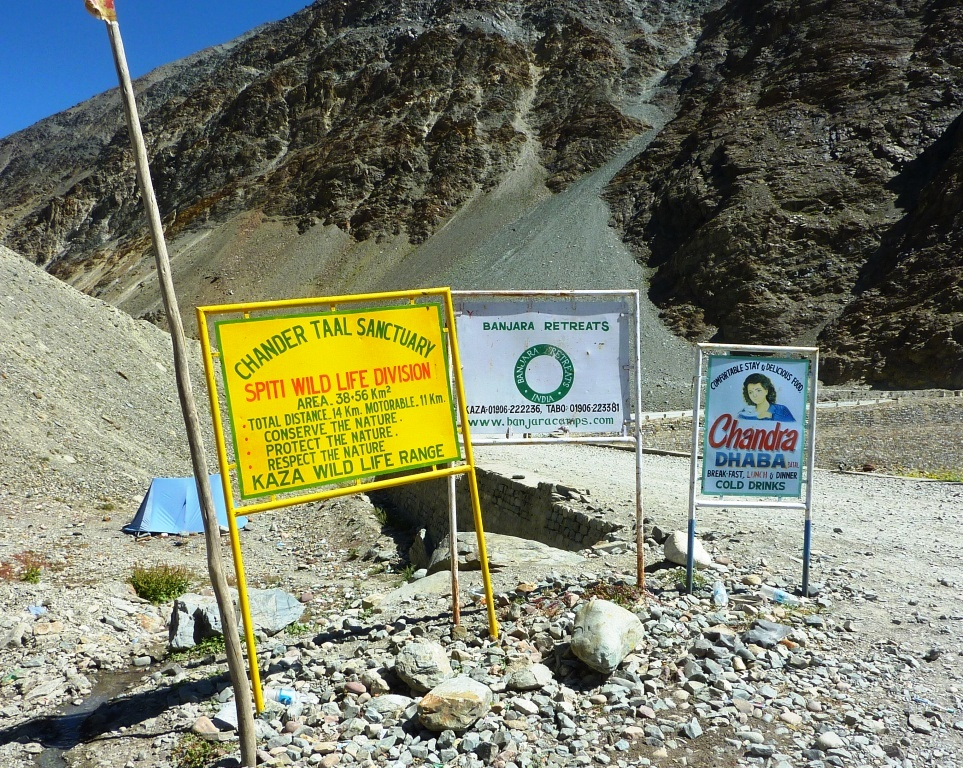
Chander Taal Wildlife Sanctuary sign. Lahaul & Spiti.

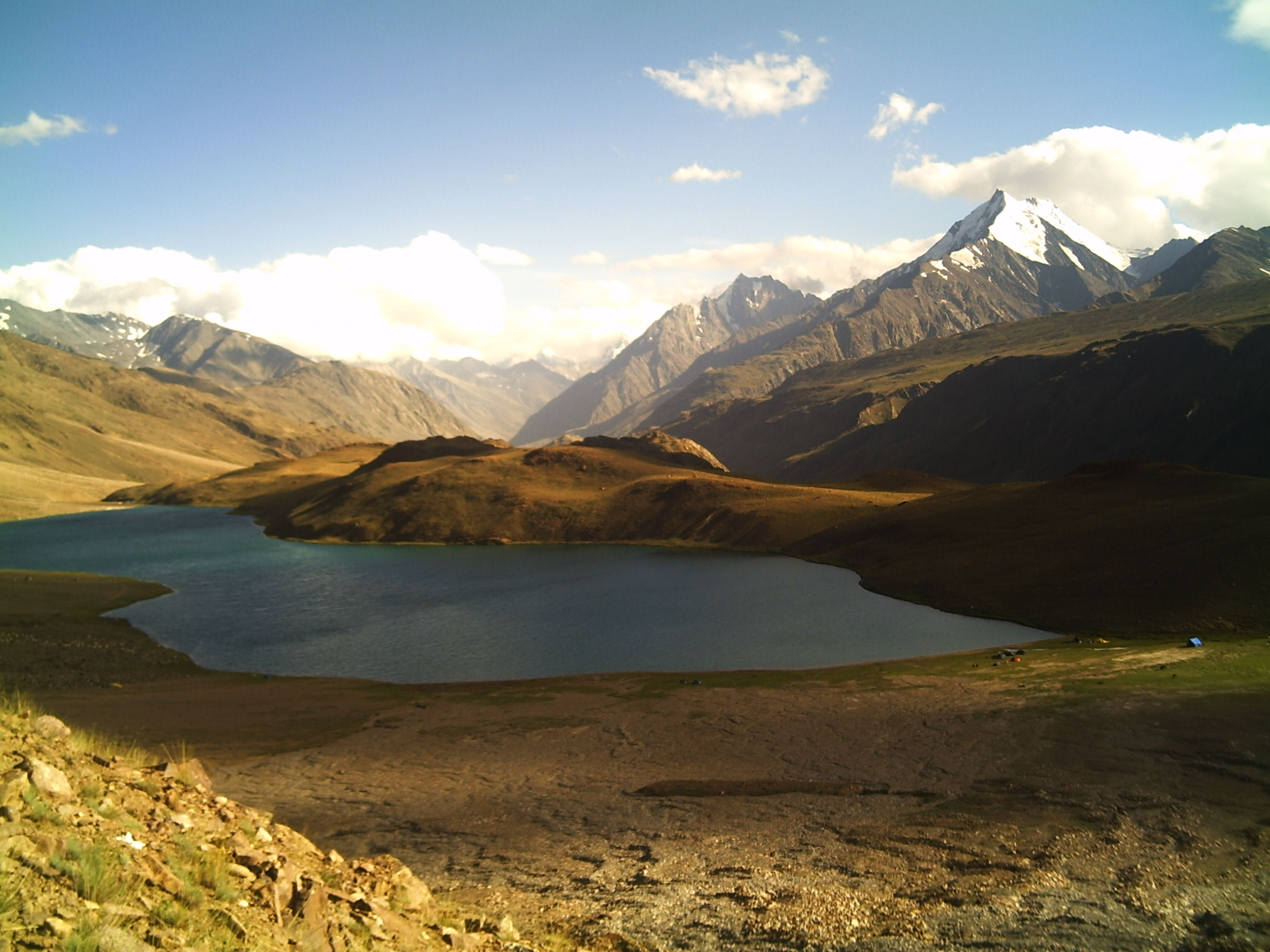
View of Chandra Taal, 2008

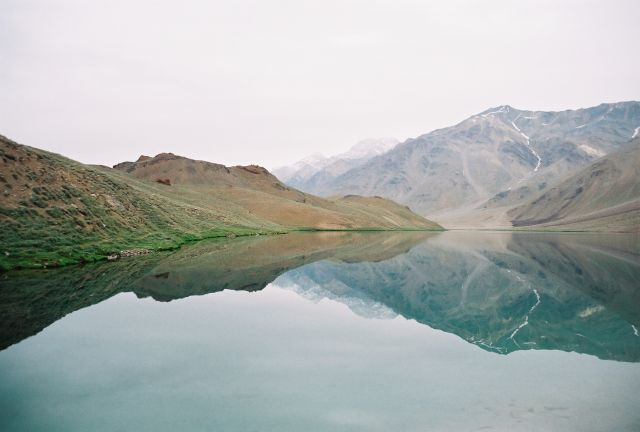
Chandra Taal

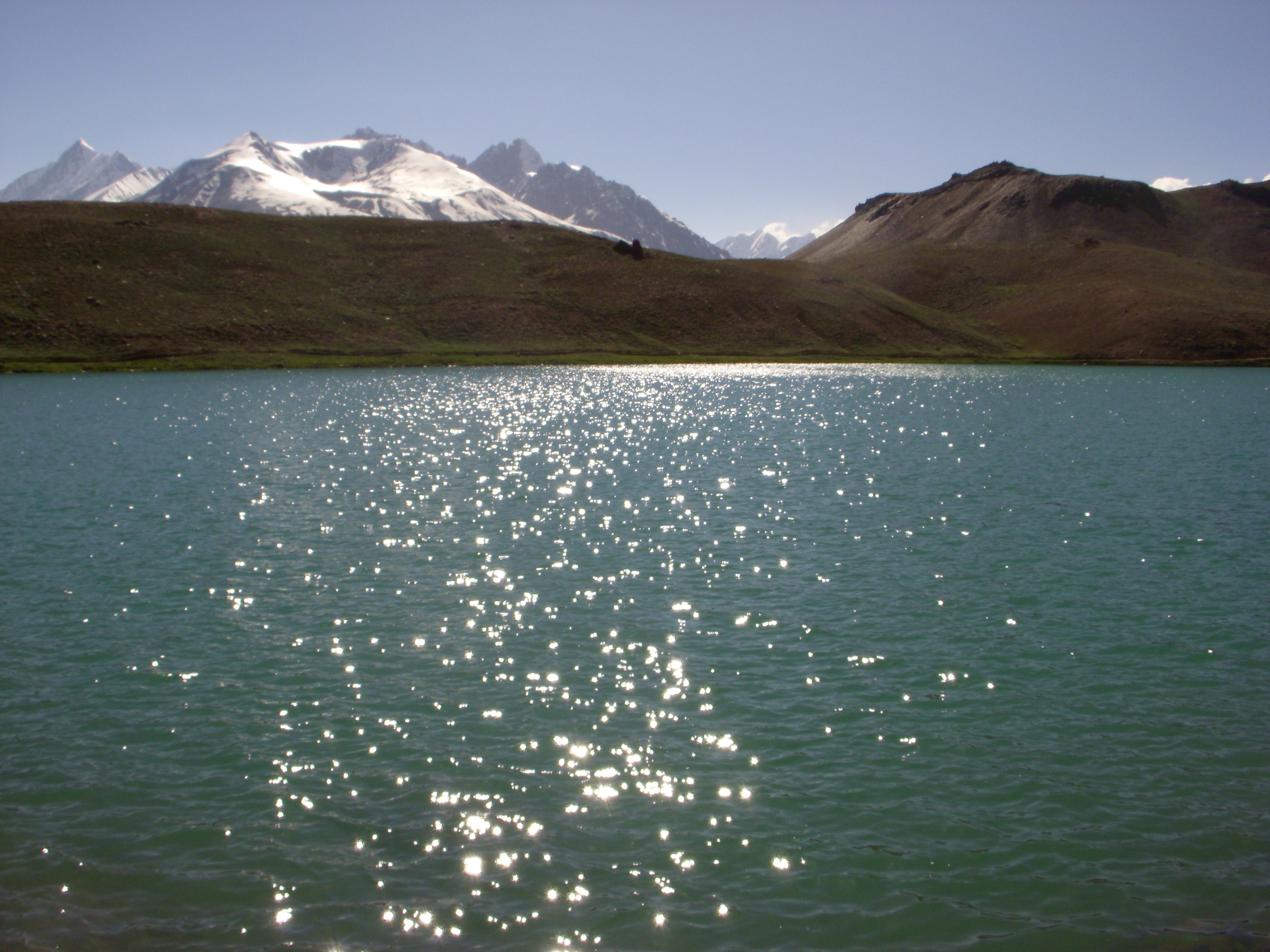
Chandra Taal reflecting evening sun

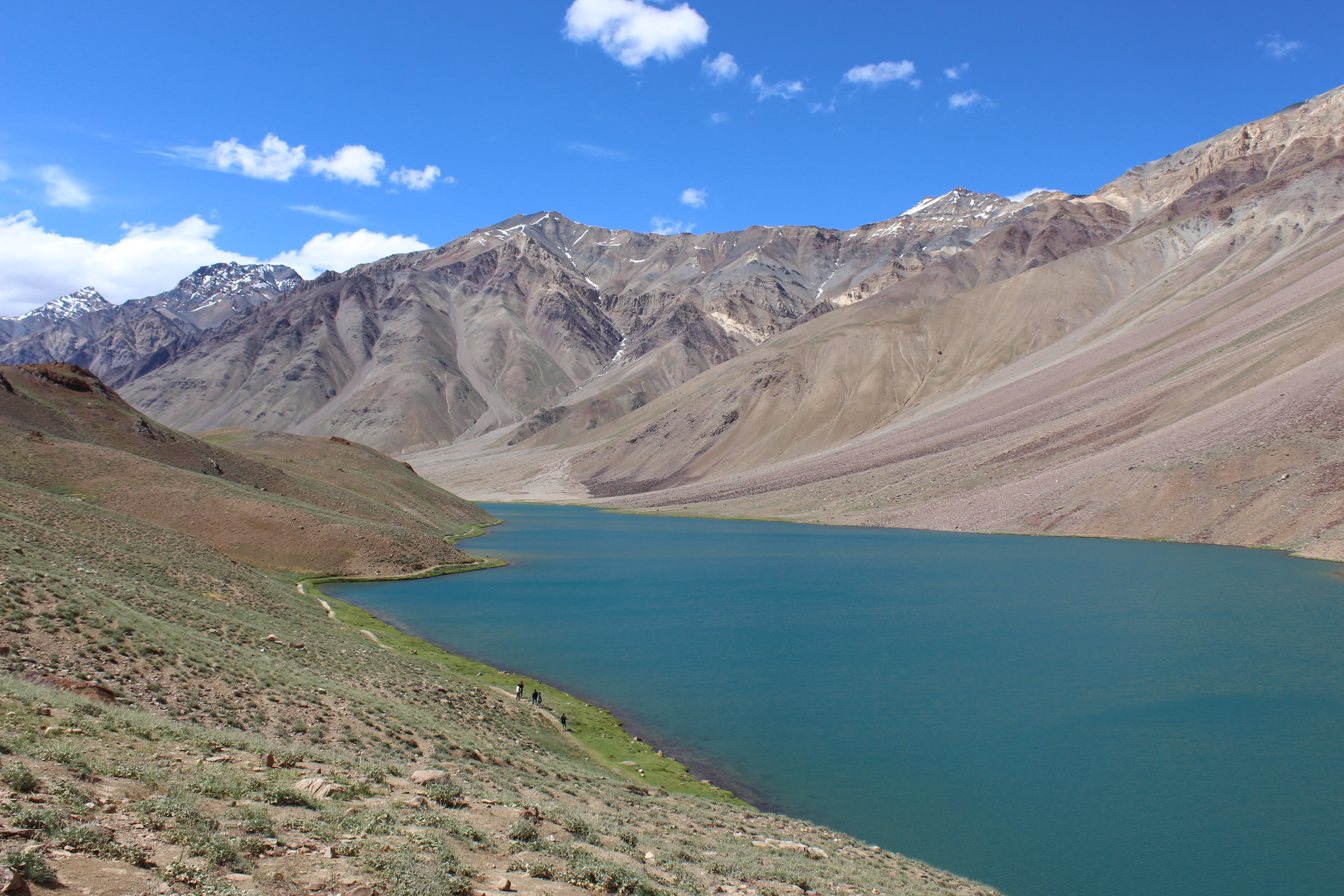
Footpath around the lake, Jul 2017

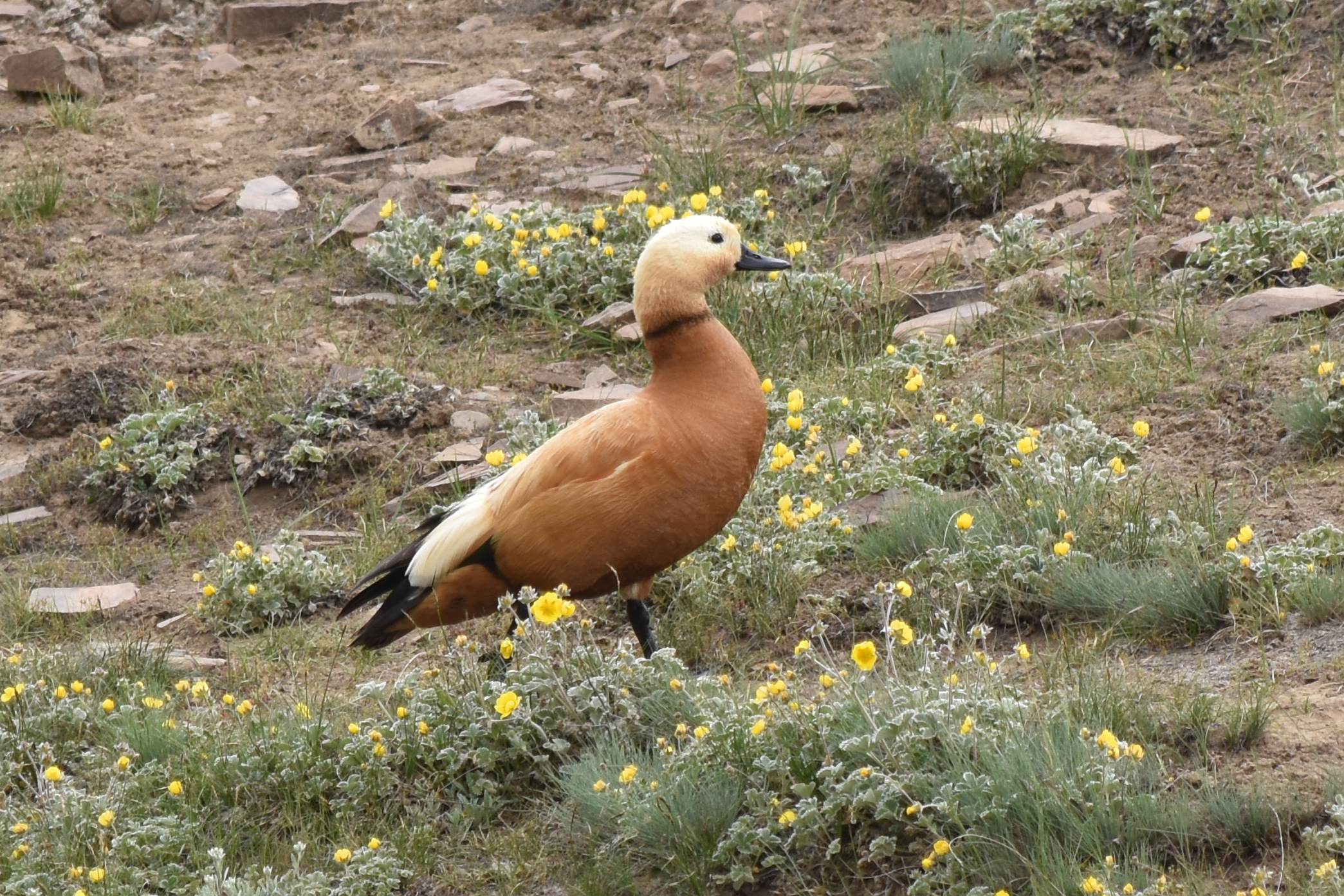
Ruddy shelduck & wildflowers, Jun 2018

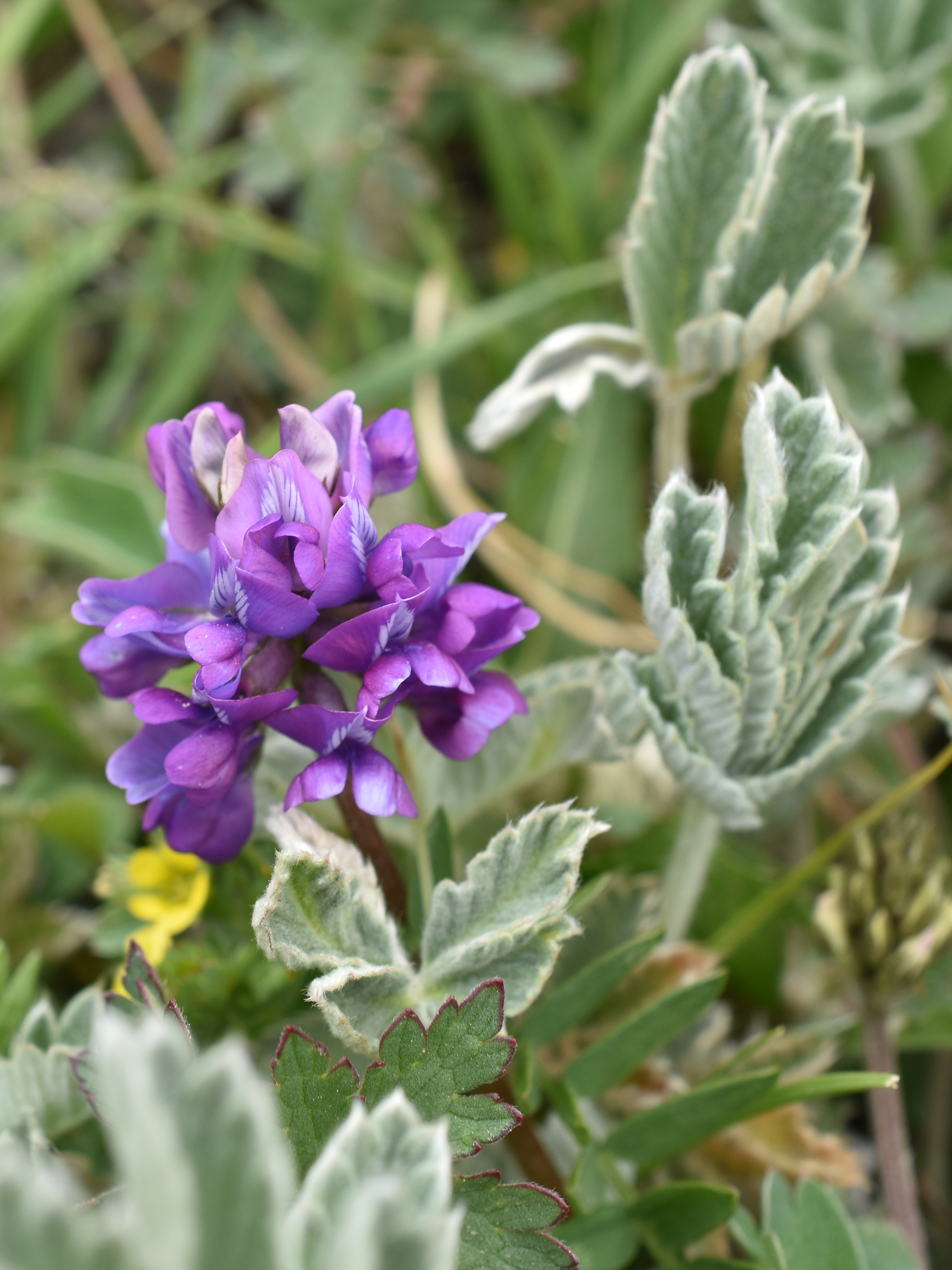
Wildflowers, Jun 2018

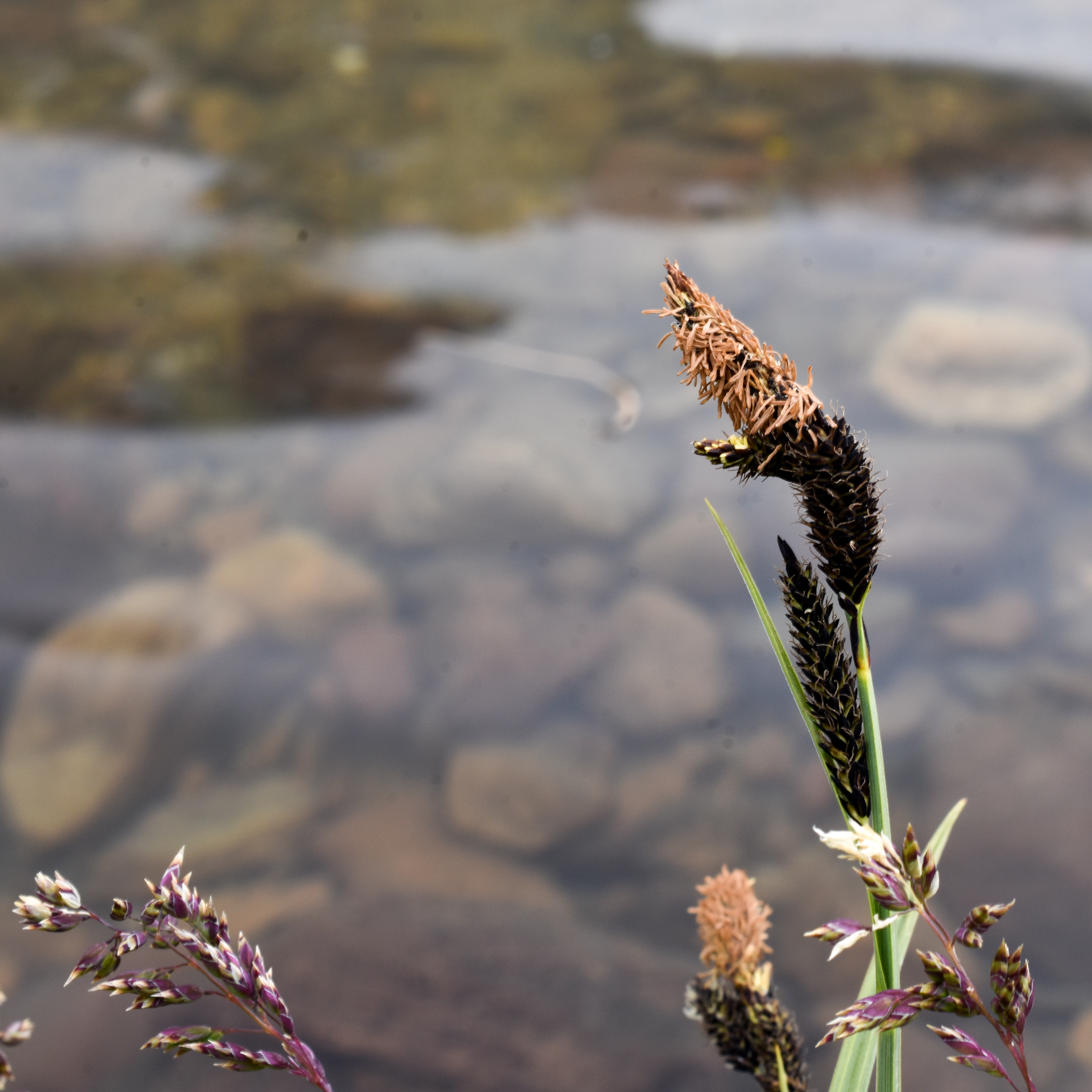
Grass flowers by the lake, Jun 2018
