= Amir Chand =

Indian physician (1889–1970)

Major General Amir Chand (1889–1970) was a physician and teacher of medicine in India. In 1936, while India was still under British rule, Dr. Amir Chand became the first Indian to occupy the Chair of Medicine at King Edward Medical College, Lahore. Post Indian independence, Dr. Amir Chand was prominent in laying the foundation of modern medicine in India. He was President of the Association of Physicians of India in 1947. In 1948, he was elected President of the Indian Medical Association. Maj Gen Amir Chand was also the founder of the Indian Society of Gastroenterology. In 1960, he was elected as the professional organization's first president.

Before he died, Amir Chand donated his savings to the Indian Council of Medical Research, the All-India Institute of Medical Sciences and the Armed Forces Medical Services. He used to say that all he had earned came from patients and, therefore, once his own needs and those of his dependents had been taken care of, the rest must be returned to the needy ailing humanity and the cause of medical education.

== Notes ==
1. Indian Council of Medical Research Colonel Amir Chand trust prizes for medical research
2. Indian Society of Gastroenterology
3. Indian Council of Medical Research
4. Post Graduate Institute, Chandigarh
5. The Hindu
6. Nobel laureate Sune Bergstrom's awards
