= T. K. Chand =

Indian mining veteran, executive and author

Dr. Tapan Kumar Chand
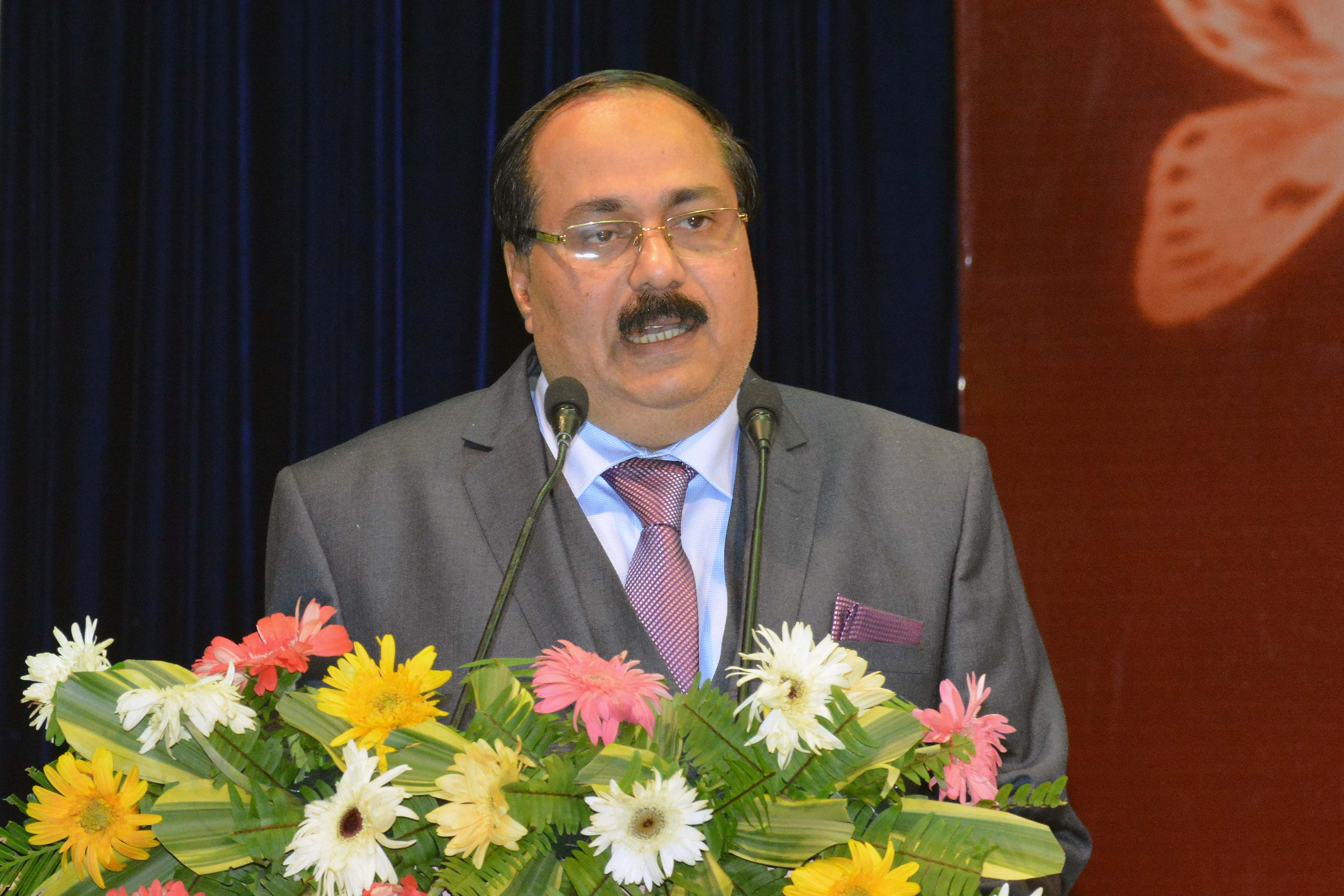
- Dr. T K Chand in August 2015
- Born: 17 November 1959 (age 66)
- Education: Queensland University of Technology; University of Calcutta; Utkal University; Andhra University
- Occupations: President, Vedanta Limited Resident Director of Vedanta Limited Former chairman and managing director of NALCO
- Years active: Since 1981
- Title: Ex Chairman and managing director, NALCO President, Aluminium Association of India; Chairman, Confederation of Indian Industry (CII)- Odisha State Council ex-director (C), RINL ex-director (P), CCL ex-director I/c (Sales & Marketing), CCL ex-chairman, CSI, Vizag ex-Chairman, CII, Vizag
- Political party: Bharatiya Janata Party
- Board member of: National Aluminium Company
- Spouse: Preeti Roy
- Children: Ananya Chand (daughter); Ankit Chand (son)
- Mother: Bishnu Priya Chand

Dr. Tapan Kumar Chand (born 17 November 1959) is an Indian mining veteran, executive, and author. He is the Resident Director of Vedanta Limited. He was the chairman cum managing director of National Aluminium Company. NALCO is the largest integrated aluminium unit in Asia and is also one of the largest aluminium complexes of the world. He has been in the mining and metal sector since 1982, earlier serving as the director commercial of Rashtriya Ispat Nigam Limited / Visakhapatnam Steel Plant and Director Personnel & Director I/c (Sales & Marketing), of Central Coalfields Limited.

== Early life and education ==
He holds a Bachelor of Arts in history and a master's degree in arts, public administration and history from Utkal University. He holds a bachelor's degree in law from Andhra University, Visakhapatnam, and a diploma in social welfare (labour welfare) from University of Calcutta.

He graduated as a gold medalist from Utkal University, Bhubaneswar. He was also the former student president at Utkal University in 1981. The Utkal University, awarded him the Honoris Causa D.Litt. for his contributions towards 'nation building', on the occasion of the university's 47th convocation.

He also holds Advanced Management degrees from International Center for Promotion of Enterprises, (ICPE), Slovenia and Queensland University of Technology, Australia.

== Career ==
After taking charge as chairman and managing director of National Aluminium Company on 27 July 2015, he asked his team to renegotiate contracts with the aim of reducing procurement costs by 20%, which would save Nalco nearly 100 crores. In addition, he was trying to convince the board to include mining in its vision plan. He also announced investments of $10 billion to be made for a number of projects, including a greenfield aluminium smelter abroad.

During his tenure in Rashtriya Ispat Nigam Limited, Vishakhapatnam Steel Plant, he had worked for various segments of the company and pioneer initiatives which have changed the way the firm works. Some of his initiatives include the introduction of a productive work culture, organizational restructuring, etc. in the field of HR. He won the Jawaharlal Nehru Award for outstanding performance as an executive for his initiatives and efforts to improve the organization. In 1983 he joined in as a management trainee in Rashtriya Ispat Nigam Limited, eventually becoming its director in 2010.

In 2007 he joined as the director (P) of Central Coalfields Limited. Here his focus remained in the field of HR and brought a paradigm shift. His efforts and initiatives in the areas of corporate social responsibility and welfare earned the company a good name and the membership of UN Global Compact. Exercising powers as a functional director, he has handled and decided all important matters of sales and marking – e-auction, forward e-auction, road sales, sales realization, coal linkage through LOA, etc. since joining.

== Political career ==
Dr. Chand joined the Bharatiya Janata Party in Odisha on 6 March 2024, the Bharatiya Janata Party, Odisha President, Manmohan Samal welcomed Dr. Chand to the State unit of the party.

== Bibliography ==
- Aluminium : The Future Metal

A book titled ‘Aluminium: The Future Metal’, authored by Nalco CMD Dr Tapan Kumar Chand was released by Union Mines Minister Narendra Singh Tomar in Indore in July 2019. The book, focussing on the entire value chain of the aluminium industry is the second one by Dr Chand named ‘Aluminium: The Strategic Metal’, which was highly acclaimed by the industry leaders and policymakers.

- Aluminium : The Strategic Metal

This book is aimed at promoting the strategic use of aluminium in all sectors. The author pressurises on the importance of using aluminium for green-cities and smart-cities. The book was also gifted to Narendra Modi, Prime Minister of India by the author at Raj Bhavan, Bhubaneswar.

== Honors ==
- ASSOCHAM Lifetime Achievement Award
- J Mathai National Fellowship Award, The Highest Management Award
- Honoris Causa D.Litt.
- India Gaurav Award
- Jawaharlal Nehru Award
- Corporate Governance Award
- Achievers of Odisha Award by The Times of India
