= Chandni Chowk Flyover =

Road junction in Punjab, Pakistan

- Interactive map of Chandni Chowk Flyover

Location
- Rawalpindi, Pakistan
- Coordinates: 33.630844507644206°N 73.07230454039046°E
- Roads at junction: Murree Road; Rawal Road

Construction
- Type: Flyover
- Lanes: 3 x 3
- Constructed: by NLC and Habib Construction Services
- Opened: 11 March 2012

Chandni Chowk Flyover is a flyover located in Rawalpindi in Punjab, Pakistan.

The construction of the flyover was started at a busy locality of Rawalpindi on 3 November 2011. Chandni Chowk is considered one of the most central locations of the city of Rawalpindi. On average, 128,900 vehicles pass through this junction daily, which causes traffic congestion issues, necessitating the flyover. The construction of the flyover at the junction ensures a smooth flow of traffic at the Murree Road and particularly at Chandni Chowk. The flyover was completed in 127 days at a cost of Rs. 1.25 billion.

The length of the flyover is 403 metres, and it has three lanes each side. On an average, 128,900 vehicles pass through this junction daily and the flyover was planned to help solve the traffic mess on Benazir Bhutto Road (Murree Road), particularly at Chandni Chowk, which had been a great concern for motorists, transporters and commuters.

It opened on 11 March 2012. Chandni Chowk is also famous due to food corner situated on its right side while entering from Islamabad

== Construction details ==
Type	Description
Construction cost	PKR 1.25 billion
Length	403 meters
Construction period	127 days
Owner	Communication and Works Department Govt. of Punjab
Consultant	Engineering Associates, Karachi
Contractor	NLC and Habib Construction Services

== See also ==
- Kalma Chowk Flyover
- Abdullah Gul Interchange
- Harbanspura Interchange
- Saggian Interchange, Lahore
- Lahore Ring Road
