= Chandu (opium) =

Smokable concentrated preparation of opium

Chandu is a rare concentrated preparation of opium which can be smoked. It is made by straining and boiling raw opium. Chandu was prepared for smoking in opium pipes in Asian regions, specifically China and India, in opium dens. The Chandu form of opium delivers the purest euphoric and strongest rush of opium. The dealers of Chandu used to adulterate it with the left-over ash which was morphine adding more numbing effect, although it is the morphine content in the opium which elevates pain relief and numbing properties. Chandu is usually vaporized in pipes where it is subjected to heat of a flame, leaving no residue.

Health hazards are discovered in users consuming it as it can impact the tolerance level of the extract every time it is subjected. Other health hazards are minimally researched pulmonary and lung disorders arising due to frequent use. Since the user is subjected to the neurological rush activating the pleasure circuits of the brain, it can be fatal in severe doses used to achieve the fix after a period of obsessive and compulsive need for the substance leading to an increasing level of addiction. The term chandu is believed to originate from the Malay language.
