= Chandrakala A. Hate =

Indian writer, feminist, social worker, and professor

Dr. Chandrakala Anandrao Hate
- Born: Chandrakala Jagannath Murkute; 1903
- Died: 1990 (aged 86–87)
- Education: M.A., Ph.D.

Chandrakala Anandrao Hate (pronounced Haa-tay) (1903–1990) (née Murkute) was a writer, feminist, social worker, and professor in Bombay, India.

== Biography ==
=== Early years ===
Born Chandrakala Jagannath Murkute on 12 September 1903 to Dr. Jagannath and Lahanibai Murkute, she was born into a family belonging to Mumbai's Daivadnya community. Education played an important role from early on in her life. She married Anandrao Ramkrishna Hate.

=== Career ===
Much of Dr. Hate's work entailed studying and improving the status of women in Indian society. She received an M.A. in Economics and wrote Hindu Woman and Her Future (1948) for her Ph.D. thesis in Sociology, advised by the influential sociologist Dr. G. S. Ghurye. Considered extremely forward-thinking at that time, the study advocated education of women as well increasing the acceptability of women in the work force.

She wrote the books Changing status of woman in post-independence India (1969) and Turn..? whither...? to....? (1978), and contributed often to the many English and Marathi Bombay magazines. Dr. Hate taught as a professor of sociology at SNDT Women's University, Bombay.

She began the organization Kutumb Sakhi in 1975 to help socially disadvantaged women employ themselves. Kutumb Sakhi initially began as a group of women stitching petticoats from cloth purchased from a mill owned by the cricketer Vijay Merchant. However, to improve revenue, the organization turned to cooking snack foods; over the years, the organization has become quite successful in the Mumbai eatery business, and in turn, has served a role in empowering many women take control of the own futures. As of 2011, the organization employed around 150 women, many of whom are widows or deserted wives.

=== Personal ===
Dr. Hate's husband died early in her life, and she raised three sons on her own, playing an important role in the way she viewed much of society. Much of her spiritual support came from the teachings of Gurudev R D Ranade. She died of esophageal cancer in Mumbai in 1990.

=== Legacy ===
In the years after her death, the city of Mumbai dedicated and renamed a chowk in Girgaum, South Mumbai, Chandrakalabai Hate Chowk in her honor.
