= Chandrakala Padia =

Indian academic and administrator

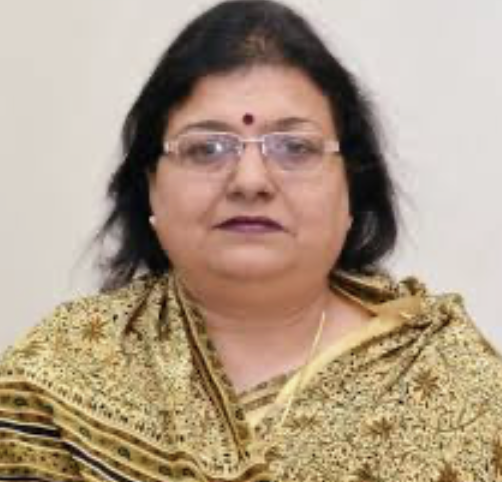
- Born: 29 May 1954 (age 72); India
- Occupations: Academic, University Administrator
- Known for: Chairperson of Indian Institute of Advanced Study (IIAS), Vice-Chancellor of MGSU Bikaner
- Relatives: Abhishek Chandra (Son), Vinita Chandra (daughter-in-law), Abhinav Padia (Son)

Academic background
- Education: Banaras Hindu University

Academic work
- Discipline: Political Science
- Institutions: Banaras Hindu University; Maharaja Ganga Singh University; Indian Institute of Advanced Study

Chandrakala Padia (born 1954) is a retired professor of Political Science from Banaras Hindu University. She has served as the Vice Chancellor of Maharaja Ganga Singh University, and as the first woman chairperson of Indian Institute of Advanced Study.

== Academic career ==
Padia was appointed vice chancellor of MGSU in November 2013 and the chairperson of IIAS in 2014. She has been a Fulbright scholar. Padia's appointments to prominent academic positions, including her appointment as chairperson of the Indian Institute of Advanced Study (IIAS), have been associated with her relations with former MHRD minister Smriti Irani.

== Controversies ==
In 2015, Vice-Chancellor Chandrakala Padia of Maharaja Ganga Singh University (MGSU), Bikaner, was at the center of a controversy over allegations of political favoritism and procedural violations during the appointment of 11 associate professors. Board members accused Padia of bypassing standard norms, showing bias, and acting unilaterally—most notably by opening sealed appointment envelopes without consensus. After facing objections and chaos in a board meeting, Padia offered her resignation to the Governor, only to return following his assurance of support. Her defense—that she had never been politically inclined—rang hollow for many, especially as insiders suggested she sidelined other members to push her preferred candidates.

In 2015, Suneel Verma, the Secretary of the Indian Institute of Advanced Study (IIAS), resigned from his position following a standoff with Chairperson Chandrakala Padia. Days before his resignation, Verma had on 16 July written to the IIAS director Pof Chetan Singh, complaining against the "authoritarian, prejudiced, biased and irrational attitude" of the chairperson, raising of issues which are "very petty and personal in nature and have nothing to do with the betterment of the Institute" and involving issues like the "non functioning of telephones at the Delhi Camp office and regarding the inconvenience caused to her guests, particularly her daughter-in-law who felt humiliated because of telephones were not functioning at the Delhi Camp Office accommodation". In her defense, Padia claimed that she is being targeted for being a women, and because she challenged the patriarchal networks of Power
