= Chanda Bwalya =

Zambian football player

Senior career*
Years	Team	Apps	(Gls)
- Terengganu FC

International career
- Zambia MNT
- * Club domestic league appearances and goals

Chanda Bwalya is a Zambian football player. He formerly played for Terengganu FA in Malaysia. He is also a former Zambia national football team player.
