= Ambrish Chandra =

Ambrish Chandra is an electrical engineer at the Ecole de Technologie Superiere in Montreal, Quebec. Chandra was named a Fellow of the Institute of Electrical and Electronics Engineers (IEEE) in 2014 for his contributions to electric power distribution and renewable energy systems.

== Introduction ==
Ambrish Chandra received B.E. degree from the University of Roorkee (presently IITR), India, M. Tech. from IIT Delhi, and Ph.D. from University of Calgary, Canada, in 1977, 1980, and 1987, respectively, all in electrical power area. He has been a full professor of electrical engineering with the École de Technologie Supérieure (ÉTS), Montréal, QC, Canada, since 1999. Before joining ÉTS as an associate professor in 1994, he worked as a faculty member at IIT Roorkee. From 2012 to 2015, he was the director of multidisciplinary graduate program on Renewable Energy and Energy Efficiency with ÉTS. He is currently the director of master program in electrical engineering.

Chandra's most distinctive work is related to the advancement of new theory and control algorithms for power electronics converters in the following two areas: 1) power quality improvement in distribution systems, and 2) integration of renewable energy sources to distribution systems with improved power quality features. His work has had a significant impact and is now extensively referred by engineers and researchers around the world, as evident by total Google citations more than 20 000, h-index 54, and i10-index 258. Prof. Chandra, being a Distinguished Lecturer of IEEE Power and Energy Society (2015-2020), as well as Distinguished/Prominent Lecturer of IEEE Industry Applications Society (2017-2021) on ‘Power-Quality and Renewable-Energy’, is invited around the world to deliver distinguished lectures. He has already delivered lectures/keynote speeches in many countries.

He is co-author of John Wiley book ‘Power Quality – Problems and Mitigation Techniques’. He is also a co-author of three book chapters. He is Fellow of many organizations, including IEEE, Canadian Academy of Engineering, Engineering Institute of Canada, Institute of Engineering and Technology - U.K., IE (India), IETE (India), and registered as a Professional Engineer in the province of Quebec, Canada. He is the recipient of ‘IEEE Canada P. Ziogas Electric Power Award 2018’ and ‘IEEE Power and Energy Society Nari Hingorani Custom Power Award 2021’.
