= Thacholi Chandu =

Thacholi Chandu was a warrior and a legendary hero who is believed to have lived during 17 th century in North Malabar region of Kerala, India. He belonged to the Thacholi family of Nair community. Chandu was married to Thayattu Madathu Mattu Kutti. He is praised about in Vadakkan Pattukal (ballads of North Malabar). He is the nephew of legendary Thacholi Othenan.

== Story of Thulunadan fort ==
Kandar Menon was the owner of the Thulunadan fort. Kandar Menon was an expert in martial arts. No one could conquer his fort because he had one lakh soldiers and 17,789 weapons. Even the legendary Thacholi Othenan could not conquer the Thulunadan fort. One day Chandu's wife Mattu Kutty was going to the Omaloor Kavu temple. Kandar Menon saw her beauty and kidnapped her. Chandu heard this news and disguised as a sage and went to the fort. Kandar Menon was kind to sages and let him in. At the night he managed killed all the soldiers. When Kandar Menon got up, he saw blood shed. Chandu came in his original form and set a angam (war) with Kandar Menon. Chandu used ullivettu to kill Kandar Menon.

== Chandus in Vattakan pattu ==
There are three persons (characters) named Chandu in Vadakkan Pattukal. They are Chandu Chekavar (Chadiyan Chandu), Payyampally Chandu Chekavar, and Thacholi Chandu.

== Popular culture ==
Thacholi Chandu's character has been depicted in several Malayalam films, including Thacholi Marumakan Chandu and Thacholi Othenan. The movie Thacholi Marumakan Chandu, directed by P. Bhaskaran, was about the life of Thacholi Chandu.
