= Chanda Jog =

Indian astrophysicist

Chanda Jayant Jog
- Born: 7 November 1954 (age 71)
- Education: Stony Brook University
- Spouse: Aloke Jain
- Scientific career
- Fields: Astrophysics
- Workplaces: IISc

Chanda Jayanth Jog (born 7 November 1954) is an Indian astrophysicist working at the Indian Institute of Science, Bangalore. Her study specializes in Galactic Dynamics, Interacting & Star Burst Galaxies and Interstellar Molecular Clouds. She has published around 85 articles surrounding galaxies and galactic dynamics.

== Early life ==
Dr Chanda Jayanth Jog spent a part of her childhood at Kalwe in Maharashtra. Her father was an Electrical Engineer.

== Career ==
After her Doctoral Studies from Stony Brook University. She worked as a post doctoral fellow at Princeton and as professor in Virginia. She returned to India in 1987, where she continued her work at Indian Institute of Science. Her work has been in the area of star-gas instabilities and vertical-disk dynamics in galaxies, triggering of starbursts by shock compression of gas, lopsided galaxies, and the dynamics of interacting galaxies.

== Awards and honours ==
- Prof. S. K. Chatterjee Award of IISc (2012)
- Elected Fellow of the National Academy of Sciences, Allahabad (2011)
- Elected Fellow of the Indian Academy of Sciences, Bangalore (2007)
