= Tara Chand (Himachal Pradesh politician) =

Indian politician

Tara Chand was an Indian politician. He was elected to the Himachal Pradesh Territorial Council in 1962, from the Jogindernagar constituency. He was the sole Communist Party of India (CPI) candidate elected to the council (which was converted into the Himachal Pradesh Legislative Assembly). When CPI split in 1964 Tarachand sided with the Communist Party of India (Marxist), become a leading figure of CPI(M) in Himachal Pradesh. He was elected secretary of the CPI(M) Himachal Pradesh State Committee in 1978. He served as president of the Himachal Pradesh Kisan Sabha.

Tara Chand died in the late 1990s.
