= Chandi (disambiguation) =

Chandi is a Hindu goddess.

Chandi, or Chandee, may also refer to:

== Places ==
- Chandi, Thailand, a town in Thailand
- Chandi, Bihar, a town in India
- Chandi, Brahmanbaria, a village in Bangladesh
- Kot Chandi, a village in Pakistan
- Chandi Devi Temple, Haridwar, Uttarakhand, India
- Chandigarh or Chandi Garh, a union territory of India, meaning Chandi Fort (in reference to Chandi Mandir)
- Changdi, also known as Chandi, a mountain on Nepal/China border

== Other uses ==
- Chandi (name), includes a list of people with the name
- Candi of Indonesia, a type of Hindu/Buddhist temple of Indonesia
- Chandee, a 2013 Indian film

== See also ==
- Candi (disambiguation)
- Chanda (disambiguation)
- Chand (disambiguation)
- Chandni (disambiguation)
- Chandrika (disambiguation)
- Chandipur (disambiguation)
- Chandika (disambiguation)
