= Bismil Saeedi =

Indian Urdu poet (1901–1977)

- Born: Eesa Ahmed; 1901; Tonk, India
- Died: 1977 (aged 75–76); Delhi, India
- Occupations: Poet, Journalist
- Known for: Ghazals

Bismil Saeedi (1901–1977) (بسمل سعیدی), hailing from Tonk, India was an Urdu poet who mainly wrote ghazals.

Bismil Saeedi who had settled in Delhi died in Delhi on 26 September 1977.

== Literary life ==
The Urdu poets of Tonk preferred the style and mannerism of Momin to that of Ghalib. A master of classic diction Bismil Saeedi wrote mainly ghazals. He was a recipient of Ghalib Award and Nehru Award.

A collection of his ghazals titled Auraq e Zindagi was published by P.K.Publications in the year 1971. And, another collection of his ghazals, selected and compiled by Makhmoor Saeedi, titled Intikhab e kalam e Bismil Saidi was published by the Urdu Akadmi, Delhi. In 2007 his complete works titled Kulliyat e Bismil Saeedi were published by the Sahitya Akademi. His other poetical works are Mushhidat, Kaif e Alam and Nishat e gham.

In 2011, Rashtrasant Tukadoji Maharaj Nagpur University awarded the Ph.D. Degree to Sabiha Kausar Badruddin Ansari on her doctoral dissertation – "Bismil Saeedi – Hayat aur Shairi" (Bismil Saeedi – Life and poetry). A detailed appraisal of his life and works titled Bismil Saeedi-shakhs aur shair compiled jointly by Gopal Mittal, Makhmoor Saeedi and Prem Gopal Mittal was published by Nishanil Akademi, New Delhi, in 1976. Zia Fatehabadi, also a disciple of Seemab Akbarabadi, had through his 1975 nazm, Bismil e ghazal, eulogised his senior whose takhallus, Bismil, means, "the wounded".

== Bibliography ==
- Auraq e zindagi
- Intikhab e kalam e Bismil Saeedi
- Kulliyat e Bismil Saeedi
- Mushhidat
- Kaif e Alam
- Nishat e gham
