= Chandpur =

Chandpur may refer to:

== Bangladesh ==
- Chandpur District, a district in Chittagong Division, Bangladesh
  - Chandpur Sadar Upazila
  - Chandpur, Bangladesh, a city and district headquarters
- Chandpur, a model village in Senbagh Upazila, Noakhali District, Bangladesh

== India ==
- Chandpur, Bhopal, a village in Madhya Pradesh
- Chandpur, Bijnor, a town in Uttar Pradesh
  - Chandpur (Assembly constituency), a constituency of the Uttar Pradesh Legislative Assembly
- Chandpur, Ghola, a census town in North 24 Parganas district, West Bengal
- Chandpur, Hailakandi, a village in Assam
- Chandpur, Mandirbazar, a census town in South 24 Parganas district, West Bengal
- Chandpur, Malda, a gram panchayat and village in West Bengal
- Chandpur, Rajasthan, a village in Mundawar tehsil, Alwar district

== See also ==
- Chandpuri, an Indian surname
- Chanthaburi (disambiguation)
- Chand (disambiguation)
- Chandipur (disambiguation)
- Chandrapur (disambiguation)
