= Chandpuri =

Chandpuri is an Indian toponymic surname for people from Chandpur, Bijnor, in Uttar Pradesh or other places named Chandpur. It may refer to:

- Kausar Chandpuri (1900–1990), Indian physician and writer
- Kuldip Singh Chandpuri (born 1940), Indian military officer
- Qayem Chandpuri (1722–1793), Indian poet
- Raaz Chandpuri (1892–1969), Urdu writer and literary critic
