= Krishan Mohan =

Indian Urdu poet (1922–2004)

- Born: Krishan Lal Bhatia; 1922; Sialkot, British India
- Died: 2004 (aged 81–82); Delhi, India
- Occupations: Government Service, Poet
- Known for: Ghazals and Nazms

Krishan Mohan, born Krishan Lal Bhatia (28 November 1922 – 2004) was an Indian Urdu poet who gained prominence after India gained independence from the British Raj.

== Early life ==
Mohan was the takhallus (penname) of Krishan Lal Bhatia who was born in Sialkot, British India. His father, Ganpat Rai Bhatia, was an advocate; post partition of British India he practiced law in the District Courts of Meerut. Ganpat Rai was also an Urdu poet; his takhallus was Shakir.

After completing his school studies Mohan obtained his B.A. (Hons.) degrees separately in English and in Persian as a student of Murray College, Sialkot, where he was also the editor of the college house magazine. Later on he obtained his M.A. degree in English Literature as a student of Government College, Lahore.

After partition of British India his family moved to Karnal where Mohan found temporary employment as a welfare officer. Thereafter, he worked as sub-editor and assistant editor of All India Radio's publication Aawaaz at Lucknow and Delhi, and then as a journalist with the Press Information Bureau before joining the Indian Revenue Service as an Income Tax Officer.

== Literary life ==
Mohan was a prolific writer who, after 1947, appeared at Delhi’s Urdu stage which was graced by stalwarts – Pandit Harichand Akhtar, Arsh Malsiani, Jagan Nath Azad, Gopal Mittal, Naresh Kumar Shad, Bismil Saeedi, Rana Jaggi, Ram Krishan Mushtar, Talib Chakwali and Bakshi Akhtar Amritsari.

While adhering to the classical style Krishan Mohan did not hesitate to experiment, at times over- reaching the thresholds of imagination and thought. His ghazals set in the traditional mode are thoughtful and thought-provoking, and for his nazms he searched for and found new ideas and expressions.

== Bibliography ==
Urdu poetry (in Urdu script):

- Shabnam shabnam
- Dil e Naadaan
- Tamaashaaii
- Ghazaal
- Nigaah e naaz
- Aahang e watan
- Konpal konpal
- Bairaagii bhanwaraa
- Shirazah e mizgaan

Urdu poetry (in Hindi script):

- Roopras
- Dhoop meri kaamnaa ki
- Pyaas meri kaamnaa ki

== Personal life ==
Mohan died in Delhi, aged 82 years. His children are Meera Bhatia, Neera Bhatia and Rohit Bhatia. Meera Bhatia is an advocate and works on cases in supreme court and high court and was standing counsel criminal for Delhi, Haryana and Senior Counsel UOI. She has done LLB from Delhi University. Neera Bhatia was a senior teacher at DPS RK.PURAM New Delhi, she was a PGT teacher. She obtained her master's degree from Delhi University. Rohit Bhatia is his son. Mohan’s grandchildren are Abhinav Kalra, Vishakha Bhatia, Abhimanyu Kalra and Anandit Thakur.
