= Chandrapur (disambiguation) =

Chandrapur ('moon city') may refer to the following places in India:

- Chandrapur, a city and headquarters of Chandrapur district, Maharashtra
  - Chandrapur district, a district in Nagpur Division, Maharashtra
  - Chandrapur Airport
- Chandrapur, Ahmednagar, a village in Ahmednagar district, Maharashtra
- Chandrapur, Bagnan I, a census town in Howrah district, West Bengal
- Chandrapur, Bardhaman, a village in Bardhaman district, West Bengal
- Chandrapur, Birbhum, a village in Birbhum district, West Bengal
- Chandrapur, Guwahati, a neighbourhood of Guwahati, Assam, India
- Chandrapur, West Bengal, a census town in North 24 Parganas district, West Bengal

== See also ==
- Chandra (disambiguation)
- Chandpur (disambiguation)
- Chandrapur Assembly Constituency (disambiguation)
- Chandrapore, a fictional town in E. M. Forster's 1924 novel A Passage to India
- Chandrapura, town in Jharkhand, India
- Chandrapura, Buxar, Bihar, village in Bihar, India
- Chandrapuram, village in Tamil Nadu, India
