= Kaqur Kangri =

Mountain in Nepal/China

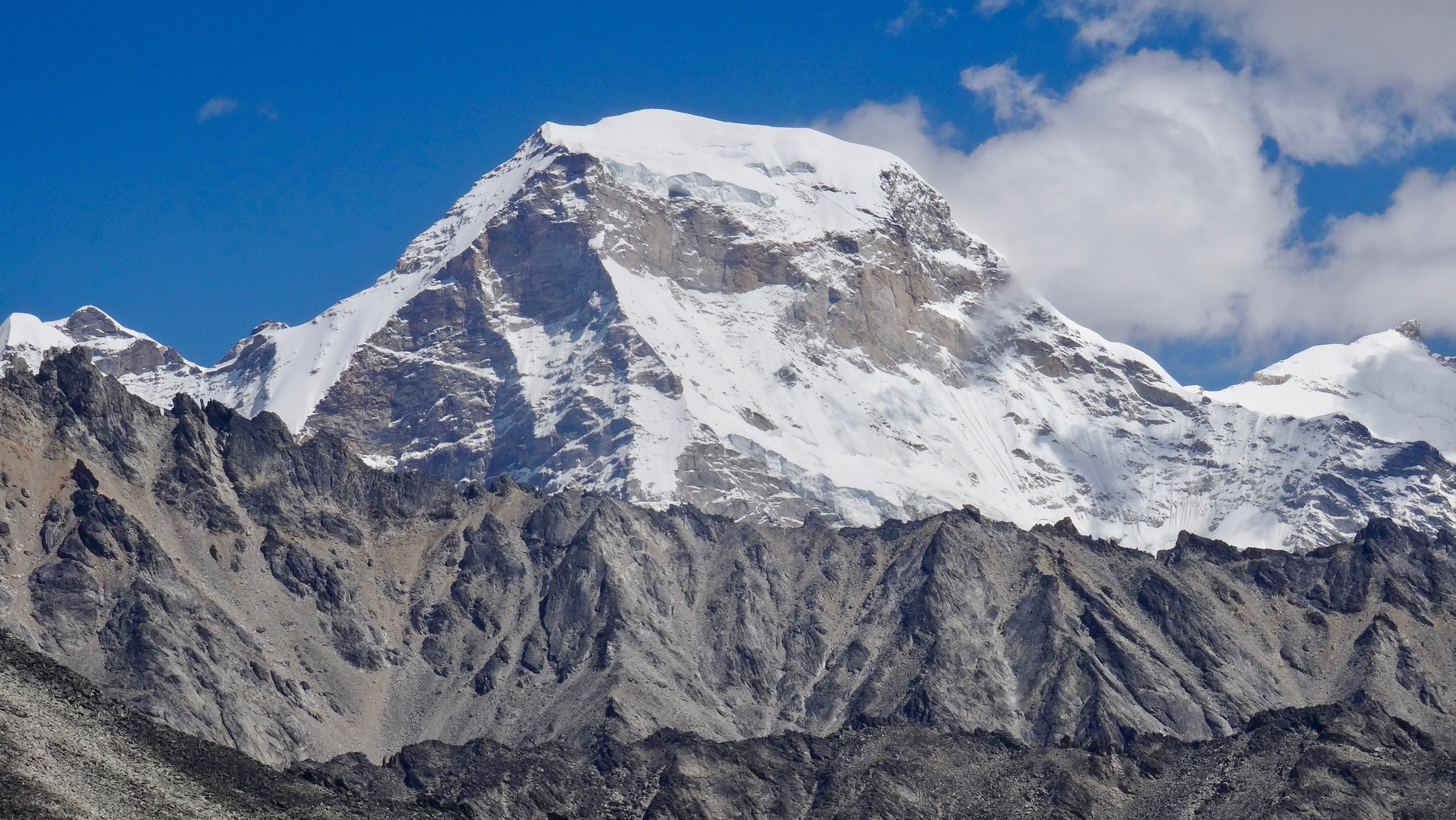
- South aspect of Kaqur Kangri

Highest point
- Elevation: 6,859 m (22,503 ft)
- Prominence: 1,699 m (5,574 ft)
- Isolation: 44.61 km (27.72 mi)
- Listing: Ultras of the Himalayas
- Coordinates: 29°45′57″N 82°45′06″E

Geography
- Location within Nepal
- Interactive map of Kaqur Kangri
- Location: China–Nepal border
- Countries: Nepal and China
- Province: Karnali Province and Tibet Autonomous Region
- Protected area: Shey Phoksundo National Park
- Parent range: Himalayas

Climbing
- First ascent: 2002

Kaqur Kangri (Note: Also known as Kubi Kangri, Kanti Himal, Zazi Kangri, and Ronglai Kangri.) is a mountain in the Kanti Himal subrange of the Himalayas. It is located on the China-Nepal border, and has a summit elevation of 6,859 metres (22,503 ft).

== Names ==
Kaqur Kangri is commonly used to describe the mountain and the word 'Kaqur' originated from the Kaqur school of Tibetan Buddhism established by Milarepa. It is also known as Kubi Kangri in Nepal, while the name is also used to represent the Changla peak. In Tibet, it is also known as Zazi Kangri. The peak is also known as Kanti Himal in Nepal and Ronglai Kangri in Tibet after the mountain range itself. A separate peak known as Ronglai Kangri also exists approximately 12 km (7.5 mi) northwest of Kaqur Kangri.

== Geography ==
Kaqur Kangri is located on the China-Nepal border in the western Himalayas. It is located in Mugu District, Nepal, and the Tibet Autonomous Region in China. It is located on the northern edge of the Shey Phoksundo National Park, in the headwater area of the Brahmaputra River (Yarlung Tsangpo).

It is part of the Kanti Himal or Ronglai Kangri range. The range is about 40 km (25 mi) wide and stretches from Pakyunghangmu and Dhaulagiri in the east to Gorakh Himal and Changla Himal in the west. The range consists of several peaks of elevation greater than 6,000 m (20,000 ft), of which the Kaqur Kangri is the highest at 6,859 m (22,503 ft).

== Exploration and mountaineering ==
The first recorded foreign visitor to the region was the Japanese Buddhist monk Ekai Kawaguchi, who travelled through the area in 1900 during his journey from Nepal to Tibet In 1907, Swedish explorer Sven Hedin made a sketch of Kaqur Kangri.

The mountain was subsequently observed by a climbing team from the Doshisha University Alpine Club during their ascent of Saipal in 1963. In 1997, when a team from the Osaka Alpine Club, led by Sadao Yoshinaga, climbed Rongla Kangri at 6,799 m (22,306 ft), they conducted a reconnaissance of Kaqur Kangri. In 1998, a Japanese expedition led by Yoshiharu Suita of the Doshisha University Alpine Club attempted to climb the mountain via its northeastern ridge and reached an elevation of approximately 6,450 m (21,160 ft). Another Japanese expedition led by Sadao Yoshinaga approached the peak from the southern side and surveyed climbing routes.

The first ascent of Kaqur Kangri was made in September 2002 by five members of the Doshisha University Alpine Club. The team consisting of Katsumi Nishida, Yusuke Ueda, Atsushi Senda and Hyousuke Tsuboi, was led by Toyoji Wada and accompanied by three Sherpa under Sirdar Nga Dorje. The expedition approached the mountain from Tibet and established base camp at approximately 5,100 m (16,700 ft) on the South Kaqur Glacier on 8 September. The team set up two further camps at 6,100 m (20,000 ft) and 6,400 m (21,000 ft). On 24 September, the team started an attempt on the summit at 7:40 a m and all the members reached the summit after approximately four hours.ref name="Wada1"/>

In October 2024, American climbers Spencer Gray and Ryan Griffiths made the first ascent of the southwest arête of Kaqur Kangri from the Nepalese side with support from Matt Zia.

== See also ==
- List of mountains in China
- List of mountains in Nepal
- List of ultras of the Himalayas
- Changdi
