= Aijaz Siddiqi =

Aijaz (Urdu: اعجاز) Siddiqi (1911–1978) was an Urdu writer and poet. He was the son of the famous Urdu poet, Seemab Akbarabadi. He was born in Agra, Uttar Pradesh. After having founded Qasr-ul-Adab in 1923, Seemab Akbarabadi had in the year 1930 started publication of a literary journal in Urdu from Agra titled Shair; he was its first editor. A few years later i.e. in 1935, in order to concentrate on the other than more important activities of Qasr-ul- Adab, he had handed over the charge of this magazine to Aijaz Siddiqi who carrying forward the tradition of his father remained its editor till 1978 long after the publication of Shair was shifted from Agra to Mumbai in 1947 and Seemab Akbarabadi had in 1951 died in Karachi. Mahendra Nath, the Urdu short-story writer and younger brother of Krishan Chander had also joined him to compile and edit several special issues of Shair.

In his dress and appearance Aijaz resembled his father. Presently there exist two collections of his poems – 1) Khwaabon ke masiha and 2) Karb e khud kalaami, both published in 1966.
