= Zia Fatehabadi =

Indian Urdu poet and musical artist (1913–1986

- Born: Mehr Lal Soni; 9 February 1913; Kapurthala, Punjab, British India
- Died: 19 August 1986 (aged 73) Delhi, India
- Genres: Qat'aa, Rubai, Ghazal, Nazm, Geet and Sonnets
- Occupation: Reserve Bank of India (1936–1971)

Mehr Lal Soni (9 February 1913 – 19 August 1986), better known as Zia Fatehabadi, was an Indian Urdu ghazal and nazm writer. He was a disciple (shaagird) of Seemab Akbarabadi (1882–1951), who was a disciple of Nawab Mirza Khan Daagh Dehlvi (1831–1905). He used the takhallus (nom de plume) of Zia meaning "Light" on the suggestion of his teacher, Ghulaam Qadir Farkh Amritsari.

== Biography ==
Zia Fatehabadi was born on 9 February 1913 at Kapurthala, Punjab. He was the eldest son of Munshi Ram Soni (1884–1968), a Civil Engineer by profession, who belonged to the Soni Khatri family of Kapila Gotra that at some time during the reign of the Mughal Emperor Shahjahan, had migrated from Rajasthan to Punjab and settled at Fatehabad, Punjab near Tarn Taran

Zia Fatehabadi's father was an exponent of Indian Classical vocal and instrumental music, who often invited musicians and singers to his residence, was himself fond of singing and playing musical instruments, and a good player of chess. It was one such evening in Jaipur when the young school-going Zia Fatehabadi was not given by the invited singer a copy of Iqbal's ghazal that had been liked and wanted by him; this particular incident probably exasperated Zia's urge to write and made him a poet.

Even when Zia Fatehabadi was a college student his was a respected name in the Urdu world. After the publication of his first book,Tullu, which had received some disheartening criticism, he had thought of giving up writing but he was dissuaded from doing so by friends and elders. Zia Fatehabadi had started composing Urdu sh'ers and ghazals at an early age when he was still attending school in Jaipur.

His education began at Khalsa Middle School, Peshawar (1920 to 1922). However, he completed his schooling from Maharaja High School, Jaipur, Rajasthan (1923 to 1929), after which he obtained his B.A.(Hons) degree in Persian in 1933 and M.A. (English) degree in 1935 as a student of Forman Christian College, Lahore. He was consistently an above average student.

As the then editor of the Urdu section of the college house magazine The Folio, Zia Fatehabadi was instrumental in getting the first-ever Urdu short story "Sadhu" by Krishan Chander published in 1932. At that time, Krishan Chander was interested primarily in his English writings and edited the English section.

It is also in evidence that Zia Fatehabadi was infatuated with a Bengali girl named Meera, who was also studying in the same college at the time, and addressed almost all his love-poetry to her. Her name figures unreservedly in several of his writings. In an interview, he had once disclosed that she was that very Meera Sen who had actually inspired Meeraji to write superb poems and adopt her name as his takhallus. Zia Fatehabadi had met Meeraji for the first time when the latter accompanied by Upendranath Ashk, a friend of Zia Fatehabadi, visited the office of Moulana Salahudeen, Editor and proprietor of 'Adabi Duniya', Lahore, where Meeraji was employed at that time. Krishan Chander, Meeraji and Zia Fatehabadi were good friends.

It was during his college days that Zia Fatehabadi came into contact with Shabbir Hussain Josh Malihabadi and Samad Yar Khan Saghar Nizami. He developed a very close lifelong relationship with them, which both influenced as also helped shape his literary life.

In 1936, Zia Fatehabadi joined the Reserve Bank of India, from which he retired in 1971 as Deputy Chief Officer, a senior position in the bank. In 1942, he married Raj Kumari (1919–2003), daughter of Murli Ram Berera of Lahore. Before joining the Reserve Bank of India, while seeking suitable employment, Zia Fatehabadi was interviewed for an editor's post with All India Radio, which went to Majaz. However, Majaz and Zia Fatehabadi remained close friends.

== Literary career ==
Zia Fatehabadi began to write poetry in 1925 under the supervision of his mother, Shankari Devi, with the help of Maulvi Asghar Ali Haya Jaipuri, who used to teach him Urdu at home and who also imparted his own knowledge of Urdu poetry composition to him. By 1929, Zia Fatehabadi had become a familiar name in Urdu literary circles. In 1930, he became Seemab Akbarabadi's disciple and remained true to his ustad until his own death, working to spread Seemab's methods and instructions at all times. He never ever gave a moment's thought to his own name or fame and sought neither favours or honours nor public or state recognition. He categorically rejected such exercises. He believed that the real worth of a poet's creativity can, ultimately, be gauged impartially only by those who look deeper into his works, in their desire or eagerness to get to know the poet better.

In 1933, at the age of 20 and while still a college student, Zia Fatehabadi succeeded in having his very first collection of Urdu poems, Tullu (Dawn), published in Meerut by Saghar Nizami. He wrote from the heart and, efficaciously, dressed his feelings, emotions, thoughts and experiences with simple, delicate, sweet-sounding, lyrical, meaningful, easily understood words and phrases – the key features in his poetry. His inimitable style set him apart from his peers and gave him a distinct identity.

His writings were meant to touch one's heart and mind simultaneously and make one feel all that he himself had felt. He was totally at ease in the use of a variety of prose and poetical formats. However, he did not succumb to the practice of uninhibited expression of ideas in open forms, which had been adopted by some of his noted contemporaries, who had introduced symbolism in Urdu Poetry. In his article titled Zia Saheb, Gopichand Narang said that he (Zia) belonged to the Seemab Akbarabadi's circle of devoted writers; deep knowledge of the etiquette and effective use of language and expression, the immense richness of feelings and emotions meant to be conveyed, and the fine eloquence and methodology adorned his writings and he makes use of Hindi intonation in ghazal quite effectively and also quite meaningfully highlights the contemporary human pain and suffering; to appraise Zia Fatehabadi is to appraise the inherited tradition and refinement of our poetry. In his compositions, that demonstrate undefiled immaculate thought and brevity Zia Fatehabadi has revealed new and factual aspects of thought and insight.

جُدائی

جُدائی، آہ یہ اِک لفظ کِتنا یاس آگئیں ہے
تصوّر اِس کا امیدوں پہ پانی پھیر دیتا ہے
ہزاروں کوس اِس سے منزلِ آرام و تسکیں ہے
جو اِس سے ہو گیا واقف وہ پھر کب چین لیتا ہے
جُدائی باغ کی رنگینیوں کو چھین لیتی ہے
شراب و رقص سے محرُوم کر دیتی ہے انساں کو
جہاں آرائیوں، خود بینیوں کو چھین لیتی ہے
چُھپا دیتی ہے مایوسی کی تاریکی میں ارماں کو
یہ سب کچھ ہے، مگر مجبُور ہے میرا دلِ محزوں
محبّت پرورش پاتی رہی ہے اِس کے دامن میں
جمال دوست سے مہجور ہے میرا دل محزوں
وہ دشمن دوست تڑپایا تھا جس نے مجھ کو ساون میں
اُنہیں ہاتھوں میں دیدی ہے عنانِ آرزو میں نے
بھروسے پر خدا کے چھوڈ دی ہے جستجو میں نے

— Sonnet جدائی by Zia Fatehabadi taken from his book titled Noor e Mashriq 1937

While remaining true to the classical style, Zia Fatehabadi did not ignore changing trends, as is reflected in his rubaiaat, qat'aas, geets, ghazals, nazms and sonnets. These compositions evince his mastery of and command over the Urdu language. Zia Fatehabadi's contribution to Urdu language and literature spans over six decades and is voluminous.

Titled Noor-E-Mashriq, his first major collection was published in Delhi in 1937 from which the following couplet became widely known:

"Woh dekh mashriq se noor ubharaa liey huey jalwaa-e-haqiqat"
"Majaz ki tark kar ghulami ke tu to hey bandaa-e-haqiqat"

((Come hither and have a) look at the yonder light shining in the East emerging as the glowing Truth
(Now it is time that you too) cast aside your fetters temperamental for you are that very Truth.)

Though he did not identify himself with any particular group, trend or movement, Zia Fatehabadi apparently belonged, in equal measure, to all known groups and his noteworthy works reflect this. As an integral part of his literary activities, he would gladly attend poetic symposia and conferences, whenever invited to do so, and presided over many of these events. A selection of his presidential addresses titled Masanad e sadarat se was published in 1985.

He did not subscribe to the theory that poetry is spontaneous. He belongs to the school of thought which maintains that poetry is an amalgam of words and thoughts and that thoughts are seldom spontaneous.

Zia Fatehabadi's short-stories were prominently published by leading Urdu journals of his time; he was influenced by Premchand. His stories deal with the contemporary social issues in a simple straightforward manner. The characters of Zia Fatehabadi's stories are not new but give the impression that they have been known for a long time. He has dealt with the issues relating to Indian women in the manner that those characters are made to narrate their experiences at first-hand and the engrossed readers continue to read his stories without a break, which is the mark of a successful story-teller

Zia Fatehabadi died on 19 August 1986 after a prolonged and painful bout with illness. But then, he had once said:

" Kyaa gham agar qraar–o–sukun kii kamii rahii "
" Khush hoon ke kaamyaab merii zindagii rahii "

(I grieve not for the lack of unrest or for the lack of peace (in my life).
I am (gratefully) happy to have led (a contented and) a successful life.)

In a way, this one couplet (verse), taken from his book Gard-e-Raah (Urdu) published in 1963, succinctly sums up the personality and life of Zia Fatehabadi. He himself had led a life filled with hope and contentment, something he fervently wished others, too, would experience and enjoy. These sentiments won for him many admirers. Amongst those who appreciated as well as influenced his poetry were Firaq Gorakhpuri and Josh Malihabadi. Zia Fatehabadi was survived by his wife and six sons. His eldest son, Ravinder Kumar Soni and his youngest son, Sushil Soni, are English language poets, the former is also an Urdu language poet.

The following Qat'aa e taareekh composed by Sahir Hoshiarpuri in August 1986 to commemorate the demise of his old friend, Mehr Lal Soni Zia Fatehabadi, was published by Khushtar Girami in the October 1986 (Vol.50.No.10.) issue of the monthly "Biswin Sadi", New Delhi:

Jo kar sako na bayaan tum baasurat e alfaaz
Fasaanaa e gham e hasti baachasham e nam keh lo
Zubaan o fikr o takhyul jo saath de na saken
To "dil" ko saath mila kar "gham e Zia sah lo"

( If you are unable to find words to express your grief then do so by shedding tears.)
( If your speech, thoughts and intellect are unable to bear that grief then bear the loss of Zia with your saddened heart.)

== Works ==
Zia Fatehabadi embarked on his literary career with Tullu first published in 1933. In all, he produced nineteen works, consisting of eleven collections of poetry, one of short-stories, two of essays, one of presidential addresses, three collections of letters and one biography. Three of these books – Noor e Mashriq, Gard e Raah and Meri Tasveer – also contain Urdu sonnets that he had composed.

Much of his work, including Naats, scattered in various magazines and papers remains unpublished.

== Disciples ==
In his book, Zia Fatehabadi - Hayat Aur Karnaame (ISBN 9789351371076), Dr. Shabbir Iqbal has listed Shānti Saroop "Kaif", Abdul Khāliq "Khāliq" Bhatti, Tālib Hussain "Tāyaq" Hamdāni, Abdul Khaliq "Khaliq" Yeolavi, Rādhakrishan "Sehgal", Om Parkash "Bajāj", Jagdish Bhatnāgar "Hayāt", Satyapal "Jānbāz", "Shāhid" Sāgari, Abdul Rehman "Tābān" Ziai, Abdul Rashid "Arshi", Muhammad Musā "Nazar" Ziai Gonganavi, Abdul Sattār "Sahar" Chishti, "Rāhi" Gonganavi, Bhod Rāj "Shād" Kamālvi and Mohamad Saddiq "Sāhir" as the disciples of Zia Fatehabadi.

== Biographical assessment ==
- A comprehensive critical appraisal and interpretation of Zia's literary works was published in 1977 by the Urdu scholar, critic and author of Zikr-e-Ghalib, Malik Ram. Its title is Zia Fatehabadi Shakhs Aur Shair (Zia Fatehabadi: The Person and the Poet).
- An Urdu-language biography of Zia Fatehabadi, titled Budha Darakhat, meaning The Old Tree, written by Zarina Sani was published in 1979.
- In 1989, under the guidance of Adam Sheikh, Chairman of the Board of Studies in Urdu, and Farid Sheikh of Anjuman-e-Islamiyaa, Mumbai, Shabbir Iqbal of Dhulia, (Note: Shabbir Iqbal, son of Iftikhar Ahmed Fakhar (see Seemab Akbarabadi), was born on 31 May 1948 at Dhulia. He obtained his M.A.Degree from Pune University and thereafter joined National High School and Junior College, Dhulia, where he taught Urdu Literature.Beside his research work on Mehr Lal Soni Zia Fatehabadi he has also penned the Literary History of Khandesh which work titled " Muntashar Khake " was published by Nazma Publications, Dhulia, in the year 1984.He is a regular contributor to News Papers and periodicals, and also associated with many educational and social organisations.) Maharashtra, obtained his PhD degree from Bombay University with an Urdu-language dissertation entitled "Anjahaani Mehr Lal Soni Zia Fatehabadi – Hayaat Aur Kaarnaame" (The Late Mehr Lal Soni Zia Fatehabadi: Life and Works).
- Mohammad Ameenuddin Mohammad Idris of Nagpur University wrote a thesis in Urdu titled Zia Fatehabadi: Personality, Life and Works.

== Other interests ==
Zia Fatehabadi was not a professional poet. For over thirty-five years he worked at the Reserve Bank of India. He was a keen observer of economic trends, development and change. Zia Fatehabadi was very good at Mathematics and proficient in Persian, English and Sanskrit language and grammar. He was a keen student of Hindu astrology i.e. Jyotisa, and was deeply interested in the study of the Upanishads and the Rig Veda. He subscribed to the Advaita School promoted by Adi Sankara.

== Bibliography ==
List of books by Zia Fatehabadi:

Urdu Poetry:

- Tullu (Dawn) – published by Saghar Nizami, Adabi Markaz, Meerut in 1933. Foreword by Saghar Nizami.
- Noor-e-Mashriq (The Light of the East) – published by Jyoti Prasad Gupta, Jyoti Printing Works, Esplanade, Delhi in 1937. Introductions by Josh Malihabadi, Editor, Kaleem, Delhi, Hakim Azad Ansari (1871–1942) and Manzar Siddiqui, Editor, Kanwal, Agra.
- Zia Ke Sau Sher (A Hundred Verses of Zia) – published by Gajender Lal Soni, Mohan Building, near Lloyd's Bank, Delhi in 1938.
- Nai Subah (The New Morn) published by Adaaraa Seemab, Daryaganj, Delhi in 1952. Forewords by Munavvar Lakhnavi (1897–1970) and Prof. Mubashshir Ali Siddiqui M.A.(died 1987)
- Gard-e-Raah (The Road Dust)- published by Maktaba Shola aur Shabnam, Daryaganj, New Delhi in 1963. Foreword by Abr Ahasani Gunnauri (1898–1973) and Khushtar Girami (1902–1988)
- Husn-e-Ghazal (The beauty of Ghazal)- published by Miraj Mittal, Ambala in 1964.
- Dhoop Aur Chandni (The Sunlight and the Moonlight) – published by Radha Krishan Sehgal, Bazm-e-Seemab, J 5/21, Rajouri Garden, New Delhi in 1977.
- Rang-o-Noor (The Colour and the Light) – published by R.K.Sehgal, Bazm-e-Seemab, J 5/21, Rajouri Garden, New Delhi in 1981 (prize awarded by U.P.Urdu Academy).
- Soch ka Safar (The Journey of Thought) – published by R.K.Sehgal, Bazm-e-Seemab, J 5/21, Rajouri Garden, New Delhi in 1982.
- Naram garam hawain (The soft Warm Air) – published posthumously by R.K.Sehgal, Bazm-e-Seemab, J 5/21, Rajouri Garden, New Delhi in 1987 with the aid of Delhi Urdu Academy.
- Meri Tasveer (My Portrait)- published by GBD Books, I-2/16, Ansari Road, Daryaganj, New Delhi in 2011, ISBN 978-81-88951-88-8.
- The Qat'aat o Rubaiyat of Zia Fatehabadi (Quatrains of Zia Fatehabadi, original Urdu text and English Translation by Ravinder Kumar Soni And Sushil Soni) – published by Pigeon Books, an imprint of GBD Books, I-2/16, Ansari Road, Daryaganj, New Delhi in 2012 commemorating Zia Fatehabadi's Birth Centenary Year, ISBN 978-93-82025-05-4.
- Kuliyaat e Zia Fatehabadi Vol.1 (Urdu Poetry) published by Bazm e Seemab, Delhi, in 2017 as an E-book.

Urdu Prose:

- Zaaviyaha-e-nigaah (The viewpoint) – published by R.K.Sehgal, Bazm-e-Seemab, J 5/21, Rajouri Garden, New Delhi in 1983. Foreword by Jagdish Bhatnagar Hayat – (essays) (prize awarded by U.P.Urdu Academy).
- Suraj doob gayaa (The sun has Set)(short-stories) – published by R.K.Sehgal, Bazm-e-Seemab, J 5/21, Rajouri Garden, New Delhi in 1981. In the year 2017, a Hindi transliteration of these stories 'सूरज डूब गया’ (ISBN 81-88891-66-5) done by Saleha Siddiqui, literary critic and writer, was published by Darul Eshaat e Mustafai, Delhi – 110006.
- Masnad-e-sadaarat se (From the Podium)(presidential addresses) – published by R.K.Sehgal, Bazm-e-Seemab, J 5/21, Rajouri Garden, New Delhi in 1985.
- Seemab baanaam Zia (Seemab to Zia)(letters of Seemab to Zia) – published by R.K.Sehgal, Bazm-e-Seemab, J 5/21, Rajouri Garden, New Delhi in 1981.Foreword by Rashid Hasan Khan.
- Zikr-e-Seemab (About Seemab)(Biography of Seemab) – published by R.K.Sehgal, Bazm-e-Seemab, J 5/21, Rajouri Garden, New Delhi in 1984.
- Sher aur Shair (The Verse and the Poet)(essays) – published by R.K.Sehgal, Bazm-e-Seemab, J 5/21, Rajouri Garden, New Delhi in 1974.
- Muzaameen-e-Zia (The Essays of Zia)
- Zia Fatehabadi ke Khatoot (Letters of Zia Fatehabadi).

Select Reading:

List of books in Urdu on the life and works of Zia Fatehabadi:

- Budha Darakhat (The Old Tree) – Biography of Zia Fatehabadi written by Zarina Sani, Nagpur, foreword by Unwan Chishti, and published by R.K.Sehgal, Bazm-e-Seemab, J 5/21, Rajouri Garden, New Delhi in 1979.
- Zia Fatehabadi – Shakhs aur Shair (Zia Fatehabadi – The Person and the Poet) – Critical appraisal of Zia Fatehabadi's life and works conducted by Malik Ram and published by Ilmi Majlis, 1429, Chhata Nawab Sahib, Farashkhana, Delhi, in 1977.
- Editorial write up on Zia Fatehabadi's life and works in the Feb.1985 issue of Aaj Kal Vol.43 no.7 published by the Govt. of India, Publication Division Urdu, Patiala House, New Delhi.
- Zia Fatehabadi Number Oct.1986 issue of " Hamaari Zabaan " Vol.45 no.37 published by Anjuman-e-Taraqi Urdu Hind (Delhi), Rouse Avenue, New Delhi, it contains articles and views of noted Urdu writers on the life and works of Zia Fatehabadi.
- Zia-e-Urdu – Special issue of Nov.1985 by Saphia Siddiqui on behalf of Adara-e-Adab, London (U.K.) it contains articles and views of noted Urdu writers of U.K.
- Editorial write up in the Oct.1986. issue of the Monthly Biswin Sadi Vol.50 No.10, published by Biswin Sadi Publication (P) Ltd., Daryaganj, Delhi.
- Anjahaani Mehr Lal Soni Zia Fatehabadi – Hayaat aur Karnaame 1989 Doctoral Dissertation on the life and works of Zia Fatehabadi presented by Shabbir Iqbal of Bombay University.
- Zia Fatehabadi Number Special commemorative December 2015 issue of Urdu Monthly-The “Shair” Monthly, Mumbai, Vol.86 No.12, published by Maktaba Qasr-ul-adab, Girgaon, Mumbai-400004; it contains 17 articles as well as views and opinions of old and contemporary noted Urdu writers and poets on the life and works of Zia Fatehabadi.
- Zia e Urdu - Zia Fatehabadi (ISBN 81-88912-84-0) – Collection of twenty-three articles written by Prof. Ali Ahmed Fatami, formerly HOD Urdu Dept. St. John College, Agra, India; Dr. Shahida Dilawar Shah of Forman Christian College, Lahore; and other prominent Urdu academicians and litterateurs on the life and works of Zia Fatehabadi, edited by Saliha Siddiqui and published in 2016 by Book Corporation, Delhi-110006.
- Special Number Banaam Mehr Lal Soni Zia Fatehabadi October 2016 Special Issue of Monthly 'Asbaque', Pune (India), Vol. 35 No.10, commemorating the memory of Zia Fatehabadi – contains 33 articles by eminent authors and literary critics on the life and works of Zia Fatehabadi, edited by Nazeer Fatehpuri.

== See also ==
- List of Indian writers
- List of Indian poets
