= Unwan Chishti =

Indian poet, scholar and literary critic

- Born: Iftikhar ul Hasan; 5 February 1937; Manglaur, District Haridwar, Uttarakhand, India
- Died: 1 February 2004 (aged 66); Delhi, India
- Occupations: Teacher at Jamia Millia Islamia University, was Head of Urdu Department – Retired as Dean of Faculty of Humanities and Languages in 1997
- Known for: Nazms, Ghazals, Criticism, Historian of Literature

Unwan Chishti (5 February 1937 – 1 February 2004) was an Urdu poet who gained repute as a poet, as a scholar, as a teacher and as a literary critic. He was the disciple of Abr Ahasani Gunnauri.

== Life ==
Chishti was born Iftikharul Hasan in Manglaur, Haridwar district, Uttarakhand. He was the son of Pirzadah Shah Anwarul Hasan Anwar Manglauri. He completed his early education in Manglaur and Muzaffarnagar. After his graduation he got his M.A. (geography, 1961), M.A. (Urdu, 1963), M.Lit. (1968), and Ph.D. (1973) degrees. He worked as a lecturer in Shoaib Mohammadia College in Agra before joining Jamia Millia Islamia on 15 September 1964. He taught Urdu and rose to be the Head of Urdu Department, Jamia Millia Islamia University, Delhi; he retired in 1997 as Dean of the Faculty of Humanities and Languages.

== Literary career ==
Chishti was an Urdu poet, a critic and an historian of Urdu literature, and has many books to his credit. He was the disciple of Abr Ahasani Gunnauri. He has to his credit three published collections of poems – Zauq e Jamaal, Nim baz and Aks o shakhs.

His literary career started in 1950 with the composition of his first ghazal. His first nazm, Salaam ae musafir, was published in 1953 in the Urdu Monthly Shair. His first collection of poems titled Zauq e jamaal was published in 1966 followed by Nim baaz and Aks o shakhs in 1968. He learned the art of writing Urdu poems from his father and Nikahat Ali Adab Siddiqi.

A comprehensive appraisal on the works of Unwan Chishti conducted by Sughra Alam was published in 2003 titled – Unwan Chishti Muhaqqiq, Shair and Naqid. Earlier, Paimana e Sifat, dealing with his life and works, had been published in 1995.

== Bibliography ==
Books by Unwan Chishti:

1) Urdu poetry:

- Nim Baaz
- Zauq e Jamaal
- Aks o shakhs

2) Books (of research and criticism) by Unwan Chishti:

- Manaviyyat ki talaash
- Aruzi aur fanni masail
- Urdu shairi men haiat ke tajurbe
- Tanqidi pairae
- Tanqid se tahqiq tak
- Tanqid namah
- Makatib e Ahsan, ma’muqqaddamah va havashi
- Urdu shaeri mein jadeeddiyat ki rawayat
- Azadi ke bad Delhi mein urdu ghazal
- Chand chakor aur chandani
- Urdu mein classiki tanqid
- Islah nama
- Harf e barhana
- Manzoom tarjume ka amal
- Nazim e jadeed ki falsafiyana asas
- Minar e sadaa
- Urdu mein classiki tanqid
- Krishan Chander: Hayat o Khidmat
