= Chandipur =

Chandipur may refer to:

== Bangladesh ==
- Chandipur, Bangladesh, a village in Barisal Division, Bangladesh

== India ==
- Chandipur (community development block), an administrative division in West Bengal
- Chandipur (Vidhan Sabha constituency), an assembly constituency in West Bengal
- Chandipur, Odisha, a resort town in Baleswar District, Odisha, India
- Chandipur, Purba Medinipur, a village, with a police station, in Purba Medinipur district, West Bengal, India

== See also ==
- Chandi (disambiguation)
- Chandpur (disambiguation)
