= Arsh Malsiani =

Indian Urdu poet (1908–1979)

Bal Labhu Ram Mukand (1908–1979), better known by his penname Arsh Malsiani, was an Indian Urdu poet and writer. He was the son of Josh Malsiyani, an Urdu and Persian scholar and poet. From 1948 until his retirement in 1968, Malsiani worked in the Publications Division of the Government of India, firstly as an assistant editor of the Urdu monthly journal Aaj Kal under editor Josh Malihabadi, then from 1954 as editor.

Four collections of his poetry were published: Haft Rang, Chang-o-Āhang, Sharar-e Sang, and Āhang-e Hijaz. His biographical sketch of Maulana Azad was published in 1976.

A critical appraisal of Malsiani's life and literary works was written by Jagan Nath Azad and published as Ānkhen Tarastain Hai, by Mehr Lal Soni Zia Fatehabadi and included as a separate chapter in his book Zaviyaha-e nigaah and by Birendar Parsad Saxena as Arsh Malsiani.
