= Biswin Sadi =

Indian literary magazine

- Editor: Shama Afroz Zaidi
- Former editors: Z Rahman Nayyar
- Founder: Khushtar Girami
- Founded: 1937
- Language: Urdu

Biswin Sadi is an Urdu language literary magazine in India. Founded in 1937, Biswin Sadi is one of the oldest Urdu magazines in India. Many of the top Urdu writers like Amrita Pritam, Kashmiri Lal Zakir, Khushwant Singh, Krishan Chander and Sahir Ludhianwi published in it. The magazine was one of the most widely read Urdu magazines, selling around 40,000 copies per issue at one point. It features content ranging from political satire, cartoons, health news to short stories.

== Overview ==
Biswin Sadi was founded by Khushtar Girami in 1937 as a monthly magazine. Z Rahman Nayyar bought the magazine in 1977. The magazine was doing well even though other popular magazines like Shama and Ruby ceased publication long ago. After Rahman's demise, Biswin Sadi ceased publication for two years. It was revived by Rahman's wife Shama Afroz Zaidi as a biannual publication.
