= Subhash C. Kashyap =

Indian political scientist (1929–2026)

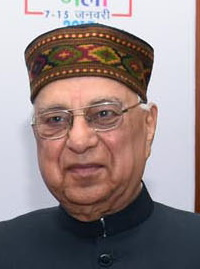
- Born: 10 May 1929; Chandpur, Bijnor, United Provinces of Agra and Oudh, British India
- Died: 4 June 2026 (aged 97)
- Education: Allahabad University
- Scientific career
- Fields: Political Science
- Workplaces: Parliament of India and Centre for Policy Research

Subhash C. Kashyap (10 May 1929 – 4 June 2026) was an Indian political scientist who was secretary-general of 7th Lok Sabha, 8th Lok Sabha and 9th Lok Sabha and Lok Sabha Secretariat (Lower House of Parliament of India) from 1984 to 1990. He was also an expert in the Indian constitution, constitutional law, parliamentary experts and a distinguished scholar, and was associated with the parliament of India from 1953. Kashyap also headed an International Centre for Parliamentary Documentation, IPU at Geneva till 1983. He was the first Indian to head an International Organisation. Kashyap was honorary constitutional advisor to the Government of India on Panchayati Raj Laws and Institutions. He was also recipient of several prestigious awards for the Best Books in Constitution, Law and Political Science. Kashyap was an honorary research professor at the Centre for Policy Research (CPR), New Delhi.

== Career ==
Kashyap began career at Allahabad as journalist, advocate and university teacher. He joined the Parliament Secretariat in 1953 and was associated with Parliament of India for over 37 yrs. He became Secretary-General of Lok Sabha on 31 December 1983. He took voluntary retirement in 1990 from the post of secretary-general, Lok Sabha and Lok Sabha Secretariat, Parliament of India. Kashyap had an outstanding academic career with higher education and professional training in India, US, UK, and Switzerland.

He was also a member of the National Commission to Review the Working of Constitution and chairman of its drafting and editorial committee. He was also one of the key members of the high level committee in the making of One Nation, One Election. Kashyap also served as the president of Indian National Bar Association.

== Death ==
Kashyap died on 4 June 2026, at the age of 97.

== Positions held ==
- Patron, Integrated Talent Development Mission (ITDM)
- Honorary Research Professor, Centre for Policy Research (CPR)
- President, Rashtriya Jagriti Sansthan
- President Citizenship Development Society
- Member, governing body Auroville Foundation
- Advocate and consultant, Supreme Court of India
- Member of the India International Centre's Committee of Experts on the Constitution
- Honorary director of the Project on Constitutional Reforms
- Chairman of the Conferences of Secretaries (1987, 1989)
- Former director of the institute of Constitutional and Parliamentary Studies on Panchayati Raj laws and institutions.
- Chairman, governing body, Deshbandhu College (University Of Delhi).
- Founder Chairman, Academy of Grassroots Studies and Research of India (AGRASRI)

== Awards ==
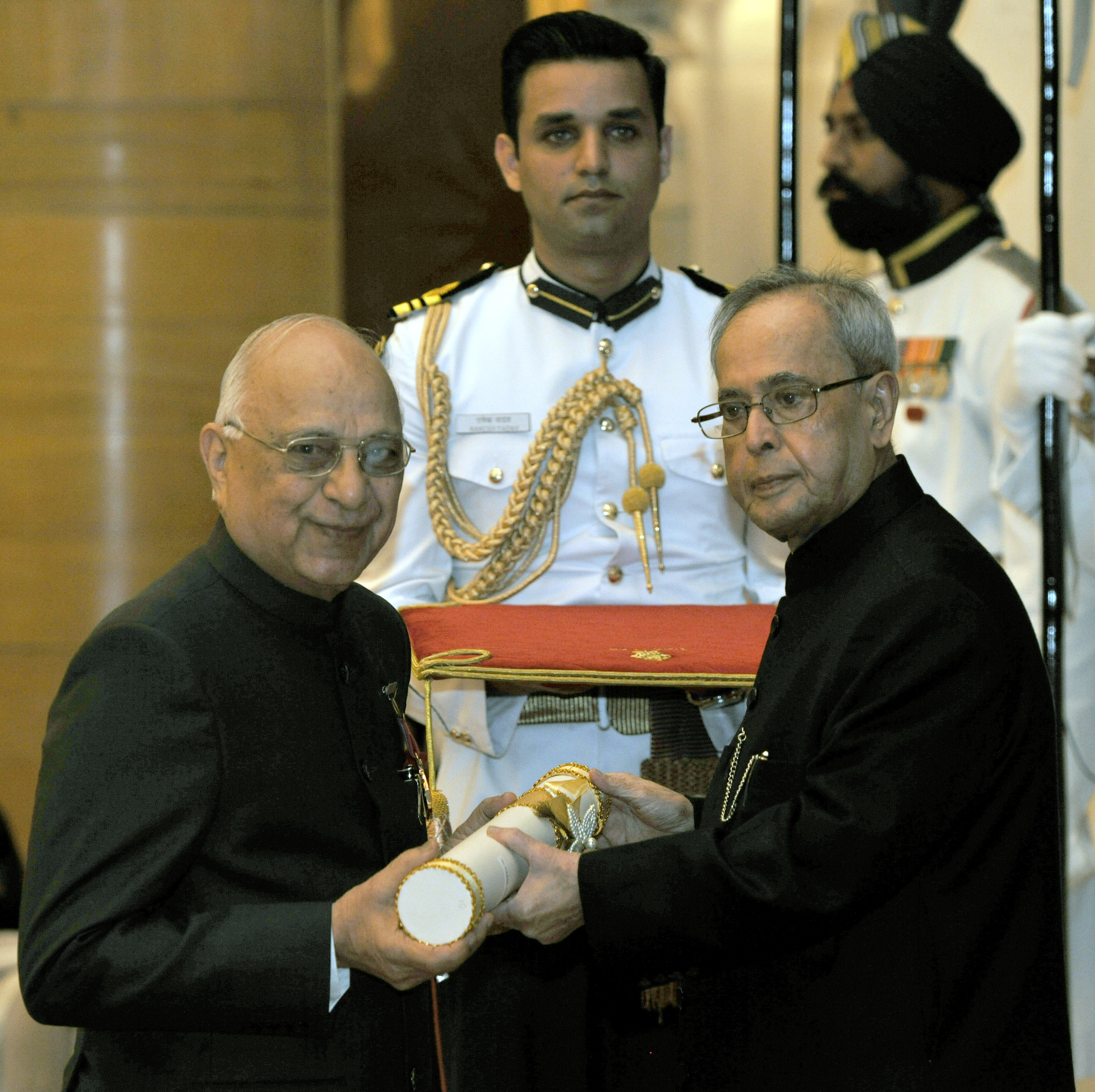
The president Pranab Mukherjee presenting the Padma Bhushan Award to Dr. Subhash C. Kashyap on April 08, 2015

Kashyap was awarded the Honorary title of Commander and degree of H.O.A.S.F. (Honorary Order of the Academy of San Francisco) for services in the field of Constitutional Law. He received Motilal Nehru award two times, and the Coveted Jawaharlal Nehru Fellowship of 1996–98; also received 'Vidur Samman', 'Rajiv Smriti Samman', 'Vidhi Seva Samman' and 'Great Son of the Soil A Award' and many more awards.

- Padma Bhushan award in the field of Public Affairs (2015)

== Published works ==
Kashyap published more than 500 research articles and papers, and over 100 books. Some of his books are listed here:

1. Framing of India's Constitution -A Study
2. Constitution Making Since 1950 -An Overview (1950–2004)
3. Blueprint of Political Reforms, CPR, Shipra, New Delhi, 2003.
4. The Speaker's Office, Shipra, Delhi, 2001.
5. History of the Parliament of India -6 Volumes, (1994–2000)
6. Parliamentary Procedure, Law, Privileges, Practice and Precedents -2 volumes
7. Institutions of Governance in South Asia, Konark, Delhi, 2000.
8. Understanding the Constitution of India, NCERT, New Delhi, 2000
9. Citizens and the Constitution (Citizenship values under the Constitution), Publications Division, Ministry of I. & B., Govt. of India, 1997
10. Anti-defection Law and Parliamentary Privileges
11. Legislative Management Studies, National, Delhi, 1995.
12. Our Constitution -Introduction to India's Constitution and Constitutional Law, NBT, New Delhi, 1994
13. History of the Freedom Movement
14. Delinking Religion and Politics
15. Parliamentary Wit and Humour, Shipra, Delhi, 1992.
16. The Ten Lok Sabhas, Shipra, Delhi, 1992.
17. History of Parliamentary Democracy, Shipra, Delhi, 1991.
18. Office of the Speaker and Speakers of Lok Sabha, Shipra, Delhi, 1991.
19. The Political System and Institution Building Under Jawaharlal Nehru, National, Delhi, 1990.
20. Jawaharlal Nehru, the Constitution and the Parliament
21. Our Parliament -An introduction to the Parliament of India, NBT, New Delhi, 1989 (2000 edition). The book is also available in many other Indian languages.
22. Parliament of India -Myths and Realities, National, Delhi, 1988.
23. Govind Ballath Pant -Parliamentarian, Statesman and Administrator, National, New Delhi, 1988.
24. The Ministers and the Legislators, Metropolitan, New Delhi, 1982.
25. Jawaharlal Nehru and the Constitution, Metropolitan, 1982.
26. Human Rights and Parliament, Metropolitan, New Delhi, 1978.
27. Politics of Power, National, Delhi, 1974.
28. Tryst with Freedom, National, 1973.
29. The Unknown Nietzsche -His socio-political thought and legacy, National, Delhi, 1970.
30. Politics of Defection -A Study of State Politics in India, National, Delhi, 1969.
31. Our Political System, National Book Trust, 2008.
