= Chandrapur Assembly Constituency =

Chandrapur Assembly Constituency may refer to these electoral constituencies in India:

- Chandrapur, Chhattisgarh Assembly constituency
- Chandrapur, Maharashtra Assembly constituency

== See also ==
- Chandrapur (disambiguation)
