= Saghar Nizami =

Indian Urdu poet and writer (1905–1983)

- Born: Samad Yar Khan; 21 December 1905; Aligarh, United Provinces of Agra and Oudh, British India
- Died: 1983 (aged 77–78); Delhi, India
- Other name: Samad Yar Khan
- Occupations: Journalist, poet
- Known for: Nazms and ghazals

Saghar Nizami (1905–1983), also known as Samad Yar Khan, was an Indian poet, including writer of ghazals and nazms in Urdu.

He was one of the earliest disciples of Seemab Akbarabadi (1882–1951), and was a recipient of the third-highest Indian honour of the Padma Bhushan, in 1969, for his contributions to literature.

== Early life ==
Saghar Nizami was born in Aligarh on 21 December 1905. His father, Sardar Ahmed Yar Khan, was a medical doctor in the service of the British government of India.

== Literary career ==
From 1923 to 1932, he edited Paimana, a monthly magazine published by his teacher in Agra.

In 1933, Nizami shifted to Meerut and founded Adabi Markaz, a publishing house which, in its very first year of operation, introduced Mehr Lal Soni Zia Fatehabadi to the Urdu literary world by publishing Tullu (Dawn), the latter's first collection of poems. Years later, Yusuf Hussain, editor of Nairang e Khayal was to class Nizami, Ahsan Danish, and Mehr Lal Soni Zia Fatehabadi as the three bright stars (of Urdu poetry) of the modern era.

During his lifetime, he published six collections of ghazals and nazms: Subuhi (1934), Badah e mashriq (1934), Kahkashaan (1934), Rangmahal (1943), Mauj e saahil (1949) and Nehrunama (1967). His collected works, Kuliat e Saghar Nizami, were published in three volumes by Modern Publishing House, Delhi, between 1999 and 2001.

An appraisal of Nizami's works, life and personality, titled Saghar Nizami — Fan aur shakhsiyat ma'a kalam and written by Zamir Ali Khan, was published in 1985; this book also contains his selected ghazals and nazms. In his article titled Two Anarkalis: Saghar Nizami's Dream Drama and the Deconstruction of the Parsi Theatre, Afroz Taj compares Nizami's play Anarkali to the earlier play of the same name by Imtiyaz Ali Taj.

Just as Kundan Lal Saigal had done for Seemab Akbarabadi so did Master Madan (1923–1942) by singing Yoon na reh reh kar hamen tersaaiye and Hairat se tak raha hai jahan e wafa mujhe, the two ghazals written by Saghar Nizami, made Saghar Nizami well known; the music for these ghazals was composed by Pandit Amarnath.

=== Bibliography ===
- Subuhi (1934)
- Badah e Mashriq (1934)
- Kahkashaan (1934)
- Rangmahal (1943)
- Mauj e saahil (1949)
- Nehrunama (1967)

=== Honors ===
Nizami was a recipient of the Padma Bhushan Award (1969) and the Ghalib Award (1982).
