= Chanthaburi (disambiguation) =

Chanthaburi is a town in eastern Thailand.

Chanthaburi may also refer to:

- Chanthaburi Province, the province based at the town
- Mueang Chanthaburi District, the district around the town
- Chanthaburi Mountains, a mountain range in eastern Thailand
- Chanthaburi River, a river in eastern Thailand
- Roman Catholic Diocese of Chanthaburi, the diocese covering eastern Thailand
- Monthon Chanthaburi, a former administrative subdivision of Thailand under the monthon system

== See also ==
- Chandpur (disambiguation)
