= Chandika =

Chandika may refer to:

- Chandi, the supreme Goddess of Devi Mahatmya
- Chandika, Nepal, a village in western Nepal
- Chandika (film), a 1940 Indian Telugu-language film
- Chandika (comics), a fictional character appearing in Indian comic books published by Raj Comics

== See also ==
- Chandi (disambiguation)
