= Gunnaur =

- Town
- Location in Uttar Pradesh, India Gunnaur (India)
- Coordinates: 28.25°N 78.43°E
- Country: India
- State: Uttar Pradesh
- District: Sambhal

Government
  - Body: town area
  - MLA: Ajit Kumar Urf Raju Yadav
- Elevation: 11,888 m (39,003 ft)

Population
  - Total: 23,665

Languages
  - Official: Hindi
- Time zone: UTC+5:30 (IST)
- PIN: 243722
- Telephone code: 05836
- Vehicle registration: UP 38
- Website: up.gov.in

Gunnaur is a town and a nagar panchayat in Sambhal district in the Indian state of Uttar Pradesh. Gunnaur is located at 28.25°N 78.43°E. It has an average elevation of 170 metres (557 feet). Dr. Harish Yadav, a writer, poet and bureaucrat hails from Gunnur.

== Demographics ==
As of the 2001 Census of India, Gunnaur is basically a village constituency of 4.38 lakh people. Males constitute 52% of the population and females 48%. Gunnaur has an average literacy rate of 31%, lower than the national average of 59.5%: male literacy is 38%, and female literacy is 24%. In Gunnaur, 19% of the population is under 6 years of age.

Religions in Gunnaur
Religion	Percent
Muslims	62.42%
Hindus	37.08%
Christian	0.35%
Sikh	0.09%
Others	0.05%

Religions in Gunnaur Tehsil
Religion	Percent
Hindus	88.22%
Muslims	11.39%
Others	0.40%

== See also ==
- Abr Ahasani Gunnauri
