= Malik Ram =

Indian scholar of Urdu, Persian, and Arabic (1906–1993)

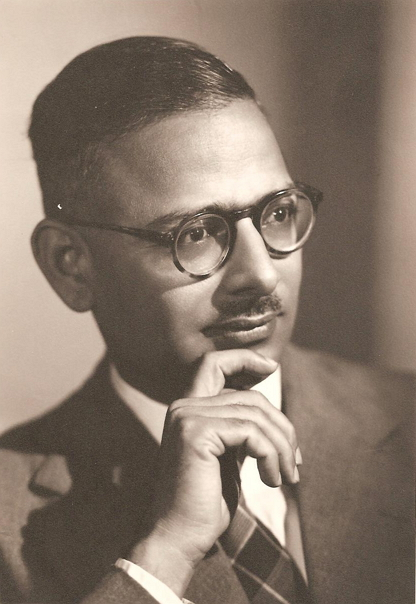
- Malik Ram
- Born: Malik Ram Baveja; 22 December 1906; Phalia, Mandi Bahauddin
- Died: 16 April 1993 (aged 86); New Delhi
- Occupation: Government of india service (1939–1965)
- Awards: Sahitya Akademi

Malik Ram Baveja (1906–1993) was a renowned Urdu, Persian and Arabic scholar from India. He received the Sahitya Akademi Award in 1983 for his monumental work Tazkirah-e-Muasireen.

An internationally acclaimed authority on Mirza Ghalib, the Urdu and Persian poet, Malik Ram was also one of the leading Urdu writers and critics of his time. He published about eighty works in his lifetime, including those he had edited. His works are in Urdu, Persian, Arabic and English, but predominantly in Urdu, and cover literary, religious and historical subjects. In addition, he wrote well over 200 erudite articles and essays in Urdu for literary journals in India and Pakistan.

== Biography ==
Malik Ram was born on 22 December 1906 in Phalia. After his schooling in Wazirabad, he was educated at Government College, Lahore. Between 1931 and 1937 he worked as a journalist. At first he was the joint-editor of the Lahore monthly literary journal Nairang-i-Khayal. and subsequently its editor. He was concurrently the de facto editor of the Lahore weekly Arya Gazette. Later, from January 1936 until June 1936, he was an assistant editor of the Lahore daily newspaper Bharat Mata. From 1939 to 1965, he was in the Indian Foreign Service. He took advantage of his foreign postings and assignments to travel to many countries in Asia, the Middle East and Europe, whenever time permitted, to view or study oriental texts and manuscripts lodged in their archives, libraries and museums.

In 1965, after retiring from Government service, he joined India's National Academy of Letters, the Sahitya Akademi in New Delhi, where he was in charge of its Urdu section and also edited the complete works of Maulana Abul Kalam Azad. In January 1967, he launched his own quarterly literary review Tahreer and as its editor he was actively associated with Ilmi Majlis in Delhi, a body of young Urdu research scholars and writers. He himself remained a prolific writer until he died.

Shortly before he died, he donated his entire library of books and manuscripts to the Jamia Hamdard University Library in Delhi, where they are housed as the Malik Ram Collection. He died, aged 86, on 16 April 1993 in New Delhi.

== Literary life and works ==
=== Mirza Ghalib ===
Malik Ram devoted much of his life to the study of Mirza Asadullah Khan Ghalib, the Urdu poet, known universally as Ghalib. He was fascinated by Urdu literature in general and Mirza Ghalib in particular. He edited and annotated Ghalib's major works in Urdu and Persian: “Sabd-e-Chin”, “Diwan-e-Ghalib”, “Gul-e-Raana” and “Khutoot-e-Ghalib”.

At the age of 31, he had already presented his own research on Ghalib’s life and works in “Zikr-e-Ghalib” first published in 1938. This book prompted Kausar Chandpuri (1904–1990), the Urdu novelist, short-story writer and critic, to write "Jahan-e-Ghalib" presenting the dark side of Ghalib. "Zikr-e-Ghalib", the book with which Malik Ram established his reputation and fame as an authority on Ghalib, long before the poet became a household name, ran into five editions in his lifetime. The comprehensively revised fifth edition was published in 1976 and it remains an authoritative work of reference on Ghalib cited in scholarly works on the poet. The consensus in the academic world is that Malik Ram would have left his mark on Urdu literature with just this one work. He was working on a sixth edition when he died.

Malik Ram's "Mirza Ghalib" in English was first published in 1968 by the National Book Trust, India and has been re-issued regularly. It has also been translated into many languages. It was even translated into Urdu in Pakistan by Mohammed Ismail Panipati.

“Talamiza-e-Ghalib" was first published in 1958 and records the biographical details of 146 disciples of Ghalib with samples of their compositions. In his article Tazkirahs, Malik Ram and his passion for Ghalib published in Pakistan's leading English-language daily newspaper Dawn on 3 May 2010, Rauf Parekh, the writer and critic, says it was the first time in the history of Urdu literature that a writer had undertaken this kind of research and that this book saw Malik Ram ride on the waves of fame thus cementing his reputation as "Ghalib Shanas" (Ghalib expert and scholar ). Parekh wrote:

Recording the lives of those known as 'talamiza' (disciples or students) of a great poet was not something new to Urdu, but the meticulous and painstaking research that Malik Ram had carried out for writing the lives of Ghalib's students was remarkable and was, till then, unheard of in Urdu and made him instantaneously recognised as an expert on Ghalib.

The second edition of "Talamiza-e-Ghalib", with twice as many pages as the first, was published in 1984, taking the total number of Ghalib's pupils to 181 and also provides details of another 40 part-time pupils. Malik Ram was awarded the 1984 Urdu prize for this work by the Urdu Academy in Delhi.

Among his other major works on Ghalib, in which he either presented his own interpretation of the poet's mystical or disputed compositions, or analysed his enduring contribution to Urdu and Persian poetry and literature, the best known are: "Fasanah-yi Ghalib" (1977) and "Guftar-i Ghalib" (1985).

He was instrumental in organising the Ghalib centenary celebrations in 1969. He wrote two special articles in English ( Ghalib: Man and Poet and The Works of Ghalib ) on this occasion which were published by the Press Information Bureau of the Government of India and released to the international press. His book "Ayar-i Ghalib", a collection of thirteen erudite articles on the poet, of which two were written by him, appeared in the same year and he also published a new edition of "Diwan-i-Ghalib" to coincide with the poet's centenary.

=== Maulana Azad ===
In 1965, having retired from government service, Malik Ram took up permanent residence in New Delhi and joined the Sahitya Akademi where, in three years, he edited the collected works of Maulana Abul Kalam Azad comprising his letters, speeches and literary works as well as his translation of the Quran into Urdu in four volumes. These were published by the Sahitya Akademi and have been reprinted several times since Malik Ram died.

Malik Ram had started his own literary career studying Mirza Ghalib in depth. He accorded the same attention in his twilight years to Maulana Azad's works in Urdu and Arabic. He is now regarded as an authority on the Maulana as well and his book "Kuch Maulana Azad ke bare mein" (Reflections on Maulana Azad) on the life and works of Maulana Azad, first published in 1989, is required reading for research students in this field.

=== Tahreer ===
In January 1967, Malik Ram founded the quarterly Urdu literary review "Tahreer" of which he was the editor until it ceased publication in 1978. This research journal presented scholarly articles on literary issues and personalities, contributed by specialists in their respective field of research. Special issues were dedicated to literary figures on whom Malik Ram and his research associates had conducted due diligence research. Many of those issues were also published as books.

He actively supported and guided a body of young Urdu scholars and writers (Ilmi Majlis) and encouraged them to produce original research material, and all "Tahreer" publications carried the "Ilmi Majlis" imprint. In a profile of Malik Ram on 17 April 1972 "The Statesman", a leading English-language daily newspaper published in New Delhi, commented:

Malik Ram's contribution to the development of Urdu research is considerable. He ranks first among the critics and one of his achievements will always be the interest he created in a body of young scholars in research in Urdu. His quarterly "Tahreer" is must reading wherever Urdu is studied.

Following in the footsteps of Syed Sulaiman Nadvi, who, in his time, had regularly published obituaries (tazkirahs) in the journal "Maarif", Malik Ram popularised obituary-writing and became an obituarist of renown through the obituaries he published in "Tahreer" under the heading Wafiyat.

These obituaries were eventually expanded and included in his monumental four-volume "Tazkirah-e-Muasireen" covering the lives of 219 Urdu poets and writers who died between 1967 and 1976. This highly acclaimed work received the 1983 Sahitya Akademi Urdu Award. In 2010, all four parts of "Tazkirah-e-Muasireen were published in an omnibus volume of 1060 pages in Rawalpindi.

The last issue of "Tahreer" was published in December 1978. After twelve years in which 46 issues were published, Malik Ram decided to fold the journal for health reasons. He had funded the publication of the journal himself and there was no one around who was prepared to take his 'hobby' further.

== Works on contemporaries ==
Malik Ram did not overlook the then living Urdu writers. He produced six analytical biographical works on prominent contemporary poets and writers. These were published in his "Tahreer" series of comprehensive critical literary appraisals and, for the first time, incorporated the original research material on the subjects gathered by his "Ilmi Majlis" associates viz.

1970: Jigar Barelvi – Shakhsiyat aur Fann (1890–1976) *co-editor: Saifi Premi

1973: Josh Malsiyani – Shakhsiyyat aur Fann (1884–1976)

1974: Syed Masud Hasan Rizvi 'Adib' – Zat o Sifat (1893–1975)

1974: Rasheed Ahmad Siddiqi – Kardar, Afkar, Guftar (1894–1977 )

1974: L. Ahmad Akbarabadi ( 1885–1980)

1977: Zia Fatehabadi – Shakhs aur Shair (1913–1986)

In his award-winning memoir Woh Surten Ilahi (Images of Legends), published in 1974, Malik Ram salutes some of the 'legends' he had associated with on his literary journey viz. Saail Dehlvi (1864-1945); Nawab Sadar Yar Jung Habibur Rahman Khan Sherwani (1867-1950) of Bhikampur and Datawali (Aligarh) State; Sulaiman Nadvi; Brij Mohan Dattatreya Kaifi; Yagana Changezi; Jigar Moradabadi; Niaz Fatehpuri; and Maulana Ghulam Rasool Mehr. The memoir opens with an account of his fictional meeting with Mirza Ghalib, the only piece of fiction Malik Ram ever published, based on his lifelong 'association' with the poet, as he says in the preface.

He also compiled and published six felicitation volumes (festschriften) dedicated to distinguished contemporary literary figures and educationalists. Each volume also includes his own detailed research article on the recipient of the festschrift viz.

Nazr-e Zakir : Zakir Husain, 1897–1969, Scholar and the third President of India from 13 May 1967 until his death on 3 May 1969.

Nazr-e Abid : Syed Abid Husain, 1896–1978, Educationalist, playwright, Translator. Recipient of the Sahitya Akademi Award for Urdu in 1956.

Nazr-e Arshi : Imtiyaz Ali Khan 'Arshi', 1904–1981, One of the leading Urdu research scholars of the 20th century. Recipient of the Sahitya Akademi Award for Urdu in 1961. *co-editor: Mukhtaruddin Ahmad

Nazr-e Zaidi : Bashir Hussain Zaidi, 1898–1992, Vice-Chancellor of Aligarh Muslim University (1956-1962) and an Urdu scholar.

Nazr-e Hameed : Hakim Abdul Hameed, 1908–1999, Philanthropist, Educationalist, Physician, writer, Founder of Jamia Hamdard and Hamdard (Wakf) Laboratories in India.

Nazr-e Mukhtar : Mukhtaruddin Ahmad 'Arzoo', 1924–2010, Professor of Arabic at Aligarh Muslim University and an Urdu and Arabic scholar.

Details of these felicitation volumes and Malik Ram's other works, including his "Tahreer" and "Ilmi Majlis" biographical editions, with dates of publication, are listed on the Open Library website.

== Hammurabi ==
In 1950/51 Malik Ram was posted in Iraq. His stay there aroused his interest in Babylonian civilisation and culture, in particular the laws of Hammurabi, the sixth Babylonian king. He was fascinated by the Code of Hammurabi and pursued the subject avidly, even after leaving Iraq.

Between 1952 and 1955, he wrote a series of six detailed articles in Urdu on Hammurabi, his laws, Babylonian civilisation, traditions, customs and language. Five of these appeared in Tarikh o Siasiyat the Karachi history journal. The sixth was published in Urdu another Karachi journal. It was the first time in Urdu literature that anything in detail had been published on this subject.

The six articles were subsequently revised, expanded and published as a book and in 2000, a new edition was published in Lahore entitled "Hammurabi aur Babli Tahzib va Tamaddum".

Malik Ram maintained that Hammurabi is one of the all-time great figures in world history, who should be given more attention, time and space in the modern world, in educational institutions and by the media.

== Islamic studies ==
Malik Ram was also a noted scholar of Islamic culture and literature. He spent almost two decades in the Middle East, where he travelled extensively and mastered Arabic. He wrote numerous articles on Islamic literature, mores and traditions. His two books on Islamic issues were acclaimed by specialists as well as laymen.

."Aurat aur Islami Taleem", an in-depth study of the status and rights of a woman in Islam – as daughter, wife, mother, divorcée, widow and heir – was first published as a book in Urdu in 1951 in Lucknow. The revised second edition was published in 1977 in Delhi and later in Lahore. It was also translated into English as "Woman in Islam" and published in Hyderabad, Delhi and New York. An Arabic translation of the first edition with the title "Al Mara'tu fil Islam" was published in Cairo in 1958 and of the second edition in New Delhi in 1990. Islamic organisations recommend the work as an authoritative treatise on the subject, which is easy to understand.

In 1984, he made his second major contribution to Islamic studies with the publication of "Islamiyat", pertaining to different aspects of Islam and Islamic traditions.

== Affiliations ==
In Alexandria, Egypt, where he spent fifteen years between 1939 and 1955, he was an active member of the Managing Committee of the YMCA which, under John P. Kirmiz, its director, played a prominent role in the literary life of the city, particularly during the Second World War. Malik Ram delivered a series of lectures on 'A woman's place in Islam' at 'Religious Affairs' seminars organised by the Alexandria YMCA. These were later expanded and published as his book Aurat aur Islami Taleem (Woman in Islam).

He was a regular participant in the activities of the Indian chapter of the International PEN founded in Bombay by Sophia Wadia, who had earlier been a founder member of the International PEN, the literary organisation for poets, playwrights, editors, essayists and novelists. For many years, he was the Urdu spokesman for the Indian PEN. In 1972, its journal reported:

Malik Ram, a well-known Urdu litterateur, spoke to the PEN Delhi Group on his life-long association with Urdu literature and his excursions into the wide field of Arabic and Persian learning. He was only twelve years old when he attracted the notice of one of his teachers who put him in charge of the school library. It had a collection of three to four hundred books, mostly legends and fables, which Malik Ram lapped up in a few months' time. The love of reading which he developed at an early age led him to classical literature.

He was also a Fellow of the Royal Asiatic Society of Great Britain and Ireland.

From 1973 to 1982, he was a member of the Sahitya Akademi General Council and Executive Committee. In 1977, he was elected Pro-Chancellor of Jamia Urdu, Aligarh, having been a member of its General Council earlier. In 1986, he served as a member of the Court of Aligarh Muslim University.

He was always deeply involved in the activities of the two leading Ghalib institutions in New Delhi: the Ghalib Institute and the Ghalib Academy. The Academy was founded in 1969 by Hakim Abdul Hameed, the founder of Jamia Hamdard, and Malik Ram played a significant role in its affairs, formally or behind the scenes, from its inauguration until he died. The Academy published a book about him entitled "Ghalib Shanas Malik Ram" a few years after his death.

From 1983 to 1987, he was the President of the long-established and influential 'Anjuman Taraqqi Urdu (Hind)' – the autonomous body concerned with all matters relating to the promotion of Urdu, which has over 600 branches in India.

== Analysis ==
Mukhtaruddin Ahmad 'Arzoo' (1924–2010) wrote a detailed article on Malik Ram in the 1955 "Shakhsiyat Number" of "Nuqoosh", Lahore. For many people, this was their introduction to Malik Ram. Since then, several major works have been published on him and his literary career.

“Malik Ram – Ek Mutaalah" (Malik Ram – A Study) was published in 1986. Edited by the prolific Urdu writer and poet Ali Jawad Zaidi, who has also written the foreword, this volume consists of contributions from prominent Urdu scholars, conversant with different aspects of Malik Ram's writings, who have attempted to evaluate his work in some detail.

Earlier, in 1972, to mark his 65th birth anniversary, the Malik Ram Felicitation Committee was formed, which comprised 79 academicians and orientalists from around the world who presented him with a festschrift – the Malik Ram Felicitation Volume. Ali Jawad Zaidi, who edited the festschrift, calls him one of the four pillars of Urdu research. In his contribution on Malik Ram and his works, entitled A Seeker of Knowledge, G.D. Chandan from the Press Information Bureau of the Government of India, and a well-known Urdu story writer himself, wrote:

Few Urdu scholars have produced, single-handed, such a variety and volume as Malik Ram. With a quest imbued with passion, scholarship marked by clarity and research covering biographical, historical and literary subjects, he has unearthed many a hidden gem of Urdu language and literature. His wide and varied range manifests a mind which revels in search, constantly seeking knowledge...Someone described criticism as an adventure of a soul among the masterpieces. Malik Ram's work shows that research is an adventure of the same soul among the lost or undisclosed aspects of both the masters and masterpieces.

The two companion felicitation volumes in Urdu titled "Armaghan-i Malik" were compiled and edited by Gopi Chand Narang. The three books were published to commemorate Malik Ram's 65th birthday, in appreciation of his erudition, scholastic versatility and manifold contributions to Urdu, Islamic and Oriental literature, and were presented to him by V.V. Giri, the President of India. at a reception he gave in Malik Ram's honour at Rashtrapati Bhavan, New Delhi in April 1972.

Jagan Nath Azad, the Urdu poet and an authority on Iqbal, had this to say about him in his review of the award-winning Tazkirah-i-Muasireen:

Malik Ram, an internationally-known authority on Ghalib, is a versatile man of letters. A legend in his own life-time, he has a remarkable capability to deal with many subjects. He is, at the same time, an essayist, a biographer, a memoir-writer, a literary critic, a research scholar as also an authority on Islamic literature and culture... Tazkirah-i-Muasireen is a work of encyclopaedic nature.

Two other publications in Urdu dwell on the life and works of Malik Ram, as seen by contemporary figures from the world of academia and by prominent Urdu writers of the day: Malik Namah (1987) edited by Bashir Hussain Zaidi and Malik Ram published by the Ghalib Institute in New Delhi, which also contains the text of tributes paid to Malik Ram at a function hosted by the Ghalib Institute in 1991, to celebrate his life in his 85th year. Ale Ahmad Suroor, the Urdu scholar and academic, who received the 1974 Sahitya Akademi Award for Urdu, describes him as a walking library.

Malik Ram, Qazi Abdul Wadood (1896–1984) and Imtiyaz Ali Khan 'Arshi' (1904–81) were the three leading Urdu research scholars for over five decades during the 20th century. All three shunned the limelight, regarding their research activities as a pleasurable, exciting and rewarding pursuit. Individually and collectively, they had established new benchmarks for Urdu literary research. Acknowledging their expertise and achievements in this field, the I.K. Gujral Committee Report on the status and promotion of Urdu, which was presented to both Houses of the Indian Parliament on 21 February 1979 stated:

"Urdu Historical Background – Progressive Writing" (2.81)

The great trio, Qazi Abdul Wadood, Malik Ram and Imtiyaz Ali 'Arshi', will be known not only for their research on Ghalib but also for giving our research a new depth and modern methodology. Accurate fixation of periods and dates is also one of their achievements.

To mark the first anniversary of his death, two Urdu monthly literary journals, Qaumi Zaban in Karachi and Aaj Kal in New Delhi, devoted their respective April 1994 editions to Malik Ram and his contribution to Urdu and Islamic literature. Some writers, who had known Malik Ram personally, added hitherto unpublished information about him in both journals. The "Malik Ram Number" as the Qaumi Zaban edition was called, and the Aaj Kal special issue also carried different versions of an article by Em Habib Khan (1931–1998), one of the very few people from the literary world, who had access to Malik Ram in the intensive care unit of the hospital in New Delhi where he died. Habib Khan has written a moving account of the last months of his life and of their last meeting.

In 1996, the Ghalib Academy in New Delhi published "Ghalib Shanas Malik Ram" (Ghalib Scholar Malik Ram) by Gyan Chand Jain, the Urdu writer and recipient of the 1982 Sahitya Akademi Award for Urdu. In this work, Jain recalls and examines Malik Ram's lifetime research on Ghalib and reflects on his literary legacy. This volume complements an earlier work published in 1975 by Shahid Azmi entitled "Urdu Tahqiq aur Malik Ram" (Urdu Research and Malik Ram ) one of the earliest books written about Malik Ram's contribution to Urdu research.

Malik Ram was a prolific letter writer. In 1997, Shamim Jahan published a collection of his letters, which also depict his literary style, in a volume entitled Khutut-i-Malik Ram.

In 2010, Muhammad Arshad published "Malik Ram: Hayat aur Karname" ( Malik Ram: Life and Work ) in Aligarh, India. In this volume, Malik Ram, the research scholar, has himself become the subject of research.

== Literary awards ==
Malik Ram received his first ever literary prize, a wrist-watch, for his essay in Urdu on 'Religion and Reason' which he wrote for a literary competition in 1925 in his student days. This award, suggests Ali Jawad Zaidi in Armaghan-i Malik always meant a lot to him.

Some significant Urdu Literary Awards (listed in Malik Namah – Malik Ram ki Adabi Khidmaat edited by Bashir Hussain Zaidi) :

Uttar Pradesh Government: for Gul-e-Raana (1971)

Uttar Pradesh Urdu Academy, Lucknow: for Tazkirah-e-Muasireen – Volume 1 (1973)

Uttar Pradesh Urdu Academy, Lucknow: for Woh Surten Ilahi (1974)

Sahitya Kala Parishad, Delhi: Urdu Award (1975)

Bihar Urdu Academy, Patna: for Tazkirah-e-Muasireen – Volume 2 (1975)

Ghalib Institute, New Delhi: Ghalib Award (1976)

Mir Academy, Lucknow: Imtiyaz-e Mir Award (1977)

Mir Academy, Lucknow: Iftikhar-e Mir Award (1981)

Uttar Pradesh Urdu Academy, Lucknow: for Tazkirah-e-Muasireen – Volume 4 (1982)

Sahitya Akademi Award for Tazkirah-e-Muasireen (Volume 4) (1983)

Urdu Academy, Delhi: for Talamiza-e-Ghalib (1984)

Bihar Urdu Academy, Patna: Services to Urdu Literature (1984/65)

Dr Zakir Hussain Urdu Prize: Urdu Literature and Research (1987)

List incomplete: Awards received between 1987 and Malik Ram's death in 1993 required.

== See also ==
- List of Indian writers
- Maulana Abul Kalam Azad
- Zakir Husain
