= Gopal Mittal =

Gopal Mittal گوپال مِتّل
- Born: Gopal Mittal; 1906; Malerkotla, India
- Died: 1993 (aged 86–87); Delhi, India
- Occupations: Poet, writer, journalist
- Known for: Nazms, Ghazals and Qat'aas

Gopal Mittal (1906–1993) (Urdu: گوپال مِتّل) was an Urdu poet, writer, critic and journalist.

== Biography ==
Gopal Mittal was born on 6 June 1906 in Malerkotla, Punjab Province, British India. His father, Walayati Ram Jain, was a renowned practitioner of Unani medicine. After completing his schooling in Malerkotla as a student of Malerkotla High School, and college education in 1932 as a student of Sanatan Dharma College, Lahore, he joined "Subah e Ummid" a newspaper published from Ludhiana that soon folded up. He then joined "Shahkar" published by Maulana Tajwar Najeebabadi from Lahore, and alongside also wrote for "Jagat Laxmi", a Film-magazine. He lived in Lahore till August 1947 and thereafter moved to Delhi where he worked for the Daily Urdu newspapers, "Milap" and "Tej". In 1953 he left this employment and started publication of Monthly Tahreek that he also edited. From 1956 to 1979, Makhmoor Saeedi was the Joint Editor of this magazine.

Gopal Mittal was 87 years old when he died in Delhi on 15 April 1993.

== Literary life ==
Gopal Mittal was a progressive writer and a creative writer. He has written some of the finest verses on "man and his destiny." "His complete works published in 1994 contain a rich fare of ghazals, nazms and qatas besides diadactic and religious verses." He was a more fluent writer of nazms. Till date four collections of his nazms, ghazals and qatas have come to light, they are – 1) Dorahaa, 2) Saharaa Mein Azaan, 3) Sharaar e naghmaa and 4) Sachche Bole. He had also penned his memoirs titled – Lahore kaa jo zikr kiyaa (ISBN 9789693515428). His complete works, titled Kulliyaat e Gopal Mittal, were published after his demise.

His life and works were commented upon and appraised by leading poets and writers – Jagan Nath Azad, Makhmur Saeedi, Wazir Agha, Balraj Komal, Hamidi Kashmiri, Bani, Hayatullah Ansari, Rashid Hasan Khan, Azad Gulati, Krishan Mohan, Zia Fatehabadi and Nazir Siddiqi, whose assessments were compiled and edited by Kumar Pashi and published in 1983 titled Gopal Mittal – shakhsiyat aur fan (ISBN 9788180421815). Earlier a similar earlier exercise conducted and later on compiled by Muhammad Abdulhakim titled Gopal Mittal – ek mutalia was published by Nazish Book Centre in 1977. In 2005 an appraisal of his poetry conducted by Ziyauddin was published titled Gopal Mittal: Shakhs Va Shair.

== Bibliography ==
Urdu Poetry:

- Doraahaa (1944)
- Saharaa mein azaan (1970)
- Sharaar e naghmaa (1984)
- Sachche Bole (1988)
- Kulliyaat e Gopal Mittal (1994)

Memoirs:

- Lahore ka jo zikr kiya
