= Chandpur, Bijnor =

Chandpur
- Town
- Location in Uttar Pradesh, India
- Coordinates: 29°08′06″N 78°16′15″E
- Country: India
- State: Uttar Pradesh
- District: Bijnor

Government
  - Type: Municipal council
- Elevation: 51 m (167 ft)

Population (2011)
  - Total: 83,441

Languages
  - Official: Hindi
- Time zone: UTC+5:30 (IST)
- PIN: 246725
- Telephone code: 01345
- Vehicle registration: UP-20

Chandpur is a town and a municipal board (nagar palika parishad) in Bijnor district in the Indian state of Uttar Pradesh, India.

== Geography ==
Chandpur has an average elevation of 51 metres (167 feet).

Chandpur is located at a distance of 130 km from the capital of New Delhi, 65 km from Meerut, and 38 km from Gajraula on National Highway 9. The Bijnor district is bordered by the districts of Meerut, Muzzafarnagar, Moradabad, Jyotibaphule Nagar of Uttar Pradesh & Haridwar, Pauri Garhwal, Udham Singh Nagar and Nainital of Uttarakhand. River Ganga flows at a distance of 20 km from Chandpur.

== Demographics ==
As of 2011, according to the India census, Chandpur has a population of 83,441 of which 43,354 are males while 40,087 are females. The population of children ages 0-6 is 12390 which is 14.85% of total population of Chandpur (NPP). The female sex ratio is 925 against state average of 912. Moreover, the child sex ratio in Chandpur is around 923 compared to Uttar Pradesh state average of 902. The literacy rate of Chandpur city is 70.15% higher than the state average of 67.68%. In Chandpur, male literacy is around 74.73% while the female literacy rate is 65.20%.

=== Religion ===
Religion data as per Census 2011:

- Muslim : 71.77%
- Hindu: 27.43%
- Christian: 0.14%
- Sikh: 0.50%

=== Post office ===
Chandpur city pin code is 246725. It has two post offices in the city and many box offices.

== Transport ==
Chandpur has railway connections to New Delhi, Lucknow, Saharanpur, Roorkee, Chandigarh, Dehradun, Ghaziabad, Najibabad, Moradabad etc. There are direct bus services between Chandpur and a number of other cities and schools.

- Mussoorie Express
- Garhwal Express
- lucknow chandigarh express
- Najibabad-aligarh passenger
- Najibabad-gajrula passenger

There are direct bus services between New Delhi and Chandpur, with buses connecting to the Anand Vihar bus stand in New Delhi and some other bus stop at Delhi

- Anand Vihar
- Okhla
- Shadra
- Delhi
- Mayur vihar phase 1
- Noida City Centre
- Hauz Khas Village
- Botanical Garden (Noida sec 37)

There are direct bus services between

- saharanpur—chandpur
- ghaziabaad—chandpur
- Bijnor-Chandpur
- haridwaar—chandpur
- aligarh—chandpur
- meerut—chandpur
- bareilly—chandpur
- moradabad-chandpur
- najibabbad—chandpur
- Kanpur—chandpur
- Jhansi—chandpur
- Azamgarh—chandpur
- agra—chandpur
- Dehradun-chandpur

== People from Chandpur ==
- Atma Ram (scientist)
- Subhash C. Kashyap
- Maulana Murtaza Hasan Chandpuri
- Raashid Alvi
- Vishal Bhardwaj
- Kausar Chandpuri (1900–1990), Indian physician and writer
- Qayem Chandpuri (1722–1793), Indian poet
- Raaz Chandpuri (1892–1969), Indian Urdu writer and literary critic

== See also ==
- Chandpuri
