= Chandpur, Bhopal =

Chandpur
- village
- Location within Madhya Pradesh Location within India
- Coordinates: 23.3401791°N 77.3640257°E
- Country: India
- State: Madhya Pradesh
- District: Bhopal
- Tehsil: Huzur
- Elevation: 499 m (1,637 ft)

Population (2011)
  - Total: 499
- Time zone: UTC+5:30 (IST)
- ISO 3166 code: MP-IN
- 2011 census code: 482370

Chandpur is a village in the Bhopal district of Madhya Pradesh, India. It is located in the Huzur tehsil and the Phanda block.

== Demographics ==
According to the 2011 census of India, Chandpur has 109 households. The effective literacy rate (i.e. the literacy rate of population excluding children aged 6 and below) is 69.23%.

Demographics (2011 Census)
	Total	Male	Female
Population	499	269	230
Children aged below 6 years	83	46	37
Scheduled caste	138	69	69
Scheduled tribe	0	0	0
Literates	288	179	109
Workers (all)	262	142	120
Main workers (total)	140	122	18
Main workers: Cultivators	62	58	4
Main workers: Agricultural labourers	36	29	7
Main workers: Household industry workers	1	1	0
Main workers: Other	41	34	7
Marginal workers (total)	122	20	102
Marginal workers: Cultivators	34	4	30
Marginal workers: Agricultural labourers	87	15	72
Marginal workers: Household industry workers	0	0	0
Marginal workers: Others	1	1	0
Non-workers	237	127	110
