= Makhmoor Saeedi =

Urdu author

Makhmoor Saeedi مخمور سعیدی
- Born: 1938; Tonk, India
- Died: 2010 (aged 71–72); Jaipur, India
- Occupations: Poet, writer, translator, journalist
- Known for: Nazms, Ghazals and qataas

Makhmoor Saeedi (31 December 1938 – 2 March 2010) (Urdu: مخمور سعیدی) was an Urdu poet, writer, translator and journalist from Tonk, Rajasthan, India.

== Biography ==
Makhmoor Saeedi was born on 31 December 1938 in Tonk, India. His father, Ahmed Khan Nazish was also an Urdu poet of repute. After completing his school-studies he graduated from Agra University. After graduation he moved to Delhi.

From 1956 to 1979, he worked as Joint Editor of Monthly Tahreek, published by Gopal Mittal. Thereafter, he edited Nigar, Aiwan e Urdu and Umang, and was also the Secretary of Urdu Akademi, Delhi. He joined National Council for Promotion of Urdu Language, an autonomous body under the HRD ministry in 1998 as literary advisor and edited research journal quarterly "Fikr o Tahqeeq". He was also honorary editor of NCPUL's news and views magazine monthly Urdu Duniya. He died in Jaipur, Rajasthan, on 2 March 2010 and was buried in Tonk.

== Literary life ==
Makhmoor Saeedi wrote his first poem in 1948 when he was ten years old. He soon mastered the technique of writing Urdu poetry and excelled at writing Ghazals and Nazms in the conventional rhymed formats as well as in unrhymed blank and free-verse. He was greatly influenced by Mohammad Iqbal, Akhtar Sheerani and Josh Malihabadi. He is considered one of the preeminent practitioners of modern poetry in Urdu alongside Basheer Badr, Ali Sardar Jafri and Kaifi Azmi.

He was the poet of real earthy love and beauty who also wrote qataas, rubais, geets and dohas. His twenty publications include Sabrang, Seah bar Safed, Awaz ke jism, Wahid Mutakallam, Aate jaate lamhon ki sadaa, Guftani, Deewar o dar ke darmiaan and Rasta aur main.

Rasta aur main earned him the 2007 Sahitya Akademi Award.

An appraisal of his life and works compiled by Sheen Kaaf Nizam titled Bheed mein akelaa was published by the Rajasthan Urdu Akademi in 2007.

== Bibliography ==
Urdu poetry:

- Sabrang
- Seah bar Safed
- Awaz ke jism
- Wahid Mutakallam
- Aate jaate lamhon ki sada
- Guftani
- Deewar o dar ke darmiaan
- Rasta aur main
- Ghar kahin gum ho gayaa
- Perh girta huaa
- Sheerazah
