= Chandrapur, Guwahati =

Town in Assam, India

Chandrapur is a small town located approximately 15 km from Guwahati in the State of Assam in India.

Chandrapur is covered by hills, and it is primarily an industrial area. ASEB Thermal plant is one of the major industrial plants in Chandrapur. NTC plant was closed and ASFC Ltd factory in running condition. The town is close to two wildlife sanctuaries, Pobitora and Amchang Wildlife sanctuary. Hanuman Food Products (Muri-Chira Mill), Hanuman Bricks are the major Industries running in the area contributing largely to the Revenue. It is situated near Brahmaputra river.
