= Chandi (name) =

Chandi is a given name and surname. Notable people with the name include:

== Given name ==
- Chandi Jones, American basketball player
- Chandi Prasad Bhatt, Indian environmentalist
- Chandi Lahiri (1931–2018), Indian journalist
- Chandi Prasad Mohanty, Indian army officer
- Chandi Moore, American health specialist and activist
- Chandi Wickramasinghe (born 1983), Sri Lankan cricketer

== Surname ==
- Gurwinder Singh Chandi, Indian field hockey player
- Preet Chandi (born 1988/1989), British Army medical officer
