= Khushtar Girami =

Khushtar Girami (1902–1988) (Urdu: خوشتر گرامی, Hindi: ख़ुश्तर गिरामी, romanized: Xuśtar Girāmī), born Ram Rakha Mal Chadda, was a renowned Urdu writer and poet. He is more remembered as the editor of the then India’s leading Urdu Monthly Biswin Sadi which he also owned. He started publication of this magazine from Lahore in 1937, and later shifted to Delhi. He is credited with having introduced numerous budding Urdu and Hindi poets, short-story writers, novelists, essayists and literary critics. All renowned Urdu poets and writers were proud regular contributors to Biswin Sadi. His service to Urdu language is unforgettable. In 1977 he sold this magazine to Rehman Nayyar, the erstwhile owner and editor of Ruby, to lead a retired life. His book titled Sihat Aur Zindagi published by Book Home in 1980 (reprinted in 2005), is a popular book on this subject.

Khushtar Girami is survived by 2 sons Krishan Kumar Chadda and Vijay Chadda both based in New Delhi. And a daughter Kamal Sabharwal based in California.
