= Chandrapur, Bagnan I =

Chandrapur
- Census Town
- Location in West Bengal, India Chandrapur (India)
- Coordinates: 22.4680377°N 87.984689°E
- Country: India
- State: West Bengal
- District: Howrah

Population (2011)
  - Total: 4,732

Languages
  - Official: Bengali, English
- Time zone: UTC+5:30 (IST)
- Postal code: 711303
- ISO 3166 code: IN-WB
- Vehicle registration: WB
- Lok Sabha constituency: Uluberia
- Vidhan Sabha constituency: Bagnan
- Website: howrah.gov.in

Chandrapur is a census town in Bagnan I CD Block in Howrah district in the state of West Bengal, in eastern India.
