= Kashmiri Lal Zakir =

Indian writer (1919–2016)

- Born: 7 April 1919; Gujrat District, British India
- Died: 31 August 2016 (aged 97); Chandigarh, India
- Occupation: Writer
- Years active: 1940s–2016
- Known for: Ghazal
- Awards: Padma Shri; Fakhr-e-Haryana
- Website: Official blog

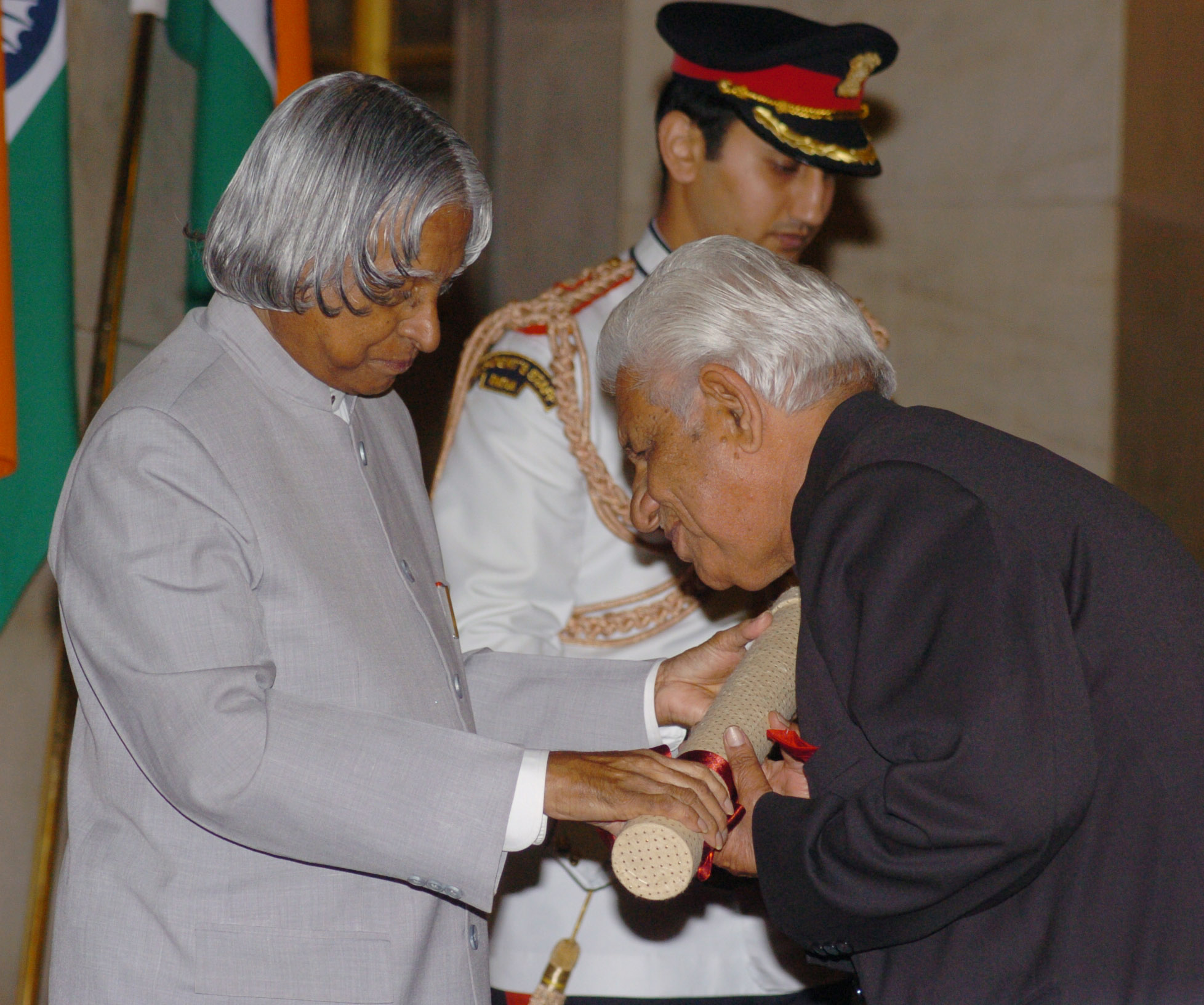
The President, Dr. A.P.J. Abdul Kalam presenting Padma Shri to Shri Kashmiri Lal Zakir, educationist and pioneer in adult literacy schemes, at investiture ceremony in New Delhi on March 29, 2006

Kashmiri Lal Zakir (7 April 1919 – 31 August 2016) was an Indian poet, novelist, dramatist and short story writer of Urdu literature.

His career—which started with his first ghazal published in Adabi Duniya, a publication from Lahore, in the 1940s—encompasses novels, dramas, short stories and travelogues.

Zakir served the Punjab Education Department in then British India and had been involved with Haryana Urdu Academy for a number of years as its chairman. He has written in Hindi and Urdu, including Tin cihre ek saval, a ghazal anthology, Ab Mujhey Sone Do, a novel and Aey Mao Behno Betiyo, a collection of articles.

Zakir is a recipient of the honour of Fakhr-e-Haryana from the Government of Haryana. The Government of India awarded him the fourth highest civilian honour of the Padma Shri, in 2006, for his contributions to Indian literature.

Zakir died on 31 August 2016 at the age of 97.
