= Chandipur, Bangladesh =

Chandipur(চণ্ডীপুর), Bangladesh চণ্ডীপুর চণ্ডীপুর
- Location in Bangladesh
- Coordinates: 22°47′N 90°20′E
- Country: Bangladesh
- Division: Barisal Division
- District: Barisal District
- Time zone: UTC+6 (Bangladesh Time)

Chandipur(চণ্ডীপুর), Bangladesh is a village in Barisal District in the Barisal Division of southern-central Bangladesh.
