= Chandi, Brahmanbaria =

Village in Chittagong, Bangladesh

Coordinates: 23°53′N 90°03′E

Chandi is a village of Brahmanbaria Sadar Upazila in Brahmanbaria District under Chittagong Division of Bangladesh.
