= Kausar Chandpuri =

Indian Writer

Kausar Chandpuri کوثر چاندپوری
- Born: Ali Kausar; 8 August 1900; Chandpur, District Bijnor, Uttar Pradesh, India
- Died: 13 June 1990 (aged 89); Delhi, India
- Occupations: Physician, writer
- Known for: Poetry and fiction

Kausar Chandpuri (8 August 1900 – 13 June 1990) was an Indian Unani physician and Urdu writer who gained repute as a novelist, short story writer and literary critic.

== Biography ==
Kausar Chandpuri was the takhallus of Ali Kausar who was born on 8 August 1900 at Chandpur, District Bijnor, Uttar Pradesh, India. He studied Unani medicine at Princess Asifa Tibbia College, Bhopal. Thereafter, he worked at Unani Shifakhana, Bhopal, from where he retired as Afsur-ul-Atibba. Later on he moved to Delhi and joined Hamdard Nursing Home. He died in Delhi on 13 June 1990.

== Literary life ==
Kausar Chandpuri wrote seventeen novels, fourteen collections of short-stories, four books of literary criticism and six books on satire. He was a fluent writer of Urdu Prose. He held the view that short stories should seek to improve the standards of morality. His book, Jahan e Ghalib, which was written in response to Malik Ram's Zikr e Ghalib, dealt with the darker side of Ghalib's character and life, and is a classic. He also wrote articles and books on Unani medicine, practice and history (such as on the development of Unani medicines and treatments during the reign of the Mughals). He also brought to light a ninth-century manuscript, Danish Namah e Jahan, which was reproduced in the book Studies in the History of Medicine 4 (1980), pages 53–56. His major works are Jahaan e Ghalib, Atibba e ahd e Mughliyaa, Raakh aur Kaliyaan, Patthar kaa gulaab, Murjhaii kaliyaan, Karvaan hamaaraa, Hakim Ajmal Khan, Fikr o sh’uur and Didah e binaa.

Zafar Ahmed Nizami published an appraisal of the life and works of Kausar Chandpuri, entitled Kausar Chandpuri (ISBN 9788126025374). Obaidur Rehman Hashmi's article, "Kausar Chandpuri ki Afsana Nigari", which evaluates Kausar Chandpuri's Urdu short stories, is included in Altaf Ahmed Azmi's book Tibbe Unani.

== Bibliography ==
Kausar Chandpuri's books include:

- Mehakatii bahaaren
- Pyasii nadiyaa
- Dilchasp afsaane
- Goongaa hai Bhagwaan
- Atibba e ahd e Mughliyaa
- Hakeem Ajmal Khan
- Murjhaaii kaliyaan
- Md. Bairam Khan
- Raakh aur kaliyaan
- Patthar kaa gulaab
- Didah e binaa
- Kaarwaan hamaaraa
- Fikr o sh’uur
- Muskarahaten
