= Raaz Chandpuri =

Indian poet and literary critic

Raaz Chandpuri (born Mohammad Sadiq; 189a2-1969) was an Indian poet and literary critic, known for writing Urdu ghazal and nazm. He was amongst the earliest disciples of Seemab Akbarabadi and attained the status of an Ustaad for himself. He was a master of Urooz.

His first known collection of ghazals, Nawa e Raaz, was published in 1961 by Adara Anees of Allahabad. However, he is better known for his critical appraisal of the life and work of Seemab Akbarabadi, Dastaan e chand, on which exercise Mehr Lal Soni Zia Fatehabadi too had relied while writing the biography of Seemab Akbarabadi titled - " Zikr e Seemab ".

Written by Sarwar Alam Raz Sarwar and published by Kitab Ghar, Baqiyaat e Raaz is the only critical appraisal of the life and work of Raaz Chandpuri.
