= Seemab Akbarabadi =

Indian-born Pakistani Urdu poet (1882–1951)

- Born: Aashiq Hussain Siddiqui; 5 June 1880; Agra, North-Western Provinces, British India
- Died: 31 January 1951 (aged 70) Karachi, Federal Capital Territory, Pakistan
- Genres: Qat'aa, Rubai, Ghazal, Nazm, Noha, Salaam, essays. short stories, novels, biographies and translations.
- Occupations: Poet, writer, publisher

Seemab Akbarabadi (Urdu: سیماب اکبرآبادی) born Aashiq Hussain Siddiqui (Urdu: عاشق حسین صدیقی, 5 June 1880 – 31 January 1951) was an Urdu poet, who was born in Agra, Uttar Pradesh, India and who later moved to Pakistan after partition.

== Early life ==
Seemab Akbarabadi, (born Aashiq Hussain Siddiqui), a descendant of Abu Bakr, the first Caliph of Islam, was born in Imliwale Makaan of Kakoo Gali, Nai Mandi, Agra, as the eldest son of Mohammad Hussain Siddiqui, who was himself an Urdu poet, author of several books, a disciple of Hakim Amiruddin Attaar Akbarabadi, and an employee of the Times of India Press, Ajmer. Seemab had said that his forefather had migrated from Bukhara sometime during the reign of the Mughal Emperor Jahangir and made Agra their home. However, according to Mohan Lal his great-grandfather had migrated from Bukhara during Aurangzeb's reign.

== Literary career ==
Seemab began ghazal writing in 1892 and in 1898 became a disciple of Nawab Mirza Khan Daagh Dehlawi (1831–1905) to whom he was personally introduced by Munshi Nazar Hussain Sakhaa Dehlawi at the Kanpur Railway Station.

After founding "Qasr-ul-adab" in 1923 with Saghar Nizami as its editor, he started publishing the Monthly "Paimana". In 1929, he started the Weekly "Taj" and in 1930 the Monthly Shair. The publication of "Paimana" ceased in 1932 when Saghar Nizami separated from Seemab and moved to Meerut. Shair continued to be published long after Seemab’s death, managed and edited (since 1935) by his son, Aijaz Siddiqi, and "Wahi-e-manzoom" published by his son Mazhar Siddiqui from Karachi won a Hijra Award on 27 Ramzan by the President of Pakistan, General Zia-Ul-Haq.

Seemab never enjoyed a comfortable financial position, yet he always appeared immaculately dressed in a neat sherwani and white wide pajama with a Turkish topi covering his head. He did not have a beard. Seemab wrote in all literary formats and on various social and political topics. In 1948, he went to Lahore and then to Karachi in an unsuccessful search for a publisher for his monumental work, "Wahi-e-Manzoom", an Urdu translation in verse form of the Quran. Seemab did not return to Agra. In 1949 he suffered a massive paralytic stroke from which he never recovered and he died on 31 January 1951.

== Works ==
Beginning with the publication of his first collection of poems," Naistaan" in 1923, Akbarabadi published seventy-five books throughout his life. These included twenty-two books of poetry, not including "Loh-e-mahfooz" (1979), "Wahi-e-manzoom" (1981) and "Saaz-e-hijaz" (1982), all published long after his death. He is best known for his ghazals particularly by those sung by Kundan Lal Saigal. He also wrote short stories, novels, dramas, biographies and critical appraisals in Urdu, Persian and Arabic.

== Scholarship ==
Works on Akbarabadi's life and literary contributions include:

- "Dastan-e-chand" written by Raaz Chandpuri
- "Islah-ul-islah" by Abr Ahasani Gunnauri
- "Khumkhana-e-Javed " Vol 4 by Lala Sri Ram
- "Zikr-e-Seemab" and "Seemab banaam Zia", both by Mehr Lal Soni Zia Fatehabadi
- "Seemab Akbarabadi " by Manohar Sahai Anwar
- "Rooh-e-Mukatib" by Saghar Nizami
- "Seemab Ki Nazmiya" Shayari by Zarina Sani
- "Seemab aur Dabistan-e-Seemab " by Iftikhar Ahmed Fakhar

Among the writers and poets that he influenced were Raaz Chandpuri, Saghar Nizami and Mohsin Bhopali.

== Partial bibliography ==
He wrote "about 200 works of prose and poetry", which include:

- Naistan (1923)
- Ilhaam-e-manzoom (1928)
- Kaar-e-imroz (1934)
- Kaleem-e-ajam (1936)
- Dastur-ul-islah (1940)
- Saaz-o-aahang (1941)
- Krishna Gita (1942)
- Aalam Aashob (1943)
- Sadrah almantaha (1946)
- Sher-e-inqlaab ( 1947)
- Loh-e-mahfooz (1979)
- Wahi-e-manzoom (1981)

== Sources ==
- http://www.urdupoetry.com/seemab.html
- Archived List of Famous Urdu Poets of Pakistan and India
- http://www.kavitakosh.org/seemab
- Seemab Akbarabadi at Jakhira (Hindi)
