= Chandpur, Hailakandi =

Chandpur
- Location in Assam, India
- Coordinates: 24.704°N 92.530°E
- Country: India
- State: Assam
- District: Hailakandi district
- Circle: Hailakandi

Population (2011)
  - Total: 2,446

Languages
  - Official: Bengali and slyheti)language (sylheti)
- Time zone: UTC+5:30 (IST)

Chandpur is a village in Hailakandi district of Assam state of India.

Bengali and slyheti (slyheti) are the official languages of this place.

== See also ==
- Hailakandi district
