= Abr Ahasani Gunnauri =

Indian poet (1897–1973)

- Born: Ahmed Baksh; 1897; Gunnaur, India
- Died: 8 November 1973 (aged 75–76); Gunnaur, India
- Occupation: Poet

Abr Ahsani Gunnauri (1897 – 8 November 1973) was an Indian poet who wrote ghazal and nazm in Urdu. According to one writer, he was a disciple of Ahasan Maarharvi who was a disciple of Mirza Khan Daagh Dehlvi, and he had a direct influence on more than a hundred of poets and belonged to the Baháʼí Faith, for instance writing poems in honor of Tahirih.

== Biography ==
Abr Ahasani Gunnauri, whose birth name was Ahmed Baksh, was born in 1897 at Gunnaur, Dist. Badaun, Uttar Pradesh, India, as the son of Nabi Baksh who was a Zamindar of Gunnaur. In 1953, he retired from the service of Oriental College, Rampur, where he taught Urdu and Persian. After retirement he returned to Gunnaur where he was murdered on 8 November 1973 by unknown and untraced assailants.

== Literary life ==
Abr Ahasani commenced writing Urdu poetry at the age of nine years when he wrote a Naʻat in the ghazal form. In his early days he consulted Munshi Sakhawat Hussain Sakha Shahjahanpuri but later on became a disciple of Ahasan Maarharvi. From 1947 to 1953 he had also published and edited the Monthly Ahasan, Rampur.

Thus far, three collections of his ghazals viz. Nageene (1952), Qareene (1963) and Khazeene (1971) have been published. A collection of his nazms titled Safeene was published in 1952. A few nazms written by him are also included in Khazeene. In addition thereto he had also penned critical work titled Meri Islaahen in two volumes, the first volume of this work was published in 1956 and the second volume, in 1966, Earlier, in 1949 his critical work, Islah ul islah, which was in response to Dastur ul islah (1940) written by Seemab Akbarabadi, was published that had made him famous in the Urdu world.

His students include – Fareed Siddiqui Rampuri (author of " Aayina-e- Rampur", "Jagtey Khwab","Shaqqul-Qamar"), Shauq Asari Rampuri, Taskheer Fehami, Masoodah Hayat (author of Buye Suman 1981), Parkash Nath Parvez, Saefi Premi (author of Ismail Meeruthi, hayat aur khidmat) and Unwan Chishti.

== Bibliography ==
- Islah ul islah (1949)
- Nageene (1952)
- Safeene (1952)
- Meri Islaahen Volume 1 (1956)
- Qareene (1963)
- Meri Islaahen Volume 2 (1966)
