= Changdi =

Mountain in Nepal and China

- Lalung
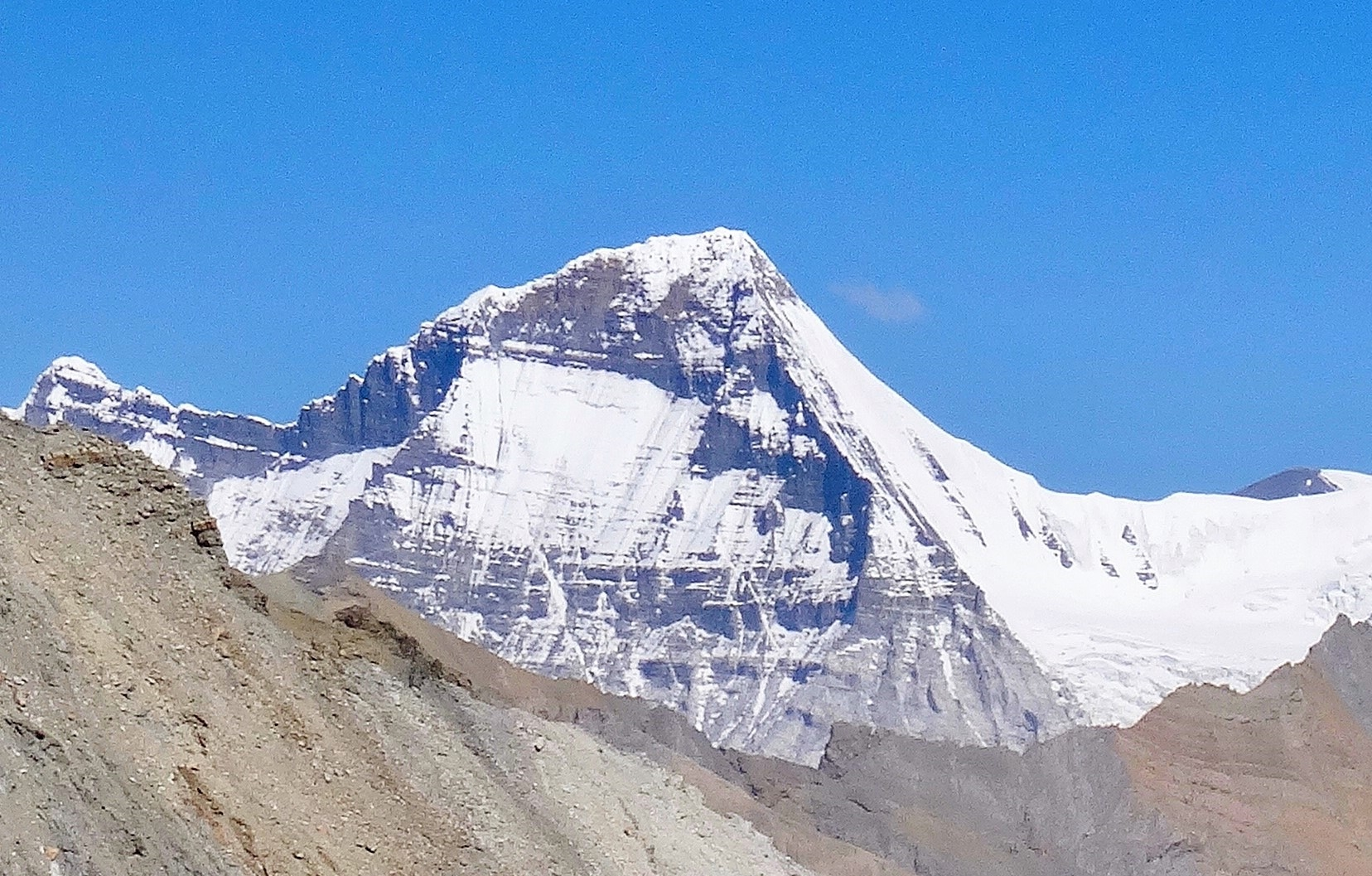
- South aspect

Highest point
- Elevation: 6,623 m (21,729 ft)
- Isolation: 7 km (4.3 mi)
- Coordinates: 29°43′09″N 82°47′55″E

Geography
- Location within Nepal Location within Tibet
- Interactive map of Changdi
- Location: China–Nepal border
- Countries: Nepal and China
- Province: Karnali
- District: Mugu
- Protected area: Shey Phoksundo National Park
- Parent range: Himalayas

Climbing
- First ascent: Unclimbed

Changdi, also known as Chāṅdi̇̄ or Lalung, is a mountain in Nepal and China.

== Description ==
Changdi is a 6,623-metre (21,729-foot) summit on the northern boundary of Shey Phoksundo National Park in the Himalayas. It is set on the border shared by the Karnali Province and Tibet. Precipitation runoff from the mountain's southern slopes drains into tributaries of the Karnali River, whereas the northern slope drains into the Maquan River drainage basin of Tibet. Topographic relief is significant as the summit rises 1,420 metres (4,660 ft) in one kilometre (0.62 mi) along the south slope. This remote, unclimbed mountain was first photographed in 1997 from Tibet by a Japanese expedition who were making a reconnaissance of Kaqur Kangri, seven kilometres (4.3 mi) to the northwest. This mountain is not to be confused with the Chandi Himal range which is approximately 100 km to the northwest.

== Climate ==
Based on the Köppen climate classification, Changdi is located in a tundra climate zone with cold, snowy winters, and cool summers. Weather systems are forced upwards by the Himalaya mountains (orographic lift), causing heavy precipitation in the form of rainfall and snowfall. This climate supports glaciers on the peak's north and east slopes. Mid-June through early-August is the monsoon season. The months of April, May, September, October, and November offer the most favorable weather for viewing or climbing this peak.

== Gallery ==
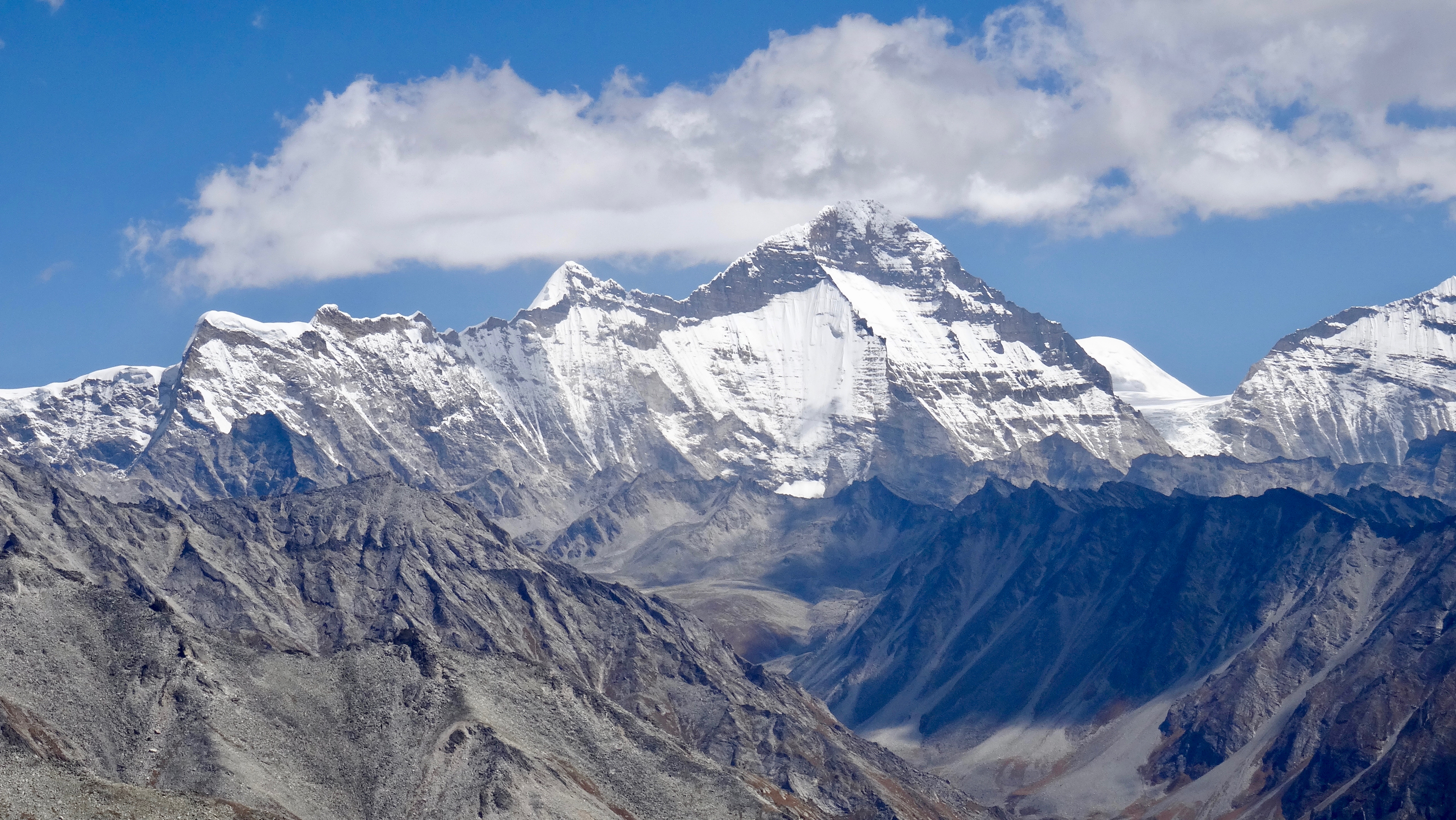
Changdi from southwest

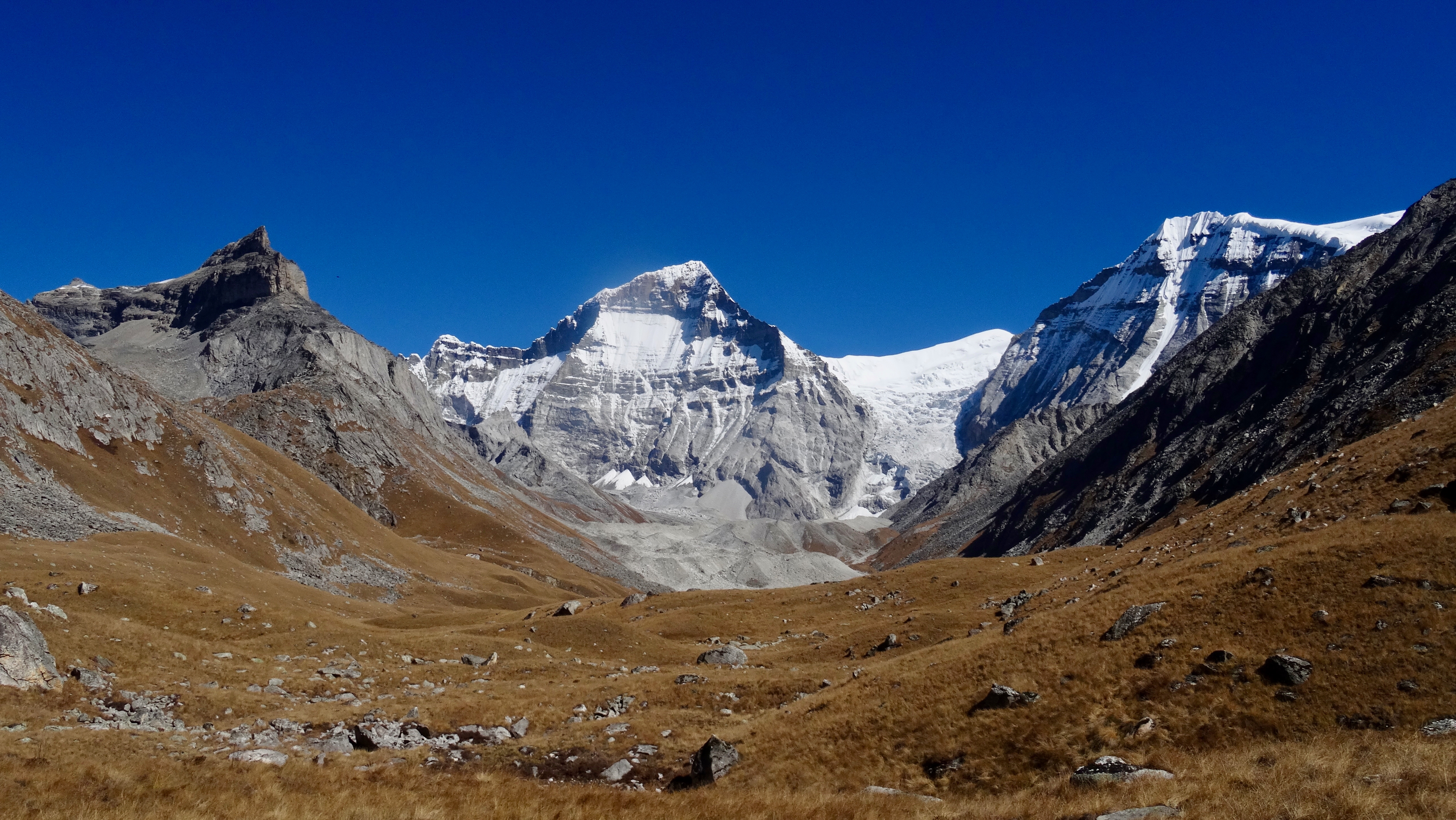
Changdi centered

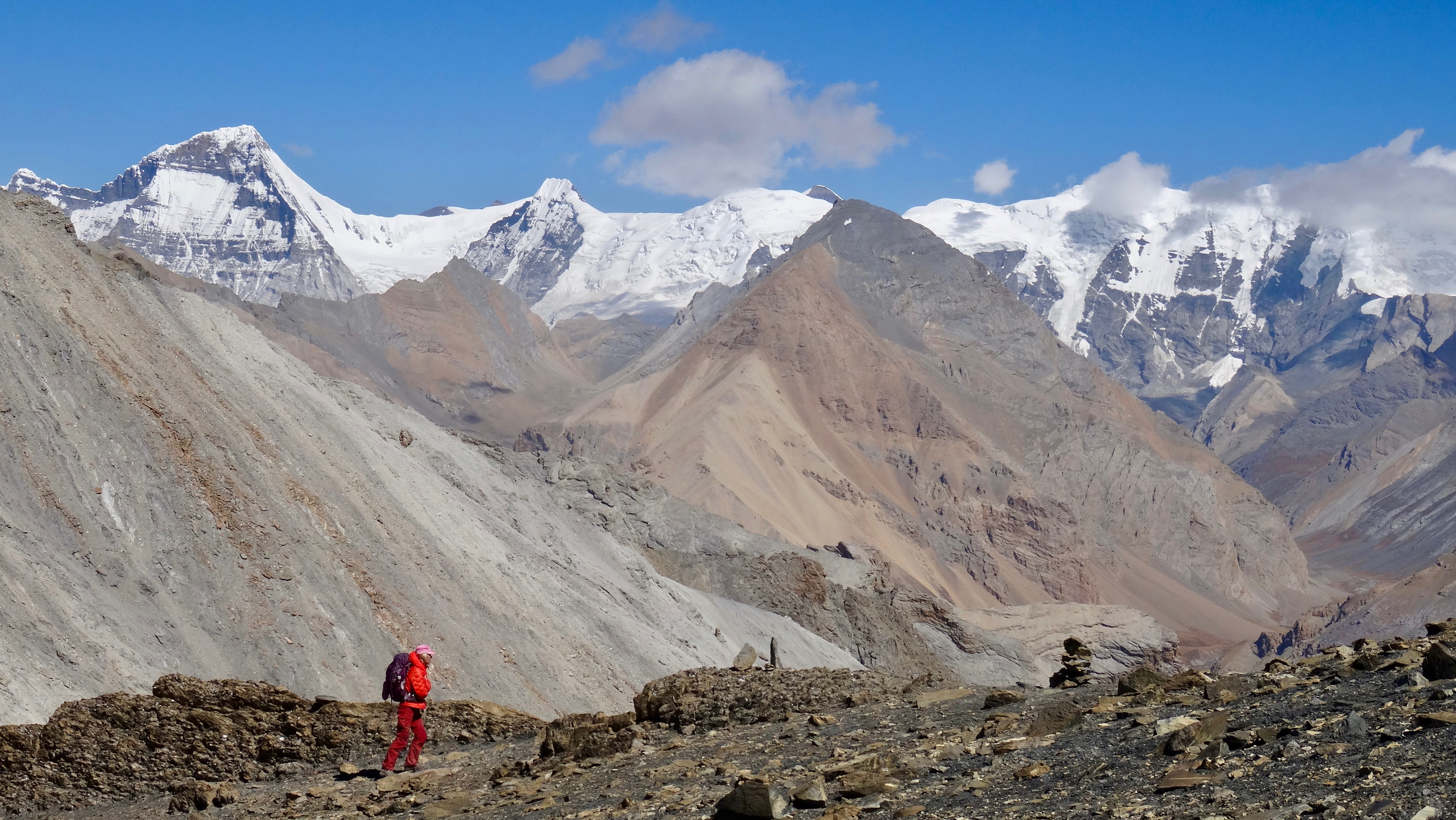
Changdi in upper left corner

== See also ==
- Geology of the Himalayas
