= Shair =

Oldest Urdu-language literary magazine, based in Mumbai, India

- Editor: Iftikhar Imam Siddiqui
- Categories: Literary magazine
- First issue: 14 February 1930; 96 years ago
- Country: India
- Language: Urdu

Shair (Urdu: شاعر) is the oldest Urdu-language literary magazine, based in Mumbai, India. It was launched in Agra in 1930 by the famous poet Seemab Akbarabadi. Its editor-in-chief is the poet, writer and journalist Iftikhar Imam Siddiqui, and the assistant editors are his two brothers, Noaman Siddiqui and Hamid Iqbal Siddiqui.

== History ==
Shair was founded on 14 February 1930, in Agra, India, by Iftikhar Imam Siddiqui's grandfather Seemab Akbarabadi, with the purpose of providing guidance and a platform to help new poets be published. After the partition of India, Akbarabadi migrated to Pakistan in 1948 and never returned.

Aijaz Siddiqui, the second son of Akbarabadi and the father of Iftikhar Imam Siddiqui, took charge of the magazine. In 1951 he also moved with his family to Mumbai where he continued to publish the Shair. After the death of Aijaz Siddiqui, Iftikhar Imam Siddiqui became its editor, who is himself a good poet and good at editing and writing.

Shair has introduced many old and new poets and writers. Shair's literary family has been admired and appreciated throughout Urdu literary figures for its best work and efforts.

== See also ==
- List of magazines in India
