= N.L. Upadhyaya =

Indian politician and trade unionist (died 1989)

N.L. Upadhyaya (died 1989) was an India politician and trade unionist. In 1942 he founded the branch of the Communist Party of India in Mysore State.

In 1964, he became a member of the Central Committee of the Communist Party of India (Marxist). He was a member of the Karnataka State Secretariat of the party and vice president of the Coffee Board Labour Union.

Upadhyaya died on 26 May 1989.
