= Marxist League (India) =

The Marxist League was a political grouping in Bombay, India. The League was founded by the middle of 1933 as an open front of the illegal Communist Party of India amongst middle class elements and intellectuals. The League substituted previous associations functioning amongst intellectuals, the 'Marxist Students Club' (organised in 1930 by S.V. Deshpande) and the 'Friends of the Soviet Union' (organised in May 1932). G.V. Haria played a leading role in organising the League. The League ran study classes and arranged public meetings in the city during 1933–1934. Attendees at its meetings included leading communists such as B.F. Bradley, S.V. Ghate, S.S. Mirajkar and K.N. Joglekar.

The draft programme of the Marxist League read: "…It is the rule of the Marxist League to spread the interest in Marxism, especially amongst middle class intellectuals, and create a band of trained Marxist intellectuals who will take up the ideological fight against imperialist and National Reformists and at the same time work in closest cooperation with the revolutionary movement of the masses of workers and peasants. …", "…It therefore appeals to all thinking intellectuals, who being dissatisfied with the tactics of the Indian National Congress, wish to participate in a genuine anti-Imperialist movement of the masses for complete independence of India from imperialism, for the establishment of a Workers' and Peasants' Government in India, to join the League and actively participate in its activities and to broaden and deepen the same."
