= Philip Spratt =

Anglo-Indian activist and writer (1902–1971)

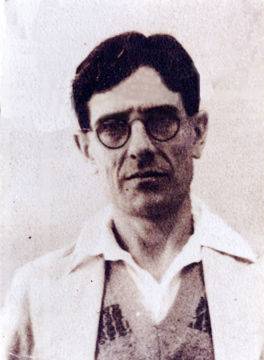

Personal details
- Born: 26 September 1902 Camberwell, England
- Died: 8 March 1971 (aged 68) Madras, India
- Party: Communist Party of India; Radical Democratic Party
- Spouse: Seetha
- Relatives: Aamir Khan (grandson-in law)
- Occupation: Freedom fighter

Philip Spratt (26 September 1902 – 8 March 1971) was a British writer and intellectual. Initially a communist sent by the British arm of the Communist International (Comintern), based in Moscow, to spread Communism in India, he subsequently became a friend and colleague of M. N. Roy, founder of the Communist parties in Mexico and India, and along with him became a communist activist.

He was a founding member of the Communist Party of India, and was among the chief accused in the Meerut Conspiracy Case; he was arrested on 20 March 1929 and imprisoned.

As a result of his reading during his time in jail, and also his observation of political developments in Russia and Western Europe at the time, Philip Spratt renounced Communism in the early 1930s. After India gained independence from the British, he was among the lone voices – such as Sita Ram Goel – against the well-intentioned and fashionable leftist policies of Nehru and the Indian government.

He was the Editor of MysIndia, a pro-American weekly, and later of Swarajya, a newspaper run by C. Rajagopalachari. He was also a prolific writer of books, articles and pamphlets on a variety of subjects, and translated books in French, German, Tamil, Sanskrit, and Hindi, into English.

== Early life, University and early Communist activity ==
Philip Spratt was born in Camberwell on 26 September 1902 to Herbert Spratt, a schoolmaster, and Norah Spratt. He was one of five boys. His elder brother David Spratt, left boarding school to join the British Army during World War I, and was killed at Passchendaele in 1917. Although raised a Baptist, Herbert Spratt later joined the Church of England. Philip Spratt's own rejection of religion came early on:

"By the age of 17 I had a fair knowledge of nineteenth-century physical science, and I read a little on my own in biology. On Sunday evenings after church I used to take a fast walk round the neighbourhood, and for some months on these walks I argued with myself about science and religion. I decided quite definitely that the religious theory of things was unsound. But I remember no 'conflict' or emotion over my rejection of religion. I kept it entirely to myself, and I still attended church, and continued to do so till I went to the university."

Philip Spratt won a university scholarship in 1921 to study mathematics at Downing College, Cambridge. He wrote in his memoirs: "But I was in no mood to devote myself to my proper studies, or to associate with the dull dogs who stuck to theirs. I dabbled in literature and philosophy and psychology and anthropology." He achieved a third-class award for Part I of the mathematics tripos in 1922.

While at Cambridge, Spratt joined the Union Society, the University Labour Club and a private discussion society called the Heretics, of which Charles Kay Ogden was president; Frank P. Ramsey, I. A. Richards and Patrick Blackett often attended. Philip Spratt, Maurice Dobb, John Desmond Bernal, Ivor Montagu, the historian Allen Hutt, A. L. Morton, A. L. Bacharach, Barnet Woolf, and Michael Roberts comprised the tiny handful of Communist Party members at the university at that time. Spratt, Woolf and Roberts would sell the Worker's Weekly to railwaymen at the town railway station or canvass the working-class areas of Cambridge. Spratt worked, for a while, at the Labour Research Department in the Deptford, and was a member of the London University Labour Party.

== Move to India and the India and China booklet trial ==
In 1926, at the age of 24, he was asked by Clemens Dutt (the elder brother of Rajani Palme Dutt) to journey to India as a Comintern agent to organise the working of the then nascent Communist Party of India, and in particular to launch a new Workers' and Peasants' Party (WPP) as a legal cover for their activities. He was expected to arrange for the infiltration of CPI members into the Congress party, trade unions and youth leagues to obtain leadership of them. Spratt was also asked to write a pamphlet on China, urging India to follow the example of the Kuomintang. He was accompanied to India by Ben Bradley and Lester Hutchinson.

The resulting pamphlet, India and China, was published under the synonym "An Internationalist" by S. S. Mirajkar on behalf of the WPP in May 1927. Shapurji Saklatvala, the Communist MP for Battersea North, wrote its introduction. It proved so effective that the British rulers banned it. Mirajkar's residence, WPP offices and even newspaper offices all over the country were searched. Spratt's room in the YMCA Hostel in Bombay was searched on 6 September 1927 and the manuscript seized. Spratt and Mirajkar were arrested at the office of the Marathi paper Kranti under Section 124-A. Spratt's arrest was on account of some cryptic letters written to and by him that had been seized by the Police, but he was eventually charged with sedition, on account of the India and China pamphlet.

Spratt was interned in the Arthur Road Prison for more than two months. M. A. Jinnah advised Sarojini Naidu to apply for transfer of the case to the High Court. The prosecution could not prevent him from being tried by jury, who declared him "not guilty". High Court Judge Justice Fawcett, having summed up very leniently, had to acquit Spratt. Hansard records show that on 28 November 1927, Shapurji Saklatvala, the MP for Battersea North, questions Earl Winterton (then Under-Secretary of State for India in Baldwin's government) about Spratt's wrongful detention for six weeks prior to his trial, even though not found guilty by the jury:

§ 32. Mr. SAKLATVALA asked the Under-Secretary of State for India if, in view of the fact that a Mr. Philip Spratt has recently been found not guilty by a jury in India of a charge of sedition in relation to the publication of a pamphlet entitled India and China, he will cause inquiries to be made as to the reason why he was in the first instance refused bail and thus kept in prison for six weeks prior to trial; and whether he will make representations for compensation to be paid to the said British national?

§ Earl WINTERTON It appears from the newspapers that bail was refused by Mr. Justice Davar in the High Court of Bombay, and it would not be proper to make inquiries as to the reasons for a decision which was within the competence of the Court. The answer to the second part of the question is in the negative.

§ Mr. SAKLATVALA Does the Noble Lord agree that this prosecution was launched by the Government and that the Judge of the High Court refused bail on certain representations which were made by the Government's prosecutor, which representations proved in the end to be untrue?

§ Earl WINTERTON The hon. Member is bringing a most serious charge against a Judge of the High Court, which I cannot accept for a moment. Judges of the High Court in India, as in this country, judge a question on its merits. Representations were doubtless made by prosecuting counsel, but the Judge is the sole interpreter as to whether they are correct, and I must respectfully decline to discuss on the Floor of the House the conduct of a Judge of the High Court.

§ Mr. SAKLATVALA Will the Noble Lord allow me to dispel his dramatic performance? Does the Noble Lord understand my question, which does not put any blame or comment or criticism on the Judge at all? My question is that the Judge, who gave a right decision upon the case presented to him by the Government prosecutor, afterwards, by his judgment, said it was a wrong presentation.

§ Earl WINTERTON I do not quite understand the hon. Member's question now. He has asked me whether I will cause inquiry to be made as to the reason why bail was refused. I have informed the hon. Member that I cannot do so because it would be committing a totally improper act, as criticising the action of the Judge. It rests solely with the Judge as to whether bail is granted or not.

§ Mr. SPEAKER Clearly, it is a matter for the Court of Justice.

== Activities in India, 1927–1929 ==
=== WPP and Young Workers' League ===
As soon as Spratt had arrived in India he got involved in organizing the WPP in Bombay, Calcutta and elsewhere. He later rose to their all India leaderships. Young Comrades' and later Young Workers' League were constituted, both by WPP and independently, as powerful mass organisations in 1927–1930. Spratt played an active part and described their growth and activities. He wrote that WPP took initiative to form the Leagues, which became widespread in the country. Spratt and others in the WPP disagreed with M. N. Roy's assessment that it should be a parallel organization to the Congress, as the latter was "practically dead". WPP by its program and constitution was working inside the Congress to strengthen the left and at the same time as an independent organization.

Spratt attended the Madras session of Congress in 1927. A Manifesto of WPP was presented to the session, which was prepared by Muzaffar Ahmed in consultation with Philip Spratt. It was published next year, in 1928, and formally adopted at the WPP conference in Calcutta, in December 1928. Spratt was included in its CEC. Significantly, it gave a call for constituting and holding elections to a Constituent Assembly based on adult franchise.

=== AITUC sessions ===
Spratt was an active participant in and organizer of the AITUC and workers' unions. The 7th session of AITUC was held on March 12–13, 1927 in Hindu College, Delhi. It was attended by prominent leaders like V. V. Giri, S. V. Ghate, Lala Lajpat Rai, S. S. Mirajkar, Nimbkar, Spratt and others. Spratt gave detailed account of it and played an active role.

The 8th session of the AITUC, held in Kanpur in November 1928, included S. A. Dange, V. V. Giri, N. M. Joshi, and Spratt, as also some others. Jones, Purcell, and Hallsworth attended on behalf of the British TUC. Rs 1000 was allotted for the defence of Spratt in the India and China booklet case. The session adopted 32 resolutions including one on the prosecution of Spratt. The left wing had become very strong by this time, and in fact S. A. Dange presented a separate report on the functioning of the left group in the AITUC. The session elected a Council of Action of which Spratt was a member.

A comprehensive review of the Indian TU movement written by Spratt was published in Labour Monthly of October 1927, giving details of organization, structure, membership union-wise and industry-wise, and movements industry-wise and section-wise.

Mirajkar, K. N. Joglekar, Mayekar, Spratt, and others conducted processions and strikes of Apollo, Manchester and other mills in Bombay. There were efforts to merge together Girni Kamgar Mahamandal and Bombay Textile Labor Union, which later resulted in GKU in 1928.

Spratt was included, along with Dange, N. M. Joshi, Diwan Chaman Lall, and others in the sub-committee formed to draft a labour Constitution of India, to be submitted to the Executive Council of India and to the labor movement. It led to a widespread discussion. He wrote detailed proposals and articles on it.

Spratt participated in the struggles of jute and other workers in Calcutta, Bombay and elsewhere during this time. In 1928, he was responsible for two sweeper's strikes in Calcutta.

== Meerut conspiracy trial ==
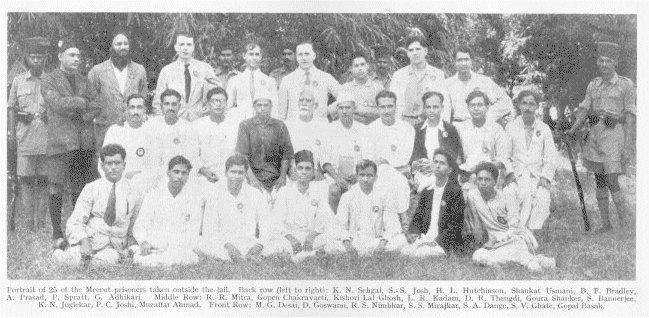
Portrait of 25 of the Meerut prisoners taken outside the jail. Back row (left to right): K. N. Sehgal, S. S. Josh, H. L. Hutchinson, Shaukat Usmani, B. F. Bradley, A. Prasad, P. Spratt, G. Adhikari. Middle row: R. R. Mitra, Gopen Chakravarti, Kishori Lal Ghosh, L. R. Kadam, D. R. Thengdi, Goura Shanker, S. Bannerjee, K. N. Joglekar, P. C. Joshi, Muzaffar Ahmad. Front row: M. G. Desai, D. Goswami, R. S. Nimbkar, S. S. Mirajkar, S. A. Dange, S. V. Ghate, Gopal Basak.

In March 1929, almost all the members of the Communist Party of India and about an equal number of trade unionists, congressmen and others who were working alongside them – 30 people in all – were arrested simultaneously in half a dozen different towns and taken to Meerut jail.

They were charged under Section 121A of the Indian Penal Code: conspiring to deprive the King Emperor of his sovereignty of British India. The body of conspirators was the Comintern and its associated organisations, and in particular the Indian party.

Spratt was sentenced to 12 years imprisonment, which on appeal, was reduced to 2; he was released from jail in October 1934. He discusses the psychology of imprisonment in an article which appeared in the Modern Review, Calcutta in 1937.

It is his time in Meerut that marked the beginning of his emotional turn away from communism:

When we had been in jail a year or two, the significance of the new Comintern line which we had accepted so uncomprehendingly at Calcutta began to show itself. It compelled the renovated party to split the central trade union body twice within two years, and to direct fierce criticism at the Congress, whose great Civil Disobedience campaigns made our activities look rather silly. We found fault with what was being done, but we did not direct our attack at the persons really responsible, viz. the Comintern authorities in Moscow… My own feelings were not of doubt or criticism but of boredom. I was closely involved in the preparation of the defence case, an immense and tedious job, and in the politics of the jail and the party outside. I gradually lost interest in all three, and became absorbed in reading and writing on other subjects… I have no doubt that here was the beginning of an emotional turn away from communism".

During his time in Meerut, Spratt learnt to read Hindi and one of the first books he read was Atmakatha by Mahatma Gandhi. On doing so, he resolved to write a study of Gandhi and while in Belgaum wrote his book on the Mahatma entitled Gandhism: An Analysis. While in confinement, Spratt also wrote the foreword for Peshawar to Moscow: Leaves from an Indian Muhajireen's Diary by Shaukat Usmani.

=== Debate in House of Commons ===
The Meerut Conspiracy Case was debated in the House of Commons of the British Parliament on several occasions. The position of Philip Spratt was specifically discussed on 7 March 1935. The Conservative MP Patrick Donner asked the Under-Secretary of State for the India Office, R. A. Butler, whether he was aware of the fact that Spratt was interned in Belgaum Fort under the Emergency Powers Act and whether he would be deported. Butler replied that Spratt was interned under Section 4 of the EPA within the confines of the Fort, and had been provided a suitable house. Spratt had firmly declined the offer of leaving India. Herbert Williams then asked: "If I take part in a conspiracy, will a house be provided for me after I have served my sentence?"

== Post-Meerut life in India ==
Upon his release from jail, Spratt went to Calcutta and Jhansi to address railway workers before reaching Bombay on 8 October 1934, accompanied by K. N. Joglekar, and was taken in a procession to the office of the Young Workers' League. He attended the open session of the All India Congress Socialist Conference in Bombay on 21 October and a meeting of the Press Workers' Union on 28 October, followed by a joint meeting of various trade unions on 31 October. He spent November in Wardha and Madras, liaising with Young Workers' League and CPI members. In December 1934, Spratt was arrested again under stringent emergency legislation passed to deal with civil disobedience struggle. He was interned in the Fort in Belgaum. He was released on 6 June 1936.

Spratt began to write strongly in criticism of Soviet policy after the Russian invasion of Finland in 1939. In 1943, he joined M. N. Roy's Radical Democratic Party, and remained a fairly active member until the party ceased to exist in 1948. In 1951, Spratt became secretary of the newly formed Indian Congress for Cultural Freedom, and a frequent contributor to its bulletin, Freedom First. He settled in Bangalore, and was the Chief Editor of a pro-American and pro-Capitalist weekly named MysIndia, until 1964. In its columns, he criticised the policies of the government which he believed, 'treated the entrepreneur as a criminal who has dared to use his brains independently of the state to create wealth and give employment'. He further believed that the result would be 'the smothering of free enterprise, a famine of consumer goods, and the tying down of millions of workers to soul deadening techniques'.

Spratt believed that the Kashmir Valley should be granted independence. In 1952, he stated that India must abandon its claim to the valley and allow the National Conference leader Sheikh Abdullah to 'dream of independence'. It should withdraw its armies and write off its loans to the state government. He stated:

"Let Kashmir go ahead, alone and adventurously, in her explorations of a secular state. We shall watch the act of faith with due sympathy but at a safe distance, our honour, our resources and our future free from the enervating entaglements which write a lie in our soul."

He argued that Indian policy was based on a 'mistaken belief in the one-nation theory and greed to own the beautiful and strategic valley of Srinagar'. He further stated that the costs of this policy, present and future, were incalculable, and that rather than give Kashmir special privileges and create resentment elsewhere in India, it was best to let the state secede.

Spratt later moved to Madras, and edited the Swarajya, which was a newspaper run by C. Rajagopalachari, and a mouthpiece of the Swatantra Party. During these years he also wrote several books on diverse subjects, numerous pamphlets and also translated books from French, German, Tamil, Sanskrit and Hindi, into English.

He wrote an autobiographical account, Blowing up India: Reminiscences and Reflections of a Former Comintern Emissary in 1955.

== Personal life ==
Soon after his release from jail in 1934, Spratt became engaged to Seetha, the grand-niece of Malayapuram Singaravelu Chettiar, who was a barrister and a founding member of the Communist Party in the south of India. Philip and Seetha married in 1939, and had four children: Herbert Mohan Spratt, Arjun Spratt, Radha Norah Spratt and Robert Spratt.

He died of cancer on 8 March 1971, in Madras.
