= Marxist League =

Marxist League may refer to:

- Marxist League (India), a political grouping in Bombay, India
- Marxist League of Kerala, an alliance of leftwing elements in Kerala, India during the 1960s
- Communist League (UK, 1932), later reorganised as the "Marxist League"

== See also ==
- Marxist-Leninist League (disambiguation)
