= Visakha Steel Workers Union =

Trade union in India

VSWU
- Visakha Steel Workers' Union
- Location: India
- Key people: D. Adinarayana (General Secretary)
- Affiliations: All India Trade Union Congress

Visakha Steel Workers Union, a trade union of steel workers at Visakhapatnam Steel Plant, in Visakhapatnam, India. VSWU is affiliated with the All India Trade Union Congress.

In March 2008 VSWU, contesting union elections in coalition with the CITU-affiliated Steel Plant Employees Union, regained the union recognition at the plant. The AITUC-CITU front won 6,597 votes against 4,361 votes for the INTUC-affiliated Visakha Steel Employees' Congress.

The general secretary of VSWU is D. Adinarayana.
