= J. P. Bagerhatta =

Indian Politician and one of the founding member of Communist Party of India

J. P. Bagerhatta was a freedom fighter and first General Secretary of the Communist Party of India with S. V. Ghate. S.V.Ghate became the sole general secretary and Bagerhatta left.
