= Benjamin Francis Bradley =

British communist

Ben Bradley
- Photograph of Benjamin Francis Bradley, also known as Ben Bradley, taken in 1943
- Born: Benjamin Francis Bradley; January 1898; London, England
- Died: 1957
- Organization(s): Amalgamated Engineering Union. All India Trade Union Congress. Member of the presidium of the Communist International. League Against Imperialism. Britain-China Friendship Association
- Known for: Support for Indian independence. Convicted in the Meerut Conspiracy Trial. Communist and anti-imperialist beliefs.
- Notable work: India: What we must do (1942)
- Political party: Communist Party of Great Britain (CPGB). Workers and Peasants Party.
- Criminal charges: Conspiracy to overthrow British colonialism in India (found guilty in a juryless trial)
- Criminal penalty: 10 year prison sentence (released early)
- Spouse: Joy (wife)
- Children: Josephine (daughter, born 1944)

Benjamin Francis Bradley (1898–1957) was a leading British communist and trade unionist who was accused of attempting to overthrow the British colonial rule in India, leading to him being sentenced in the Meerut Conspiracy Trial in 1933. His imprisonment in that case in 1929 provoked an enormous outcry, and in Britain, according to Stephen Howe, "probably inspired more left-wing pamphlet literature than any other colonial issue between the wars". He was also a key member of the Communist Party of Great Britain (CPGB).

== Life ==
=== Early life ===
Benjamin Francis Bradley, later known as "Ben Bradley", was born in Walthamstow, London, in January 1898. His father was a "time-keeper" at a motorworks and a night-watchman at a warehouse. Bradley's parents had 8 children, two of which died in infancy. In 1914 at the age of 16, Bradley left school to work as an engineer's apprentice. After briefly serving with the British Navy during World War I between 1916 and 1918, he returned to working in Britain as an engineer until 1921. He was a member of the Amalgamated Engineering Union from its foundation in 1920. Bradley was also active within the National Unimployed Workers Movement led by Wal Hannington, and the Metalworkers Minority Movement.

=== Political activities ===
In 1921, Bradley signed up to work as an engineer in India under a two-year contract. During his time in India he worked in the Rawalpindi area where he worked supervising a large workshop. He was troubled by the terrible working conditions and low pay that the workers received. Once he returned to Britain in early 1923, he joined the Communist Party of Great Britain (CPGB), and became a trade union activist and a shop steward in an engineering works. He once led a successful labour strike shortly before the 1926 United Kingdom general strike. As a part of joint efforts by the CPGB and the Soviet Union to train Indian communist leaders belonging to the Workers and Peasants Party, Bradley returned to India in Autumn of 1927, travelling with fellow CPGB activist Philip Spratt to Bombay (now Mumbai). Soon afterwards, Bradley became an Executive Committee member of both the All India Trade Union Congress, the Workers and Peasants Party, and the Vice-President of a newly formed mill-workers' union (Girni Kamgar Union) which reached a membership of 50,000 by the end of 1928. He also held additional roles in trade unions dedicated to railway workers.

==== Meerut Conspiracy Case ====
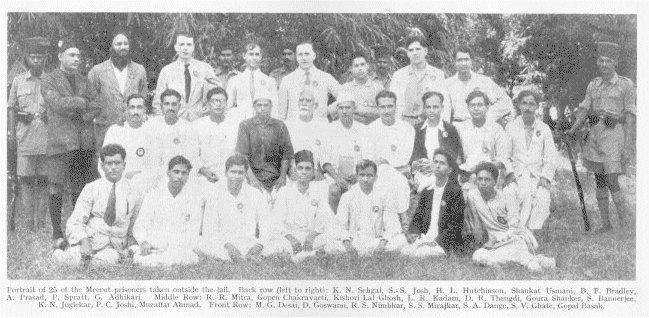
Portrait of 25 of the Meerut prisoners taken outside the jail. Back row (left to right): K. N. Sehgal, S. S. Josh, H. L. Hutchinson, Shaukat Usmani, B. F. Bradley, A. Prasad, P. Spratt, G. Adhikari. Middle row: R. R. Mitra, Gopen Chakravarti, Kishori Lal Ghosh, L. R. Kadam, D. R. Thengdi, Goura Shanker, S. Bannerjee, K. N. Joglekar, P. C. Joshi, Muzaffar Ahmad. Front row: M. G. Desai, D. Goswami, R. S. Nimbkar, S. S. Mirajkar, S. A. Dange, S. V. Ghate, Gopal Basak.

In March 1929, both Bradley and Spratt were arrested as a part of attacks by the British colonial occupation against trade unionism, communism, and the Indian independence movement. Bradley, Spratt, and many other communists and trade union leaders were charged under section 121A of the Indian Penal Code with "conspiracy to deprive the King-Emperor of the Sovereignty of British India". This trial, which began at the end of January 1930, became known as the Meerut Conspiracy Case. Bradley and his fellow accused were represented by the future Prime Minister of India, Jawaharlal Nehru. The trial, which had no jury, ended in August 1932 and was followed by 5 months of "judicial deliberations". Bradley was found guilty and sentenced to 10 years in prison, but was released in November 1933 and returned to the UK 2 months later.

During his imprisonment, campaigns were started demanding the release of Bradley and his fellow prisoners. In April 1929, communist led protesters held a demonstration at the Marble Arch to Victoria Station in London, which the British police responded to by forcefully removing all ethnic Indians from the area. The police would commit multiple violent attacks against peaceful Indian demonstrators in England who campaigned for the Meerut prisoners. These campaigns were highly successful in publicising the plight of Indian republicans and raising public opposition to the sentencing Bradley and his fellow prisoners.

== Return to Britain ==
Upon his return to Britain, Bradley was greeted at Victoria station by Shapurji Saklatvala, a leading British communist and the first ethnically Indian person to serve as an MP of the Labour Party. Saklatvala had been key to fighting for the release of the Meerut Conspiracy prisoners, and established the Meerut Prisoners' Defence Fund. Bradley then teamed up with Reginald Bridgeman in London to help run the British section of the League Against Imperialism. Bradley eventually became the secretary of the British section, a position he held until the organisation was dissolved in 1937, after which he returned to working as an engineer.

In 1940, Bradley was again arrested and jailed for 3 months for supporting Indian independence, after he made a speech at an Empire Day event calling for the independence of India. During the Second World War, he helped to produce a regular newsletter "Colonial Information Bulletin" called 'Inside the Empire'. During the early 1940s when the Communist Party of Great Britain (CPGB) was experiencing a large increase in membership, Bradley played a central role in the day to day running of the party, working closely alongside fellow communist leaders including Palme Dutt, Dave Springhall, and Bill Rust.

In 1942, Bradley published India: What we must do, an informational leaflet published by the CPGB dedicated to supporting Indian independence.

In 1944, Bradley's wife Joy gave birth to a daughter named Josephine. Shortly into their marriage, Joy became terminally ill and died.

After the war, Bradley became the circulation manager for the CPGB's newspaper the Daily Worker in 1946, and then became the National Organiser of the Britain-China Friendship Association.

== Death and legacy ==
Benjamin Francis Bradley died on 1 January 1957. His funeral was attended by over 300 people, including official representatives from the governments of China and India.

Bradley's papers are considered by historians to be an indispensable source for the study of the Meerut Conspiracy Trial, including an extensive prison correspondence, documents from the trial, and records of the international campaigns of solidarity with the defendants. They also contain his notes for a projected autobiography and materials relating to his later political activities.

Archival sources concerning Bradley's life can be found at both the People's History Museum in Manchester, and the British Library in London.

== Works ==
- The Background in India (1934)
- Anti-Imperialist People's Front in India (1936)
- On the Eve of the Indian National Congress (1938)
- India: What we must do (1942)
- India's famine: The facts (1943)

== See also ==
- R. Palme Dutt
- Harry Pollitt
- Meerut Conspiracy Case
- Udham Singh
- Claudia Jones
- Shapurji Saklatvala
