= Gangadhar Adhikari =

Indian Marxist theoretician (1898–1981)

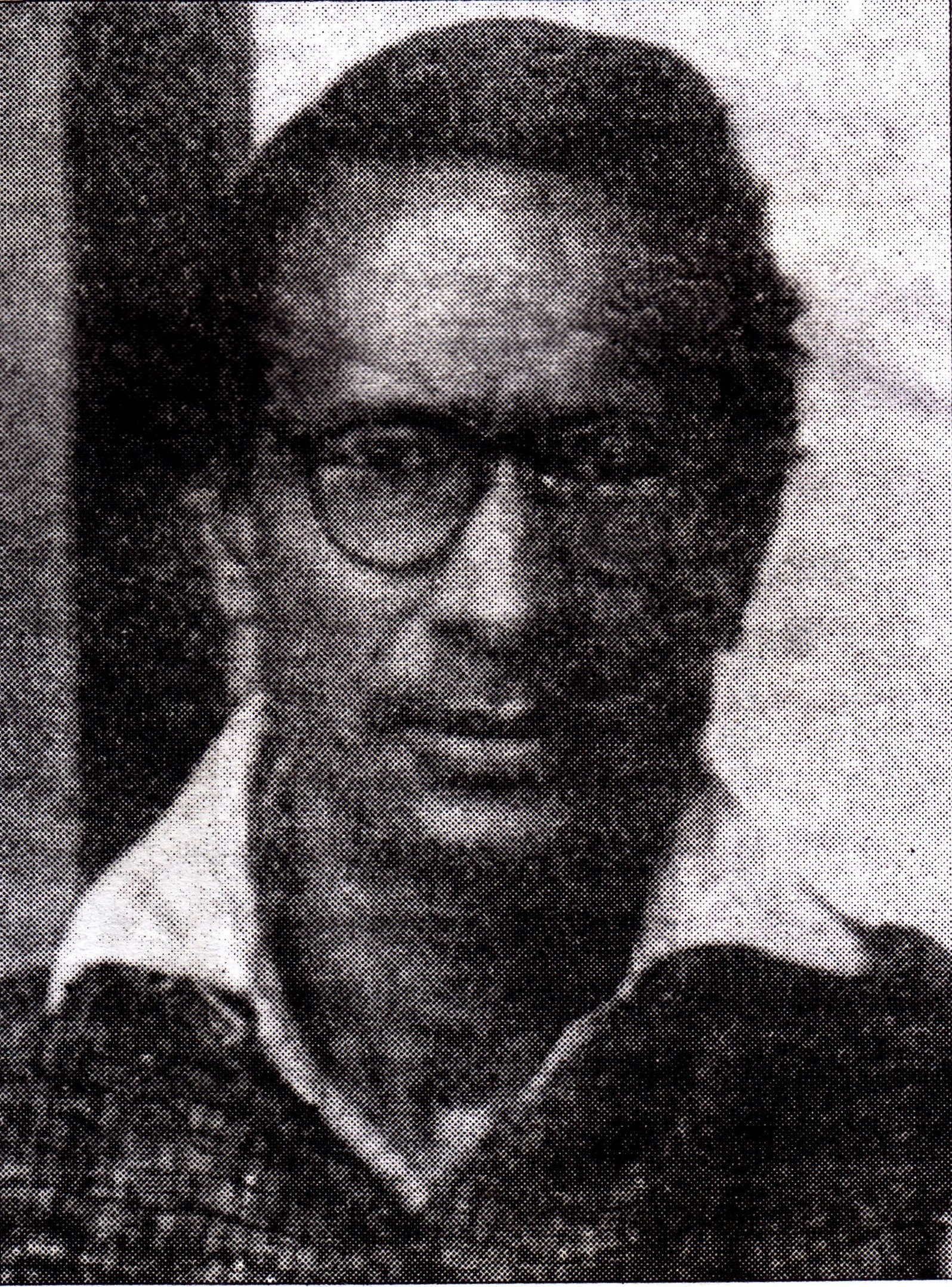

General Secretary of the Communist Party of India
- In office 1933–1935
- Preceded by: S.V. Ghate
- Succeeded by: P.C. Joshi

Personal details
- Born: 8 December 1898 Panvel, Colaba District, Bombay Presidency, British India
- Died: 21 November 1981 (aged 82)
- Party: Communist Party of India
- Spouse: Vimal Samarth
- Occupation: Theoretician

Gangadhar Adhikari (8 December 1898 – 21 November 1981) was a Marxist theoretician and prolific writer from India. He was the former general secretary of the Communist Party of India (CPI), one of the oldest political parties in India. He was a chemical scientist who earned his Ph.D. degree in Berlin in 1927.

== Biography ==
=== Early life ===
Gangadhar Moreshwar Adhikari was born on 8 December 1898 in Panvel, Colaba district, near Mumbai in a Chandraseniya Kayastha Prabhu family. His grandfather was a small landlord in Ratnagiri, but losing property, became a clerk in district collector's office. Adhikari's father shifted to Bombay, living in a chawl.

In this typical urbanized Maharashtrian family, Gangadhar passed his formative years. His early schooling was in Education Society's High School at Dadar, and matriculation from Wilson College in 1916. He was 8th in the whole Presidency, getting a scholarship.

=== In touch with politics ===
Gangadhar attended his first political meeting in 1918, addressed by Tilak. He also listened to speeches at Marathi Literary Society established by S. A. Dange and others in the college. Adhikari was deeply impressed by Khudiram Bose and Dr. R. G. Bhandarkar, and had great regard for scientist J. C. Bose. He passed his Intermediate science exams in 1918 topping in the entire state. He graduated in 1920. He was awarded scholarship at every stage of education.

Gangadhar Adhikari joined IISc (Indian Institute of Science), Bangalore as a research scholar. Impressed by the achievements of Germany, he learnt German. He wrote an MSc dissertation on extraction of salts from barium sulphate, attaining his MSc without having to appear for a viva. He was one of the rare students who was awarded a master's degree in absentia.

=== In Germany ===
Preferring Germany to England for monetary reasons, he set sail for Germany in July 1922 from Colombo, joining Frederick Wilhelm University (Humboldt University) in Berlin. He joined Technische Hochschule in Charlottenburg to study physical chemistry. Scientific attainments and knowledge of German language enabled him to complete doctorate in three instead of six years.

Prof Vollmar helped Adhikari in every way, their friendship lasting lifetime. Adhikari later met him again in GDR in 1964. After PhD Gangadhar became Dr Adhikari, later known as ‘Doc’. Adhikari met many world famous scientists and also collaborated with scientists like Leo Szilard and Eugene Wigner. The latter two later worked in the Manhattan atom bomb project in USA.

Lack of money forced him to live on one meal only. So his professor found him work of measuring expansion coefficient of ceramics and then as research assistant. He even worked as chemist in a factory in 1927.

It was during his work at University laboratory that Einstein came to see him, as he wanted to ‘have a look’ at the young Indian scientist.

Among those whom Adhikari tutored was Dr. Hussain Zaheer, the future Director General of CSIR.

=== Political contacts ===
While in Berlin, Adhikari met Virendranath Chattopadhyaya, a revolutionary and Communist, who founded Indian Association, whose meetings Dr. Adhikari attended. Adhikari met Zakir Hussain, Abid Hussain, M. Mujeeb and others, who later founded Jamia Millia Islamia.

Adhikari attended political lectures of Max Beer and others at India House, read John Reed, RPD, etc. RPD's India Today finally "converted" him! He regularly visited bookshop in central office of Communist Party of Germany for Marxist literature.

Adhikari soon became president of Indian Association. Motilal Nehru, Muhammad Ali, S. Srinivasa Iyengar, and others visited as CPG leaders as well. Adhikari delivered his first speech in German on Jallianwalan Bagh anniversary.

He was deeply moved by the film Battleship Potemkin. He met Jaisurya Naidu, Suhasini Chattopadhyaya (sister of Virendranath), Sarojini Naidu and others. Agnes Smedley, a friend of India and China, was ever present.

=== Joining Communist Party of Germany ===
Soon Adhikari joined Communist Party of Germany in 1928. Virendranath brought him in contact with CPG. It had its headquarters in Karl Liebknecht's house. His membership application was signed by Virendranath and Willi Münzenberg, leader of youth section of CPG and general secretary of League Against Imperialism. Adhikari also met M. N. Roy and Clemens Dutt, elder brother of RPD in the League.

He wrote for Kranti (Marathi, Bombay) and translated Engels's Questions and Answers on Communism directly from German into Marathi. Adhikari also met Lester Hutchinson, later his comrade in Meerut Conspiracy Case. He regularly attended mass meetings of Ernst Thaelmann, general secretary of CPG, who became famous after contesting presidential elections, receiving 12.6 percent of votes.

Adhikari went to his factory every day with a copy of party paper Rote Fahne (Red Flag) and discussed with workers.

Adhikari approached Virendranath to help him go to Soviet Union. Though Virendranath could smuggle him in, he advised against as the British CID would harass him badly. So it was off.

=== Return to India ===
Adhikari felt isolated from events back home. Wanting to return, he met Meghnad Saha, Satyen Bose, and Sir C. V. Raman for future prospects. They promised help.

Adhikari returned to Bombay in December 1928, secretly carrying Theses of 6th Comintern congress on colonial question. Top CID officers searched his belongings from morning till afternoon at the port but only got hold of Marxist literature. They were displayed as ‘evidence’ in Meerut Conspiracy Case in 1929.

=== At Communist Party of India meetings ===
Adhikari contacted C. J. Desai and M. G. Desai of Workers’ and Peasants’ Party (WPP). During WPP meeting in Calcutta in 1928 end, a secret meeting of CC of CPI was also held on 27–29 December 1928. It admitted Adhikari as CPI member and also included him in CC. He got to know prominent CPI leaders more closely.

In Bombay, he lived in a workers' chawl, doing his own cooking. He got a paltry sum of Rs 25 p.m. from his father towards expenses. He did Marxist education among workers. Later he shifted to Girni Kamgar Union (GKU) office.

=== In Meerut Conspiracy Case ===
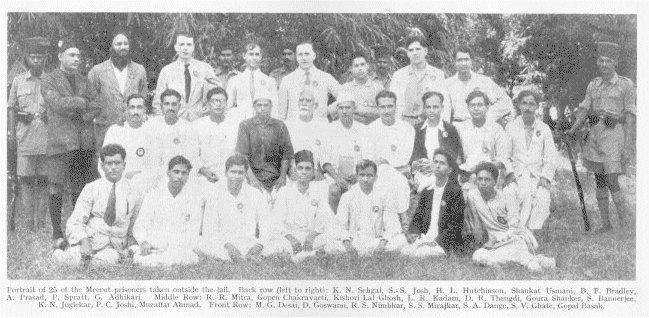
Portrait of 25 of the Meerut prisoners taken outside the jail. Back row (left to right): K. N. Sehgal, S. S. Josh, H. L. Hutchinson, Shaukat Usmani, B. F. Bradley, A. Prasad, P. Spratt, G. Adhikari. Middle row: R. R. Mitra, Gopen Chakravarti, Kishori Lal Ghosh, L. R. Kadam, D. R. Thengdi, Goura Shanker, S. Bannerjee, K. N. Joglekar, P. C. Joshi, Muzaffar Ahmad. Front row: M. G. Desai, D. Goswami, R. S. Nimbkar, S. S. Mirajkar, S. A. Dange, S. V. Ghate, Gopal Basak.

Adhikari was arrested on 20 March 1929 along with 31 others and lodged in Meerut Jail in most inhuman conditions. He was made secretary of the Jail Group and drafted many documents. Motilal Nehru and others came to meet him and other prisoners. He was released in March 1933.

=== General secretary of CPI ===
As the party outside was in a bad shape, Adhikari and some others organised a meeting of available comrades, forming a provisional CC with Adhikari as general secretary. He played a key role in the party's unification at the time.

He was very active in the widespread strike movement those days.

He was arrested in May 1934, sent to Byculla Jail and then Bijapur Jail. In February 1937, he made a dramatic escape from Bijapur helped by Ajoy Ghosh, reaching Calcutta. There he drafted a Manifesto of CPI, titled Gathering Storm, circulated in Faizpur session of Congress.

P. C. Joshi became acting general secretary. Back in Bombay, Adhikari became one of the architects of party organ ‘National Front’.

Adhikari lectured at Mantenavaripalam Summer School of Politics (AP), where C. Rajeswara Rao first met him.

Adhikari was elected to Bombay Provincial Congress Committee in 1939, defeating Shantabai Vengarkar. Dilshad Chari was Adhikari's polling agent and Bhulabhai Desai polling officer. He also became Politburo member of CPI along with P. C. Joshi, Bhardwaj, and Ajoy Ghosh. He went underground when Second World War broke out. One of his hideouts was the flat of D. G. Tendulkar, biographer of Gandhiji.

=== First party congress and later ===
Adhikari was elected to CC and PB at the First Congress of CPI held in 1943 in Bombay. In June 1943 Adhikari became editor of People's War and then of People's Age. His analyses of the battle fronts in World War II were widely read.

Adhikari was married to Vimal Samarth in 1943 in a simple wedding in the Commune, where they lived too. Their son Vijay died while swimming at Juhu Beach in 1963, affecting both of them deeply, particularly Vimal, who got mentally upset.

Adhikari was sent to Lahore in 1943 to sort out organizational problems. Patiently conducting a three-day GB of Punjab party members, he guided formation of new leadership. He also attended All India Bhakna Kisan Conference.

Being actively involved in Royal Indian Navy mutiny of February 1946, he persuaded RIN ratings not to blow up the ammunition dump at Castle Barracks, which would have endangered people's lives.

Adhikari attended a conference of CPs of British colonies in London in February–March 1947, representing CPI.

=== BTR period ===
Adhikari was elected to the CC and PB at 2nd congress of CPI in Calcutta in February 1948. B. T. Ranadive (GS), Bhowani Sen, and Somnath Lahiri were other members of PB. Adhikari supported BTR line, and as such was responsible for it. The party elected a new PB in 1950 and suspended BTR leadership including Adhikari. Adhikari made a remarkable self-critical analysis. He then went to Punjab to work as an ordinary member in 1951. He worked there in general elections of 1952. He also worked as an ordinary member in Parliamentary Office in Delhi and later in Bombay.

Dr Adhikari was elected to CC in Madurai (1953–54) and Palghat congresses (1956). He delivered Report on new Party Constitution at Amritsar (5th) congress. He was elected to NC and CEC and then again at Vijaywada (1961).

=== Split and later ===
He wrote extensively during ideological-political discussions in 1960s, including an important work Communist Party and India's Path to National Regeneration in 1964. He played important role in formulating new program and delivered the Report on Party Program at Bombay congress (1964). He was elected to Central Secretariat with specific responsibility of Party Education. At the Patna congress, he was elected to CEC, heading the Party Education and Studies Department. He was also entrusted with collecting, editing and writing Documents of History of CPI, of which several volumes were published. He meticulously collected materials from all over the world, building rich Archives. He continued this work till he almost lost his sight and till death. Later he withdrew from all party posts, devoting himself entirely to study and research.

He was Chairman of Central Control Commission in his last days.

Adhikari died at 83 years of age on 21 November 1981 due to heart attack. His wife Vimal had died at the beginning of the year.

== Bibliography ==
Adhikari's position on the national question, published in 1943 under the name Pakistan and Indian National Unity, was inspired by Joseph Stalin's Marxism and the National Question as it stressed the importance of a nationality to share a common language, a defined territory and a common national consciousness.

He compiled the ten volume Documents of the Communist Party of India.
