= Lester Hutchinson =

British politician (1904–1983)

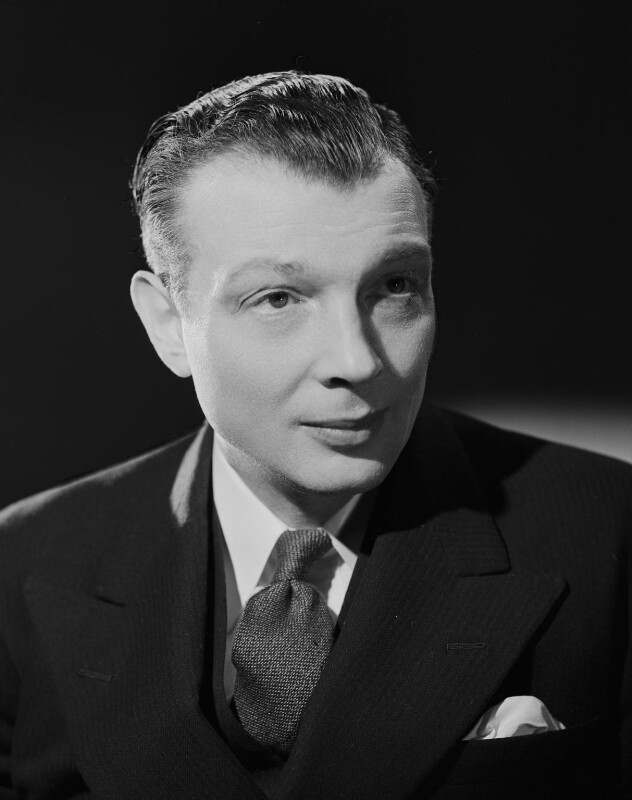
Lester Hutchinson in 1947

Hugh Lester Hutchinson (13 December 1904 – February 1983) was a Labour politician who was elected to represent Manchester Rusholme in the 1945 general election, winning the seat by ten votes.

== Early life and background ==
Hutchinson was born in Bury, Lancashire, the son of Richard Hutchinson, a backer of the Socialist Labour Party and his wife Mary Knight, who was a founding member of the Communist Party of Great Britain (CPGB). He was educated at Bootham School. He studied at the University of Neuchâtel, University of Genoa and University of Edinburgh, and then worked as a schoolteacher.

== In India ==
At Edinburgh, Hutchinson knew a young woman of the Chattopadhyay family. He went to Berlin, working as a journalist, and then travelled to India, meeting there the communist Ben Bradley. According to intelligence reports, he was a suspected communist from his arrival in India on 17 September 1928, having associated in Berlin with A. C. N. Nambiar, brother-in-law of Virendranath Chattopadhyaya. Philip Spratt considered that Hutchinson might have been in touch with M. N. Roy, and knew of contact with Virendranath Chattopadhyaya, and that he was not a member of the CPGB. He had an affair with Suhasini Chattopadhyay.

Hutchinson participated in the trade union movement in India in 1928–29, in the Girni Kamgar Union (GKU) of cotton mill workers, a breakaway group with Shripad Amrit Dange as general secretary. He was also a journalist on the Indian Daily Mail.

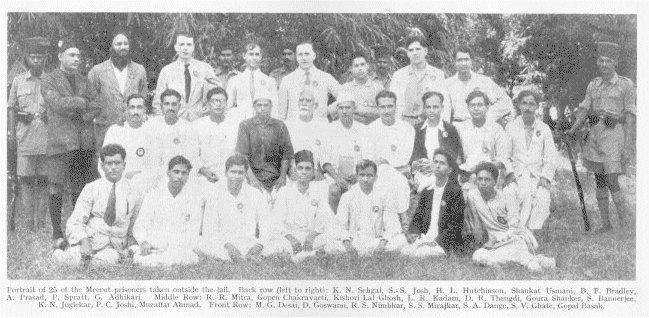
Portrait of 25 of the Meerut prisoners taken outside the jail. Back row (left to right): K. N. Sehgal, S. S. Josh, H. L. Hutchinson, Shaukat Usmani, B. F. Bradley, A. Prasad, P. Spratt, G. Adhikari. Middle row: R. R. Mitra, Gopen Chakravarti, Kishori Lal Ghosh, L. R. Kadam, D. R. Thengdi, Goura Shanker, S. Bannerjee, K. N. Joglekar, P. C. Joshi, Muzaffar Ahmad. Front row: M. G. Desai, D. Goswami, R. S. Nimbkar, S. S. Mirajkar, S. A. Dange, S. V. Ghate, Gopal Basak.

At the time of the 1929 Meerut Conspiracy Case, Hutchinson became involved with 32 others, communist and trade union leaders. His role in the GKU was as editor of the New Spark paper; but after the first arrests in the case in March 1929, he took on an official position, and was also brought in, some months later. He made a successful case for release on bail for Workers and Peasants Party Secretary General R. S. Nimbkar and himself. In September 1931 his mother met Mahatma Gandhi in London, and was told that the Meerut prisoners were not covered by the amnesty in the Gandhi–Irwin Pact of that year, because they were not non-violent. The trial came to an end in January 1933, and an appeal to the High Court of Judicature at Allahabad ended in August of that year with Hutchinson and eight other defendants being released.

== In politics, and later life ==
Returning to the United Kingdom, Hutchinson worked for the National Council of Labour Colleges. In 1935 he set up, with J. T. Murphy, the New School of Political Science to run correspondence courses. He seconded a motion by Alex Gossip on Palestine at the 1936 Labour Party Conference.

There was a by-election in 1944 in the Manchester Rusholme constituency, caused by the death of the Conservative Member of Parliament. Hutchinson was a reputed fellow traveller with communist connections, and the constituency party was strongly left-wing; but the war-time electoral pact meant that Hutchinson, who had gone public as keen to stand as an Independent Labour candidate, was put in his place. Instead, Labour party officials quietly arranged that a Common Wealth Party candidate, Harold Blomerley, should be given a clear run, with an undertaking that he would later step aside for a Labour candidate outside the current coalition.

The Scottish journalist Bob Brown (1924–2009) campaigned for Hutchinson in Manchester Rusholme in the 1945 general election, as a soldier stationed in Manchester. He described Hutchinson as "very left-wing" and "a man after my own heart who believed in socialism in our time, as I did then". Hutchinson was elected for the seat, defeating the sitting Conservative Frederick Cundiff by 15,408 votes to 15,398. In 1946 he made a maiden speech in the House of Commons, including regretting "the traditional policy of bolstering up reactionary monarchs and decaying regimes wherever we can find them" and the impact it had had on diplomatic relations with the USSR. In March 1946 he spoke at a public meeting on behalf of anti-Franco Spanish prisoners, from camps in France, being held in the UK, along with George Orwell, Fenner Brockway and Elizabeth Braddock.

Left-wing backbench opposition to the Attlee government concentrated on foreign policy, and in particular on the Atlanticism of Ernest Bevin, the foreign secretary. An overlapping concern were the "crypto-communists", commonly estimated at about a dozen, thought to be on the Labour benches. Matters came to a head in 1949, with expulsions of MPs from the Labour Party, and the formation of the Labour Independent Group, made up of those who took a particular interest in challenging Bevin with questions. At the beginning of that year, Hutchinson took part in the "peace tour" organised in the US by the Progressive Party, with Henry A. Wallace and Michele Guia. In February Labour's National Executive Committee told his presumptive constituency party (Manchester Ardwick) that there was a prospect he would not be endorsed in the future.

The North Atlantic Treaty was signed in April 1949. The Labour MPs Leslie Solley and Konni Zilliacus were expelled from the Labour Party in May. They joined D. N. Pritt, expelled 1940, and John Platts-Mills, expelled 1948, to set up the Labour Independent Group, which lasted to the 1950 election. Hutchinson was expelled in July, because he opposed the Treaty, and joined them.

The Rusholme constituency was abolished for the 1950 election. Hutchinson unsuccessfully stood for the Walthamstow West seat, won by Clement Attlee, whom he criticised for acting cautiously after becoming prime minister in 1945. He never returned to Parliament.

In later life, Hutchinson was a teacher in Lichfield.

== Works ==
- Conspiracy at Meerut (1935), with a preface by Harold Laski comparing the trial to the Dreyfus case and the trial of Thomas Mooney, among others. A review by Frederick Greville Pratt, who had been in the Indian Civil Service, picked out as points:
  - abuses of procedure in the trial;
  - severe sentences reduced on appeal;
  - Laski's comments overstated;
  - Hutchinson's use of hearsay;
  - his account of jail discipline "unpleasant reading", but his own treatment was not bad.
- The Empire of the Nabobs: A Short History of British India (1937)
- The Rise of Capitalism (1941, NCLC Publication Society)
- European Freebooters in Mughal India (1964)
- The Conspiracy of Catiline (1967)

He also produced an edition (1969) of two pamphlets by Karl Marx, Secret Diplomatic History of the Eighteenth Century and The Story of the Life of Lord Palmerston.
