= Amarjeet Kaur =

General secretary of the All India Trade Union Congress

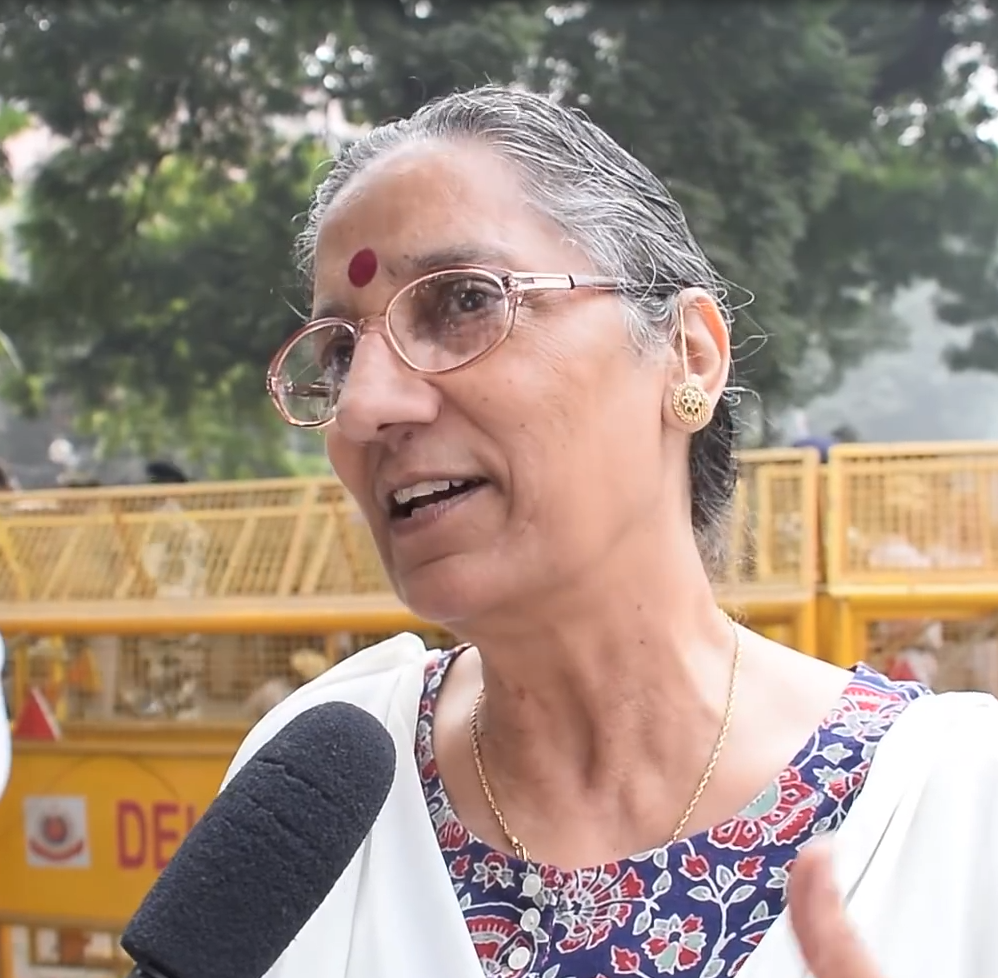

General Secretary of the All India Trade Union Congress
- Incumbent
- Assumed office 11 December 2017
- Preceded by: Gurudas Dasgupta

Personal details
- Born: 2 April 1952 (age 74) Punjab, India
- Party: Communist Party of India
- Education: MSc Physics, LLB
- Alma mater: University of Delhi
- Occupation: Trade unionist, Politician

Amarjeet Kaur (born 2 April 1952) is an Indian politician and National Secretary of the Communist party of India. She is General Secretary of the All India Trade Union Congress. She is the first woman in Independent India to be at the helm of one of the central trade unions, after Maniben Kara’s election as AITUC General Secretary in 1936.

Kaur went on to become the second woman general secretary of the All India Students Federation (AISF) for seven years from 1979 and General Secretary of National Federation of Indian Women (NFIW) from 1999 to 2002. She was AITUC National Secretary from 1994 to 2017. While a student, she was jailed in Delhi for 10 days in 1972 for participating in a CPI protest over price-rise, and for four days in 1977 for a joint Jamia-JNU-Delhi University students’ protest over Aligarh Muslim University riots.
