= All India Defence Employees Federation =

Trade union in India

AIDEF
- All India Defence Employees' Federation
- Founded: 1953
- Location: India
- Key people: S. N. Pathak (President), C. Srikumar (General Secretary)
- Affiliations: All India Trade Union Congress, Centre of Indian Trade Unions, Hind Mazdoor Sabha
- Website: AIDEF Homepage

All India Defence Employees Federation is a trade union in India that organizes civilian workers in factories and other establishments under the Ministry of Defence. AIDEF is supported jointly by the All India Trade Union Congress and the Centre of Indian Trade Unions. AIDEF was founded in 1953.

S.N. Pathak is the president C. Srikumar are General Secretary's of AIDEF.(From June'2013 to June 2016)

AIDEF opposes privatization of Defence units and ordnance factories.
