= Andhra Pradesh Mica Mine Workers Union =

Trade union in India

APMMU
- Andhra Pradesh Mica Mine Workers' Union
- Location: India
- Members: 1200
- Affiliations: All India Trade Union Congress

A.P. Mica Mine Workers Union, a trade union of mica mine labourers in the Gudur minefields in Andhra Pradesh, India. APMMU is affiliated to All India Trade Union Congress. APMMU claims a membership of 1200 out of a total of 7000 workers.

Andhra Pradesh is one of the three leading areas where mica is mined in India. India produces roughly 62% of the world's mica but in recent years other materials substituting mica in its main applications (such as electronics) have impacted the price and mining of mica in India.
