= Puran Chand Joshi =

Former General secretary of the Communist party of India

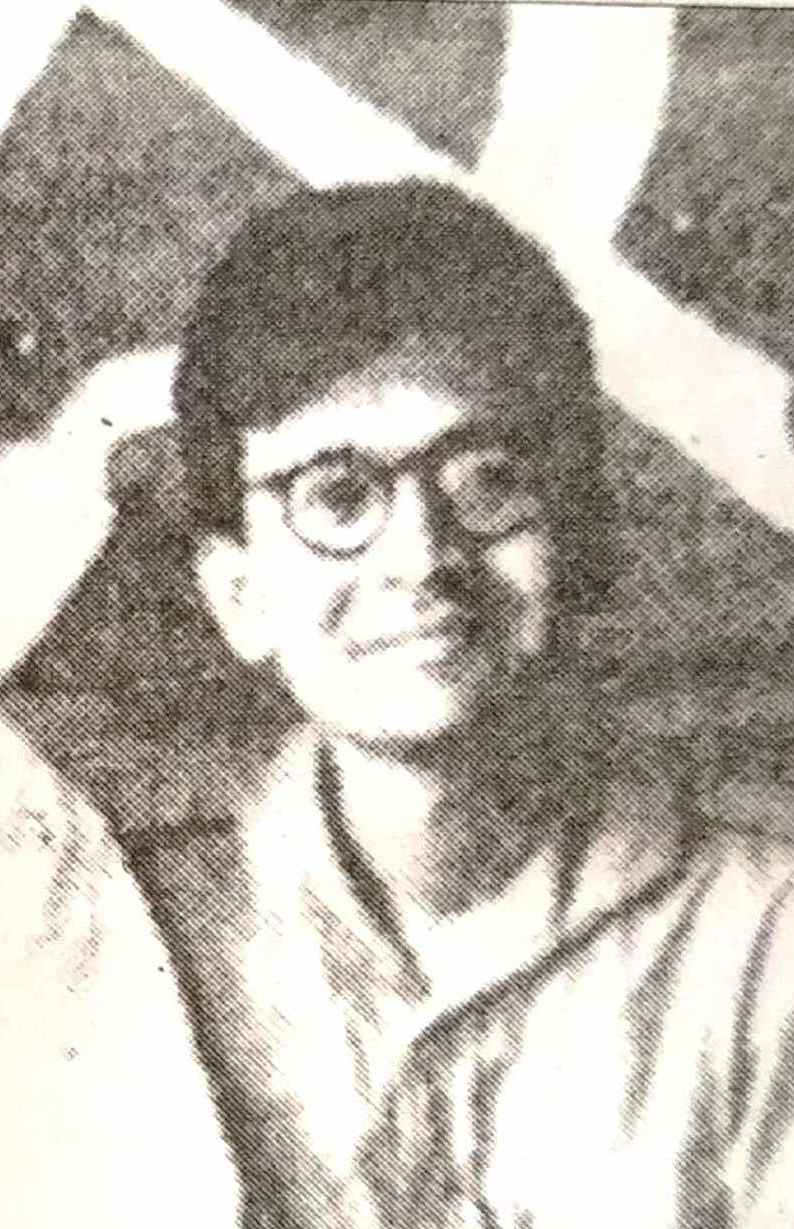
- Joshi in 1937

General Secretary of the Communist Party of India
- In office 1936–1947
- Preceded by: Gangadhar Adhikari
- Succeeded by: B. T. Ranadive

Personal details
- Born: 14 April 1907 Almora, Arga and Oudh, British India (now Uttarakhand, India)
- Died: 9 November 1980 (aged 73) Delhi, India
- Party: Communist Party of India
- Spouse: Kalpana Datta
- Education: Allahabad University
- Occupation: Freedom fighter, leader

Puran Chand Joshi (14 April 1907 – 9 November 1980) was one of the early leaders of the communist movement in India. He was the general secretary of the Communist Party of India from 1935 to 1947.

== Early years ==
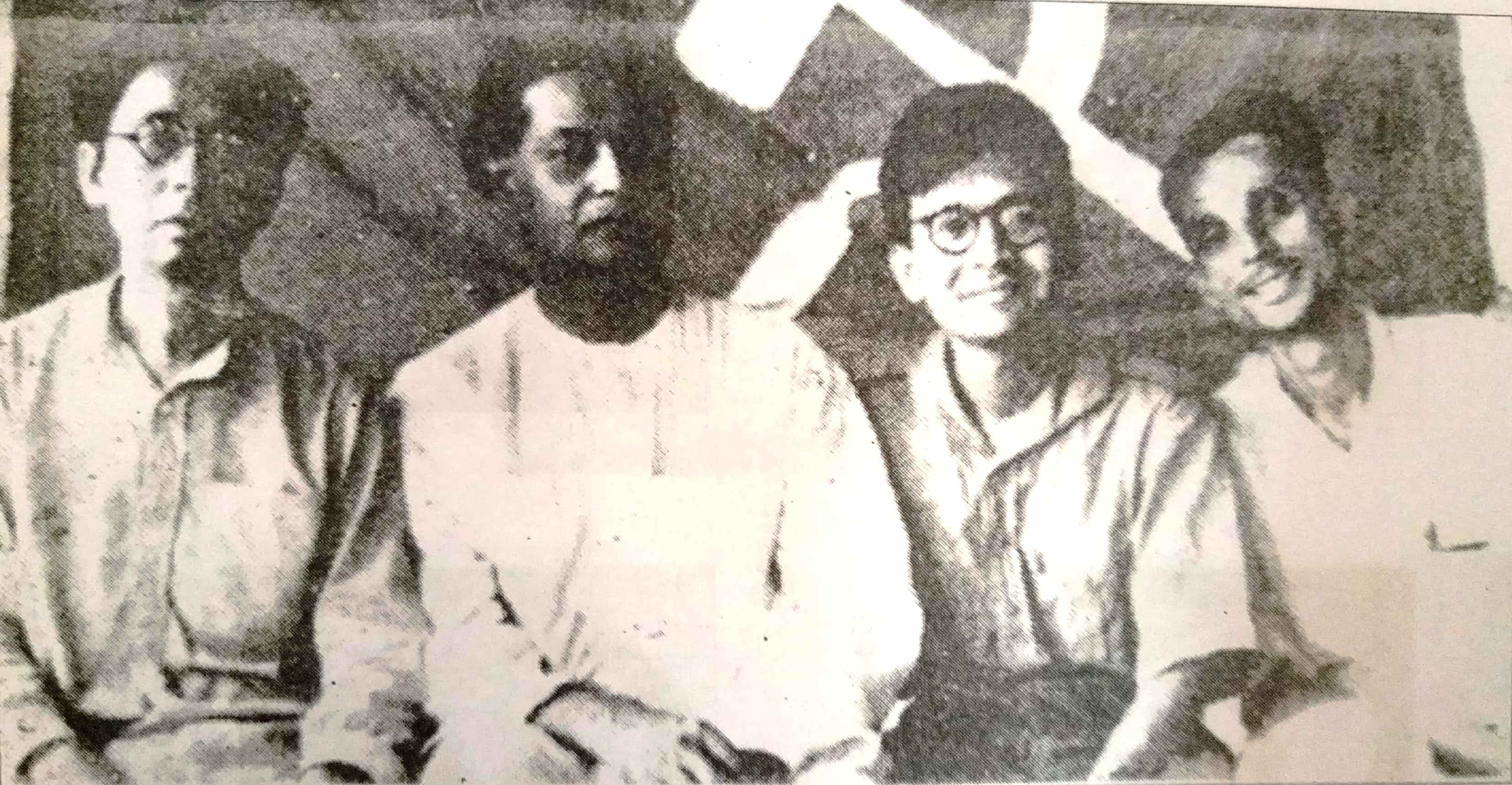
(From left to right) Muzaffar Ahmed, Bankim Mukherjee, P. C. Joshi, and Somnath Lahiri in Calcutta, 1937

Joshi was born on 14 April 1907, in a Kumaoni Hindu Brahmin family of Almora, in Uttarakhand. His father Harinandan Joshi was a teacher. In 1928, he passed his Master of Arts examination from the Allahabad University. He was arrested soon after completion of post-graduation. He became a leading organizer of the Youth Leagues during 1928–1929, along with Jawaharlal Nehru, Yusuf Meherally, and others. Soon, he became the General secretary of the Workers and Peasants Party of Uttar Pradesh, formed at Meerut in October 1928. In 1929, at the age of 22, the British Government arrested him as one of the suspects of the Meerut Conspiracy Case. The other early communist leaders who were arrested along with him included Shaukat Usmani, Muzaffar Ahmed, S. A. Dange, and S. V. Ghate.

Joshi was given six years of transportation to the penal settlement of Andaman Islands. Considering his age, the punishment was later reduced to three. After his release in 1933, Joshi worked towards bringing a number of groups under the banner of the Communist Party of India (CPI). In 1934 the CPI was admitted to the Third International or Comintern.

== As the General Secretary ==
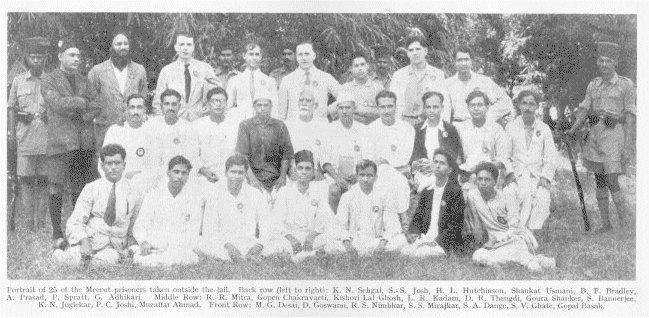
Portrait of 25 of the Meerut prisoners taken outside the jail. Back row (left to right): K. N. Sehgal, S. S. Josh, H. L. Hutchinson, Shaukat Usmani, B. F. Bradley, A. Prasad, P. Spratt, G. Adhikari. Middle row: R. R. Mitra, Gopen Chakravarti, Kishori Lal Ghosh, L. R. Kadam, D. R. Thengdi, Goura Shanker, S. Bannerjee, K. N. Joglekar, P. C. Joshi, Muzaffar Ahmad. Front row: M. G. Desai, D. Goswami, R. S. Nimbkar, S. S. Mirajkar, S. A. Dange, S. V. Ghate, Gopal Basak.

After the sudden arrest of Somnath Lahiri, then Secretary of CPI, during end-1935, Joshi became the new General Secretary. He thus became the first general secretary of Communist Party of India, for a period from 1935 to 1947. At that time the left movement was steadily growing and the British government banned communist activities from 1934 to 1938. In February 1938, when the Communist Party of India started in Bombay its first legal organ, the National Front, Joshi became its editor. The Raj re-banned the CPI in 1939, for its initial anti-War stance. When, in 1941, Nazi Germany attacked the Soviet Union, the CPI proclaimed that the nature of the war has changed to a people's war against fascism.

== Ideological-political hegemony and cultural renaissance ==
Historians have noted P.C Joshi's role in expanding the Communist Party of India's engagement with writers, intellectuals, students and cultural movements during his tenure as general secretary. His leadership period saw increased participation of cultural figures and mass organization associated with the communist movement P.C. Joshi article

Joshi, firstly, rendered political movement of his times revolutionary as none else. His slogan of "National Front" against imperialism, colonialism and fascism fully accorded with times and aspirations of educated masses. People were attracted in huge numbers to Communist Party even if they all did not join it. Students, youth, teachers, professionals, artists, enlightened bourgeoisie and many others accepted aspects of Marxism in their broadest meaning.

During his leadership, communists transformed the Congress into a broad front with strong left influence. Formation of CSP, WPP, Left Consolidation, and joint mass organizations radicalized vast sections of conscious people far beyond the confines of the CPI. Key policy making centers were operated by the communists, such as on industry and agriculture. Several PCCs were directly led or participated in by communists such as Sohan Singh Josh, S. A. Dange, S. V. Ghate, S. S. Mirajkar, Malayapuram Singaravelu, Z. A. Ahmed, etc. there were at least 20 Communists in the AICC, establishing a working relationship with Mahatma Gandhi, Nehru, Bose, and others. Influence of Marxism spread far beyond communist movement, and was broadly accepted as the most advanced ideology, though interpretations varied. In fact, Marxism became a "fashion". By the end of 1930s and early 1940s, huge number of people converted to Marxism, leaving a deep imprint on ideology of the national movement: Congress, CSP, HSRA, Ghadar, Chittagong group, etc. Marxism won ideological victories. Congress almost became a left organization after the election of Subhash Bose as Congress president, much of whose credit should go to Joshi. If Bose had not left Congress, perhaps we would have seen a different Congress at the time of freedom.

Secondly, art and culture were given a mass democratic and revolutionary form by Joshi. Songs, drama, poetry, literature, theater, and cinema became vehicle of mass consciousness and radicalization. The printed word became mass force. All this created a renaissance on the national scene. Their deep effects can be seen long after freedom. Communists were the first to use these media on such scale with telling impact.

Important figures filled the socio-cultural scene in literature, art, culture, and films, radicalizing generations. CPI, IPTA, PWA, AISF, etc. have inspired progressive movements. Many youths became communists reading Premchand's and Rahul's books and participating in mass culture. Communist Party exercised considerable ideological and cultural hegemony, even though it was relatively small. There is much contemporary lessons.

Culture became an effective means to politicize and awaken the masses. Joshi effortlessly combined political culture of the masses with national aspirations.

== First CPI congress, 1943 ==
The congress was as much a cultural event as it was political. Vast number of non-party people joined the proceedings and waited for results. Joshi's speech was eagerly awaited and heard with rapt attention.

== Multi-faceted struggles ==
Joshi was a man of masses and knew when to move and what slogans to give. His work in Bengal famine is unparalleled. IPTA was born of it. His analysis of roots of famine is profoundly scientific Marxist. His correspondence with Mahatma Gandhi convinced the "Father of the Nation" of many views of the communists.

It is often presented as if Joshi was a compromiser, a class collaborationist. This view is a legacy of the B. T. Ranadive period when he was much maligned.

Joshi not only led peaceful mass struggles and the party in various elections including those of 1946; he also led the party successfully in armed struggles. It was during his leadership that armed struggles like those of Kayyur, Punnapra-Vayalar, RIN revolt, Tebhaga, and Telangana took place. This is sought to be underplayed. It was he who gave the green signal for the Telangana armed struggle in 1946, as part of anti-Nizam struggle and not as part of socialist revolution in India. The two are different.

During his stewardship, several communists were sent to the legislatures, even though voting was highly restricted.

== Expulsion and rehabilitation ==
In the post-freedom period, the Communist Party of India, after the second congress in Calcutta (new spelling: Kolkata) adopted a path of taking up arms. Joshi was advocating unity with Indian National Congress under the leadership of Jawaharlal Nehru. He was severely criticized in the Calcutta congress of the CPI in 1948 and was removed from the general secretaryship. Subsequently, he was suspended from the Party on 27 January 1949, expelled in December 1949 and readmitted to the Party on 1 June 1951. Gradually he was sidelined, though rehabilitated through making him the editor of the Party weekly, New Age. After the Communist Party of India split, he was with the CPI. Though he explained the policy of the CPI in the 7th congress in 1964, he was never brought in the leadership directly.

== Last days ==
In his last days, he kept himself busy in research and publication works in Jawaharlal Nehru University to establish an archive on the Indian communist movement.

== Personal life ==
In 1943, he married Kalpana Datta (1913–1995), a revolutionary, who participated in the Chittagong armoury raid. They had two sons, Chand and Suraj. Chand Joshi (1946-2000) was a noted journalist, who worked for the Hindustan Times. He was also known for his work, Bhindranwale: Myth and Reality (1985). Chand's second wife Manini (née Chatterjee, b 1961) is also a journalist, who works for The Telegraph. Manini Chatterjee penned a book on the Chittagong armoury raid, titled, Do and Die: The Chittagong Uprising 1930-34 (1999).

== See also ==
- Kumaon division
- Kumaoni people
