= Andhra Pradesh Auto Rickshaw Drivers and Workers Federation =

Trade union in India

Andhra Pradesh Auto Rickshaw Drivers and Workers Federation or Andhra Pradesh Auto Drivers and Workers' Federation is a trade union of auto rickshaw drivers in Andhra Pradesh, India.

APARDWF is affiliated to the All India Trade Union Congress.
