= S. V. Ghate =

First General Secretary of the Communist Party of India (1896–1970)

Sachchidanand Vishnu Ghate

General Secretary of the Communist Party of India
- In office 1925–1933
- Preceded by: Position Created
- Succeeded by: Gangadhar Adhikari

Personal details
- Born: 14 December 1896 Mangalore, Madras Presidency, British India
- Died: 28 November 1970 (aged 73) New Delhi, India
- Party: Communist Party of India
- Occupation: Politician

Sachchidanand Vishnu Ghate (14 December 1896 – 28 November 1970), also known as S.V. Ghate, was a freedom fighter émigré and first General Secretary of the Communist Party of India (CPI). The Communist Party of India's Karnataka State headquarters, Ghate Bhavan, is named in his honor.

== Biography ==
=== Early life ===
S. V. Ghate was raised in Mangalore in a Maharashtrian Karhade Brahmin family in Mangalore. With the assistance of his older brother, he attended St Aloysius College in Mangalore. He is quoted as saying that his reading of "Indian philosophy, including Ramakrishna Paramahamsa, and Vivekananda" were influential in his becoming a Communist, stating, "The main thing in all the topics in philosophy is service of people."

=== General Secretary of the Communist Party of India ===
In December 1925 the first Communist Conference of India was held at Kanpur, where under the leadership of Satya Bhakta an amalgamation of many small left-wing parties allowed for the founding of an all-India organisation under the name of the "Communist Party of India".

During the first Communist Conference in India held at Kanpur in December 1925, there was a debate among the leaders on the appropriate name for the party. While Satya Bhakta opined that the party was to be named "Indian Communist Party", other leaders such as S. V. Ghate, K. N. Joglekar, R. S. Nimbkar stressed that the general international norm was that it was called the Communist Party of this country or that country, hence, insisted that the party should be called the "Communist Party of India". As a result of this, Satya Bhakta formed a separate party and called it the "National Communist Party" and the party was officially announced as the "Communist Party of India". Finally, on 26 December 1925, the Communist Party of India (CPI) was formed and Ghate was chosen as the first General Secretary.

In 1927, Ghate became the first Communist to be elected as an All India Trade Union Congress (AITUC) office bearer during the Kanpur session. Ghate's accession to AITUC signalled a shift in the organisation's philosophy. Gradually, the Communist faction gained further influence over the organisation and were successful in reorienting it toward their ideology.

When the CPI purchased an old military jeep from the Indian Army, Ghate would pick up party staff and leaders and transport them to its Central Office. His fellow party members, including Chandra Rajeswara Rao, dubbed this jeep the GTS, or Ghate Transportation Service.

=== Workers' and Peasants' Party (WPP) ===
Ghate and colleagues transformed the Socialist Group within the Congress into a WPP in 1927, with S. S. Mirajkar as the general secretary, and soon spread to other provinces. Ghate also initiated Young Workers’ League. He played a crucial role in the Boycott Simon Commission movement of 1927–28. It was an upsurge in Bombay, and the commission had to bypass Bombay on way to Poona. Seven effigies were burnt for seven members of the commission. More than 50 thousand people came out in a historic procession led by the WPP. Ghate and Mirajkar met Shapurji Saklatvala when he came to Bombay in January 1927, and organized a huge public reception in his honor. Ghate was in-charge of one of the centers of Girni Kamgar Union (GKU) during the historic textile strike of 1928. He along with Dange, Joglekar, N. M. Joshi, and others was a member of the Central Strike Committee. The all India conference of WPP was held in Albert Hall, Calcutta in December, 1928. Ghate played a central role. WPP also brought out a massive demonstration before the Congress pandal, demanding acceptance of resolution on full independence. The CPI also held its meetings under his guidance.

=== Meerut Conspiracy Case ===
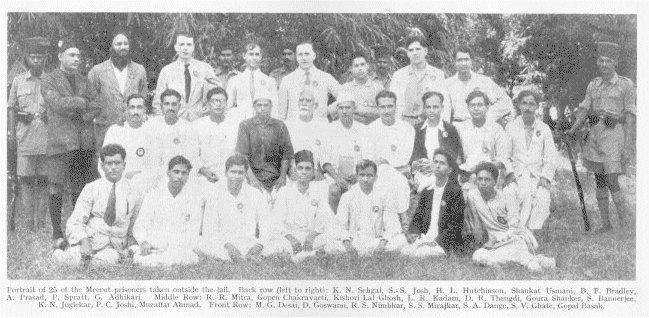
Portrait of 25 of the Meerut prisoners taken outside the jail. Back row (left to right): K. N. Sehgal, S. S. Josh, H. L. Hutchinson, Shaukat Usmani, B. F. Bradley, A. Prasad, P. Spratt, G. Adhikari. Middle row: R. R. Mitra, Gopen Chakravarti, Kishori Lal Ghosh, L. R. Kadam, D. R. Thengdi, Goura Shanker, S. Bannerjee, K. N. Joglekar, P. C. Joshi, Muzaffar Ahmad. Front row: M. G. Desai, D. Goswami, R. S. Nimbkar, S. S. Mirajkar, S. A. Dange, S. V. Ghate, Gopal Basak.

In 1929, he was jailed in the Meerut Conspiracy Case.

While in jail, Ghate was the leader of the Camp No. II prisoners, which included about 200 prisoners, mostly Sikhs, and about 160 Communists and 30 socialists. When Ghate was jailed, Gangadhar Adhikari became the General Secretary of CPI. Next, when Adhikari was jailed, the CPI was forced underground. After going underground for several years, it successfully reorganised and PC Joshi took the reins in 1935 as General Secretary.

=== Later political activities ===
While working in Mangalore in 1934, workers from Kannur were influenced by Ghate and Kamaladevi Chattopadhyay, the two prominent Mangalorean socialists, to form the Kannur Beedi Thozhilali Union (KBTU).

In 1935, the CPI adopted a Popular Front strategy to ally themselves with other anti-colonial agitators. In 1936, Ghate sought to develop the Communist Party in the Madras Presidency. When he reached Madras in 1936, he met with and sought to unite political leaders, including Malayapuram Singaravelu, V. Subbiah, P. Jeevanandham, K. Murugesan Anandan, B. Srinivasa Rao, and Puchalapalli Sundarayya. At that time, Ghate came to an agreement with Puran Chand Joshi and Jayaprakash Narayan that the CPI and Congress Socialist Party workers should join forces, and personally promised Narain to work to bring up CSP. At that time, became the editor of New Age.

Later on, in 1937, Ghate went to Kerala, where he participated in the formation of the state's first Communist cell. Ghate, the national Communist leader, provided the requisite support for state activists E. M. S. Namboodiripad, P. Krishna Pillai, K. Damodaran, N. C. Sekhar to form the first Communist cell in the state.

Hindu Communists S. V. Ghate (standing L) and M. N. Govindan Nair (standing C), at the meeting of Indian Communists.

In March 1939, he was ordered to leave Madras and reside within Mangalore city limits. Despite complying with the order, in 1944 he was arrested and detained. Upon his arrest, he was transported to Deoli Detention jail where he was held with other prominent Communists who had interfered with the British. S.S. Mirajkar is quoted as saying, "When Ghate was taken away, Gangadhar Adhikari became secretary. When Adhikari was taken away, I was made secretary and I continued for some time till I disappeared from the scene."

== The Three Ps Document ==
The CPI underwent a period of turmoil and dysfunction during which time leaders were put in jail and the organisation was forced to operate underground. During this tumultuous period, Ghate and his fellow leaders sought to unify the party. Writing under pseudonyms, Ghate, Shripad Amrit Dange, and Ajoy Ghosh – Purushottam, Prabodh Candra, and Prakash, respectively – released the "Three Ps Document" on 30 September 1950. The document sought to unify a party that had been brought to the brink of annihilation. It was written in opposition to both B. T. Ranadive's Ranadive Line, which sought to emulate the Russian Zhdanov Doctrine, and the Andhra Thesis, which advocated emulating the Chinese Communist Party's path.

As the Three Ps Document put it, "The old leadership talked about the 'Russian way', the new leadership talks about [the] 'Chinese way'. The older leadership talked about 'revolutionary upsurge', the new leadership talks about 'civil war' ... Neither bothered to understand and analyse the situation in our own country." Instead, the Three Ps Document proposed an Indian path that took into account the local conditions and circumstances of India.

== Political views ==
CPI leaders, including Ghate and Dange, whose base was with the working class and trade unions advocated for an end to the violent Telangana Rebellion and for participation in general elections.

== Personal life ==
Incidentally, S.V. Ghate is the uncle of the founder-president and former General Secretary of Bharatiya Mazdoor Sangh, Prabhakar Ghate and grand-uncle of Karnataka-state Bharatiya Janata Yuva Morcha General Secretary and Magnum Intergrafiks founder and managing director, Sudhir Ghate.
