= Pondicherry Textile Labour Union =

Trade union in India

The Pondicherry Textile Labour Union is a trade union representing textile workers in Pondicherry, India. It works to address workers' concerns, including fair wages, improved working conditions, and social security. PTLU is affiliated with the All India Trade Union Congress (AITUC), one of India's major trade union federations, which supports its efforts in labor advocacy and collective bargaining.

The union is led by its secretary, V.S. Abishegam, who oversees its activities and represents the interests of its members in negotiations with employers and authorities. PTLU focuses on addressing the needs of textile workers in Pondicherry, contributing to broader efforts to improve labor conditions in the region.
