= Punjab Breweries Workers Union =

Trade union in India

Punjab Breweries Workers Union, a trade union of brewery workers in Punjab, India. PBWU is affiliated to the All India Trade Union Congress. The president of PBWU is Gurbir Singh and the general secretary Kishan Chand.
