= Meerut Conspiracy case =

Controversial court case initiated in British Raj

Meerut Conspiracy Case
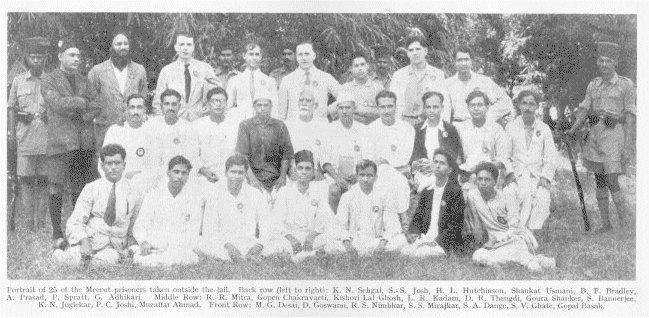
- Caption Portrait of 25 of the Meerut prisoners taken outside the jail. Back row (left to right): K. N. Sehgal, S. S. Josh, H. L. Hutchinson, Shaukat Usmani, B. F. Bradley, A. Prasad, P. Spratt, G. Adhikari. Middle row: R. R. Mitra, Gopen Chakravarti, Kishori Lal Ghosh, L. R. Kadam, D. R. Thengdi, Goura Shanker, S. Bannerjee, K. N. Joglekar, P. C. Joshi, Muzaffar Ahmad. Front row: M. G. Desai, D. Goswami, R. S. Nimbkar, S. S. Mirajkar, S. A. Dange, S. V. Ghate, Gopal Basak.
- Court: Court of Meerut, British Raj
- Decided: January 1933

The Meerut Conspiracy Case was a controversial court case that was initiated in British Raj in March 1929 and decided in 1933. Several trade unionists, including three Englishmen, were arrested for organizing an Indian railway strike. The British government prosecuted 27 leftist trade union leaders for conspiracy. The trial immediately caught attention in England, where it inspired the 1932 play Meerut by a Manchester street theatre group, the Red Megaphones, highlighting the detrimental effects of colonisation and industrialisation.

== Background ==
The British government was clearly worried about the growing influence of the Communist International. It was also thoroughly convinced that communist and socialist ideas were being spread to workers by the Communist Party of India (CPI). Its ultimate objective, the government perceived, was to achieve "complete paralysis and overthrow of existing Governments in every country (including India) by means of a general strike and armed uprising". The government's immediate response was to mount a conspiracy case, the Meerut Conspiracy Case.

In more than one way, the trial helped the Communist Party of India to consolidate its position among workers. CPI leader S. A. Dange, along with 32 other people, was arrested on or about 20 March 1929 and put on trial under Section 121A of the Indian Penal Code:

Whoever within or without British India conspires to commit any of the offences punishable by Section 121 or to deprive the King of the sovereignty of British India or any part thereof, or conspires to overawe, by means of criminal force or the show of criminal force, the Government of India or any local Government, shall be punished with transportation for life, or any shorter term, or with imprisonment of either description which may extend to ten years.

== Charges ==
The main charges were that in 1921, S. A. Dange, Shaukat Usmani, and Muzaffar Ahmad joined a conspiracy to establish a branch of the Communist International in India and were helped by various persons, including the accused Philip Spratt and Benjamin Francis Bradley, who were sent to India later by the Communist International. The aim of the accused persons, according to the charges raised against them, was under section 121-A of the Indian Penal Code (Act 45 of 1860):

... to deprive the King Emperor of the sovereignty of British India, and for such purpose to use the methods and carry out the programme and plan of campaign outlined and ordained by the Communist International.

The Sessions Court in Meerut imposed stringent sentences on the accused in January 1933. Of the accused, 27 persons were given various lengths of "transportation". Muzaffar Ahmed was transported for life, and Dange, Spratt, Ghate, Joglekar, and Nimbkar were awarded transportation for a period of 12 years. On appeal, in August 1933, the sentences of Ahmed, Dange, and Usmani were reduced to three years by Sir Shah Muhammad Sulaiman Chief Justice of the Allahabad High Court, on the grounds that the accused had already spent a considerable part of their sentence while they waited for the trial to be decided and because:

... in the case of political offences, arising out of the beliefs of the accused, severe sentences defeat their object. In practice such sentences confirm the offenders in their beliefs and create other offenders, thus increasing the evil and the danger to the public.

The sentences of the others convicted were also reduced.

The convictions of Desai, Hutchinson, Mitra, Jhabwala, Sehgal, Kasle, Gauri Shankar, Kadara, and Alve were overturned on appeal.

== Impact ==
All the accused were communists. The charges framed against them showed the British government's fear of the growth of communist ideas in India. In the trial, all of the accused were labelled as Bolsheviks. For four-and-a-half years, the defendants turned the courtroom into a public platform to espouse their cause. As a result, the trial saw strengthening of the communist movement in the country. Harkishan Singh Surjeet, a former General Secretary of the Communist Party of India (Marxist), wrote about the aftermath of the Meerut Conspiracy Case:

... a Party with a centralised apparatus, came into being only after the release of the Meerut prisoners, in 1933. The Meerut Conspiracy Case, though launched to suppress the communist movement, provided the opportunity for communists to propagate their ideas. It came out with its own manifesto and was affiliated to the Communist International in 1934.

== See also ==
- Kanpur Bolshevik Conspiracy case
- Peshawar Conspiracy Cases
- Revolutionary movement for Indian independence
