= Sohan Singh Josh =

Indian freedom fighter and communist activist (1898–1982)

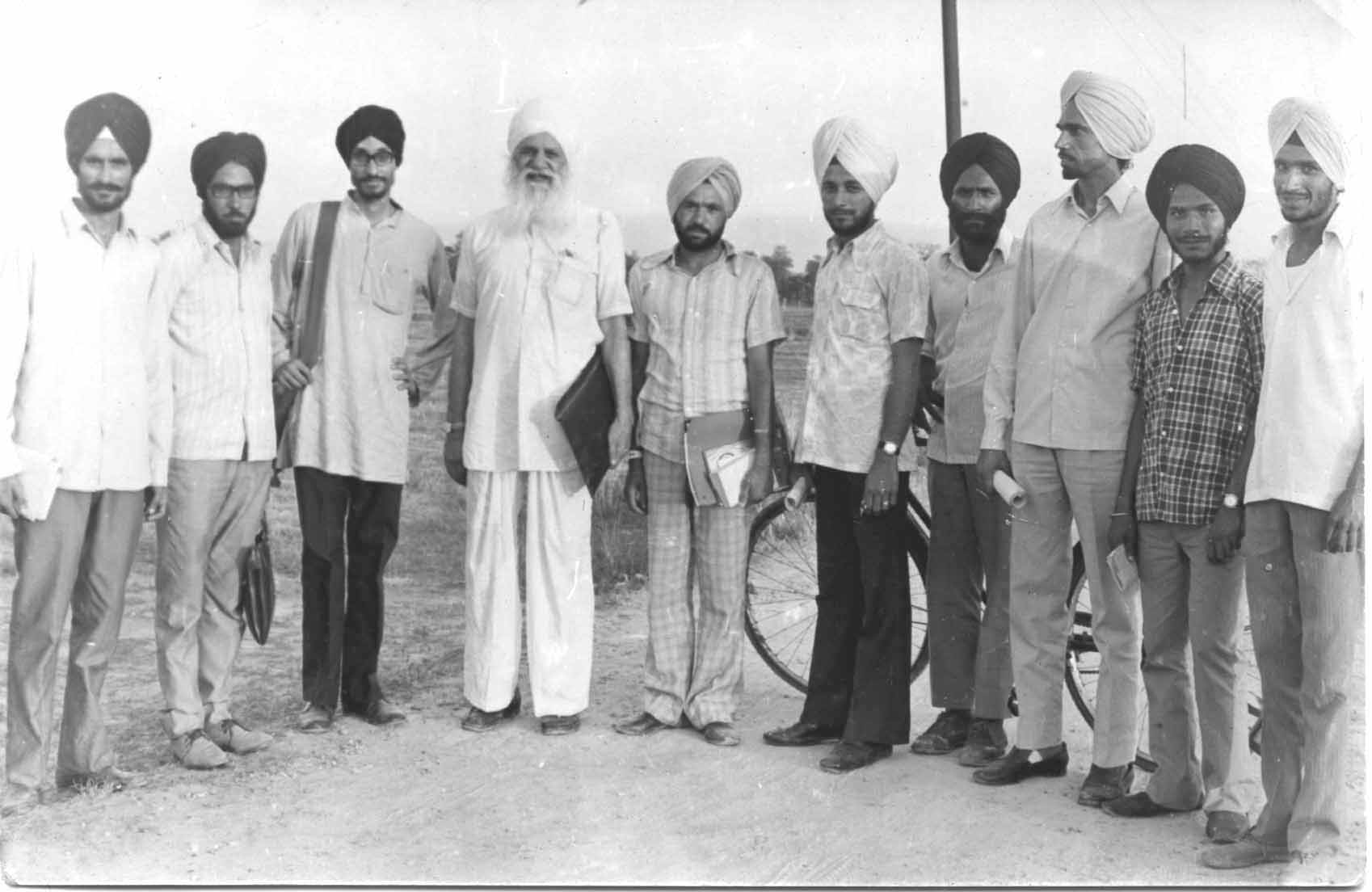
- Sohan Singh Josh with young Punjabi writers, 1974
- Born: 12 November 1898; Amritsar, Punjab, British India
- Died: 29 July 1982 (aged 83); Amritsar, Punjab, India
- Occupations: Independence activist; politician
- Political party: Communist Party of India

Sohan Singh Josh (1898–1982) was an Indian communist activist and freedom fighter.

== Life ==
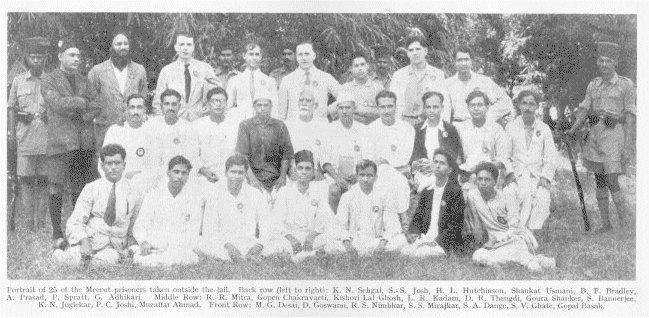
Portrait of 25 of the Meerut prisoners taken outside the jail. Back row (left to right): K. N. Sehgal, S. S. Josh, H. L. Hutchinson, Shaukat Usmani, B. F. Bradley, A. Prasad, P. Spratt, G. Adhikari. Middle row: R. R. Mitra, Gopen Chakravarti, Kishori Lal Ghosh, L. R. Kadam, D. R. Thengdi, Goura Shanker, S. Bannerjee, K. N. Joglekar, P. C. Joshi, Muzaffar Ahmad. Front row: M. G. Desai, D. Goswami, R. S. Nimbkar, S. S. Mirajkar, S. A. Dange, S. V. Ghate, Gopal Basak.

Josh was born on 12 November 1898 in the village of Chetanpura in the Amritsar district, Punjab Province, British India. His father, Lal Singh, wished for his son to be educated, but there was no school nearby, so Sohan Singh entered school rather late. He passed the Middle standard examination from Church Mission School, Majitha, and the Matriculation examination from D. A. V. School, Amritsar. For his tertiary education, Josh joined the Khalsa College, Amritsar, but had to leave soon after owing to financial difficulties.

Following his short tenure at Khalsa College, Josh went to Hubli in the Bengal Presidency and later to Bombay where he worked up to 1918 in the Censor's office. He returned to Amritsar later to pursue a career as a school teacher.

In 1921, Josh took an active interest in the Akali movement for the liberation of gurdwaras from mahants. Josh zealously opposed the British Raj in India and, as a result of his anti-British activities, was arrested. He was tried and sentenced to three years' imprisonment. At that time, he became a member of the Shiromani Gurudwara Parbandhak Committee and the Shiromani Akali Dal. Josh was a prolific writer. In 1925 he helped to bring out a revolutionary paper, Kirti, which was the main vehicle for Bhagat Singh to propagate his ideas.

Josh was a leader of both the Kirti Kisan Party and the Naujawan Bharat Sabha, being one of several people who were prominent in both organizations simultaneously. He was imprisoned for his role in the Meerut Conspiracy Case, was released in November 1933, and thereafter aligned himself with the Communist Party of India.

In 1943, he became the editor of a newly founded communist paper, Jang-i-Azadi ("War of Independence").
