= Federation of Chatkal Mazdoor Unions =

Indian trade union

Federation of Chatkal Mazdoor Unions, a trade union of jute mill workers in West Bengal, India. The union is affiliated to the All India Trade Union Congress. The general secretary of FCMU is Debasish Dutta.

In June 2014, the Federation was among the 20 unions who demanded withdrawal of all false cases and an unconditional release of all the workers arrested after the lynching of a jute mill chief executive officer in Hooghly district.

In March 2017, it joined other unions to announce a two month protest and demanded wage hike and clearance of dues. The then joint general secretary of the Union, Pranesh Biswas, alleged that the managements have not paid ESI and Provident Fund contributions by the employees, amounting to the tune of over Rs. 500 crores, to the appropriate authorities.

In June 2023, the Union demanded Centre's intervention to address and solve the problems of the jute industry in Bengal which is in doldrums. The general secretary, Pranesh Biswas, wrote to Union Textiles Minister Giriraj Singh narrating the problems jute mills in West Bengal including the sub-optimal functioning of the Jute Corporation of India resulting in speculative practices that disadvantage the jute growers, and the plight of the mill workers after COVID-19.
