= Langal =

Magazine edited by Kazi Nazrul Islam

Langal (Bengali for plough) was a Bengali leftist-literary magazine published from Kolkata in the early 20th century. It was edited by Kazi Nazrul Islam.

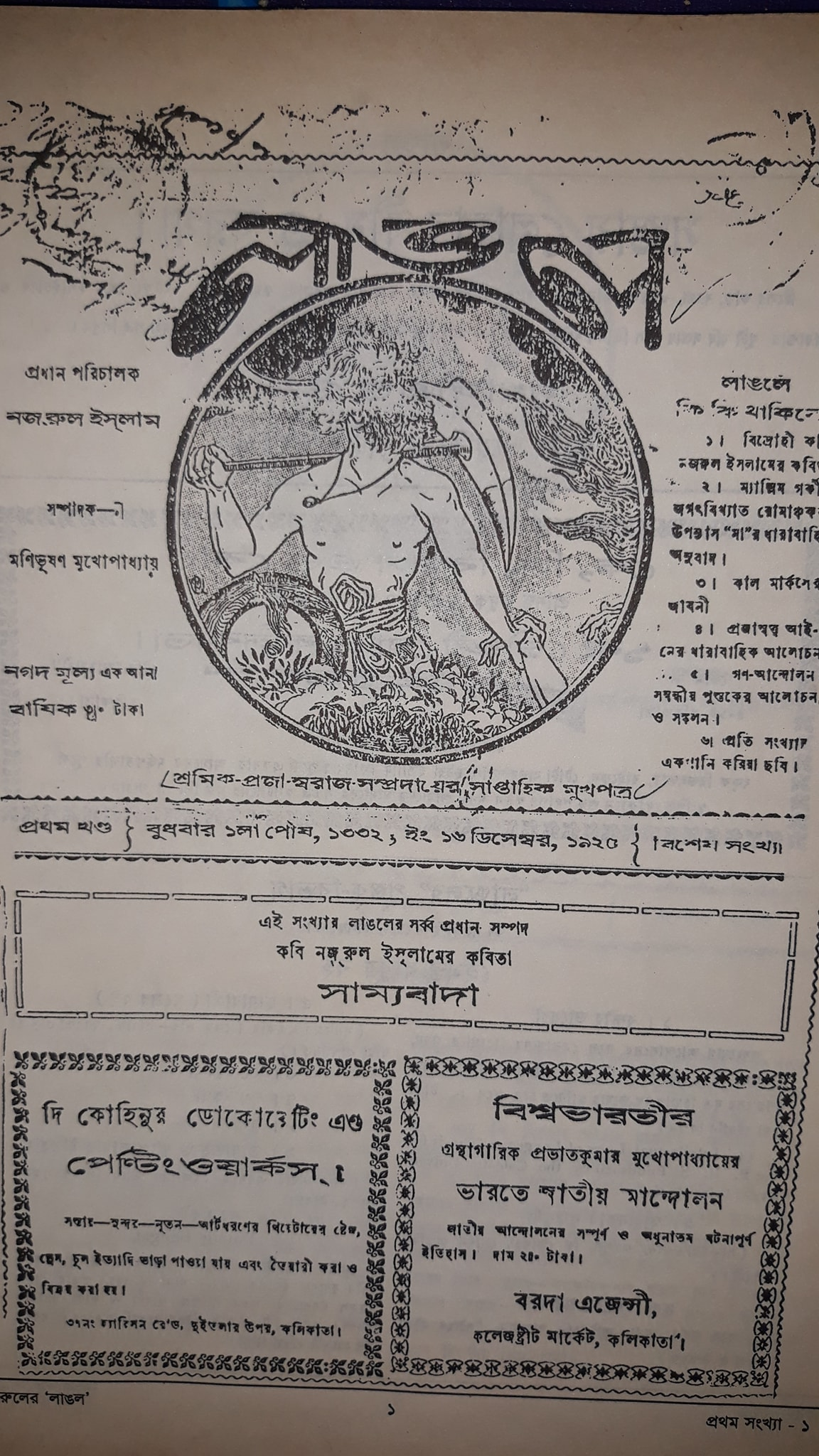
The first issue of Langal

== History ==
Langal started publication on 16 December 1925. Langal was the second magazine edited by Kazi Nazrul Islam, the first being Dhumketu. It was the official publication of the Labour Swaraj Party. It published poems about the working class and articles on famous socialists and communists of the era. The first issue printed five thousand copies and sold them all. Rabindranath Tagore wrote a piece for magazine at the request of Kazi Nazrul Islam.

The last issue of the magazine was published on 21 January 1926.

In May 2001, on Nazrul's hundred birth anniversary, Nazrul Institute published a book called Nazruler Langal on the magazine. The author was Mohammad Nurul Huda.
