= S. S. Mirajkar =

Indian politician and trade unionist (1899–1980)

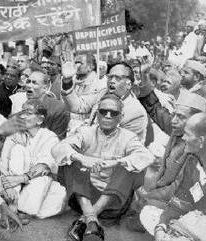
- S. S. Mirajkar at a 1958 rally of the Samyukta Maharashtra Samiti

Mayor of Bombay
- In office 1958–1959
- Preceded by: M. V. Donde
- Succeeded by: P. T. Borale

President of the All India Trade Union Congress
- In office 1957–1973
- Preceded by: V. Chakkarai Chettiyar
- Succeeded by: Ranen Sen

Personal details
- Born: 8 February 1899 Karavali College, Mangaon Taluk, Raigarh District, Bombay Presidency, British India
- Died: 15 February 1980 (aged 81)
- Party: Communist Party of India Communist Party of India (Marxist) (1964–1970)
- Occupation: Trade unionist

Shantaram Savlaram Mirajkar (8 February 1899 – 15 February 1980) was an Indian communist politician and trade unionist. He was part of the old guard of the Communist Party of India, led the All India Trade Union Congress as its president for many years and served as mayor of Bombay.

== Early communist movement in India ==
In the early 1920s, Mirajkar, S. A. Dange, and S. V. Ghate constituted the early communist leadership that emerged within India, and who resented the role played by the emigre leadership who formed the Communist Party of India in Tashkent in 1920. He began organizing trade unions of textile workers in Bombay. When the Workers and Peasants Party was founded in Bombay in January 1927, Mirajkar became its general secretary. Mirajkar was tried and convicted in the Meerut Conspiracy Case.

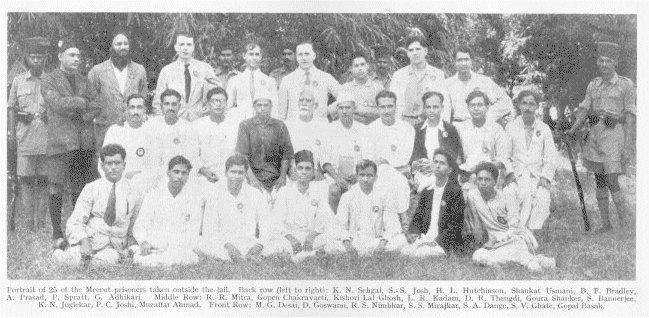
Portrait of 25 of the Meerut prisoners taken outside the jail. Back row (left to right): K. N. Sehgal, S. S. Josh, H. L. Hutchinson, Shaukat Usmani, B. F. Bradley, A. Prasad, P. Spratt, G. Adhikari. Middle row: R. R. Mitra, Gopen Chakravarti, Kishori Lal Ghosh, L. R. Kadam, D. R. Thengdi, Goura Shanker, S. Bannerjee, K. N. Joglekar, P. C. Joshi, Muzaffar Ahmad. Front row: M. G. Desai, D. Goswami, R. S. Nimbkar, S. S. Mirajkar, S. A. Dange, S. V. Ghate, Gopal Basak.

In 1940–1941, Mirajkar was detained at Deoli Detention Camp in Ajmer-Merwara. He was arrested again in August 1949, along with many other communist trade unionists.

== AITUC president and mayor ==
Mirajkar served as President of the All India Trade Union Congress between 1957 and 1973. Mirajkar was elected mayor of Bombay in 1958.

== CPI split and later years ==
When the so-called "Dange Letters" surfaced in 1964, Mirajkar affirmed that they were authentic. Mirajkar would side with the Communist Party of India (Marxist) in the 1964 CPI split. However, Mirajkar's decision to side with the left in the CPI split was not an issue of ideology, but of personal conflict with S. A. Dange. Prior to the split Mirajkar had belonged to the Dange-led right-wing faction in the party. When the CPI(M) Politburo called for a boycott of the January 1970 AITUC session in Guntur, Mirajkar refused to comply with the party directive and participated anyway. Mirajkar was subsequently expelled from CPI(M).

He rejoined the CPI in 1973, persuaded by C. Rajeswara Rao. He retired as AITUC President in 1973, and was succeeded by Dr. Ranen Sen. Mirajkar died in a Bombay nursing home on 15 February 1980, at the age of 79.
