= Shaukat Usmani =

Indian politician (1901–1978)

Shaukat Usmani (Maulla Bux Usta) (1901–1978) was an early Indian communist. Shaukat (pron. Shavkat) was born to the Usta artisan family of Bikaner. He became a member of the émigré Communist Party of India (Tashkent group) when it was established in 1920. He was a founding member of the Communist Party of India (CPI) that formed in Kanpur in 1925. He was the first candidate to stand for a British Parliament election while housed in an Indian jail. He had been sentenced to a total of 16 years after being convicted in the Kanpur (Cawnpore) Case of 1923, and the Meerut Conspiracy Case of 1929.

== In émigré Communist Party of India ==
M. N. Roy, an ex-member of the Anushilan Samiti—a secret revolutionary organization operating in East Bengal at the beginning of the 20th century—travelled to Moscow in April 1920. Six months later, he founded the émigré Communist Party of India at Tashkent. The fledgling Tashkent party, with Usmani as a leading activist, joined the Communist International (Comintern) in 1921.

Roy had been sent by Vladimir Lenin to Tashkent as head of the Indian Military School, and of the Central Asiatic Bureau of Comintern, to train an Indian army of revolutionaries. The military school trained many Muslim volunteers (muhajireens) who were en route to Turkey to fight for the restoration of the Caliphate. The school was closed in April 1921 as a quid pro quo for industrial assistance that Britain promised to Soviet Russia under the Anglo-Russian Trade Pact of March 1921. After the closure, the Comintern launched the Communist University of the Toilers of the East in Moscow. Usmani was one of the muhajireens who was tutored both in Moscow and Tashkent.

Early in 1922, 13 members of the émigré Tashkent communists crossed the Pamirs and reached India. They were arrested and jailed in the Moscow-Peshawar conspiracy case. Usmani was not in the initial jailed group, but in a later batch to whom the British government attached the Kanpur conspiracy case. The Tashkent-Moscow alumni, who were dispersed throughout India, were not on good terms with the local communist leadership under S. A. Dange, Muzaffar Ahmed, S. S. Mirajkar, and S. V. Ghate.

In the mid-1920s, tensions were building between the émigré Indian communists and the Communist Party of Great Britain (CPGB), although the problems stayed hidden due to the secrecy necessitated by strict police surveillance. By this stage, Usmani was operating underground in India using the nom de guerre Sikander Sur. His Comintern code name was D A Naoroji (sometimes wrongly rendered as Naoradji), and he attended the 6th World Congress of the Communist International in 1928.

== Kanpur Conspiracy Case ==
After the Peshawar case in 1922, the British government prosecuted two more conspiracy cases, in Kanpur in 1924 and Meerut in 1929. The accused included Communist Party organisers in India, such as S. A. Dange, Muzaffar Ahmed, Nalini Gupta and S. V. Ghate, and members of the émigré party, such as Usmani and Rafiq Ahmad.

On 17 March 1924, Usmani, M. N. Roy, S. A. Dange, Muzaffar Ahmed, Nalini Gupta, Singaravelu Chettiar, Ghulam Hussain and several others were charged with seeking "to deprive the King Emperor of his sovereignty of British India, by complete separation of India from Britain by a violent revolution", in what was called the Cawnpore (now spelt Kanpur) Bolshevik Conspiracy case. The case created notoriety concerning an alleged Comintern plan to foment revolution in India: "Pages of newspapers daily splashed sensational communist plans and people for the first time learned such a large scale about communism and its doctrines and the aims of the Communist International in India."

Singaravelu Chettiar was released on account of illness. M. N. Roy was out of the country and therefore could not be arrested. Ghulam Hussain confessed that he had received money from the Russians in Kabul and was pardoned. Muzaffar Ahmed, Shaukat Usmani and Dange were sentenced to four years imprisonment. This highly publicized case was considered a key factor in introducing communism to the Indian masses.

Britain triumphantly declared that the Kanpur case had "finished off the communists". But the industrial town of Kanpur witnessed in December 1925 a conference of different communist groups, under the chairmanship of Singaravelu Chettiar. Among the key organizers were Dange, Muzaffar Ahmed, Nalini Gupta, and Usmani. The conference adopted a resolution to form a new Communist Party of India (CPI) with headquarters in Bombay (now: Mumbai). Because of the British Government's extreme hostility toward Bolsheviks, the CPI decided to not operate as an avowed communist party, but instead to set up a non-federated platform under the name, Workers and Peasants Party.

== Meerut Conspiracy Case ==
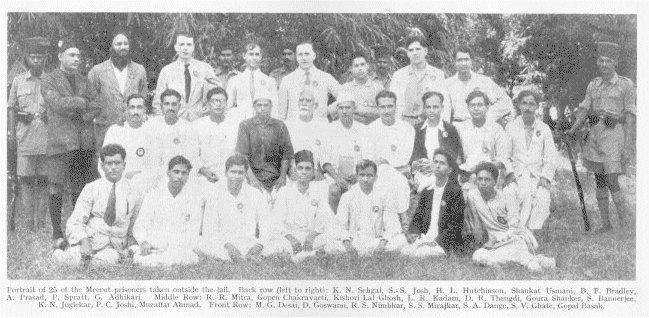
Portrait of 25 of the Meerut prisoners taken outside the jail. Back row (left to right): K. N. Sehgal, S. S. Josh, H. L. Hutchinson, Shaukat Usmani, B. F. Bradley, A. Prasad, P. Spratt, G. Adhikari. Middle row: R. R. Mitra, Gopen Chakravarti, Kishori Lal Ghosh, L. R. Kadam, D. R. Thengdi, Goura Shanker, S. Bannerjee, K. N. Joglekar, P. C. Joshi, Muzaffar Ahmed. Front row: M. G. Desai, D. Goswami, R. S. Nimbkar, S. S. Mirajkar, S. A. Dange, S. V. Ghate, Gopal Basak.

The British Government was worried about the growing influence of the Comintern in India. The government's immediate response was to initiate the Meerut Conspiracy Case. Usmani along with 32 persons were arrested in March 1929 and put on trial under Section 121A of the Indian Penal Code, which declares:

Whoever within or without British India conspires to commit any of the offenses punishable by Section 121 or to deprive the King of the sovereignty of British India or any part thereof, or conspires to overawe, by means of criminal force or the show of criminal force, the Government of India or any local Government, shall be punished with transportation for life, or any shorter term, or with imprisonment of either description which may extend to ten years.

=== The charges ===
Though all the accused were not communists, the charges against them revealed the government's fear of the growth of communist ideas in India: As an example of the wide net being cast, Lester Hutchinson "was arrested as an afterthought when he took up the task of carrying on some of the trade union and agitational work after the arrest of the others". He was in fact a journalist at the Indian Daily Mail and unconnected with the Labour movement, but still spent four years in prison.

The main charges against Usmani, Dange, and Ahmed were that they had entered into a conspiracy in 1921 to establish a branch of the Communist International in India, and that they were helped by various persons including the accused Philip Spratt and Benjamin Francis Bradley, who had been sent to India by the Comintern. The alleged aim of the accused was "to deprive the King Emperor of the sovereignty of British India, and for such purpose to use the methods and carry out the programme and plan of campaign outlined and ordained by the Communist International."

In January 1933, the Sessions Court in Meerut handed out stringent sentences. 27 persons were convicted with various durations of "transportation". While Ahmed was transported for life, Dange, Spratt, Ghate, Joglekar and Nimbkar were each transported for a period of twelve years. Usmani was given ten years. On appeal, in July 1933, the sentences of Usmani, Ahmed, and Dange were reduced to three years "Rigorous Imprisonment".

== Communist candidate from Spen Valley ==
During the Meerut trial, Usmani stood unsuccessfully as a CPGB candidate in a British general election—while he was confined to a prison cell in India—in the 1929 general election for the constituency of Spen Valley. He is believed to be the only candidate ever to stand in a British General Election whilst residing in India. The Spen Valley seat was significant since it was the focus of an attempt by Sir John Simon, leader of a pro-Tory group of right-leaning Liberals, to get back into Parliament. Simon had declared in 1926 that the General Strike was illegal, and he headed the Simon Commission in 1930 to report on the situation in India.

Usmani's selection as candidate arose from his prominence in the Meerut trial. Since he was a prisoner thousands of miles away, he was unable to conduct the campaign himself. A deputy, Billy Brain, was chosen to represent Usmani and campaign on his behalf. Communists from many parts of Britain converged on Spen Valley. The campaign was successful in the sense that it gave visibility to the Meerut trial and the harshness of British rule in India, which were hitherto unknown to many.

== Candidate from South East St Pancras ==
The lengthy Meerut trial enabled the Communist Party to again run Usmani in the 1931 general election for St. Pancras South East against Tory South African mining millionaire, Sir Alfred Lane Beit. The CPGB sought to use Usmani's candidacy to promote freedom for India, and to highlight the plight of the Meerut prisoners. In this election, the communists polled 75,000 votes, which was a 50% increase over the 1929 election tally. Still, the CPGB was dismayed at the result. Harry Pollitt, the new general secretary of the Party, expected that between 150,00 and 200,000 would vote communist. He was shocked, and told a meeting of the British Commission of the Communist International that he could not understand why after two Labour Governments, and the betrayal of the General Strike, that still almost seven million workers could vote Labour.

== Later life ==
The British Government expected that in the aftermath of the Meerut case, the CPI would be discredited and weakened. Instead, a stronger CPI emerged. Following the release of the Meerut prisoners in 1933, a party with a centralized apparatus took shape. In 1934 the CPI put out its own manifesto and became affiliated with the Communist International. However, Usmani did not figure in the Party building exercise. The leadership had gone to local (as opposed to émigré Tashkent-Moscow cadre) communists like S.A. Dange, P.C. Joshi, P. Sundarayya etc. Nothing much had been heard about Usmani after release from the jail.

Similar fate happened to other members of the émigré CPI. Muhammad Ali Sepassi, M. N. Roy's close aide stayed back in Paris and was shot dead by the Nazis in 1940. Muhammed Shafique, first secretary of émigré CPI, wandered about in Europe until 1932 and then vanished. Abdulla Safdar came to India only in 1933 when most of the comrades were booked under the Meerut case. He remained with M. N. Roy, who had by then, had only little standing in the international communist movement. G. A .K. Lohani who had joined Roy in 1921 never returned to India. Like other émigré CPI members, Usmani also slipped into oblivion.

After release from Meerut, Usmani worked in BB&CI Railway Workers' Union, was arrested on 14 July 1940 in Agra, shifted to Deoli Camp, then to Bareilly, Fatehgarh etc, being released on 8 January 1945. He became general secretary of National Seafarers' Union in Bombay during RIN revolt of 1946. He was not allowed to return to India, so went to London in September 1952 but returned to Bombay after 72 days. Working as a firm manager, he left again for London in 1955 and began research work regularly in British Museum Library, doing odd jobs.

Usmani joined British Labor Party and its executive. He used its platform to propagate the cause of Goa liberation struggle. Simultaneously, he continued his research till 1961, resulting in the book "Nutritive Values of Fruits, Vegetables, Nuts and Food Cures", a widely appreciated work. He rejected offers of British citizenship and returned to India in 1962. He then shifted to Cairo, Egypt, in 1964 and remained there till 1974, working as a journalist in the Egyptian Gazette, Lotus of AAPSO, etc. He also worked in Al Fatah of the PLO.

Upon return to India in 1974, Usmani joined the CPI. He worked for some time with Dr Adhikari in Ajoy Bhavan, his co-prisoner in Meerut. He went to Bikaner at the request of CPI comrades there in 1976 to celebrate his 75th birth anniversary. He had left Bikaner in 1920. Shaukat Usmani died on 26 February 1978. His son and other family members lived in extreme penury.

== Books ==
Peshawar to Moscow Leaves from an Indian Muhajireen's diary, Shaukat Usmani's earliest book was published by Swarajya Publishing House, Benares in 1927. Much later in life, Usmani published a book on the same theme, Historic Trips of a Revolutionary - Sojourn in the Soviet Union. The book gives an account of Usmai's part in the émigré Communist Party of India, and other examples of progress in his homeland like the Indian Military School. He gives colorful descriptions of his stays in Moscow, during which he lodges at the Hotel Delovoi Dior (which has a meaning something akin to the “Business Courtyard”), and boards at the Hotel De Lux, once a gathering place for Communist leaders from all over the world. He also describes a trip from Tashkent through Ukraine to Crimea. This book is focused mainly on the Middle Eastern states of the Soviet Union.

Usmani published in 1939 Char Yatri in Hindi and Char Musafir in Urdu and later in English as Four Travellers. It is an account of a journey of four Indian revolutionaries through Jagdalak, Kabul, Mazar-i-Sharif, Termiz, Bukhara and Samarkand. He had also published a collection of eight short stories in 1951 called Night of the Eclipse (Karachi: Usta Publications).

== See also ==
- M. N. Roy
- Shripad Amrit Dange
