= Maniben Kara =

Indian social worker and trade unionist

- Maniben Kara
- Born: 1905; Bombay, British India (now Mumbai, Maharashtra, India)
- Died: 1979 (aged 73–74)
- Occupations: Social worker, trade unionist
- Awards: Padma Shri

Maniben Kara (1905–1979) was an Indian social worker and trade unionist. She was a founder member of the Hind Mazdoor Sabha and served as its president. She was honoured by the Government of India in 1970 with Padma Shri, the fourth highest Indian civilian award.

== Early life ==
Born in 1905 in Bombay, British India (now Mumbai) in a middle-class family to an Arya Samaj member, Maniben Kara did her schooling at St. Columba High School, Gamdevi, Mumbai and secured a diploma in Social science from the University of Birmingham.

== Career ==
Returning to India in 1929, she got involved with the Independence movement, founded Seva Mandir and a printing press and published Independent India, a nationalist publication for the Indian revolutionary, M. N. Roy. Later, she was known to have been influenced by Narayan Malhar Joshi, one of the early leaders of the All India Trade Union Congress, and started engaging in trade union activism. Her area of operations was at the slums of Mumbai, the dwelling place of many of the conservancy workers of the Bombay Improvement Trust. She established a Mothers' Club and a Healthcare Centre and spread the message of hygiene and literacy among the slum dwellers. Later she started social organization called Seva Mandir, which was later merged with NGO called Bhangini Samaj.

The next stage of her work started with organizing workers' unions at Mumbai port and dockyard which later expanded to cover the tailors and textile workers. She joined the All India Trade Union Congress, the trade union arm of the Communist Party of India, and led several labour strikes which led to her arrest and solitary confinement in 1932. After Formation of Congress Ministries in 1937, All India Trade Union Congress and Indian National Congress drifted apart. Maniben was member of Royis Party led by M N Roy. Royst Party Started New central Trade Union Organization named Indian Federation of Labour (IFL). She continued her activities through the days of Indian freedom struggle and was nominated to the Central Legislative Assembly in 1946, entrusted with the responsibility of the labour ministry. Post Independence, After Partition IFL joined Hind Mazdoor Sabha. She was a key member when the Hind Mazdoor Sabha was formed in 1948 and was also involved with the All India Railwaymen's Federation and was its former president. She was also a founding member of the International Confederation of Free Trade Unions (ICFTU) and was involved with government committees such as National Committee on the Status of Women and other government initiatives.

Maniben Kara, who never contested in a political election, was honoured by the Government of India with the civilian award of Padma Shri in 1970. Nine years later, she died, at the age of 74. Hind Mazdoor Sabha honoured her by establishing an institute in her name, the Maniben Kara Institute (MKI), in 1980. The Western Railways Union started a trust in her honour, the Maniben Kara Foundation, and maintains the Maniben Kara Foundation Hall, in Grant Road area in Mumbai.

== See also ==
- Trade Unionism
- Hind Mazdoor Sabha
- International Confederation of Free Trade Unions
- All India Trade Union Congress
- M. N. Roy
- Narayan Malhar Joshi
