= S.V. Deshpande =

Indian Communist Party leader

S.V. Deshpande was an acting General Secretary of the Communist Party of India in 1931 to 1933 when others were in Meerut jail. And he was the president of AITUC from 1929 to 1931.
