= Visakha Steel Employees' Congress =

Trade union in India

V.S.E.C.
- Visakha Steel Employees' Congress
- Location: India
- Key people: M. Rajashekar (General Secretary), Gandham Venkata Rao (President)
- Affiliations: Indian National Trade Union Congress

Visakha Steel Employees' Congress, the recognized trade union at the Visakhapatnam Steel Plant, in Visakhapatnam, India. VSEC is affiliated to the Indian National Trade Union Congress. The general secretary of VSEC is Mantri Rajshekar and the President is Gandham Venkata Rao.

In April 2016, they submitted a 59 point charter of demands to the management to convene a meeting to solve the pending demands. In September 2022, the Union demanded implementation of the Wage Settlement which was due from 2017.
