= Patiala Airport =

Patiala Airport Civil Aerodrome Patiala
- IATA: none; ICAO: VIPL

Summary
- Airport type: Government
- Owner: Government of Punjab
- Serves: Patiala
- Location: Sangrur Road
- Elevation AMSL: 820 ft / 250 m
- Coordinates: 30°18′53″N 076°21′47″E

Map
- Location of airport in India VIPL (India)

Runways
Direction	Length		Surface
Direction	ft	m	Surface
15/33	3,830	1,167	Asphalt

Patiala Airport (Patiala Aviation Complex) is a civil aerodrome located in Patiala, Punjab in India. Patiala Air Club is based here and it has a fleet of 4 Cessna 172, 2 FA152, 1 Beech 58 and operated 1 Technam P2006T.
