= Ranen Sen =

Indian politician

Ranendranath Sen (23 September 1909 – 13 November 2003) was an Indian communist politician and trade unionist. He was the president of All India Trade Union Congress from 1973 to 1976. He was member of the 3rd Lok Sabha, 4th Lok Sabha and 5th Lok Sabha from Barasat constituency. He was elected to the West Bengal Legislative Assembly in 1952 and 1957 from Maniktala Assembly constituency. He was previously associated with National Revolutionary Movement in undivided Bengal-Jugantar Party.

== Position Held ==
- Licentiate of Medical Faculty, National Medical Institute, Calcutta; President,
- Bengal Provincial Trade Union Congress; Vice-President
- Member, National Council of the Communist Party of India
