= Sibnath Banerjee =

Indian revolutionary

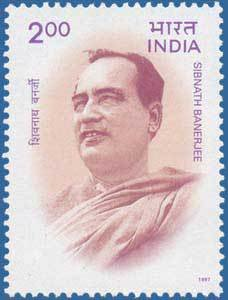
Postage stamp commemorating Baner

Sibnath Banerjee was an Indian revolutionary and trade union leader who founded the Hind Mazdoor Sabha, and served as President of the All India Trade Union Congress.

== Personal life ==
He was born on 11 July 1897. In 1935, he was arrested by the British government. He died on 16 February 1937.

== Honor ==
In 1997, the India Post honored him by issuing a commemorative stamp.

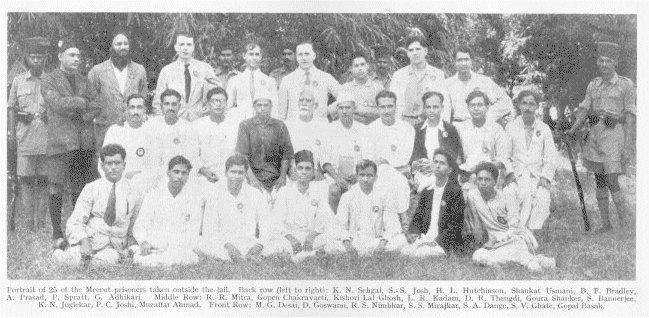
Portrait of 25 of the Meerut prisoners taken outside the jail. Back row (left to right): K. N. Sehgal, S. S. Josh, H. L. Hutchinson, Shaukat Usmani, B. F. Bradley, A. Prasad, P. Spratt, G. Adhikari. Middle row: R. R. Mitra, Gopen Chakravarti, Kishori Lal Ghosh, L. R. Kadam, D. R. Thengdi, Goura Shanker, S. Bannerjee, K. N. Joglekar, P. C. Joshi, Muzaffar Ahmad. Front row: M. G. Desai, D. Goswami, R. S. Nimbkar, S. S. Mirajkar, S. A. Dange, S. V. Ghate, Gopal Basak.
