= Workers and Peasants Party (India) =

Political party in India

Workers and Peasants Party Kirti Kisan Sabha/Kirti Kisan Party
- Abbreviation: WPP
- President: Sohan Singh Josh (All India President)
- Secretary-General: R.S. Nimbkar
- Founded: 1925
- Dissolved: 1929
- Preceded by: Labour Swaraj Party
- Headquarters: Calcutta, Bengal
- Newspaper: Langal; Ganavani; Kirti (Punjab); Lal Nishan (Hindi)
- Student wing: Young Comrades League
- Youth wing: Young Comrades League
- Ideology: Communism; Socialism
- Political position: Left-wing
- National affiliation: League Against Imperialism (briefly)

The Workers and Peasants Party (WPP) (also known as the Kirti Kisan Sabha in Punjab) was a political party in India, which worked inside the Indian National Congress in 1925–1929. It became an important front organisation for the Communist Party of India and an influential force in the Bombay labour movement. The party was able to muster some success in making alliances with other left elements inside the Congress Party, amongst them Jawaharlal Nehru. However, as the Communist International entered its 'Third Period' phase, the communists deserted the WPP project. The WPP was wound up, as its leadership was arrested by the British authorities in March 1929 in Meerut Conspiracy Case.

== Founding of the party ==
The party was founded in Bengal on 1 November 1925, as the Labour Swaraj Party of the Indian National Congress. The founding leaders of the party were Kazi Nazrul Islam, Hemanta Kumar Sarkar, Qutubuddin Ahmad and Shamsuddin Hussain. The founding manifesto was signed by Kazi Nazrul Islam. During the first three month of existence, the party organisation was very provisional.

At the All Bengal Praja Conference, held at Krishnagar on 6 February 1926, a resolution was moved by Faizuddin Hussian Sahib of Mymensingh for the creation of a workers-peasants party. The move was seconded by Braja Nath Das of Bogra. The resolution was passed by the conference, and in accordance with this decision the name of the party was changed to 'Workers and Peasants Party of Bengal'. Dr. Nares Chandra Sen-Gupta was elected party president and Hemanta Kumar Sarkar and Qutubuddin Ahmad were elected as joint secretaries.

== Build-up of the WPPs of Bengal and Bombay ==
As of 1926, the WPP of Bengal had only 40 members, and its growth in membership was very slow. A two-room party office was set up at 37, Harrison Road, Calcutta. British intelligence perceived that the Bengal Jute Workers Association, the Mymensingh Workers and Peasants Party (with branch in Atia), the Dhakeswari Mill Workers Union, the Bengal Glass Workers Union, the Scavengers' Union of Bengal (with branches in Howrah, Dacca and Mymensingh) and the Workers Protection League were led by the party.

Soon after the 1926 conference of the WPP of Bengal, the underground Communist Party of India directed its members to join the provincial Workers and Peasants Parties. All open communist activities were carried out through Workers and Peasants Parties. The Comintern organiser M.N. Roy took part in the build-up of the WPP.

A WPP was formed in Bombay in January 1927. D.R. Thengdi was elected president and S.S. Mirajkar general secretary. The WPPs gained influence within the Bombay and Bengal Pradesh Congress Committees. From the WPP of Bombay, K.N. Joglekar, R.S. Nimbkar and D.R. Tengdi were elected to the All India Congress Committee. From the WPP of Bengal, two party representatives were elected to the AICC. The WPP representatives together with Nehru were able to convince the AICC to make the Indian National Congress an associate member of the League against Imperialism.

== Madras Congress ==
At the 1927 annual Congress session in Madras a leader of the WPP of Bombay, K.N. Joglekar presented a proposal for a resolution in the Subjects Committee, that the Indian National Congress should demand full independence for India. The proposal was seconded by Jawaharlal Nehru. At the open session of the Madras Congress, Nehru moved the resolution and Joglekar seconded it. The resolution was passed unanimously. This was the first time in history that the Indian National Congress officially demanded full independence from British rule. During the Madras session, the WPP functioned as a faction. Directly after the Madras Congress, the WPP took part in a 'Republican Congress' meeting together with other left elements of the Congress Party and radical trade unionists. Nehru chaired the meeting.

== Trade union struggles ==
Particularly the WPP of Bombay was successful in mobilising trade union work. It built unions amongst printing press, municipal and dock workers. It gained influence amongst the workers of the Great Indian Peninsular Railway. During 1928 the WPP led a general strike in Bombay, which lasted for months. At the time of the strike, the Girni Kamgar Union was founded.

== Anti-Simon struggle ==
During the protests against the Simon Commission, the WPP played a major role in organising manifestations in Calcutta and Bombay. In Bombay it also mobilised 'hartal' (general strike) in protest against the Simon Commission.

== 1928 Bengal party conference ==
The WPP of Bengal held its third conference in Bhatpara, in March 1928. After the conference the executive of the party published the conference documents in a book titled A Call for Action. In the book an argument is presented that national independence was not possible as long as capitalists dominated the freedom struggle. British intelligence sources claimed that Philip Spratt had been the author of the book.

== Formation of WPPs in Punjab and UP ==
At a conference in Lyallpur in September 1928 the Punjab Kirti Kisan Party (Workers and Peasants Party of Punjab) was formed by the Kirti group. Chabil Das, a Lahore propagandist of the Naujawan Bharat Sabha, was elected president of the party. In October 1928 two WPPs were formed in the United Provinces. One of them was the Bundelkhand Workers and Peasants Party, with N.L. Kadam as its secretary and headquartered in Jhansi. The party held its founding conference in Jhansi on 28–29 October 1928. Jhavwala from Bombay presided over the conference. The other was the U.P. Peasants and Workers Party which was founded at a conference in Meerut. P.C. Joshi was elected president and Dharamvir Singh was elected general secretary The Meerut conference was attended by Philip Spratt, Muzaffar Ahmed and Kedar Nath Sahgol.

== All India WPP conference ==
In late November 1928 the WPP of Bengal executive committee met with Philip Spratt and Muzaffar Ahmed. They decided to appoint Sohan Singh Josh of the Punjab Kirti Kisan Party to chair the All India Workers and Peasants Conference, to be held in Calcutta in December. The provincial WPPs attended All India Workers and Peasants Conference in Calcutta on 22–24 December 1928, at which the All India Workers and Peasants Party was formed. A 16-member national executive was elected. The Bengal, Bombay, Punjab and United Provinces were allocated four seats each in the national executive. Out of these 16, ten were either identified as CPI members or as 'communists'. R.S. Nimbkar was the general secretary of the party. The conference discussed an affiliation of the party with the League against Imperialism. Spratt and Ahmed urged the conference to approve the affiliation of the party to the League. The conference decision to postpone a decision on the issue to a later occasion.

== 1929 Bombay municipal election ==
The party contested the January 1929 Bombay municipal election, mustering around 12,500 votes.

== Comintern turns against the WPP ==
The political fortunes of the WPP was to be terminated by changes in policy of the Communist International. The July 1928 sixth congress of the Communist International declared that 'The Union of all communist groups and individuals scattered throughout the country into a single, illegal, independent and centralized party represent the first task for Indian communists.' This was a statement made in opposition to the building of the 'multi-class' WPP. The new line was promoted at the congress by the Finnish communist Otto Kuusinen. In his report, he stated that it was 'necessary to reject the formation of any kind of bloc between the Communist Party and the national-reformist opposition' in the colonies. Moreover, he claimed that parties like WPP could develop into petty bourgeois parties. Leon Trotsky concurred with this view. In June 1928, he had submitted a document which called WPP an invention of Joseph Stalin and that the party was a 'thoroughly anti-Marxist formation'. Abani Mukherji, a founding member of CPI, had described WPP as a 'Kuomintang Party' and that WPP 'is accumulating by itself the elements of future Indian Fascism.'. S.N. Tagore and the delegates of the Communist Party of Great Britain argued for retaining the WPP. This declaration created confusion amongst the communist ranks in India. On 2 December 1928, the Executive Committee of the Communist International had drafted a letter to the WPP, which singled out the WPP as consisting '...largely of petit-bourgeois intellectuals, and they were tied up with either the system of landlordism and usury or straight away capitalist interests.' The letter did however take long time to reach the WPP. The Tenth Plenum of the ECCI, 3–19 July 1929, directed the Indian communists to break with WPP. When the communists deserted it, the WPP fell apart.

== Meerut Conspiracy case ==
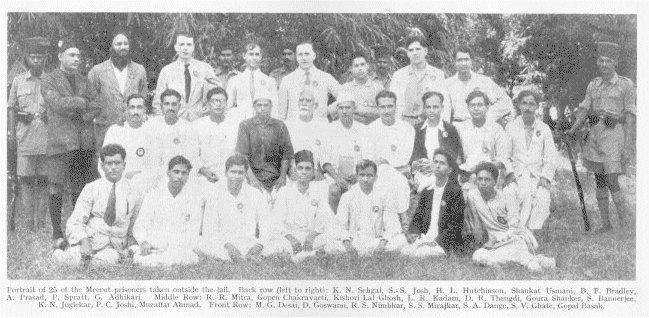
Portrait of 25 of Meerut Prisoners taken outside the jail. Backrow:(left to right) K.N. Sehgal, S.S. Josh, H.L. Hutchinson, Shaukat Usmani, B.F. Bradly, A. Prasad, P. Spratt, and G. Adhikari. Middle Row: K.R. Mitra, Gopan Chakravarthy, Kishore Lal Ghosh, K.L. Kadam, D.R. Thengdi, Goura Shanker, S. Banerjee, K.N. Joglekar, P.C. Joshi, and Muzaffar Ahmed. Front Row: M.G. Desai, G. Goswami, R.S. Nimkar, S.S. Mirajkar, S.A. Dange, G.V. Ghate and Gopal Basak.

On 20 March 1929, arrests of WPP, CPI and other labour leaders were made in several parts of India, in what became known as the Meerut Conspiracy Case. Most of the WPP leadership was now put behind bars. The trial proceedings were to last for four years, thus outliving the WPP. Tengdi, the WPP of Bombay president, died whilst the trial was still going on.

S.S. Mirajkar stated in his defense that:

It has already been pointed out to the Court that the Workers' and Peasants' Party was a party inaugurated with a view to establish national independence through revolution.

Abdul Majid on his behalf stated that:

If there is any resemblance between the Communist Party and the Workers' and Peasants' Party is that the immediate programme of the former and the ultimate programme of the latter is one and the same ... As both are revolutionary bodies it is necessary that their national revolutionary programme should resemble each other.

The judgement in the case was ended with the following passage:

As to the progress made in this conspiracy its main achievements have been the establishment of Workers and Peasant Parties in Bengal, Bombay and Punjab and the U.P., but perhaps of deeper gravity was the hold that the members of the Bombay Party acquired over the workers in the textile industry in Bombay as shown by the extent of the control which they exercised during the strike of 1928 and the success they were achieving in pushing forward a thoroughly revolutionary policy in the Girni Kamgar Union after the strike came to an end.

After the arrests of its main leaders, the WPP was dissolved.

== Policies ==
The founding manifesto of the Labour Swaraj Party stressed that the party was organised on the basis of class struggle, for the liberation of the masses. The party combined demand for full independence with socio-economic demands. In 1927, the WPP of Bombay presented a programme of action to the All India Congress Committee. The programme proposed struggle for full independence combined with active socio-economic policies for the toiling classes. The WPP of Bengal had submitted a manifesto the Madras Congress session, which sought that the Congress should engage in mass struggles for full independence and that a Constituent Assembly should determine the constitution of an independent India. The party also worked for the abolishment of 'zamindari' system in agriculture.

== Publications ==
The organ of the Labour Swaraj Party, and later the WPP of Bengal, was Langal ('Plough'). The chief editor of Langal was Kazi Nazrul Islam and the editor was Manibhusan Mukhopadhaya. Langal stopped publication after 15 issues. On 12 August 1926 it was substituted by Ganavani. In 1928, the party also had a weekly Hindi organ, Lal Nishan ('Red Flag'). A weekly newspaper in Kushtia, Jagaran ('Awakening'), was politically close to the party.

In Punjab the publication Kirti ('Worker') had been started in 1926 by Santokh Singh of the Ghadar Party. Soon it became the organ of the Punjab Kirti Kisan Party and managed by Sohan Singh Josh.

== Youth wing ==
The youth wing of the party was the Young Comrades League. P.C. Joshi played an important role in organising the youth league.

== See also ==
- Hindustan Socialist Republican Association
- Naujawan Bharat Sabha
- Revolutionary movement for Indian independence
- List of communist parties in India
