= K. N. Joglekar =

Indian Politician and one of the founding member of Communist Party of India

K. N. Joglekar (died November 1970) was an Indian politician and one of the founding members of Communist Party of India. He later joined All India Forward Bloc, of which he became the General Secretary from 1948 to 1952. Then he formed Forward Communist Party; in 1952 this party merged with the Communist Party of India.

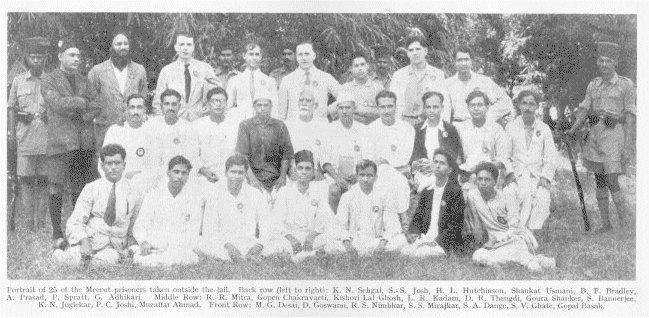
Portrait of 25 of the Meerut prisoners taken outside the jail. Back row (left to right): K. N. Sehgal, S. S. Josh, H. L. Hutchinson, Shaukat Usmani, B. F. Bradley, A. Prasad, P. Spratt, G. Adhikari. Middle row: R. R. Mitra, Gopen Chakravarti, Kishori Lal Ghosh, L. R. Kadam, D. R. Thengdi, Goura Shanker, S. Bannerjee, K. N. Joglekar, P. C. Joshi, Muzaffar Ahmad. Front row: M. G. Desai, D. Goswami, R. S. Nimbkar, S. S. Mirajkar, S. A. Dange, S. V. Ghate, Gopal Basak.

In 1929, he was jailed in the Meerut Conspiracy Case.

== Sources ==
1. Bose, K., Forward Bloc, Madras: Tamil Nadu Academy of Political Science, 1988.
