= All India Trade Union Congress =

Trade union in India

AITUC
- All India Trade Union Congress
- Founded: 31 October 1920 (106 years ago) at Bombay, Bombay Presidency, British India
- Headquarters: AITUC Bhavan, 35-36, DDU Marg, Rouse Avenue, New Delhi - 110002
- Location: India
- Members: 14.2 million (2013)
- Key people: Amarjeet Kaur (General Secretary); Ramendra Kumar (President); Binoy Viswam (Working President)
- Affiliations: WFTU
- Website: "aituc.net".

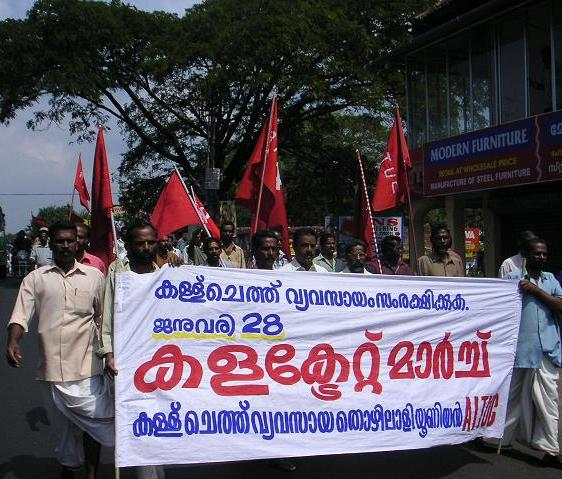
Collectorate March by Toddy Workers Body affiliated with AITUC at Alappuzha

The All India Trade Union Congress (AITUC) is the oldest trade union federation in India. It is associated with the Communist Party of India. According to provisional statistics from the Ministry of Labour, AITUC had 14.2 million members in 2013. It was founded on 31 October 1920 with Lala Lajpat Rai as its first president.

In Bombay by Lala Lajpat Rai, Joseph Baptista, N. M. Joshi, Diwan Chaman Lall and a few others and, until 1945 when unions became organised on party lines, it was the primary trade union organisation in India. Since then, it has been associated with the Communist Party of India.

AITUC is governed by a body headed by National President Ramendra Kumar and General Secretary Amarjeet Kaur, both politicians affiliated with Communist Party of India. "Trade Union Record" is the fortnightly journal of the AITUC.

AITUC is a founder member of the World Federation of Trade Unions. Today, its institutional records are part of the Archives at the Nehru Memorial Museum & Library, at Teen Murti House, Delhi.

== History ==
=== Background ===
The beginning of the labour upsurge against oppression and exploitation in India goes back to the second half of 19th century, with the emergence of class of casual general labour during British Raj. The self-sufficient Village economy was shattered with no new structures in place, creating impoverished peasantry and landless labour force.

The dumping of cheap industrial goods resulting in millions of artisans, spinners, weavers, craftsmen, smelters, smiths, potters, etc., who could no more live on agriculture also turned into landless labourers. This led to widespread famines in India through the period from 1850 to 1890 resulting in deaths of several lakhs and also reducing millions as beggars.

The anguish of impoverished masses, ruined peasantry was up in revolt which resulted in several movements even though crushed by the rulers. This background did help the 1857 revolt by princely states and the common masses against the disempowering policies of British rule.

Till this time trade unionism was not known to workers, they were reacting to extreme exploitative working conditions and very low wages. They formed themselves as 'jamaats' which were based more on social caste basis in order to fight the oppression and exploitation of their employers. This was the beginning of organization by the workers even though not the trade unions in essence.

From 1905 onwards there was notable advance in the working class actions and it was more and more closing its ranks with the advance of freedom struggle in the country.

A strike took place in Bombay against extension of working hours. The printing press workers in Calcutta also struck work. Another great event of the period was strike by industrial workers of Bombay from 24 to 28 July 1908, in protest against the pronouncement of judgment sentencing six years imprisonment to freedom fighter Bal Gangadhar Tilak. There were street fights between workers and police and military of British rulers.

Lenin wrote about this strike, "The Indian proletariat has already matured sufficiently to wage a mass struggle, class conscious and political, and that being the case, Anglo- Russian methods in India are played out".

This also needs mention here that the Factory Act established in 1881, was promulgated in the background of competition being provided to British Companies by goods produced in India due to availability of cheap labour and long working hours.

Even then it was only for the industry where competition to foreign industrial goods was posed. It was amended several times within a short period of few years. It was blessing in disguise as regards working hours and weekly holiday etc. but the wages and working conditions continued to be pathetic. In seasonal industry no changes were brought about as it did not impact the competitiveness to British Industry.

The October Revolution in 1917 in Russia during First World War was a great impetus for Indian labour movement as the working class along with peasantry captured power first time in the history of mankind.

In 1918 great strike in cotton mills of Bombay started and soon it spread to other areas with 1,25,000 workers participating by January 1919. The strike against Rowlatt Act had great impact on the national struggle itself. In the first half of 1920, there were 200 strikes involving 15 lakh workers. The demands were for 10 hrs working and dearness allowance. Out of 97 strikes during July to December 1920, only 31 ended in failure. In all other cases there were successes to some extent.

It was in this heroic background that the preparations began on 16 July 1920, when a convention was held in Bombay which decided "to hold All India Trade Union Congress in Bombay". A reception committee with 500 members with Joseph Baptista as chairperson was formed.

=== Formation ===
The founding conference began on 31 October 1920, in Empire Theatre Bombay with Lala Lajpat Rai as the founding President in which 101 delegates from 64 unions with a membership of 1,40,854 from all over India participated with presence of political leaders of various shades of opinions such as Motilal Nehru, M.A. Jinnah, Annie Besant, V.J. Patel, B.P. Wadia, N.M. Joshi, Joseph Baptista, Lalubhai Samaldas, Jamnadas, Dwarka Das, B W Wadia, R R Karandikar, Col. J.C. Wedgwood.

British Trade Union Congress attended as fraternal delegate. 43 other unions which could not join the conference expressed sympathy and full support. A few unions of government servants kept themselves aloof. The Ahmedabad Labour Association with six unions and 16,450 members right from the start functioned as separate organization under the patronage of employers.

Lala Lajpat Rai led a procession of 10,000 workers in the city of Bombay. Lala Lajpat Rai had declared "for the present, our greatest need is to organise, agitate and educate. We must organise our workers, make them class conscious and educate them in the ways and interest of the commonwealth". He also observed that labour "today had become an international factor and everyone's life all over the world had become interlinked. There would be no salvation until and unless the workers of Asia were organised and internationally affiliated".

In this first conference with Lala Lajpat Rai as president, Deewan Chaman Lal was the general secretary. Later on Pt. Jawahar Lal Nehru, Netaji Subhash Chandra Bose, V. V. Giri, Sarojini Naidu, C.R. Das and several of other political leaders of the freedom struggle were associated with subsequent conferences and work of AITUC giving impetus to the work.

AITUC in its second session in 1921 in Jharia had adopted a resolution of Swaraj (Complete independence from British rule), almost eight years before the Congress adopted such resolution in 1929.

In the aftermath of second World War the AITUC played significant role in the foundation of World Federation of Trade Unions (WFTU), in the conference held in London with 204 delegates and observers representing 670 million workers from all parts of the world. AITUC was represented by S.A. Dange, R.A. Khedgikar and Sudhindra Pramanik. This conference adopted workers charter.

== National Conferences ==
No.	Dates	Venue	General Secretary	President
1st	31 Oct 1920	Bombay	V.M. Pawar	Lala Lajpat Rai
2nd	30 Nov - 2 Dec 1921	Jharia	Diwan Chaman Lall	Joseph Baptista
3rd	24-26 March 1923	Lahore	Diwan Chaman Lall	Chittaranjan Das
4th	30-31 March 1924	Calcutta	F.J. Ginwala	D.R.Thengdi
4th	30-31 March 1924	Calcutta	E.N.C. Sen	D.R.Thengdi
5th	14-15 Feb 1925	Bombay	Narayan Malhar Joshi	Charles Freer Andrews
5th	14-15 Feb 1925	Bombay	F.J. Ginwala	Charles Freer Andrews
6th	9-10 Jan 1926	Madras	Narayan Malhar Joshi	Rai Sahib
6th	9-10 Jan 1926	Madras	Narayan Malhar Joshi	C. Prasad
7th	12-13 March 1927	Delhi	Narayan Malhar Joshi	Diwan Chaman Lall
8th	26-28 Nov 1927	Kanpur	Narayan Malhar Joshi	Charles Freer Andrews
9th	18-20 Dec 1928	Jharia	Narayan Malhar Joshi	Jawaharlal Nehru
10th	28 Nov-1 Dec 1929	Nagpur	S.V. Deshpande	Subhas Chandra Bose
11th	4-7 July 1931	Calcutta	Mukundlal Sircar	Ramchandra Sakharam Ruikar
12th	10-12 Sept, 1932	Madras	Mukundlal Sircar	G.L. Khandelkar
13th	23-24 Dec 1933	Kanpur	Sibnath Banerjee	Hariharnath Shastri
14th	19-21 Apr 1935	Calcutta	R.A. Khedgikar	Ramchandra Sakharam Ruikar
15th	17-18 May 1936	Bombay	Maniben Kara	Sibnath Banerjee
16th	1-7 Jan 1938	Delhi	Bankim Kr. Mukherjee	Suresh Chandra Banerjee
17th	17 Apr 1938	Nagpur	B.R. Bakhale	Suresh Chandra Banerjee
18th	28-30 Sept 1940	Bombay	Narayan Malhar Joshi	V.R. Kalappa
19th	8-9 Feb 1942	Kanpur	Narayan Malhar Joshi	V. V. Giri
20th	1-4 May 1943	Nagpur	Narayan Malhar Joshi	Shripad Amrit Dange
21st	18-23 Jan 1945	Madras	Narayan Malhar Joshi	Mrinal Kanti Bose
22nd	13-19 Feb 1947	Calcutta	Narayan Malhar Joshi	Shripad Amrit Dange
23rd	27-30 May 1949	Bombay	Narayan Malhar Joshi	Shripad Amrit Dange
24th	27-30 May 1954	Calcutta	Shripad Amrit Dange	Vengal Chakkarai Chettiar
25th	25-29 Dec 1957	Ernakulam	Shripad Amrit Dange	Santaram Savlaram Mirajkar
26th	6-12 Jan 1961	Coimbatore	Shripad Amrit Dange	Santaram Savlaram Mirajkar
27th	16-22 May 1966	Bombay	Shripad Amrit Dange	Santaram Savlaram Mirajkar
28th	28 Jan-1 Feb 1970	Guntur	Shripad Amrit Dange	Santaram Savlaram Mirajkar
29th	30 Jan-4 Feb 1973	Calcutta	Shripad Amrit Dange	Ranen Sen
30th	13-17 Oct 1976	Jamshedpur	K.G. Srivastava	Shripad Amrit Dange
31st	26-31 Oct 1980	Visakhapatnam	Indrajit Gupta	Shripad Amrit Dange
32nd	15-20 Dec 1983	Bangalore	Indrajit Gupta	Chaturanan Mishra
33rd	15-20 Dec 1986	Vadodara	Indrajit Gupta	Chaturanan Mishra
34th	7-12 Aug 1990	Madras	Homi Framroze Daji	M. S. Krishnan
35th	11-15 March 1994	Patna	Ardhendu Bhusan Bardhan	M. S. Krishnan
36th	16-20 Oct 1997	Amritsar	K. L. Mahendra	J. Chitharanjan
37th	19-23 Dec 2001	Hyderabad	Gurudas Dasgupta	J. Chitharanjan
38th	26-30 Nov 2005	Delhi	Gurudas Dasgupta	Promode Gogoi
39th	29 Nov-5 Dec 2008	Thiruvananthapuram	Gurudas Dasgupta	Promode Gogoi
40th	27-30 Nov 2012	Mumbai	Gurudas Dasgupta	Ramendra Kumar
41st	25-28 Feb 2016	Coimbatore	Gurudas Dasgupta	Ramendra Kumar
^{mid}	11 Dec 2017	Ranchi	Amarjeet Kaur	Ramendra Kumar
42nd	16-20 Dec 2022	Alappuzha	Amarjeet Kaur	Ramendra Kumar

== Affiliates ==
partial list:

- Andhra Pradesh Auto Rickshaw Drivers and Workers Federation
- All India Bank Employees Association
- A.P. Mica Mine Workers Union
- Calcutta Hawkers' Men Union
- All India Defence Employees Federation
- Federation of Chatkal Mazdoor Unions
- Nikhila Orissa Beedi Shramika Federation
- Patiala Aviation Club Workers Union: for those working at Patiala Airport
- Pondicherry Textile Labour Union
- Powerloom Workers Union
- Punjab Breweries Workers Union
- Vegetable Market Workers Union
- Visakha Steel Workers Union
- National Fuel Labour Union
- IT and Allied Employees Confederation
- National Federation of Indian Road Transport Workers
- All India ASHA Workers Federation
- All India fish workers Federation
- Indian Mine Worker Federation
- Colliery Mazdoor Sabha

== See also ==
- Indian Trade Unions
- Kedar Das Institute for Labour and Social Studies
