= Narayan Malhar Joshi =

Indian trade unionist (1879–1955)

- Born: 5 June 1879; Goregaon, Colaba District now Raigad Maharashtra, India
- Died: 30 May 1955 (aged 75); Bombay, Bombay State, India
- Occupations: Politician, freedom fighter, Social activist
- Movement: Trade Union Movement

Narayan Malhar Joshi (5 June 1879 – 30 May 1955) was an Indian trade union leader and follower of Gopal Krishna Gokhale. Joshi became involved in labour issues and started the All India Trade Union Congress in 1920 along with Lala Lajpat Rai. He was the general secretary of AITUC from 1925 to 1929 and from 1940 to 1948. In 1931, he left AITUC and started the All India Trade Union Federation.

In 1911, Joshi established an organization called the Social Service League. The League conducted training programmes for volunteers, whose services were later utilized for relief work among people suffering from famines, epidemics, floods and other disasters, and also for welfare programmes among the poor and the destitute. He was president of Bombay Textile Labor Union. Among other titles, he is considered one of the pioneers in Modern Indian Social Work. On 20 September 1922, N M Joshi established an organization called the Sahakari Manoranjan Mandal. The 'sahakari' conducted training programmes for theatre artists, which later on successfully ran various Sangeet Natak plays written and directed by mill workers.

== Early life ==
Narayan Malhar Joshi was born into Deshastha Brahmin family on 5 June 1879 at Goregaon, Kolaba (Raigad) district, Maharashtra. Joshi attended the New English School and Deccan College, graduating in 1901. He became a high school teacher after graduating, and later joined the Servants of India Society in 1909. In 1911, he moved to Bombay to found the Social Service League.

== See also ==
- Trade unions in India
- All India Trade Union Congress
