= Communism in India =

Communism in India has existed as both a social and a political ideology, as well as a political movement since the 1920s. In its early years, communist ideology was harshly suppressed through legal prohibitions and criminal prosecutions. Eventually, communist parties became ensconced in national party politics, sprouting several political offshoots.

Indian Communist Party flag (1987)

== Early history of communism in India ==
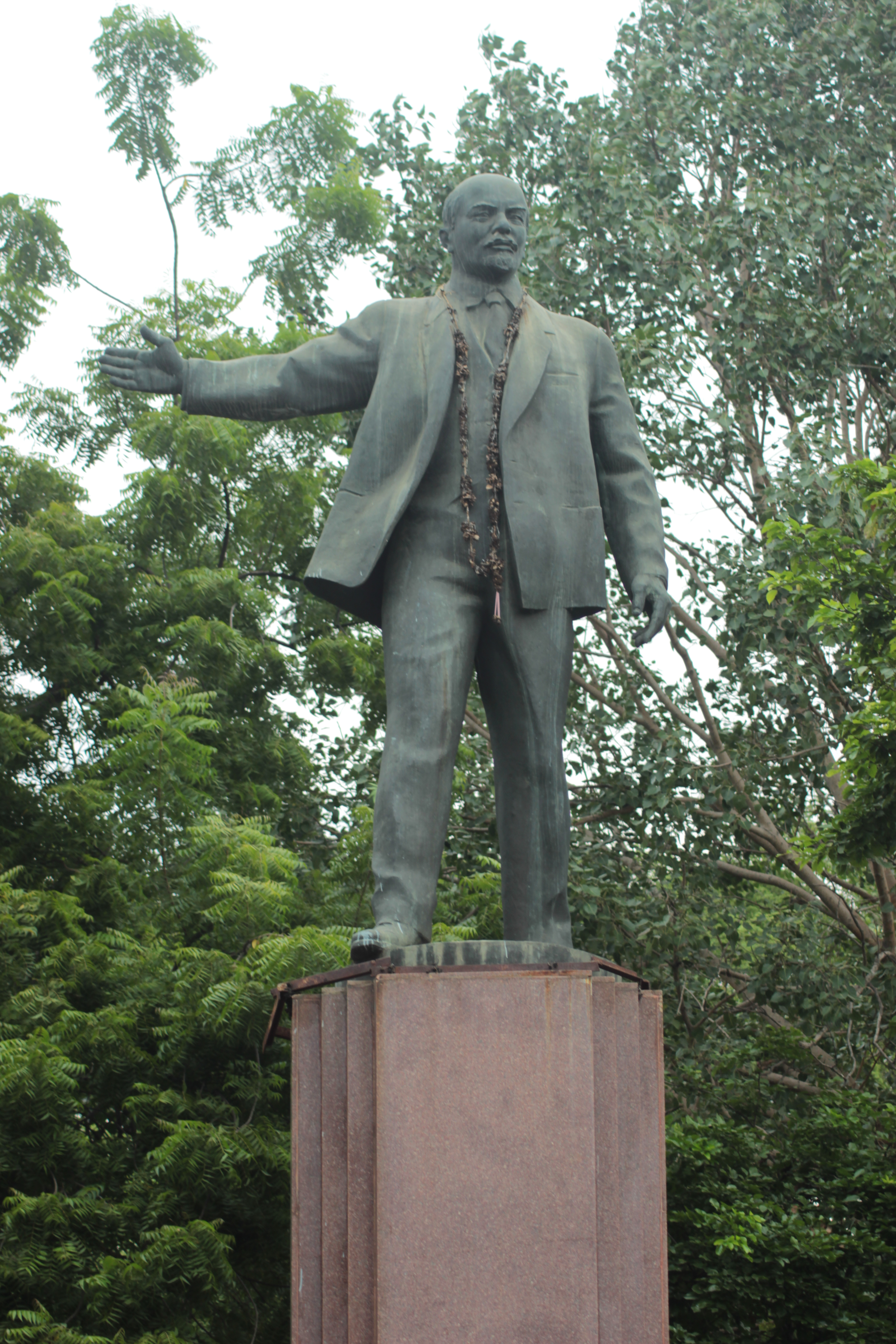
The statue of Vladimir Lenin in Vijayawada

Following the October Revolution, Bipin Chandra Pal and Bal Gangadhar Tilak were amongst the prominent Indians who expressed their admiration of Lenin and the new rulers in the USSR, now Russia. Abdul Sattar Khairi and Abdul Zabbar Khairi went to Moscow, immediately on hearing about the revolution. In Moscow, they met Lenin and conveyed their greetings to him. The Russian Revolution also affected émigré Indian revolutionaries, such as the Ghadar Party in North America. The Khilafat movement contributed to the emergence of early Indian communism. Many Indian Muslims left India to join the defence of the Caliphate. Several of them became communists whilst visiting Soviet territory. Some Hindus also joined the Muslim muhajirs in their travels to the Soviet areas. The colonial authorities were clearly disturbed by the growing influence of Bolshevik sympathies in India. A first counter-move was the issuing of a fatwa, urging Muslims to reject communism. The Home Department established a special branch to monitor the communist influence. Customs were ordered to check the imports of Marxist literature to India. A great number of anti-communist propaganda publications were published.

The First World War was accompanied by a rapid increase in industry in India, resulting in the growth of an industrial proletariat. At the same time prices of essential commodities increased. These were factors that contributed to the buildup of the Indian trade union movement. Unions were formed in the urban centres across India, and strikes were organised. In 1920, the All India Trade Union Congress was founded. S. A. Dange of Bombay published a pamphlet in 1921 titled Gandhi Vs. Lenin, a comparative study of the approaches of both the leaders with Lenin coming out as the better of the two. Together with Ranchoddas Bhavan Lotvala, a local mill-owner, a library of Marxist Literature was set up and the publishing of translations of Marxist classics began. In 1922, with Lotvala's help, Dange launched the English weekly, Socialist, the first Indian Marxist journal.

The 1924 Second Congress of the Communist International insisted that a united front should be formed between the proletariat, peasantry and national bourgeoisie in colonised countries. Among the twenty-one conditions drafted by Lenin ahead of the congress was the 11th thesis, which stipulated that all communist parties must support the bourgeois-democratic liberation movements in the colonies. Some of the delegates opposed the idea of alliance with the bourgeoisie, and preferred support for communist movements of these countries instead. Their criticism was shared by the Indian revolutionary M.N. Roy, who attended as a delegate of the Communist Party of Mexico. The congress removed the term 'bourgeois-democratic' in what became the 8th condition.

During the 1920s and the early 1930s, the Communist Party existed but was badly organised, and in practice, there were several communist groups working with limited national coordination. The British colonial authorities had banned all communist activity, which made the task of building a united party very difficult. A Communist Group was founded in Tashkent on 17 October 1920, soon after the Second Congress of the Communist International by M.N. Roy. Roy made contact with the Anushilan and Jugantar groups in Bengal. Small communist groups were formed in Bombay (led by S.A. Dange), Madras (led by Singaravelu Chettiar), United Provinces (led by Shaukat Usmani), Punjab, Sindh (led by Ghulam Hussain) and Bengal (led by Muzaffar Ahmed).

On 1 May 1923 the Labour Kisan Party of Hindustan was founded in Madras by Singaravelu Chettiar. The LKPH organised the first May Day celebration in India, and this was also the first time the red flag was used in India.

On 26 December 1925, the Communist Party of India was formed at the first Party Conference in Kanpur, then Cawnpore. S.V. Ghate was the first General Secretary of CPI. The conference was held on 1925 December 25 to 28. Colonial authorities estimated that 500 persons took part in the conference. The conference was convened by a man called Satyabhakta, of whom little is known. Satyabhakta is said to have argued for a 'national communism' and against subordination under the Comintern. Being outvoted by the other delegates, Satyabhakta left both the conference venue in protest. The conference adopted the name 'Communist Party of India'. Groups such as LKPH dissolved into the CPI. The émigré CPI, which probably had little organic character, was substituted by the organisation now operating inside India.

Until the 1940s, communist works in India were primarily those of Western and Soviet Marxist thinkers. Texts of Chinese communists were less circulated in India, in large part because Mao's works were generally available in English but not Bengali or Telugu. Chinese texts of particular interest to Indian communists included On Contradiction, On New Democracy, and Liu Shaoqi's How to be a Good Communist.

== Participation in Indian independence movement ==
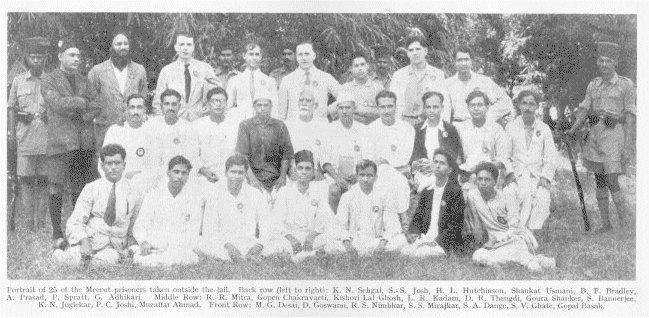
Portrait of 25 of the Meerut Prisoners taken outside the jail. Back row (left to right): K. N. Sehgal, S. S. Josh, H. L. Hutchinson, Shaukat Usmani, B. F. Bradley, A. Prasad, P. Spratt, G. Adhikari. Middle Row: Radharaman Mitra, Gopen Chakravarti, Kishori Lal Ghosh, L. R. Kadam, D. R. Thengdi, Goura Shanker, S. Bannerjee, K.N. Joglekar, P. C. Joshi, Muzaffar Ahmed. Front Row: M. G. Desai, D. Goswami, R.S. Nimbkar, S.S. Mirajkar, S.A. Dange, S.V. Ghate, Gopal Basak.

Between 1921 and 1924 there were three conspiracy trials against the communist movement: the First Peshawar Conspiracy Case, the Meerut Conspiracy Case and the Kanpur Bolshevik Conspiracy Case. In the first three cases, Russian-trained muhajir communists were put on trial. However, the Cawnpore trial had more political impact. On 17 March 1923, Shripad Amrit Dange, M.N. Roy, Muzaffar Ahmed, Nalini Gupta, Shaukat Usmani, Singaravelu Chettiar, Ghulam Hussain and R.C. Sharma were charged in the Cawnpore (now spelt Kanpur) Bolshevik Conspiracy case. The specific pip charge was that they, as communists, were seeking "to deprive the King Emperor of his sovereignty of British India, by complete separation of India from Britain by a violent revolution." Pages of newspapers daily splashed sensational communist plans and people for the first time learned, on such a large scale, about communism and its doctrines and the aims of the Communist International in India.

== Involvement in Indian politics ==
=== Communist political parties ===
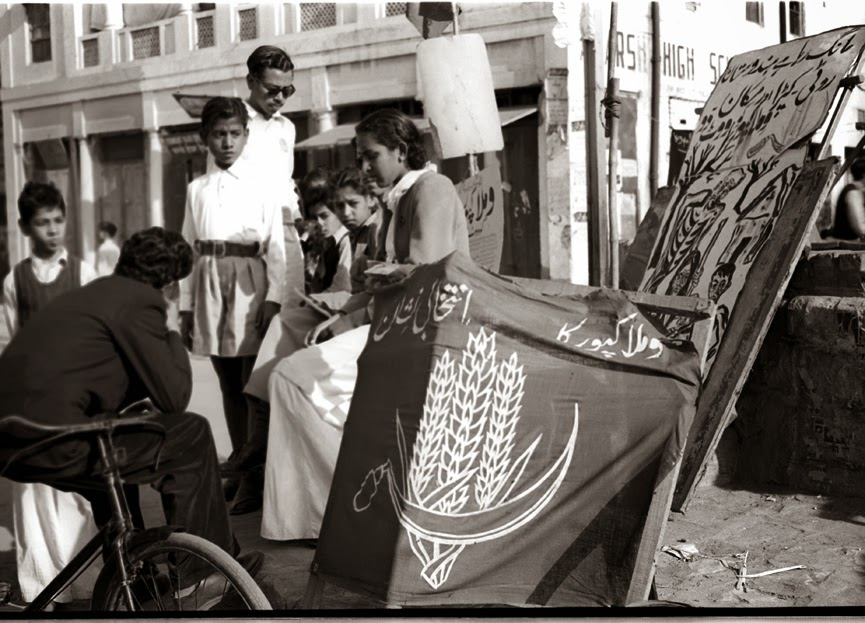
CPI election campaign in Karol Bagh, Delhi, for the 1952 Indian general election

As of 2022, the Communist Party of India (Marxist) (abbreviated CPIM) is the largest communist party in India. The party emerged from a split from the Communist Party of India in 1964. The CPI(M) was formed at the Seventh Congress of the Communist Party of India (Marxist) held in Kolkata (formerly Calcutta) from 31 October to 7 November 1964. Land reform movement in India led by CPI(M) leaders Benoy Choudhury and Hare Krishna Konar which threatened the interests of the landowning middle/backward castes that supported the Communist Party of India (Marxist). CPIM has elected leaders in 7 state legislative assemblies including Kerala, Tripura, Bihar, Maharashtra, Jammu and Kashmir, Odisha and Tamil Nadu along with members in the Indian Parliament. It also leads the West Bengal Left Front. As of 2016, CPI(M) claimed to have 1,048,678 members. It is one of the eight National Parties of India. The highest body of the party is the Politburo. There are a large number of smaller Marxist parties, including the Communist Party of India (Marxist-Leninist), Marxist Communist Party of India, Marxist Coordination Committee in Jharkhand, Forward Bloc in Bengal, Janathipathiya Samrakshana Samithy, Communist Marxist Party and BTR-EMS-AKG Janakeeya Vedi in Kerala, Mazdoor Mukti (Workers' Emancipation) and Party of Democratic Socialism in West Bengal, Janganotantrik Morcha in Tripura, the Ram Pasla group in Punjab, and the Orissa Communist Party in Orissa.

CPI(M) in Tamil Nadu

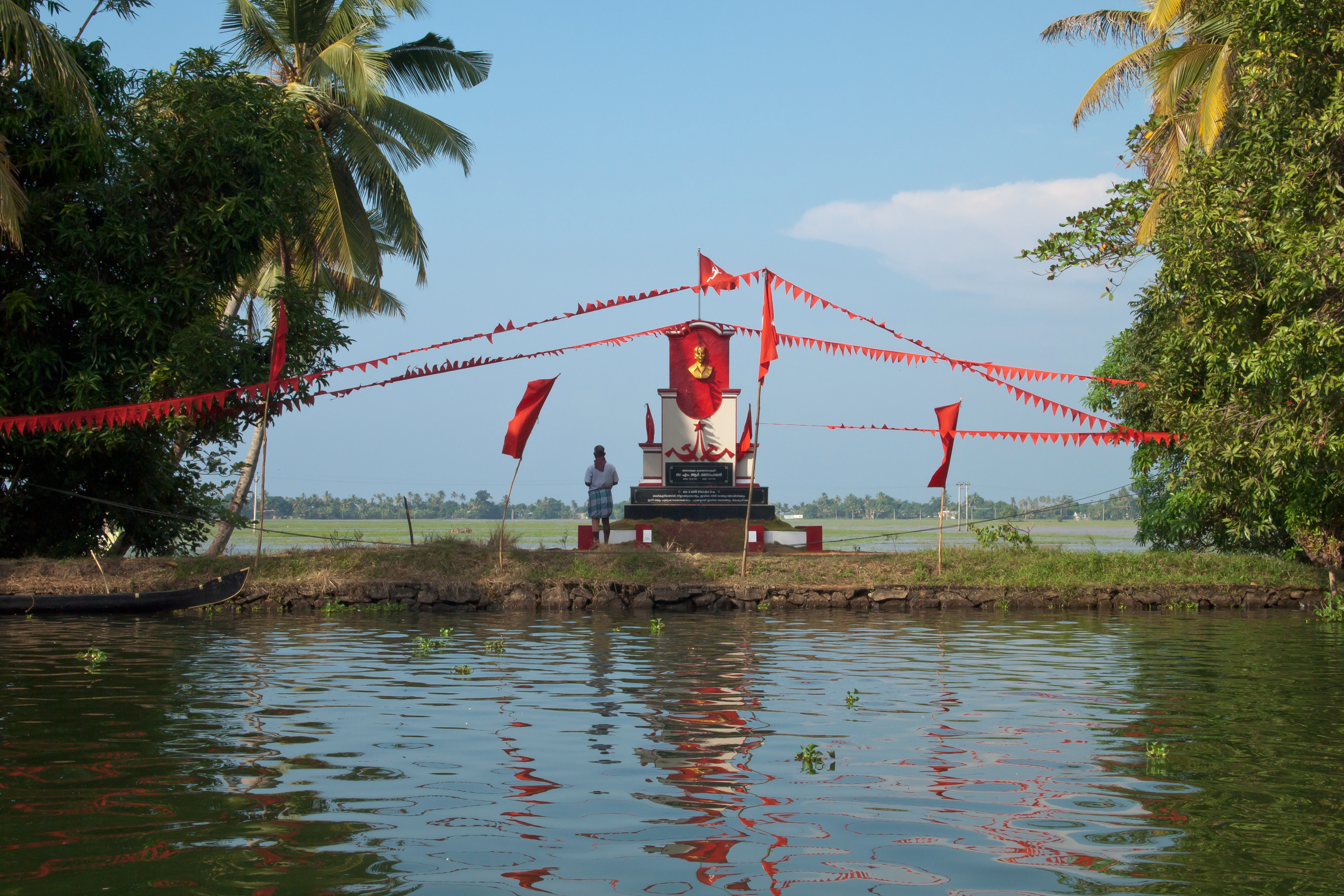
Communist monument in Kerala

The Communist Party of India (Maoist) is a Maoist communist party in India which aims to overthrow the government of India through people's war. It was founded on 21 September 2004, through the merger of the Communist Party of India (Marxist–Leninist) People's War (People's War Group), and the Maoist Communist Centre of India (MCCI). The merger was announced on 14 October the same year. In the merger, a provisional central committee was constituted, with the erstwhile People's War Group leader Muppala Lakshmana Rao, alias "Ganapathi", as general secretary. Further, on May Day 2014, the Communist Party of India (Marxist–Leninist) Naxalbari merged into the CPI (Maoist). The CPI (Maoist) is often referred to as the intellectuals in reference to the Naxalbari insurrection conducted by radical Maoists in West Bengal in 1967. CPI (Maoist) is designated as a terrorist organisation in India under Unlawful Activities (Prevention) Act.

=== Presence in states and politics ===
Left parties' regional control: State which had chief ministers from both the CPI(M) and the CPI. State/s which had a chief ministers from the CPI(M). States which have Governments of coalition of parties including Left parties like CPI(M), CPI, CPI(ML)L and AIFB. States which did not have/had a chief minister from the CPI(M) or the CPI.

As of 2026 The Left Front under CPI(M) governed West Bengal for an uninterrupted 34 years (1977–2011), Tripura for 30 years including an uninterrupted 25 years (1993–2018) and Kerala for 26 years including an uninterrupted 10 years (2016–2026). The 34 years of the Left Front rule in West Bengal is the longest-serving democratically elected communist-led government in the world. The Left Front's highest tally nationally was in 2004 when it got about 8% of votes polled in and it had 59 MPs. It played the role of kingmaker for the Third Front governments during 1996–98 by joining a 13-party coalition and for the Congress-led United Progressive Alliance government in 2004.

The Left Front, also known as the Left Democratic Front, is an alliance of left-wing political parties in the Indian states. But the presence of this alliance is mainly in Kerala, Tripura and West Bengal. In Lok Sabha elections, only CPI(M) and CPI participate election together nationally while other Left parties ally with CPIM and CPI regionally.

Former CPIM General Secretary Sitaram Yechury said that his party will ally with Rashtriya Janata Dal in Bihar and Samajwadi Party in Uttar Pradesh. CPIM Polit Bureau member and Chief Minister of Kerala Pinarayi Vijayan confirmed about CPIM's plan of forming state-level alliances and hinted an alliance with Bharat Rashtra Samithi in Telangana.

==== Kerala ====
Kerala is considered as the Communist Fort of India. Kerala has a strong presence of CPIM and left parties in its politics and society. The Left Democratic Front has 11 member parties including CPI(M), CPI, KC(M), JD(S), NCP, RJD, KC(B), INL, C(S), JKC and KC(ST). Currently, LDF has 35 MLAs, 1 Lok Sabha MP and 7 Rajya Sabha MPs in the state.

==== Tripura ====
The Left Front (composed of CPIM, CPI, RSP and AIFB) is the main opposition in the Tripura Legislative Assembly. As of 2023, Left Front is composed of CPIM, CPI, RSP and AIFB and CPI(ML)L and it declared Democratic Secular Alliance with the Indian National Congress in the 2023 Tripura Legislative Assembly election.

==== West Bengal ====
The Left Front (Bengali: বামফ্রন্ট; baamfront) was formed in January 1977, the founding parties being the Communist Party of India (Marxist), All India Forward Bloc, the Revolutionary Socialist Party, the Marxist Forward Bloc, the Revolutionary Communist Party of India and the Biplabi Bangla Congress. Other parties joined in later years, most notably the Communist Party of India. The Left Front government ruled West Bengal for 34 years from 1977 to 2011. The Left Front allied with the Indian National Congress in 2016, 2021 and with the Indian Secular Front in 2021. After the 2018 Panchayat polls, BJP became the main opposition in the state, pushing the Left Front into the third position. In the 2019 Lok Sabha election, the front was unable to secure a seat. In 2021, the Left Front suffered a huge setback as the alliance drew blank seats for the first time in the Legislative Assembly election.

==== Bihar ====
The communist parties in Bihar had historically held a large presence in the state that was reduced following the Mandal Commission in 1979. The Left parties had 25-35 MLAs in the Bihar assembly, with the CPI winning 20-25 seats in every election, even until 1995. But Left Front won a few seats in the next elections in the state. On 24 July 2015, the Communist Party of India, the Communist Party of India (Marxist), the Communist Party of India (Marxist-Leninist) Liberation, the All India Forward Bloc, the Socialist Unity Centre of India (Communist) and the Revolutionary Socialist Party decided to run in all constituencies on a join ticket citing its call for an alternative platform in 2015 Bihar Legislative Assembly election. The CPI contested 98 seats, while the CPI-ML, CPI(M), SUCI, Forward Bloc, and RSP contested 98, 43, 10, 9, and 3 seats, respectively. CPI released its first list of 81 candidates on 16 September 2015. The Left parties together got 3.57% of the votes polled in the election. Before 2020 Bihar Legislative Assembly election, the Mahagathbandhan alliance was joined in by the left–wing parties in Bihar; namely the Communist Party of India (Marxist–Leninist) Liberation, the Communist Party of India and the Communist Party of India (Marxist). The new arrangement was described as an experiment beyond the caste-based politics in Bihar with a caste plus class strategy. The Left parties contested 29 seats (CPIML Liberation - 19 seats, CPI - 6 seats and CPIM - 4 seats). CPI(ML) Liberation won 12 seats while CPI and CPIM won 2 seats each. It is also speculated that if more seats were given to the left parties, the election could be won with a majority. The Left parties supported JD(U), RJD and INC to form a coalition government in Bihar in August 2022 without taking part in the government. In 2025 Bihar Legislative Assembly election, the Left Front suffered a huge setback when the CPI(ML) won only 2 seats and secured just 2.84% of the total votes counted. CPI won 1 and CPI(M) failed to win any seat.

==== Tamil Nadu ====
In 2006 Tamil Nadu Legislative Assembly election, CPI and CPIM fought in alliance with DMK and won 6 and 9 seats respectively. The Left parties contested the next election in coalition with AIADMK (CPI - 10 seats, CPIM - 12 seats and AIFB - 1 seat) and won 20 seats (CPI - 9 seats, CPIM - 10 seats and AIFB - 1 seat). In 2016, CPI and CPIM joined Makkal Nala Kootani (People's Welfare Alliance) and contested 25 seats each, but drew blank seats. In 2019, 4 MPs were elected (CPI - 2, CPIM - 2) from the Left Front in coalition with DMK. In the 2021 election, CPI and CPIM won 2 seats each. In the 2022 Municipal Corporation elections, CPIM won 24 Municipal Corporations, 41 Municipality and 101 Town Panchayats while CPI won 13 Municipal Corporations, 19 Municipality and 26 Town Panchayats. T. Nagarajan of CPI(M) got the post of Deputy Mayor in Madurai Municipal Corporation.

==== Rajasthan ====
In the 2008 Rajasthan Legislative Assembly election, CPIM secured 3 seats from Anupgarh, Dhod and Danta Ramgarh. CPIM along with six other parties including CPI, CPI(ML)L, MCPI(U), SP, RLD and JD(S) formed Rajasthan Loktantrik Morcha in 2013. Amra Ram of CPIM became the chief ministerial candidate. But the alliance could not win any seat in the 2013 Legislative Assembly election. In 2018, 2 MLAs of CPIM and 1 MLA of RLD were elected. But the front could not win any seat in the 2023 Legislative Assembly election. In the 2024 Lok Sabha elections, CPI(M) won the Sikar Lok Sabha Constituency.

==== Himachal Pradesh ====
The presence of left parties in Himachal Pradesh is mainly based on the activities of their student wings. CPIM had representatives in the Himachal Pradesh Legislative Assembly in 1967 and 1993. In 1993, Rakesh Singha won from the Shimla seat. Though CPIM managed to win many seats in the municipal and panchayat elections.

In the 2012 Shimla Municipal Corporation election, CPI(M) won the posts of Mayor and Deputy Mayor in Shimla Municipal Corporation with a huge majority with a total of 3 seats. Sanjay Chauhan and Tikender Singh Panwar became Mayor and Deputy Mayor, respectively.

In 2016, CPIM won 42 seats out of 331 seats contested and received solely 2 district panchayats. In the 2017 Shimla Municipal Corporation election, CPI(M) managed to win only one seat despite being a kingmaker in the previous election.

The Left Front contested 17 seats in the 2017 Himachal Pradesh Legislative Assembly election (CPIM - 14 seats, CPI - 3 seats). Rakesh Singha of CPIM emerged victorious from Theog. After the election, the presence of the Left in the state started to increase.

In the 2021 panchayat elections, CPIM increased its tally by jumping to 337 seats. 12 zila parishad (ZP) members, 25 panchayat samiti members, 28 panchayat pradhans, 30 vice-pradhans and 242 ward members got elected from CPIM. Also, CPIM candidates got elected for president in 25 panchayats and vice-president in 30 panchayats.

In 2022, the Left Front fielded 12 candidates: 11 from CPI(M) and 1 from CPI. But the front drew blank seat securing only 28,444 votes (0.67%).

==== Maharashtra ====
The presence of Left parties in Maharashtra is for the strong presence of their farmer wings in the state. In the 2009 Maharashtra Legislative Assembly election, Peasants and Workers Party of India won 4 seats (1.11% votes) and CPIM won 1 seat (0.60% votes). In 2019, Vinod Nikole of CPIM won from Dahanu constituency. In the 2022 Panchayat election, CPI(M) won 93 Sarpanch (Village President) posts in direct elections, with the entire village voting, in the districts of Nashik (59) Thane-Palghar (26), Ahmednagar (6), Nandurbar (1) and Pune (1). Along with that, ward wise elections of Gram Panchayat Members were also held. The CPI(M) won hundreds of these seats, and has a majority in over 100 Gram Panchayats in the above districts.

==== Andhra Pradesh ====
In the 1994 Andhra Pradesh Legislative Assembly election, 34 MLAs (CPI - 19, CPIM - 15), in 2004 15 MLAs (CPI - 6, CPIM - 9) of the Left Front were elected. In 2014, CPI and CPIM won 1 seat each, which subsequently went to the Telangana state. In 2019, the Left parties contested the election in alliance with the Jana Sena Party. But they did not win any seats. In 1984, CPIM and CPI won 1 seat each. The Left Front came victorious many times in local body elections.

CPIM had MPs in the Rajya Sabha elected from Andhra Pradesh. Moturu Hanumantha Rao from 1988 to 1994, Y. Radhakrishna Murthy from 1996 to 2002 and Penumalli Madhu from 2004 to 2010.

==== Telangana ====
In the 2018 Telangana Legislative Assembly election, CPIM and CPI did not win any seats. In 2022 Munugode by-election, Left parties supported the candidate fielded by Bharat Rashtra Samithi. In 2023, CPIM and CPI will contest the election in alliance with BRS. On 10 December 2022, CPIM leader Tammineni Veerabhadram said that his party is willing to contest 9 seats in the 2023 election.

=== Leading the Third Front ===
The CPI(M) led the formation of the Third Front for the 2009 election. This front was basically a collection of regional political parties that were neither in the UPA nor in the NDA. Parties like CPIM, CPI, AIFB, RSP, BSP, AIADMK, MDMK, BJD, JD(S), HJC, TDP were the members of this front. The newly formed alliance carried with them 109 seats before the 2009 election. After the election, the alliance won only 79 seats.

== Communist insurgency ==
The Naxalite–Maoist insurgency is an ongoing conflict that refers to the underground activities and insurgency by Maoist groups (known as Naxalites or Naxals) like the Communist Party of India (Maoist). The Maoist parties have been designated as a terrorist organisation in India under the Unlawful Activities (Prevention) Act since 2009. The naxalites affected areas are called the Red corridor, which has been steadily declining in terms of geographical coverage and number of violent incidents, and in 2021, it was claimed to be confined to the 25 "most affected" locations (accounting for 85% of LWE violence) and 70 "total affected" districts (down from 180 in 2009) across 10 states in two coal-rich, remote, forested hilly clusters in and around the Dandakaranya-Chhattisgarh-Odisha region and the tri-junction area of Jharkhand-Bihar and-West Bengal. However, some parts of the Red Corridor have also seen the growth of Maoist insurgency in recent times, such as in the Kanha Tiger Reserve. The Naxalites have frequently fought with the police and the governmental army in what they say is a fight for improved land rights and more jobs for neglected agricultural labourers and the poor.

== See also ==
- Anarchism in India
- Communist movements in India
- Communism in Kerala
- Socialism in India
- Naxalite
- Anti-communism in India
- Communist involvement in the Indian independence movement
- China–India relations
- Sino-Indian War
- List of communist parties in India
