= Foundation of the Communist Party of India =

Controversy over the political party's founding date

Red flag used by the Communist Party of India as well as other contemporary Indian communist organisations

The Communist Party of India is one of the oldest political parties in India. However within the Indian communist movement, there is a controversy on what date to consider as the foundation date of the party. The early history of the Indian communist movement was tumultuous and complicated. An Indian communist group emerged in Tashkent in 1920, led by M. N. Roy. From 1921 onward small local communist groups began to emerge inside India. A national communist conference was held in Kanpur in 1925. The efforts to build a Communist Party organization inside India were hampered by arrests and court cases against leading party members.

Following the party split in 1964 the two main entities of the Indian communist movement, the Communist Party of India (Marxist) (CPI(M)) and the contemporary CPI would interpret the early party history differently. The CPI(M) maintains the party was founded in Tashkent in October 1920 whilst CPI argues that the party was founded in Kanpur in December 1925.

== Background ==
There were some influences of Marxism in the Indian national revolutionary movement prior to the 1917 October Revolution. The émigré revolutionary Lala Har Dayal wrote a biography on Karl Marx in March 1912. Swadeshabhimani Ramakrishna Pillai wrote a biography on Marx in Malayalam language. However, there doesn't appear to have existed any organized communist activity in India before 1921.

At the onset of World War I a sector of militant nationalists was pinning their hopes that a British defeat in the war would pave the path for Indian independence. However as the United Kingdom emerged as one of the victorious powers in the World War, this sector revised their position that independence would be achieved by external assistance. Among the militant nationalists there was also an increased rejection of sporadic terrorism. On 7 May 1919 a meeting between Lenin and a number of Indian revolutionaries was held. Attendants included Raja Mahendra Pratap (the President of the Provisional Government of India set up with German support in Kabul in 1915), Mohamed Barakatullah Bhopali (the Prime Minister of said Provisional Government), Abdul Rab and M. P. T. Acharya. Acharya would later take part in the formation of the émigré communist organization in Tashkent in October 1920. The left-wing nationalists Raja Mahendra Pratap and Mohamed Barakatullah Bhopal would not join the Tashkent communist organization, but remained friendly with the group.

Between January and April 1920 a small number of radical Indian nationalists shifted to Tashkent in Soviet Turkestan. On 17 April 1920 an Indian Communist Section of Sovinterprop was formed in Tashkent, among its seven members were Abdul Majid, Abdul Fazil, Mohammad Shafiq and Mohammad Ali (the latter two being sent to Tashkent by the Provisional Government of India). The Indian Sovinterprop section produced a single-issue Urdu publication called Zamindar and the pamphlets Bolshevism and the Islamic Nations (authored by M. Barkatullah) and What Soviet Power is Like. It issued an appeal titled To the Indian Brothers.

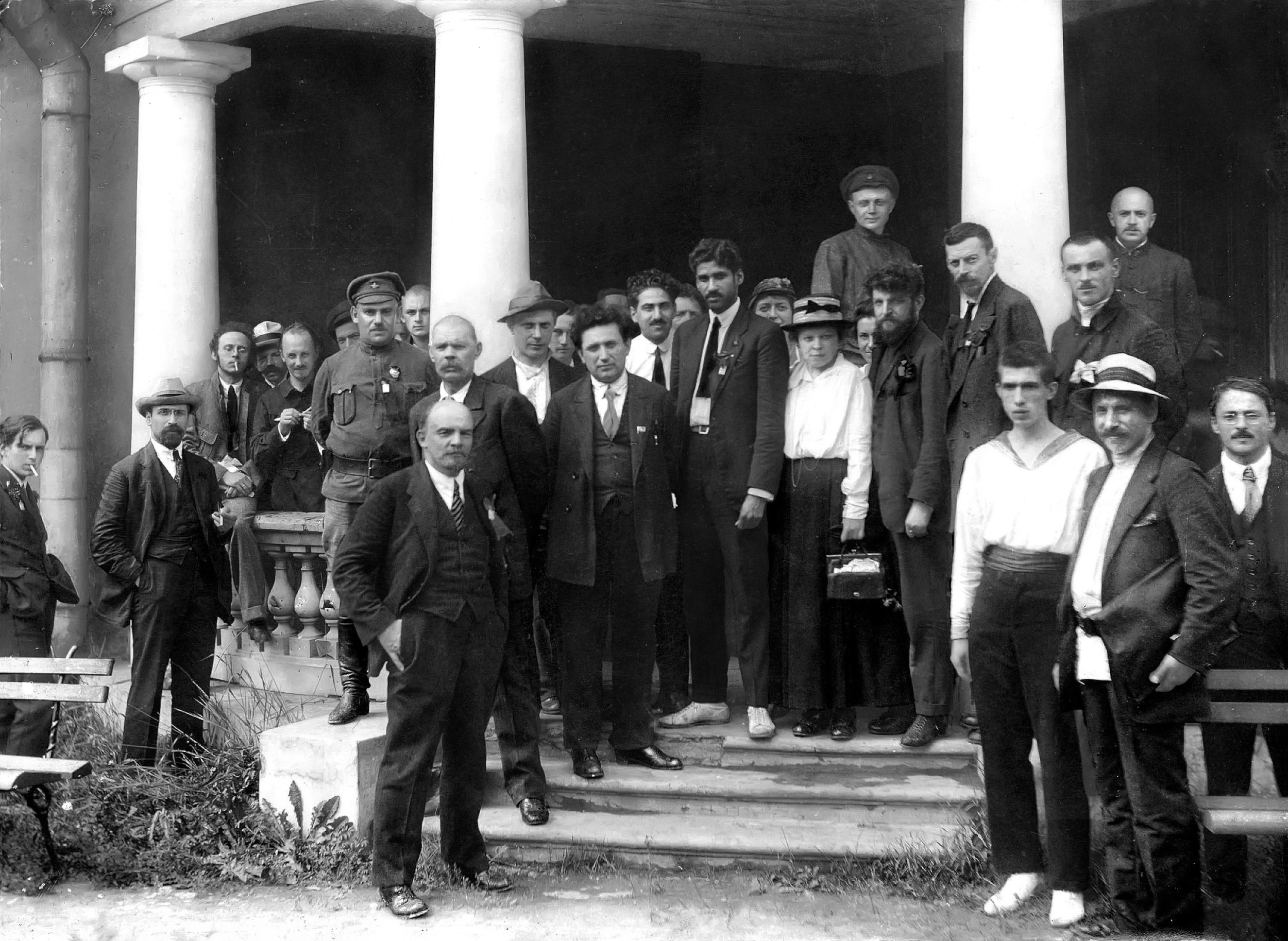
Roy photographed along with Lenin and other key Communist International leaders at the 2nd World Congress of the Communist International

M.N. Roy arrived in Moscow before the beginning of the 2nd World Congress of the Communist International, which was held July–August 1920. He attended the congress as a delegate with voting rights, representing the Communist Party of Mexico. Abani Mukherji (classified as a 'left socialist' by the congress organizers, non-voting delegate), Evelyn Trent-Roy (non-voting delegate, M. N. Roy's wife), M. P. T. Acharya (representing the Indian Revolutionary Association in Tashkent, non-voting delegate) and Mohamad Shafiq (observer) also attended the congress. A document, General Plan and Programme of Work for the Indian Revolution, was drafted by Roy and others during the congress. The document called for the establishment of an All India Revolutionary Centre to prepare for a congress of revolutionaries, the immediate foundation of a Communist Party of India and the immediate setting up of a school for the political-military training for Indian revolutionaries.

== Founding in Tashkent in October 1920 ==
The Second Congress of the Communist International laid out the course for the formation of an émigré Communist Party of India. The Executive Committee of the Communist International (ECCI) set up a Small Bureau which organized First Congress of the Peoples of the East at Baku in September 1920, and would oversee the preparations for the formation of the Indian Communist Party.

On 17 October 1920 a meeting was held in Tashkent, that constituted an Indian Communist Party on the basis of the principles of the Communist International. In attendance were seven individuals; Roy, Abani Mukherji, Acharya, Mohamed Shafiq Siddiqi, Mohamed Ali (Ahmed Hasan), Evelyn Trent-Roy and Rosa Fitingov. The meeting resolved that the party would articulate a programme for revolutionary struggle adapted to the Indian context. The meeting ended with the signing of The Internationale. The party bureau remained in Tashkent for some time. The party conducted propaganda and ideological activities, and would seek to coordinate efforts of communist groups inside India. A political school was operating at the India House, a one-storey building on Lavmentev Road in Tashkent located on the border between the 'old' and 'new' part of the city. By late 1920 Mukherji shared a draft party programme, but this document was rejected by Roy and thus not adopted.

At the India House, a group of 'muhajirs' resided. The 'muhajirs' were a group Indian Muslims who had been attempting to reach Turkey to fight for the defense of the caliphate there, but en route they were taken prisoners by Central Asian rebels and branded as infidels. When the muhajirs were rescued by the Red Army, 36 of them joined the Bolshevik military detachments. For the muhajirs the Young Bukharans (who were forming a Communist Party in Tashkent) served as an example. Soviet land reforms also impacted the political views of the muhajirs. Roy managed to enroll some 50 muhajirs into the Indian Military School in Tashkent, preparing them to take part in struggle against British colonial rule in India. At the India House the pan-Islamist muhajir and Roy's communist group cohabited. The communists frequently held politically lectures, in which they emphasized building a revolutionary mass movement to confront British rule (notably the communist lectures avoided direct attacks on religion). Shaukat Usmani, one of the India House muhajirs, eventually joined the communist group.

The émigré Indian Communist Party held a party meeting in Tashkent on 15 December 1920. A three-member Executive Committee was elected, consisting of Acharya (chairman), Shafiq (secretary) and Roy. The meeting admitted three persons as candidate members of the party – Abdul Qadir Sehrai, Masood Ali Shah Kazi and Akbar Shah (Salim). Five days later the party sent a short message to the Central Committee of the Communist Party of Turkestan and the Turkestan Bureau of the Communist International, affirming that the Communist Party of India had been founded per the principles of the Communist International and that the party was working under the political orientation of the Turkestan Bureau.

By early 1921 Roy shifted to Moscow, and took three students along (Usmani, Abdul Majid, Abdul Kadir Sehrai) with him for further political training in there. Mukherji was left in charge of the party bureau in Tashkent. After the Anglo-Soviet Trade Agreement in March 1921, which largely ended the Russian civil war, there were some 36–40 muhajirs who wished to receive further training and by mid-1921 they were shifted to the Communist University of the Toilers of the East at Moscow. Some of the muhajirs began returning from Soviet Russia, such as Usmani. A number of them were accused and convicted by the British authorities in the Peshawar Conspiracy Case.

The Communist International, through ECCI and the Turkestan Bureau, sought to resolve organizational and political issues of the Indian revolutionaries. Two groups sent delegations to Moscow in the first half of 1921. One of the delegations was sent by the Tashkent-based Indian Revolutionary Association led by Abdur Rab Barq. The other group visiting the Soviet capital came from Berlin, and included Virendranath Chattopadhyaya, G.A.K. Lohani, Bhupendranath Datta, Pandurang Sadashiv Khankhoje, Nalini Gupta and Agnes Smedley. The Eastern Commission and the India Commission of the Communist International sought to merge the Tashkent émigré CPI led by Roy, the Abdul Rab group and the Chattopadhyaya group, but these efforts did not achieve any organizational unity. Eventually the Commission opted to recognize the Tashkent CPI as the legitimate grouping. Whilst most of the 14 members from the Chattopadhyaya delegation left Moscow in disbelief, two individuals remained (one took up work at the Communist International headquarters whilst the other, Nalini Gupta, would become a key assistant to Roy).

Ahead of the 3rd World Congress of the Communist International the Small Bureau of ECCI listed 'Communist Groups' from India on the list of organizations invited to send delegations with consultative vote. Four delegates representing India took part in the proceedings, but only Roy was named in the congress documents.

Roy authored Manifesto to the 36th Indian National Congress, Ahmedabad, 1921. The text reached India secretly, and was distributed at the Ahmedabad Indian National Congress session in December 1921.

== Emergence of communist groups inside India ==
Looking at the period between the October Revolution and the emergence of the CPI, Ghosh (1996) identifies four groups of revolutionary nationalists;

- Exiled revolutionaries disillusioned with the programmes of the Non-cooperation movement and the Khilafat movement, who became influenced by the October Revolution – a group including Abani Mukherjee, M. N. Roy, Virendranath Chattopadhyaya, Mohamed Barakatullah Bhopali and M. P. T. Acharya.
- Individuals such as Shaukat Usmani, Muhammad Ali Sepasi, Rahmat Ali Khan, Firozuddin Mansoor and Abdul Majid, who belonged to the Khilafat and Hijrat Pan-Islamic movements but who came to be inspired by the October Revolution.
- Punjabi/Sikh diaspora in North America, organized in the Ghadar Party.
- National revolutionaries inside India, including left-wing elements emerging from the Gandhian movements, Indian National Congress, the Khilfat movement, Akali movement (in particular the Babbar Akali movement). Among the Gandhians leftists, there was dissatisfaction over the withdrawal of the first Non-cooperation movement which prompted them to turn towards the communist movement.

From the latter category, communist groups emerged in Lahore (the Inquilab group), Bombay (led by S. A. Dange), Bengal (led by Muzaffar Ahmad) and Madras (led by Singaravelu M. Chettiar). Sen and Ghosh (1991) argues that the four groups emerged independently from each other, and only the Lahore group had any knowledge of Roy's organization abroad. These different communist groups in India would later gather at the December 1925 Kanpur conference convened by Satyabhakta.

In late 1922 and early 1923 Roy reached out to Dange, Singaravelu, Muzaffar Ahmad and Shaukat Usmani to organize a conference in Berlin to unite the different communist groups in India. Dange and Singaravelu both decline the invite and the Berlin conference didn't materialize.

=== Bombay group ===
Sripad Amrit Dange was a student leader, rusticated from Wilson College during the non-cooperation movement. By mid-1921 Dange published the pamphlet Gandhi Vs. Lenin. Dange and his circle of friends began labour organizing activities. In August 1922 they began publishing Socialist, the first communist publication in India. K.N. Joglekar was the editor of Socialist. Socialist was distributed to members of the All India Congress Committee (AICC) and other Indian National Congress leaders. As of September 1922 Dange called for the formation of an 'Indian Socialist Labour Party of Indian National Congress' in an editorial in Socialist.

=== Calcutta group ===
Muzaffar Ahmad and Nazrul Islam issued a nationalist literary and political magazine Nabajug ('New Age') in Bengali language during the latter half of 1920. Ahmad acquired some Marxist literature in late 1921, from the first batch of such books smuggled to the city. In 1922 Ahmad began organizing activities among labourers in industrial centres around the city, such as Metiabruz.

=== Lahore group ===
A communist group emerged in Lahore around Ghulam Hussain, who was a former economics lecturer at Edwardes College Peshawar. His friend Mohammed Ali, one of the members of the Tashkent émigré communist organization, had won him over to Marxism by 1922. Hussain resigned from his teaching post and shifted to Lahore. In Lahore he was active in the Railway Workers Union. He edited a few copies of an Urdu publication called Inquilab.

=== Madras group ===
Singaravelu M. Chettiar belonged to the Indian National Congress and was an established trade union organizer before he became a Marxist. Ahead of the 1922 Gaya Session of the Indian National Congress Roy wrote Dange. Roy called on Dange to contact Singaravelu and Ghulam Hussain, to jointly organize a revolutionary mass party inside India. Roy wanted the formation of a legal political party that would be dominated by communists but would also include progressive nationalists. He requested Dange and Singaravelu to present a draft programme at the Gaya Session. On 19 December 1922 Roy sent another letter to Dange, instructing the latter on how to differentiate between the Communist Party and the open revolutionary mass party. Dange and Singaravelu maintained correspondence on the topic. On 1 May 1923 Singaravelu formed the Labour Kisan Party of Hindustan in Madras. For the first time in Indian history the red flag was unfurled in public. This party combined communist and nationalist symbolism, with its manifesto carrying both the hammer and sickle and the Ashoka Chakra. The manifesto carried both the nationalist slogan roti, kapra aur makan ('food, clothes and house') and workers of the world, unite. Roy and Dange welcomed the formation of the Labour Kisan Party, but each of the two issued criticisms of the party manifesto.

== Kanpur Bolshevik Conspiracy Case ==
Roy was unsatisfied by Singaravelu's Labour Kisan Party of Hindustan due the limitations of its manifesto, and Roy worked with Ghulam Hussain to organize an All India party. These efforts were interrupted by a wave of arrests that marked the beginning of the Kanpur Bolshevik Conspiracy Case – in May and June 1923 Hussain, Usmani and Ahmad were arrested.

There had been plans for a party conference to be held 30 June 1923 in Lucknow. But the plans to hold a founding congress of a centralised Indian Communist Party did not materialize, and the main communist leaders would be arrested in the Kanpur Bolshevik Conspiracy Case.

Nalini Gupta, who functioned as the intermediary between Roy and the communists in India, was arrested on 20 December 1923. Dange and Singaravelu were arrested in March 1924. Roy and R.L. Sharma were also named as accused in the case, but Roy was in Germany and Sharma in Pondicherry. Before being brought in front of sessions court, Ghulam Hussain confessed, appealed for mercy and offered to help the British prosecutors in the Peshawar Conspiracy Case against Mohamed Shafiq.

In contrast to the parallel Peshawar Conspiracy Case, the Kanpur Bolshevik Conspiracy Case aroused significant public attention and different efforts to support the accused were organized. The Indian Communist Defence Committee was formed, which supported the legal defense. Another committee headed by Charles Ashleigh was formed in London to help the accused. The French Communist Party sent a donation of 500 French francs to help the legal defense efforts.

In September 1924 Janaki Prasad Bagerhatta, an AICC member from Ajmer, authored an Open Letter to M.N. Roy published in Socialist. Bagerhatta called for building an open communist party, and that the party should work within the Indian National Congress and seek to conquer control of the organization.

== Satyabhakta's party-building initiative ==
Satyabhakta, who had been recently acquitted from the Kanpur Bolshevik Conspiracy Case, publicly announced the foundation of an Indian Communist Party of India in Kanpur in September 1924. Satyabhakta was encouraged by a statement by the Public Prosecutor in the Kanpur Bolshevik Conspiracy Case, that argued that they communists would not be persecuted due to their beliefs but only if they sought to overthrow the government by violence. Per Satyabhakta a communist party independent from the Communist International that didn't call for violence could prosper in the Indian context.

Satyabhakta named himself as the Secretary of the new party. He published a provisional constitution for the party, which called for an independent republic in which means of production and distribution would be nationalised. Satyabhakta's Communist Party of India would gather a total of 78 members, including 3 women. By 1925 party membership had grown to 150 per Satyabhakta's own account.

J. P. Begarhatta wrote a letter to Roy to inform him of the formation of the Satyabhakta-led party. Roy rejected Satyabhakta's party as illegitimate, being set up without the blessings of the Communist International. Roy accused the Satyabhakta group of being sponsored by the British authorities.

== 1925 Kanpur Conference ==
Satyabhakta announced that a conference would be held on 26 December 1925, on the side-lines of the Kanpur session of the Indian National Congress. Per Sen and Ghosh (1991) Dange was behind the idea to hold an open communist conference. At the time Dange was in jail, but he had managed to bring Satyabhakta onboard for the endeavor. Muzaffar Ahmad opposed the idea of a public communist conference. However he would attend the event, having been released from prison three months earlier due to health issues.

The First Indian Communist Conference was held in Kanpur 25–28 December 1925. The conference was attended by 300 delegates according to the February 1926 issue of Kirti (a communist-sponsored Punjabi magazine), though British intelligence sources put the figure at 500. The Kanpur communist conference was chaired by Singaravelu.

The conference declaration articulates the aim of the party being the creation of "a workers' and peasants' republic based on the socialisation of the means of production and distribution by the liberation of India from British imperialist domination." Shapurji Saklatvala, member of the British House of Commons belonging to the Communist Party of Great Britain, sent a short telegram to the conference.

The second session of the Kanpur conference was held in evening of 26 December 1925. The session adopted resolutions drafted by the resolutions committee. There were no disagreements in the conference plenary, but earlier in the day there had been an intense exchange of words in the resolutions committee. The resolutions committee was comprised on Satyabhakta, S.V. Ghate, K.N. Joglekar, J.P. Bagerhatta, S. Hassan and Krishnaswamy. A sharp disagreement emerged over the name of the party. Muzaffar Ahmad and others argued that the party should be named 'Communist Party of India', per the standard naming scheme of the Communist International. Satyabhakta wanted the party to be called 'Indian Communist Party', to emphasize its national character as association with the Communist International would cause repression by the British government. The name 'Communist Party of India' was adopted and Satyabhakta left the venue in protest.

At the Third Session of the Kanpur conference held on 27 February a party constitution was adopted and a Central Executive Committee (CEC) was elected. The CEC was supposed to have 30 members, but the Kanpur conference only elected 16 members. The remaining 14 CEC members were supposed to be inducted from different provincial organizations further on. Per Sen and Ghosh (1991) the adopted party constitution deviated from democratic centralism, with open party membership and allowing lower organs to define organizational rules locally.

The Central Executive Committee held its first meeting the following day at Singaravelu's camp. The meeting unanimously elected as party office bearers Satyabhakta, Azad Sobhani, Hasrat Mohani, and Baba Rana Choube from UP, Muzaffar Ahmad and Radha Mohan Gokulji from Calcutta, Kameswara Rao and Krishnaswamy Ayyangar from Madras, J. P. Bagerhatta, K. N. Joglekar, S. V. Ghate and R. S. Nimbkar from Bombay and S .D. Hassan, Ramchandra and Abdul Majid from Lahore. S. V. Ghate and J. P. Bagerhatta were elected as general secretaries of the party. Azad Sobhani was unanimously elected as party vice president for a one-year term. Singaravelu was named party president. His Labour Kisan Party of Hindustan dissolved into the Communist Party of India.

Satyabhakta (Kanpur), Muzaffar Ahmad (Calcutta), S. D. Hassan (Lahore) and Krishnaswamy Ayyangar (Madras) were named secretaries of the party, and placed in charge of the work of the party in their respective provinces until provincial committees could be established. The meeting resolved to set up the party headquarters in Bombay during the course of 1926, and it was decided that S. V. Ghate was to receive 60 rupees monthly to run the office.

== From Kanpur Conference to Meerut Case ==
During 1926–1929 (i.e. until the Meerut Conspiracy Case arrests) the CEC played a key role in building the Workers and Peasants Party and trade unions. The CEC met irregularly under clandestine conditions during these years.

Following the Kanpur conference J. P. Bagerhatta wrote a report to Roy. With some reluctance Roy responded that the CEC elected in Kanpur could serve as an entity to continue the work of party-building, if it respected five conditions,

- "the Communist Party of India in the process of formation" must immediately seek formal affiliation to the Communist International. Essential to this formal affiliation would be an unequivocal rejection of anti-Comintern statements of Satyabhakta, Hasrat Mohani and Signaravelu.
- that the party must operate underground
- the party must form a United Front with the nationalist movement, per the programme that Roy had presented to the Gaya session of the Indian National Congress.
- that Roy's émigré organization be recognized as the Foreign Bureau of the party, and that this Bureau would serve as the ideological centre of the party and as the liaison with the international communist movement.
- the party should set-up a book shop and distribute Roy's organ Masses within India.

The CEC complied to some extent to the instructions of Roy. His organ Masses was distributed by the party inside India. Roy's organization, now based in Moscow, was recognized as the Foreign Bureau and ideological centre of the party, but the recognition was conditioned that Roy's organization would have to conform to the programme and decisions of the party. The CEC intended to form a United Front, but did not follow Roy's United Front programme. The party did not formally affiliate itself with the Communist International, it did not purge its leadership of anti-Comintern elements and the party would not fully abandon ambitions to build a legal communist party.

The Central Executive Committee would be based in Kanpur after the 1925 conference. In late 1926 the party headquarters was moved to Bombay. The first party constitution was published in late 1926.

Satyabhakta resigned from the party in February 1926. After breaking away Satyabhakta would lead his own party, baptised as the 'National Communist Party'.

As of early 1927 the CPI Presidium consisted of Muzffar Ahmad (Calcutta), J. P. Bagerhatta (Rewari), Krishnaswamy Ayyangar (Madras), G .R. Darveshi (Lahore) and S. A. Dange (Bombay). S. V. Ghate and S. H. Mistry, both from Bombay, served as party general secretaries (with Mistry also holding the role of party treasurer). The CPI Executive consisted of Hasrat Mohani (Kanpur), Singaravelu (Madras), S. N. Tagore (Calcutta), M. A. Aajid (Lahore), R. S. Nimbkar (Bombay), H. A. Halim (Lahore) and K. N. Joglekar (Bombay). At the time the non-official party press organs were Ganavani (Calcutta), Kranti (Bombay) and Mehnatkash (Lahore). By mid-1927 J.P. Bagerhatta resigned from the party, as he had learned that the other party leaders had understood his role as a police infiltrator.

The CPI was not accepted as a section of the Communist International as the latter deemed the party as too small to qualify for membership. However at the 6th World Congress of the Communist International held in 1928 two CPI members were elected as alternate members of the Executive Committee of the Communist International.

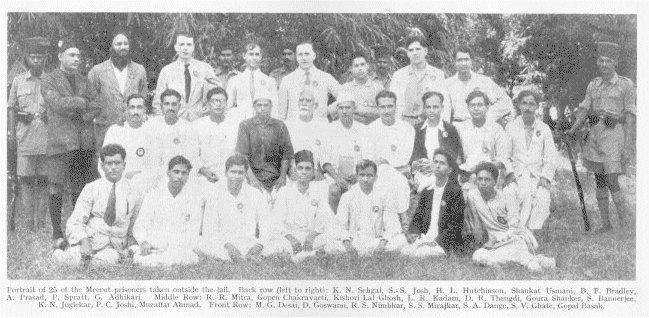
Portrait of 25 of the Meerut Prisoners taken outside the jail. Back row (left to right): K. N. Sehgal, S. S. Josh, H. L. Hutchinson, Shaukat Usmani, B. F. Bradley, A. Prasad, P. Spratt, G. Adhikari. Middle Row: Radharaman Mitra, Gopen Chakravarti, Kishori Lal Ghosh, L. R. Kadam, D. R. Thengdi, Goura Shanker, S. Bannerjee, K.N. Joglekar, P. C. Joshi, Muzaffar Ahmed. Front Row: M. G. Desai, D. Goswami, R.S. Nimbkar, S.S. Mirajkar, S.A. Dange, S.V. Ghate, Gopal Basak.

On 20 March 1929 a wave of arrests of Communist Party leaders took place, as the Meerut Conspiracy Case was launched against 31 prominent communists.

CPI was formally affiliated to the Communist International in 1930. When the leaders jailed in the Meerut Conspiracy Case had completed their sentences, the CPI could establish a functional all-India party centre by 1934.

== Foundation date controversy and the 1964 split ==
Prior to the 1964 split, different estimates of the CPI foundation date had existed within the party. In 1959 the Communist Party of Indonesia requested clarification from its Indian counterpart about its foundation date. The CPI Central Secretariat in its meeting 18 August 1959 resolved that the party had been founded in 1925. On 20 August 1959 B.T. Ranadive sent a letter to Review of Indonesia on behalf of the CPI Central Secretariat, which outlined that "[t]he Communist Party of India was founded in the month of December in the year 1925. Even before that, there were individual Communists and Communist groups working in different parts in the country. But it was in December 1925 at a meeting of representatives of various groups in the country held at Kanpur that the Communist Party of India was formed."

At the time the 1959 CPI leadership argued that the party founded in Tashkent had no link with communists inside India, nor with the labour or peasants movement, nor with the movement for national liberation inside the country. Moreover it was argued that the Tashkent group lacked recognition by the Communist International, and had no party programme or constitution. Talwar (1985) interprets the 1959 decision by the CPI party leadership as a move to discredit Roy (who was expelled from the communist movement as a 'renegade') from having any role in the foundation of the party.

However in 1960 the CPI West Bengal State Council Bengal resolved to organize a 40th party founding anniversary celebration in 1961 (referring to 1920 as the foundation date of the party). E.M.S. Namboodiripad, then the acting general secretary, wrote to the West Bengal State Council asking it to respect the decision of the CPI National Council on the matter, and that the issue would be dealt with in a later meeting.

The Central Secretariat of CPI issued a statement on 5 June 1963, under the heading 'Foundation Day of Communist Party of India', affirming that the party was founded in Kanpur in 1925 whilst the CPI had treated the 'Tashkent Group' as a Foreign Bureau of the party.

One the Kanpur conference participants, Muzaffar Ahmad, would side with CPI(M) in the 1964 split. Five years after the split his autobiographical work Myself and the CPI was published. In this book Ahmad affirms that the 1920 Tashkent conference should be considered as the foundation of the CPI, per the linkage with the Communist International. He describes the Kanpur conference as a 'tamasha', and argued that the Communist International did not recognize the meeting. Rafiq Ahmed, a muhajir that had gone to Tashkent, supported the claim that CPI was founded in 1920. Evelyn Roy, quoted by Jane Degras, also argued CPI was founded in October 1920.

Talwar (1985) affirms that the Communist International recognized the Tashkent group and entrusted Roy and his group with the task of building the Communist Party in India, but that the groups inside India that Roy organized were small, lacked financial resources and lacked ideological maturity. Muzaffar Ahmed would later argue that by 1921 the communists in India had only superficial understanding of Marxism. During this period Roy worked hard to gather different heterogenous left-wing groups into a single party, but building effective communication lines was a difficult task. Dange would later deny that the Tashkent party had been recognized by the Communist International.

Mohit Sen (1970), who had sided with CPI in the 1964 split, stated that "[t]here is some dispute as to whether the foundation date of the party should be taken as October 1920 in Tashkent or as June 1925 in Kanpur. Examination of evidence would however lead one to the conclusion that while the CPI set up at Tashkent was recognised by the Third International, it did not have any branches in India nor did the delegates assembled there come with any mandate from any communist groups in India. Nor is it correct to state that it was the delegates from the Tashkent conference who came back to India and got the CPI going. It is true that the Comintern and in particular M. N. Roy played an important role in ideologically and politically guiding and aiding the communist groups in India. But the coming together of these groups was also due to the strenuous efforts of communists within the country, particularly those working in Calcutta, Bombay, Lahore and Madras. These groups had quite some years of work behind them, both in the field of trade-union organisation and also in the national movement itself." Along similar lines Ghosh and Sen (1991) stated that "the group formed in Tashkent-Moscow during 1920–21 was still-born. Hastily formed without any ground-work, it had no constitution or programme. In fact it was a handiwork of Roy to secure himself a berth in the Communist International (CI). What is most important, the émigré revolutionaries had no roots in the masses of India and their subjective creation was never internalised in the society it sought to transform. So in no sense can the Tashkent formation be regarded as the formation of CPI." Gangadhar Adhikari argued that the formation of the émigré CPI in Tashkent was the initiative of the muhahijrs and other revolutionaries in exile like the Abdul Rab-Acharya group. Per Adhikari neither Roy nor the Communist International promoted the October 1920 Tashkent meeting, but that Roy reluctantly attended it.

CPI(M) general secretary Harkishan Singh Surjeet stated in 1993 that "[t]he CPI takes the position that it was formed in Kanpur in December 1925 whereas our Party [CPI(M)] has stated that it was formed in October 1920 in Tashkent. The fact to be noted here is that neither the Party formed in Tashkent nor in Kanpur had a full-fledged programme. It was only in 1930 that a full-fledged programme of the Communist Party of India under the title Platform of Action was announced and in reality it was only after the release of Meerut conspiracy case prisoners that a real centralised party came into existence in December 1933".

== See also ==
- Communism in India
