= Socialism in India =

Socialism in India is a political movement founded early in the 20th century, as a part of the broader movement to gain Indian independence from colonial rule. The movement grew quickly in popularity as it espoused the causes of India's farmers and labourers against the zamindars, the princely class, and the landed gentry. After independence and until the early 1990s, socialism shaped some economic and social policies of the Indian government, although they mostly followed the principles of dirigisme. After this period, India moved towards a more market-based economy, though India is officially a socialist state as per the preamble to the constitution.

== History ==
In 1871, a group in Calcutta had contacted Karl Marx with the purpose of organizing an Indian section of the First International. The first article in an Indian publication (in English) that mentions the names of Marx & Engels printed in the Modern Review in March 1912. The short biographical article titled Karl Marx – a modern Rishi was written by the German-based Indian revolutionary Lala Har Dayal. The first biography of Karl Marx in an Indian language was written by R. Rama Krishna Pillai in 1914.

Marxism made a major impact in Indian media at the time of the Russian Revolution. Of particular interest to many Indian papers and magazines was the Bolshevik policy of right to self-determination of all nations. Bipin Chandra Pal and Bal Gangadhar Tilak were amongst the prominent Indians who expressed their admiration of Lenin and the new rulers in Russia. Abdul Sattar Khairi and Abdul Zabbar Khairi went to Moscow, immediately on hearing about the revolution. In Moscow, they met Lenin and conveyed their greetings to him. The Russian Revolution also affected émigré Indian revolutionaries, such as the Ghadar Party in North America.

The Khilafat movement contributed to the emergence of early Indian communism. Many Indian Muslims left India to join the defense of the Caliphate. Several of them became communists whilst visiting Soviet territory. Some Hindus also joined the Muslim muhajirs in their travels to the Soviet areas.

The colonial authorities were clearly disturbed by the growing influence of Bolshevik sympathies in India. A first counter-move was the issuing of a fatwa, urging Muslims to reject communism. The Home Department established a special branch to monitor the communist influence. Customs was ordered to check the imports of Marxist literature to India. A great number of anti-communist propaganda publications were published.

The First World War was accompanied by a rapid increase of industries in India, resulting in a growth of an industrial proletariat. At the same time prices of essential commodities increased. These were factors that contributed to the buildup of the Indian trade union movement. Unions were formed in the urban centers across India, and strikes were organized. In 1920, the All India Trade Union Congress was founded.

One Indian impressed with developments in Russia was S. A. Dange in Bombay. In 1921, he published a pamphlet titled Gandhi Vs. Lenin, a comparative study of the approaches of both the leaders, with Lenin coming out as better of the two. Together with Ranchoddas Bhavan Lotvala, a local mill owner, a library of Marxist literature was set up, and the publishing of translations of Marxist classics began. In 1922, with Lotvala's help, Dange launched the English weekly, Socialist, the first Indian Marxist journal.

Regarding the political situation in the colonised world, the 1920 second congress of the Communist International insisted that a united front should be formed between the proletariat, peasantry and national bourgeoisie in the colonised countries. Among the twenty-one conditions drafted by Lenin ahead of the congress was the 11th thesis, which stipulated that all communist parties must support the bourgeois-democratic liberation movements in the colonies. Some of the delegates opposed the idea of an alliance with the bourgeoisie and preferred support for communist movements in these countries instead. Their criticism was shared by the Indian revolutionary M.N. Roy, who attended as a delegate of the Communist Party of Mexico. The congress removed the term 'bourgeois-democratic' in what became the 8th condition.

A Communist Group was founded in Tashkent on 17 October 1920, soon after the Second Congress of the Communist International by M.N. Roy. Roy made contacts with Anushilan and Jugantar groups in Bengal. Small communist groups were formed in Bengal (led by Muzaffar Ahmed), Bombay (led by S.A. Dange), Madras (led by Singaravelu Chettiar), United Provinces (led by Shaukat Usmani) and Punjab (led by Ghulam Hussain).

On 1 May 1923, the Labour Kisan Party of Hindustan was founded in Madras, by Singaravelu Chettiar. The LKPH organised the first May Day celebration in India, and this was also the first time the red flag was used in India.

On 25 December 1925, the Communist Party of India formed at the first Party Conference in Kanpur, then Cawnpore. S.V. Ghate was the first General Secretary of CPI. The conference was held from 25 to 28 December 1925. Colonial authorities estimated that 500 persons took part in the conference. The conference was convened by a man called Satyabhakta, of whom little is known. Satyabhakta is said to have argued for a ‘national communism’ and against subordination under Comintern. Being outvoted by the other delegates, Satyabhakta left the conference venue and later the party in protest. Satyabhakta then formed a party called the National Communist Party, which lasted until 1927. The conference adopted the name ‘Communist Party of India.’ Groups such as LKPH dissolved into the unified CPI. The émigré CPI, which probably had little organic character anyway, was effectively substituted by the organisation now operating inside India.

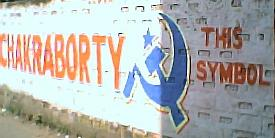
Communist electoral mural in Jadavpur.

There are many smaller Marxist parties, including the Communist Party of India (Marxist-Leninist), Marxist Communist Party of India, Marxist Coordination Committee in Jharkhand, Janathipathiya Samrakshana Samithy, Communist Marxist Party and BTR-EMS-AKG Janakeeya Vedi in Kerala, Mazdoor Mukti (Workers' Emancipation) and Party of Democratic Socialism in West Bengal, Janganotantrik Morcha in Tripura, the Ram Pasla group in Punjab, and the Orissa Communist Party in Orissa.

== Political parties ==
Under Section 29A(5) of the Representation of the People Act, 1951, allegiance to the principles of socialism is one of the mandatory requirements to be stated in the memorandum of rules and regulations of any association that wishes to register as a political party with the Election Commission of India. There have been several legal challenges to inclusion of the word “socialism” and “secular” in the preamble to the constitution of India; however, the Supreme Court of India has rejected these petitions.

At the 1931 Karachi session of the Indian National Congress, socialist pattern of development was set as the goal for India. Through the 1955 Avadi Resolution of the Indian National Congress, a socialistic pattern of development was presented as the goal of the party. A year later, the Indian parliament adopted the 'socialistic pattern of development' as official policy, a policy that came to include land reforms and regulations of industries. The word socialist was added to the Preamble of the Indian Constitution by the 42nd amendment act of 1976, during the Emergency. It implies social and economic equality. Social equality in this context means the absence of discrimination on the grounds only of caste, creed, sex, religion, or language, etc. Under social equality, everyone has equal status and opportunities. Economic equality in this context means that the government will endeavour to make the distribution of wealth more equal and provide a decent standard of living for all.

Communists were also active in the Indian independence movement and have played a significant role in India's political life, although they are fragmented into a multitude of different parties. Communist parties represented in parliament are: (statistics from 2024 General Elections) Communist Party of India (Marxist) (4 seats in the Lok Sabha), the Communist Party of India (2 seats), the Communist Party of India (Marxist–Leninist) Liberation (2 seats), the Revolutionary Socialist Party (1 seat).

Aside from the Congress and the Left Front, there are other socialist parties active in India, notably the Samajwadi Party, which emerged from the Janata Dal, formed by Mulayam Singh Yadav, former Chief Minister of Uttar Pradesh and Union Defence Minister, and now led by his son Akhilesh Yadav, also a former Chief Minister of Uttar Pradesh. It has 37 seats in the 18th Lok Sabha. The Trinamool Congress, formed by Mamata Banerjee, also self-identifies as a socialist party.

== See also ==
- Anarchism in India
- Communism in India
- Communism in Kerala
- Fabian Society
- List of political parties in India
- Marxist historiography
- Politics of India
- Secularism in India
- Licence Raj
- List of communist parties in India
