= Socialist Party (India, 1948) =

Historical Indian political party

- Founder: Jayaprakash Narayan; Ram Manohar Lohia
- Founded: 1948; 78 years ago
- Dissolved: September 1952; 73 years ago
- Preceded by: Congress Socialist Party
- Succeeded by: Praja Socialist Party
- Ideology: Socialism
- Political position: Left-wing
- Colours
- ECI Status: Dissolved

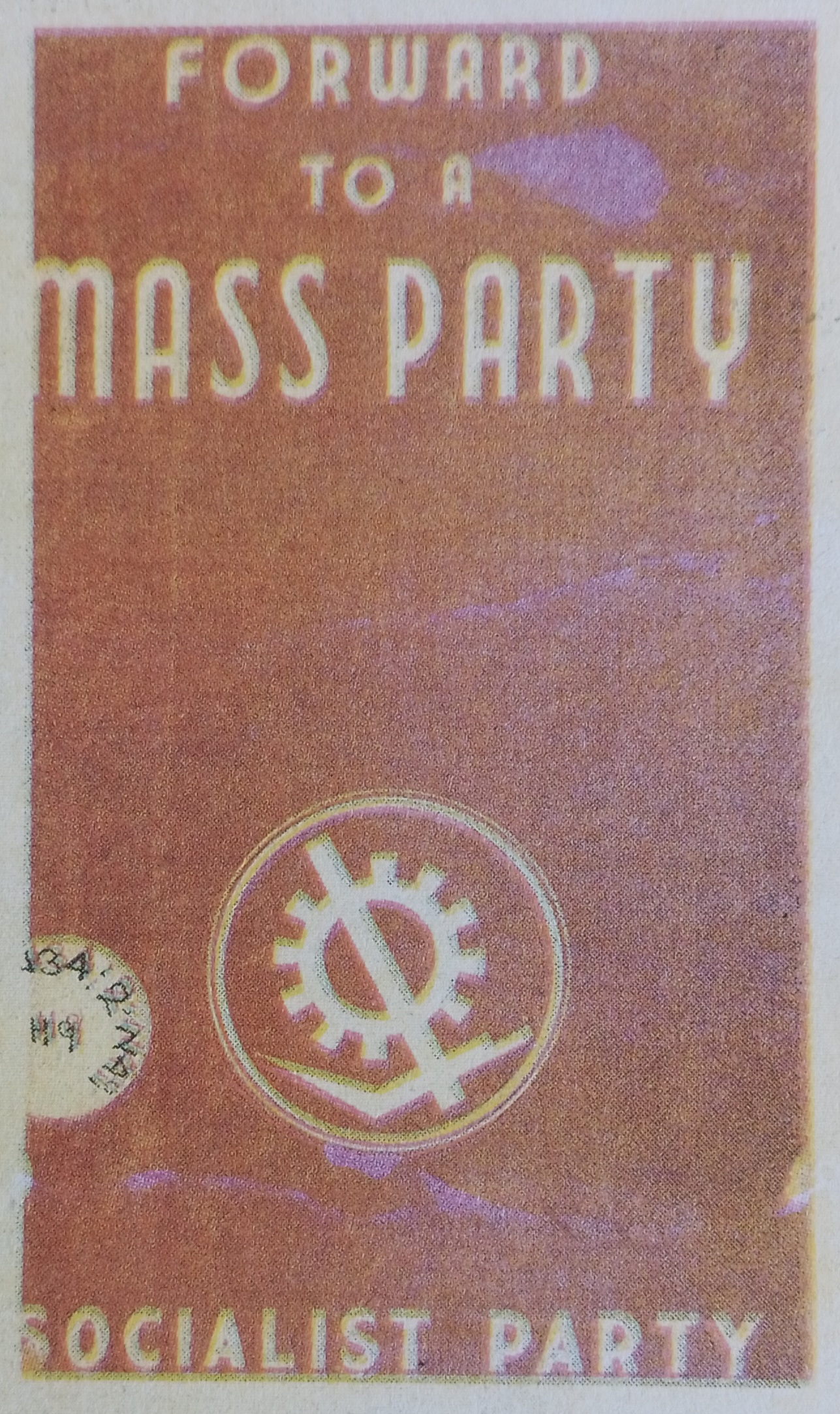
A poster of the Socialist Party

The Socialist Party was an Indian political party. It won 12 seats at the 1951 Indian general election, coming third. Despite Jayaprakash Narayan's personal popularity, its electoral fortunes did not improve. It merged with the Kisan Mazdoor Praja Party, which was formed by J.B. Kripalani, to form the Praja Socialist Party.

The Socialist Party was re-formed in 1972 through a merger between factions of the Samyukta Socialist Party and the Praja Socialist Party.

== See also ==
- Socialism in India
- List of political parties in India
