= Majji Sundarayya Patrudu =

Indian politician and trade unionist

Majji Sundarayya Patrudu (died 16 February 2004, Visakhapatnam) was an Indian communist politician and trade unionist from Andhra Pradesh. At the time of his death he was the general secretary of the All India Centre of Trade Unions and a Central Committee member of the Marxist Communist Party of India.

M.S. Patrudu contested the 1999 Andhra Pradesh Legislative Assembly election from the Visakhapatnam-I constituency. He got 676 votes (0.9% of the votes in the constituency).
