= Naravoor Para =

Village in Keralam, India

Naravoor Para, is a small village near Kuthuparamba in the Kannur District of Kerala, India.

== Etymology ==
The name Naravoor is derived from the Malayalam words Narante Ooru ("place of man") and Para ("rock"). Thus "Naravoor Para" literally means "the place of human in the rocks". This name may be the indication of early settlements in this region.

== Location ==
Naravoor Para is bordered by Thekelamukk in west, ''Karyattupuram''. in east, Mooriyad in North and Muthiyanga in south.

== History ==
During the early 1970s, a boom in rock mining in the nearby quarries provided jobs to the residents, and continued up to the early 1990s. Environmental concerns and legal proceedings caused the quarries to stop their operations, and a majority of the villagers then shifted to building and construction work. Th construction boom persists in the region, due to the inflow of money from the local diaspora in the Middle East.

== Politics ==
Being located in the heart of Kuthuparamb block panchayat (which is a left stronghold), Naravoor Para is a village with majority of the residents as Left supporters.

== Landmarks ==
Naravoor Para has a Community centre named Sree Narayana Smaraka Vayanasala and Grandalayam, which serves as an evening hangout, reading room, internet service centre and even a library. A pre-primary school is located near the Vayanasala, and the MES Arts and Science College is situated on the hill. Kuthuparamb-Karyattupuram and Mooriyad-Naravoor Para are the two main roads. There are two quarries near naravoor para in mooriyad named chekkapara. There was shot a prwithiraj film (VARGAM).

== Transportation ==
The national highway passes through Kannur town. Goa and Mumbai can be accessed on the northern side and Cochin and Thiruvananthapuram can be accessed on the southern side. The road to the east of Iritty connects to Mysore and Bangalore. The nearest railway station is Kannur on Mangalore-Palakkad line. Trains are available to almost all parts of India subject to advance booking over the internet. There are airports at Mattanur, Mangalore and Calicut. All of them are international airports but direct flights are available only to Middle Eastern countries.
