= Mohan Punamia =

Indian trade unionist and politician

Mohan Punamia was an Indian trade unionist and politician. Punamia, then the Rajasthan secretary of the All India Trade Union Congress, was detained and jailed 1964-1965 under Defense of India Rules.

In April 1964 Punamia was one of 32 members of the Communist Party of India National Council that broke away and formed the Communist Party of India (Marxist). He served as the CPI(M) Rajasthan State Committee secretary. When the Centre of Indian Trade Unions was founded in 1970, Punamiya became the founding president of CITU in Rajasthan.

In 1981 Punamia was expelled from CPI(M). A split also occurred in CITU, in 1982 Punamia founded the Rajasthan Trade Union Centre. In 1983 he founded a new party, the Marxist Communist Party of India (MCPI). Punamia served as secretary of MCPI. In 1986 he founded the All India Centre of Trade Unions.

He died in Jaipur on 4 July 1997.
