= All India Federation of Democratic Women =

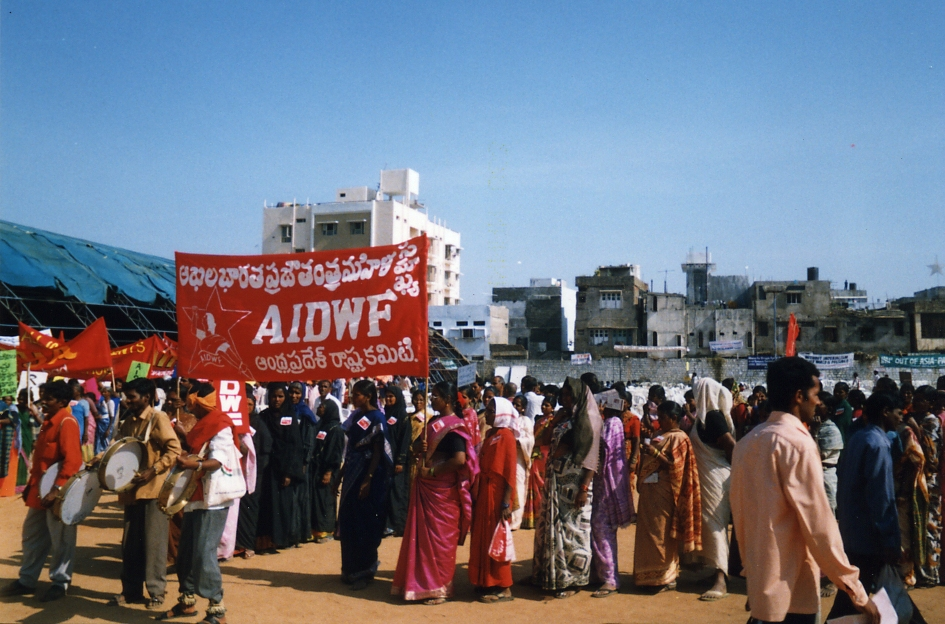
AIFDW demonstrators at the Asian Social Forum in Hyderabad

All India Federation of Democratic Women is a women's organisation in India, and the women's wing of the Marxist Communist Party of India (United). P. Krishnammal, a Kerala State Committee member of MCPI(U), is the general secretary of AIFDW. Previously, it was the women's wing of the main predecessor of MCPI(U), the Marxist Communist Party of India.

== See also ==
- Krantikari Adivasi Mahila Sangathan
- Mahila Atma Raksha Samiti
- National Federation of Indian Women
