= Kanpur Bolshevik Conspiracy case =

1924 court case in British India

The Kanpur Bolshevik Conspiracy Case was a controversial court case initiated in British India in 1924.

After Peshawar in 1922, two more conspiracy cases were prosecuted by the British government, one in Kanpur (1924) and another in Meerut (1929). The accused in the cases included, among others, important communist organisers who worked in India, such as S. V. Ghate, S. A. Dange, Muzaffar Ahmad, and Akshay Thakur, and members of the émigré Communist Party of India (Tashkent group), such as Rafiq Ahmad and Shaukat Usmani.

In March 1924, S. A. Dange, M. N. Roy, Muzaffar Ahmad, Nalini Gupta, Shaukat Usmani, Malayapuram Singaravelu, Ghulam Hussain, and other communists were charged with seeking "to deprive the King Emperor of his sovereignty of British India, by complete separation of India from Britain by a violent revolution" in what was called the Cawnpore (now spelt Kanpur) Bolshevik Conspiracy case. It brought scrutiny of an alleged Comintern plan to foment revolution in India: "Pages of newspapers daily splashed sensational communist plans and people for the first time learned such a large scale about communism and its doctrines and the aims of the Communist International in India". The case was considered a key factor in introducing communism to the Indian masses.

Singaravelu Chettiar was released on account of illness. M. N. Roy was out of the country and therefore could not be arrested. Ghulam Hussain confessed that he had received money from the Russians in Kabul and was pardoned. Muzaffar Ahmed, Shaukat Usmani and Dange were sentenced to four years imprisonment. This highly publicized case was considered a key factor in introducing communism to the Indian masses.

Britain triumphantly declared that the Kanpur case had "finished off the communists". But the industrial town of Kanpur witnessed in December 1925 a conference of different communist groups, under the chairmanship of Singaravelu Chettiar. Among the key organizers were Dange, Muzaffar Ahmed, Nalini Gupta, and Usmani. The conference adopted a resolution to form a new Communist Party of India (CPI) with headquarters in Bombay (now: Mumbai). Because of the British Government's extreme hostility toward Bolsheviks, the CPI decided to not operate as an avowed communist party, but instead to set up a non-federated platform under the name, Workers and Peasants Party.

== See also ==
- Communism in India
- Foundation of the Communist Party of India
- Meerut Conspiracy Case
- Peshawar Conspiracy Cases
