= Jagjit Singh Lyallpuri =

Indian politician (1917–2013)

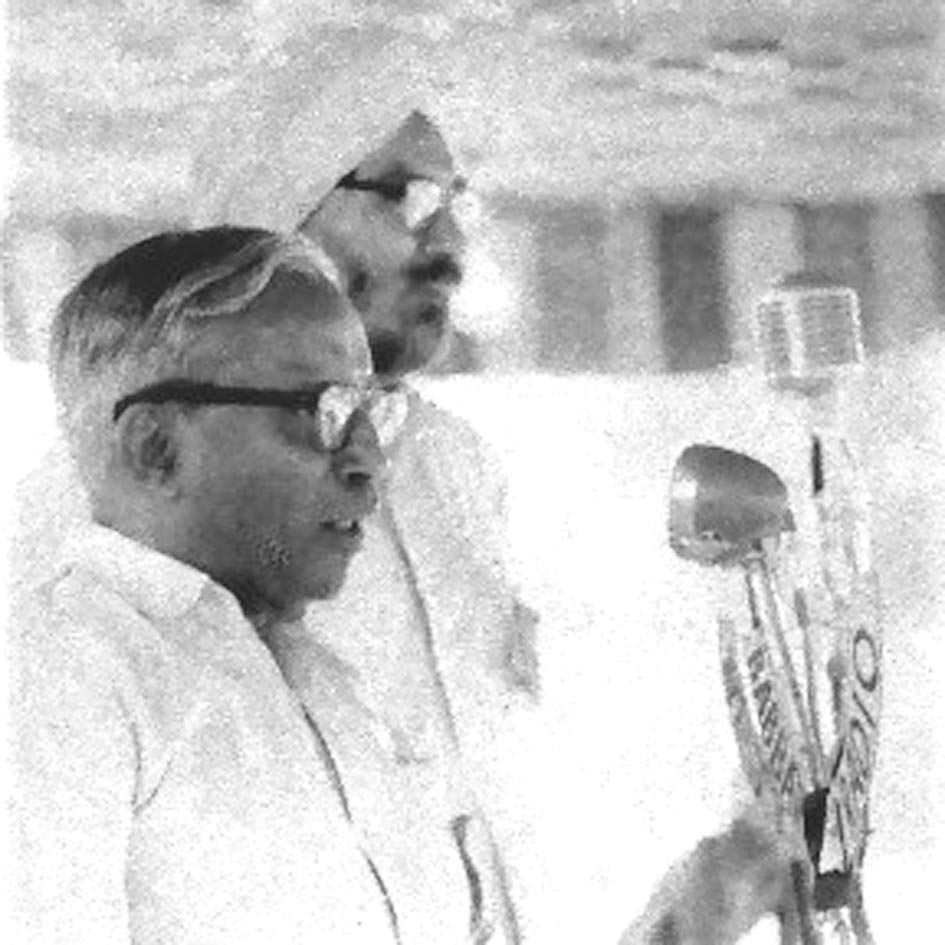
- E. M. S. Namboodiripad (left) with Lyallpuri in 1966
- Born: 10 April 1917; Lyallpur, Punjab, British India
- Died: 27 May 2013 (aged 96); Ludhiana, Punjab, India
- Education: Khalsa College, Amritsar; Government Law College, Lahore
- Political party: Indian National Congress (1935–1940); Punjab Kirti Kisan Party (1940–1944); Communist Party of India (1944–1964); Communist Party of India (Marxist) (1964–1992); Marxist Communist Party of India (1992–2005); Marxist Communist Party of India (United) (from 2005)

Jagjit Singh Lyallpuri (10 April 1917 – 27 May 2013) was an Indian politician. He was the oldest surviving member of the founding Central Committee of the Communist Party of India (Marxist).

== Political activist ==
Prior to the Partition of India, Lyallpuri's family owned roughly 150–180 acres of land in Lyallpur (present-day Faisalabad, in Pakistan). The young Lyallpuri became a political activist through the student movement in the 1930s and after finishing his BSc at Khalsa College in Amritsar he joined the Indian National Congress at the age of 18. Lyallpuri's parents were reluctant towards his entry into politics. They preferred that he'd embark on a professional career instead. Lyallpuri obtained his LLB from the Government Law College in Lahore in 1940. He soon became a professional revolutionary and cadre of the Kirti Kisan Party, was included in the Central Committee of the party and a leader of the Punjab Kisan Sabha. The Kirti Kisan Party later merged into the Communist Party of India.

== After Partition ==
As a result of Partition, Lyallpuri moved to Ludhiana. Within the Communist Party, he opposed B.T. Ranadive's line of launching guerrilla struggles. Lyallpuri was jailed between 1949 and 1951, when the Communist Party was banned. Whilst in jail, he was ordered by the party leadership to instigate a prisoner revolt, which led to riots and a hunger strike. He fasted for nine weeks.

In April 1953, he was elected Joint Secretary of the All India Kisan Sabha, at its 11th conference in Cannanore. He would hold this post for 18 years.

Lyallpuri was a member of the National Council of CPI, elected at the 1958 extraordinary party conference in Amritsar. In 1961 he became the general secretary of the All India Kisan Sabha. In 1959 Lyallpuri and Harkishan Singh Surjit emerged as the leaders of a mass peasants struggle against the Khush Hasiyati Tax, a campaign mobilised by the Punjab State Committee of the Communist Party.

== In CPI(M) ==
In 1964, he took part in the founding of the Communist Party of India (Marxist). He was a member of the founding Central Committee of the party. He remained in the post as All India Kisan Sabha general secretary until 1968. Lyallpuri was jailed during the 1975 Emergency.

During his years as a CPI(M) leader, Lyallpuri found himself in constant conflicts with the party leadership.

Lyallpuri contested the Ludhiana Rural seat in the 1980 Punjab Legislative Assembly election, finishing in second place with 17,874.

== Dissident leader ==
In 1992 Lyallpuri led a split in the CPI(M) in protest against rapprochement with the Congress Party. Lyallpuri and other CPI(M) dissidents joined the Marxist Communist Party of India. Lyallpuri became the general secretary of MCPI.

When the Marxist Communist Party of India (United) was founded in 2005, Lyallpuri became its general secretary.

== Autobiography ==
In 2010 Lyallpuri released his autobiography, My Life My Times.
