= Abani Mukherji =

Cofounder of the Communist Party of India

Abaninath Mukherji অবনীনাথ মুখার্জি
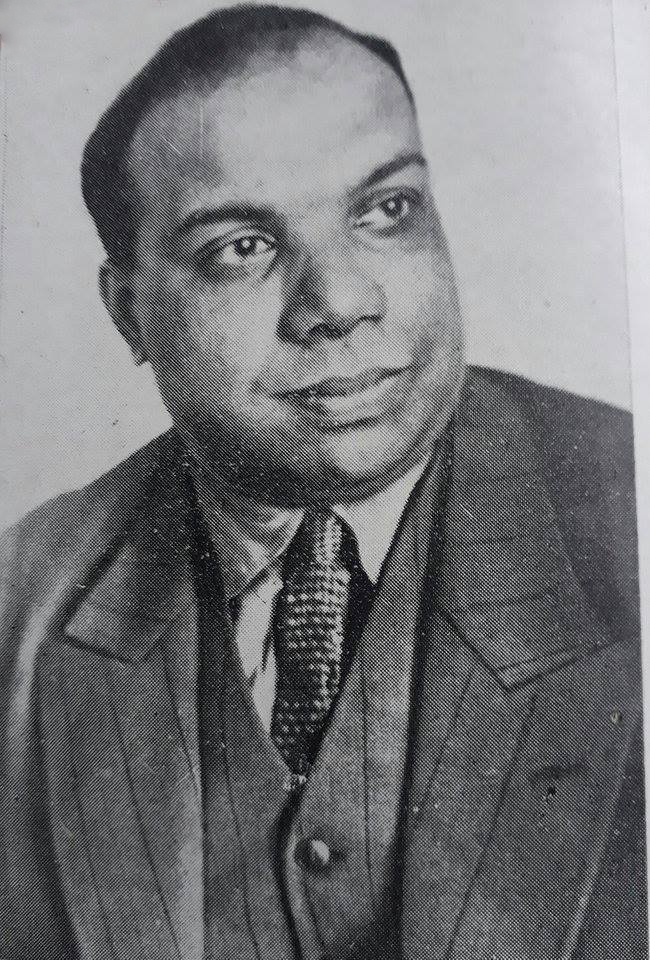
- Born: 3 June 1891; Jubbulpore, British India
- Died: 28 October 1937 (aged 46); Moscow, USSR
- Occupation: Revolutionary

Abaninath Mukherji (Bengali: অবনীনাথ মুখার্জি, Russian: Абанинатх Трайлович Мукерджи, (Note: His Russian name was spelt variously Абани/Абони/Абанинатх Троилокович/Трайлович Мукерджи/Мухарджи/Мухараджи (Abani/Aboni/Abaninath Trailokovich/Troilokovich/Traylovich Mukerdzhi/Muhardzhi/Muharadzi). The second part of the Russian version of the name (Trailokovich) is a patronymic, traditional in Russian appellations. Abani Mukherji's biography (in Russian)) 3 June 1891 – 28 October 1937) was an Indian communist and émigré based in the USSR who co-founded the Communist Party of India (Tashkent group). His name was often spelt Abani Mukherjee.

== Biography ==
=== Early life ===
Mukherji was born in British ruled India to very poor weaver parents in the central town of Jabalpur. Abani Mukherji's father was Trailokyanath Mukherji and his family was Hindu. After leaving school, he moved to Ahmedabad, where he trained as a weaver, and in 1910 he was employed as an assistant weaving master at the Bangla Laxmi Cotton Mills. In 1912, he was sent to Germany to study weaving. In Germany, he encountered socialism. After returning to Calcutta in December of the same year, he was employed at another cotton mill, Andrew Yule Mill.

=== Revolutionary activities ===
In 1914, Mukherji met Rash Behari Bose and joined the revolutionary movement. In 1915, he was sent to Japan to acquire weapons for the revolutionaries. According to British Raj intelligence reports, he was active in the Hindu–German conspiracy. In September 1915, while on his return journey to India, he was arrested in Singapore and incarcerated at the Fort Canning prison there, where he remained until he escaped in the autumn of 1917. The exact details of his escape are unclear, but he told his friend Suniti Kumar Chatterji that he was assisted by a group of sympathetic Irish soldiers. Mukherji managed to reach Java in the Dutch East Indies, where he stayed until the end of 1919, living under the name of Dar Shaheer. In Java, he was in contact with Indonesian and Dutch revolutionaries and became a communist. He also travelled to Amsterdam and back. In Amsterdam, he met S. J. Rutgers, who recommended him as a delegate to the Second Congress of the Communist International.

=== Communist International ===
In 1920, Mukherji traveled to Russia to take part in the Second Congress of the Communist International. There he met M. N. Roy, and with Roy and Roy's wife Evelyn he drafted a document which was published in Glasgow Socialist on 24 June 1920, under the title The Indian Communist Manifesto. Like Mukherji, Roy had been an Anushilan Samiti member during his early political life.

Mukherji took part as a delegate in the Second Congress of the Communist International, held in Petrograd between 19 July – 7 August 1920. In the Russian language notes of the Congress, he is listed as a 'left-socialist', without party affiliation being stated. At the Congress, Mukherji met Vladimir Lenin for the first time. Directly after the Congress, Mukherji traveled to Baku in Soviet Azerbaijan to represent India at the Congress of the Peoples of the East.

The Communist Party of India (Tashkent group) was founded in Tashkent on 17 October 1920, two months after the end of the Second Congress of the Communist International. The principal movers in the founding of the party were Roy and Mukherji. After the founding of CPI, Roy returned to Moscow whilst Mukherji was put in charge of the Indian Military School, with the task of training armed forces to fight British colonialism. The same year, Mukherji became a member of the Russian Communist Party (Bolsheviks).

The following year, 1921, Mukherji went to Moscow to attend the Third Congress of the Communist International as a delegate with a consultative vote. There he also took part in a meeting of Indian revolutionaries.

Also in 1921, Mukherji drafted a document on the Malabar rebellion, which he sent to Lenin. In 1922, Roy and Mukherji together wrote the book India in Transition, a Marxist analysis of the Indian Rebellion of 1857, which the Communist International published in four languages in 1922. The book argued that the 1857 rebellion had failed to rid India of feudalism. Roy had assigned to Mukherji the task of gathering statistical data for the book.

=== Return to India ===
In December 1922, Mukherji returned from Moscow to India clandestinely, via Berlin. He privately met local communist leaders on his way. Once in India, he was sheltered by the Anushilan Samiti in Dacca. After meeting S. A. Dange at the Gaya session of the Indian National Congress in December 1922, and after meeting Bengal communist groups, Mukherji moved to Madras, where he met Singaravelu Chettiar. Mukherji helped Chettiar with his efforts to form the Labour Kisan Party of Hindustan and to draw up its manifesto. Mukherji later returned to the Soviet Union.

=== Split with Roy ===
Roy and Mukherji did however part ways and became bitter enemies. Mukherji learnt that during his travel to India, Roy had sent a circular to the Indian communist groups denouncing him and claiming that he did not represent the Communist International. By the mid-1920s, the break between them was complete.

Mukherji took an uncompromising attitude towards cooperation with nationalist sectors. In 1928, he described the Workers and Peasants Party as 'the party that is accumulating by itself the elements of future Indian Fascism.'

=== 1930s ===
During the 1930s, most of Mukherji's work was academic. He was an indologist at the Oriental Institute of the Academy of Sciences of the USSR, and became president of the All Union Association of Orientalists. He also worked at the Communist Academy.

=== Death ===
Mukherji was executed in the Great Purge by Joseph Stalin in the late 1930s, but his death was only acknowledged by the Soviet Union after 1955. Mukherji was arrested on 2 June 1937. He was assigned for the first category of repression (execution by shooting) in the list "Moscow-Center" and executed on 28 October 1937.

== Personal life ==
In 1920, while in Russia, Mukherji met Rosa Fitingov, who was then an assistant to one of Lenin's private secretaries, Lydia Fotieva. Rosa Fitingov was a Russian Jewish woman who joined the Communist Party in 1918. They married and had two children; a son named Gora and a daughter named Maya. Gora Mukerdzhi was killed fighting the invading Wehrmacht in the Battle of Stalingrad in 1942. His wife Rosa was later one of the founding members of the CPI and acted as M. N. Roy's interpreter.

== Publications ==
- Indian Labour Movement: A Review of the Situation, published in Communist Review, May 1922

== See also ==
- Anushilan Samiti
- Hindu–German Conspiracy
- Communist Party of India
