= Marxist Communist Party of India (United) =

Political party in India

- Abbreviation: MCPI(U)
- General Secretary: Maddikayala Ashok
- Founded: 2005
- Headquarters: Omkar Bhavan, 1-8-742/2/A, Bagh Lingampally, Achaiah Nagar, Hyderabad, Telangana, India 500044
- Student wing: All India Federation of Democratic Students
- Youth wing: All India Federation of Democratic Youth
- Women's wing: All India Federation of Democratic Women
- Labour wing: All India Centre of Trade Unions; All India Agricultural Workers Federation
- Peasant's wing: All India Kisan Federation
- Ideology: Communism; Marxism-Leninism
- Political position: Left-wing
- ECI status: Registered – Unrecognized

Website
- mcpiu.blogspot.com

Marxist Communist Party of India (United) - MCPI(U) is a communist party in India, formed in 2005 by the unification of the Marxist Communist Party of India, the Mangat Ram Pasla-led breakaway group from the CPI(M) in Punjab – Communist Party Marxist (Punjab), the BTR-EMS-AKG Janakeeya Vedi (a Kerala-based splinter group of the CPI(M), which had been based in the CITU) and the Hardan Roy group in West Bengal.

Jagjit Singh Lyallpuri was the general secretary of the party. On 26 November 2005, a meeting was held which appointed a 12-member Kerala State Committee with V.B. Cherian as its secretary. The Punjab state units of MCPI and Communist Party Marxist (Punjab) formally merged in December 2005 and a 13-member Punjab State Committee was appointed. Kuldip Singh is the secretary of the Punjab State Committee.

In September 2006, the unification congress of MCPI(U) was held in Chandigarh. 345 delegates from Punjab, West Bengal, Andhra Pradesh, Bihar, Rajasthan, Uttar Pradesh, Tamil Nadu and Kerala participated. The rally held ahead of the congress, which gathered around 5000 demonstrators, was addressed by Bhimreddy Narasimha Reddy, the chief commander of the Telangana armed struggle. The congress elected a control commission consisting of M.D. Gouse, N. Sudershan and Kirpal Singh Hans.
