= All India Federation of Democratic Youth =

All India Federation of Democratic Youth is the youth wing of Marxist Communist Party of India (United). Previously it was the youth wing of the main predecessor of MCPI(U), the Marxist Communist Party of India. They have taken up issues of the students and were active in the Northern Indian cities till 2010. They regularly used to observe the day of martyrdom of Bhagat Singh.
