= Karyattupuram =

Town in Kannur district, Kerala, India

Karyattupuram is a small town in Pattiam Grama Panchayath of Kannur district, Kerala, India.

== Location ==
Karyattupuram is situated at a distance of 5 km from the main town, Kuthuparamba. The town borders Naravoor Para, Muthiyanga, East Valliyayi and Koluthuparamb. There are around 50 shops on either side of the Kottayodi-Cheruvanchery Road, the main road passing through the town.

The Koluthuparamb-Karuattupuram and Pookod-Karyattupuram roads intersect the Kottayodi-Cheruvanchery road here. Two pedestrian and bicycle pathways, which are raised in some parts on account of flooding in rainy season, connect Karyattupuram to East Valliyayi, a neighboring agriculture-based village.

== Landmarks ==
A lower primary school, a community centre, the Cheruvanchery Agriculture Co-operative Bank and a civil supplies store function in the town.

== Transportation ==
The national highway passes through Kannur town. Goa and Mumbai can be accessed on the northern side and Cochin and Thiruvananthapuram can be accessed on the southern side. The road to the east of Iritty connects to Mysore and Bangalore. The nearest railway station is Kannur on Mangalore-Palakkad line. Trains are available to almost all parts of India subject to advance booking over the internet. There are airports at Mattanur, Mangalore and Calicut. All of them are international airports but direct flights are available only to Middle Eastern countries.
