= Marxist Communist Party of India =

- Abbreviation: MCPI
- General Secretary: Jagjit Singh Lyallpuri
- Founder: Jagjit Singh Lyallpuri Mohan Punamia
- Founded: 1983
- Dissolved: 2005
- Merged into: Marxist Communist Party of India (United)
- Student wing: All India Federation of Democratic Students
- Youth wing: All India Federation of Democratic Youth
- Women's wing: All India Federation of Democratic Women
- Labour wing: All India Centre of Trade Unions; All India Agricultural Workers Federation
- Peasant's wing: All India Kisan Federation
- Ideology: Communism; Marxism-Leninism
- Political position: Left-wing

Marxist Communist Party of India (MCPI) was a political party in India that formed in 1983 under the leadership of Mohan Punamia. It emerged as a splinter group of Communist Party of India (Marxist) stuck to the original 1964 programme. The party's general secretary was Jagjit Singh Lyallpuri (former All India Kisan Sabha general secretary).

MCPI was active in Andhra Pradesh, Bihar, Punjab, West Bengal, Rajasthan, Tamil Nadu, Uttar Pradesh, etc.

In 2005 by the unification of the Marxist Communist Party of India, the Mangat Ram Pasla-led breakaway group from the CPI(M) in Punjab – Communist Party Marxist (Punjab), the BTR-EMS-AKG Janakeeya Vedi (a Kerala-based splinter group of the CPI(M), which had been based in the CITU) and the Hardan Roy group in West Bengal formed Marxist Communist Party of India (United).

== Principal class mass organizations ==
- All India Centre of Trade Unions (AICTU)
- All India Kisaan Federation (AIKF)
- All India Agricultural Workers Federation (AIAWF)
- All India Federation of Democratic Youth (AIFDY)
- All India Federation of Democratic Women (AIFDW)
- All India Federation of Democratic Students (AIFDS)

Ahead of the 2004 Lok Sabha elections MCPI participated in the front initiated by Communist Party of India (Marxist-Leninist) Red Flag and Communist Party of India (Marxist-Leninist).

In 2005 MCPI merged with other splinter groups to form the Marxist Communist Party of India (United).

Lok Sabha election results:

- 2004: 4 candidates from Andhra Pradesh,
- 1999: 7 candidates from Andhra Pradesh, in total 120,220 votes
- 1998: 2 candidates from Andhra Pradesh, in total 24,417 votes
- 1996: 2 candidates from Andhra Pradesh, in total 33,900 votes
- 1991: 4 candidates from Andhra Pradesh, 1 from West Bengal, in total 43,085 votes
- 1989: 3 candidates from Andhra Pradesh, in total 100,300 votes

State assembly elections

- Andhra Pradesh 1999: 74 candidates, in total 132,601 votes
- Bihar 2000: 6 candidates, 8,861 votes
- Rajasthan 2003: 1 candidate, 2,111 votes
- Rajasthan 1998: 2 candidates, in total 542 votes
- West Bengal 2001: 1 candidate, 2,014 votes
