= Review of Indonesia =

Magazine published by the Communist Party of Indonesia

Review of Indonesia was an English-language monthly magazine published by the Communist Party of Indonesia (PKI). The magazine existed between 1954 and 1960. It was initially known as Monthly Review. It was launched in mid-1954. Monthly Review was mimeographed, but once it was relaunched as Review of Indonesia in January 1957 it was printed and illustrated.
