= All India Centre of Trade Unions =

Trade union in India

The All India Centre of Trade Unions is a trade union centre in India. It is the labour wing of the Marxist Communist Party of India (United). Previously it was the trade union wing of the main predecessor of MCPI(U), the Marxist Communist Party of India.

M.S. Patrudu was the AICTU general secretary until his death in 2004. Malkiat Singh then succeeded Patrudu as general secretary.

== Leaders ==
- K B Sharma
- Mahendra neh
- Mahendra Pandey
- V. V. Rajendran

== Mass organizations ==
- All India Centre of Construction Workers Federation (AICCWF)
- Desiya Nirmana Thozhilali union

== Important Actions ==
All India Centre of Trade Unions supported Bharat Bandh organised by Samyukt Kisan Morcha (SKM) marking the first anniversary of the three farm laws in Bengaluru in September 2021.
