= Satya Bhakta =

Indian revolutionary and political theorist

Satyabhakta
- Born: Chakhan Lal; 2 April 1897; Bharatpur, Rajputana, British Raj (present-day Rajasthan, India)
- Died: 3 December 1985 (aged 98); Mathura, Uttar Pradesh, India
- Occupations: Revolutionary, radical activist, political theorist, philosopher
- Political party: Jugantar, CPI, RDP
- Movement: Indian independence movement, Indian revolutionary movement

Satyabhakta (Hindi: सत्यभक्त) (2 April 1897 – 3 December 1985), was one of the founders of the Communist Party of India 25–28 December 1925 at Kanpur (then spelled Cawnpore). Satyabhakta was however indifferent to the traditional ideas of communism. He may also be referred to as a proponent of the Hindu left in India. His quote "the basic purpose of communism is to establish Ram Rajya on Earth" is a partial summary of his ideology.

== Biography ==
=== Early life ===
Satyabhakta's original name was Chakhan Lal. He was born in the Bharatpur district of Rajasthan in 1897. His father Kundanlal was the principal of the Middle School run by the princely state. He subscribed to the Bharat Mitra of Calcutta, which deeply influenced him. Satyabhakta came from a humble background and never accumulated wealth or property. He grew up reading revolutionary papers, and learnt about Khudiram Bose, Barindra Ghosh and Aurobindo Ghosh. He was also introduced to the weekly Satya Sanatan Dharma.

He married a Dalit woman, who was probably a widow.

He came under the influence of Ganesh Shankar Vidyarthi and his Pratap newspaper. He joined the underground revolutionary movement at a young age in 1912 or 1913, collecting explosives and making bombs. He did some reckless experiments with explosives, and one severed his finger. Consequently, he was under police watch for the next twenty years. He appreciated Sakharam Ganesh Deuskar's Desher Katha, Bankim Chandra Chatterjee's novel Anandamath, and Japan ka Uday.

=== Becoming a Gandhian ===
In 1916, he became a volunteer of the Servants of India Society during the Haridwar Kumbh Mela and got an opportunity to meet Gandhi. At that time, the Sabarmati Ashram had not yet come into being. The Society was operating from a village one mile away from Alice Bridge, Ahmedabad, out of a rented house. Satyabhakta went there and started doing menial jobs like filling water and running a flour hand-mill, while learning the Bangla and Gujarati languages at the same time. There he translated Gandhi's Sarvodaya and Jail ke Anubhav into Hindi. He came in contact with Gandhians like Kaka Kalelkar, Vinoba Bhave, Mahadev Desai and others. Gandhi wanted him to stay in the Ashram permanently but Satyabhakta had his own ideas and did not fully agree with the concept of Ahimsa etc. Staying there from 1918 to 1920, he attended Bombay session of the Congress. He began to write from 1916, his first article being life of Dhondo Keshav Karve, then several biographies, articles in nationalist papers such as Saraswati, Maryada, Hitkarini, Pratibha and others. He worked in Bhavishya of Sundarlal, coming in contact with leaders like Jawaharlal Nehru and Vijaya Lakshmi Pandit.

=== In contact with communism ===
While working in Maryada of Krishna Kant Malaviya, Satyabhakta joined the non-cooperation movement in 1921. Soon becoming disillusioned with Congress politics, he joined Rajasthan Seva Sangh. Then he came in contact with communist views and began to read about and appreciate the Russian Revolution. Satyabhakta corresponded with Sylvia Pankhurst, editor of Workers' Dreadnought, the newspaper of the Communist Party of Great Britain (CPGB). Through her, he received a lot of Marxist literature. At the beginning of 1923, he joined Radha Mohan Gokulji in his left-wing weekly called Pranveer from Nagpur.

He edited it for eight months and brought out its Independence Day special. He also attracted attention as a correspondent on writing about Shripad Amrit Dange. Towards the end of 1923, Satyabhakta returned to Kanpur and took part in workers' activities. There was a strike at the beginning of 1924 of workers at the Victoria Cotton Mills, lasting for one and a half months. Satyabhakta provided details of the strike in a letter to Dainik Vartman on 31 April 1924. He wrote that Mazdoor Sabha had collected two thousand rupees. He further wrote: "... there may be people in the Kanpur labor movement who believe in Communist or Bolshevik theories ...". The British government raised the bogeyman of Bolshevism to cover up its anti-communist acts such as the Kanpur Bolshevik Conspiracy Case, he said.

=== Idea of formation of CPI ===
He began to think in terms of forming a Communist party and convening an all India conference of Communists. Of course, many others in India, including Bombay Group, were thinking along similar lines. He announced an intention to set up an Indian Communist Party in the Hindi daily Aj of 12 July 1924. He referred to Russia and to the Communist rule there, asserting that Communism was the only path to uplifting unhappy and exploited people. He called upon all wage earners, peasants, workers, clerks, school masters, railway and postal employees, peons and others to join the party. He signed the letter as secretary of the Bhartiya Samyawadi Dal (Hindi: 'Indian Communist Party'). His announcement appeared in the English-language daily Indian World. In September 1925, Satyabhakta published two 4-page leaflets, in Hindi and English, titled Indian Communist Party, with a membership form printed at the end. The objects of the party were defined as the "establishment of complete swarajya and a society based upon common ownership ... of the means and instruments of production and distribution". He called for the abolition of the zamindari system, and stated that working people must organize themselves, and that the party would work to change the present system. The government of the United Provinces banned both these pamphlets by a notification in the gazette of 11 October 1924. Satyabhakta protested against it with a letter to Vartman in Kanpur on 20 October 1924: "It is cowardice of the government to ban the rules of the party without declaring the party itself illegal." He was a Communist, and would face all of the consequences. In Aj on 5 November 1924, he reiterated, "we have the right to organize a communist party." He said that the Congress had not defined swaraj, changes in social order have not been clarified, and the National Congress was strongly under the influence of rich people. Communists wanted to eliminate the difference between the rich and the poor. He quoted Lenin on this question. The British government closely watched his activities, raided his house and his socialist bookshop several times and confiscated publications. His name was originally included among the 13 people selected to be prosecuted in the Kanpur case, but it was dropped for want of evidence.

Pranveer published the first quarterly report of the Indian Communist Party in a brief letter signed by Satyabhakta as secretary. He mentioned that party had 78 members by that time, mostly in Kanpur, and Madhya Pradesh and Rajasthan. Prominent members were: Maulana Hasrat Mohani, Narayan Prasad Arora (MLC), Rama Shankar Awasthi (Editor, Vartman), Radha Mohan Gokulji, Ram Gopal Vidyalankar (Editor, Pranveer), etc. Satyabhakta was in contact with the revolutionary organization HSRA, though not agreeing with everything. In the raid on his office, police seized copies of Volunteer and Revolutionary, organs of HRA in UP. In October 1924, Satyabhakta wrote a 16-page pamphlet Bolshevism Kya Hai ('What is Bolshevism') in question-answer form. Mukut Bihari, editor of Swadesh, was arrested in Gorakhpur while selling the pamphlet. Satyabhakta strongly protested, and Bihari was released in March 1925. A second quarterly report of the Indian Communist Party was published in March 1925, which claimed a membership of 215, including 139 from UP. The same month, Shapurji Saklatvala, a CPGB member and MP, communicated with Satyabhakta. A leaflet issued by Satyabhakta (18 June 1925) titled "The Future Program of the Indian Communist Party", mentioned for the first time that an Indian Communist conference would be held at the same time as Congress session in Kanpur at the end of 1925. Police again raided his bookshop on 7 July 1925 and seized CPGB literature. Hindustan Times of 16 July 1925 reported with the heading 'Communist Party: police raid uncalled for, secretary explains'. Satyabhakta commented that India has been reduced to the level of a prison. The police and British intelligence suspected that the Communist Party set up at Kanpur by Satyabhakta was a direct result of Hindustan Republican Association, with himself as figurehead. In his documents, Satyabhakta tried to provide aims, objects and programs of the communist party more clearly.

=== Response to call for party ===
S. V. Ghate recorded that after Kanpur case, the Socialist Group of Bombay had considered forming a party. In the meantime, they came across Satyabhakta's announcement, and decided to join the Kanpur conference. JP Bagerhatta also decided to do the same. KN Joglekar records that he and the Bombay Group learned of it through VH Joshi, who was going to meet SA Dange in Kanpur Jail. He wrote: "We, the Bombay Group, gave support to the idea and decided to participate in as large a number as possible." Joglekar said that Satyabhakta was helpful to the defence committee in Kanpur Conspiracy Case. Muzaffar Ahmed wrote that Satyabhakta contacted him through letter in Almora requesting participation in Kanpur Communist conference. Muzaffar Ahmed reached Kanpur and found Ghate, Joglekar, Nimbkar etc present. The initiative of Satyabhakta and others met with a positive response not only from Bombay and Bengal but also from Punjab and Madras.

Thus, according to Ghate, the work of bringing together the Communist groups at Kanpur was done by Satyabhakta. Satyabhakta formed a committee and got help from Ganesh Shankar Vidyarthi and his paper 'Pratap'. Vidyarthi was a leftist and helped the Communists.

As is well-known, the Kanpur foundational conference of CPI was a success. The 'Indian Communist Party' of Satyabhakta was dissolved and a formal Communist Party of India was founded. Satyabhakta wrote that he did not feel any dissatisfaction about this.

=== Differences and departure from CPI ===
Satyabhakta was elected to the Central Executive Committee (CEC) formed at the Kanpur conference. He soon developed differences with the rest of the party, particularly on the question of internationalism, and resigned from the CEC. Later he left the party, though remained a sympathetic nationalist. There had already been a certain divergence of views between him and the other CPI members at Kanpur on the nature of the party, which he had initiated. This led to his gradual divergence from the Communist movement. In Satyabhakta's perception, it should have been an Indian Communist Party rather than a Communist Party of India. To him, it was not just a question of name but of the whole approach. He said he was not opposed to the Communist International (Comintern) and favoured friendly relations with it, but believed that the party should not be tied to it.

Satyabhakta published the first number of his eight-page Hindi fortnightly Samyavadi on 1 January 1926 after the conference. He wanted to publish it at the time of the conference but could not. It contained articles by Malayapuram Singaravelu, Maulana Azad Subhani and Radha Mohan Gokulji, besides articles on Russia and Lenin. Both its initial numbers were seized by the British police. His book 'Agle SaatSaal' (next seven years) was also banned and seized.

He later on worked in various Hindi journals like 'Chand', 'Pranveer', etc but had to leave them. He gradually became a destitute. He joined a spiritual ashram in Mathura in 1941 and other places, but he continued writing. He wrote about hundred small biographies of prominent Indian and foreign historical figures. He also wrote the history of Indian freedom movement from 1857 to 1947. He joined 'Akhand Jyoti Ashram' but never participated in their daily prayers and 'aarti' etc. He continued to believe in his own interpretation of communism.

Even 46 years after the events, he made it clear that he had no quarrel with the workers of the CPI.

=== Death ===
Satyabhakta died on 3 December 1985 as a destitute in the Ashram, nearing the age of 90.

== Writings ==
- साम्यवाद का संदेश (The message of Communism), 1934
