= Peshawar Conspiracy Cases =

Set of 5 legal cases from 1922 to 1927 in British India

The Peshawar Conspiracy Cases were a set of five legal cases which took place between 1922 and 1927 in British India. The muhajirs, a group of Muslims, were inspired by communist revolutions and went to the Soviet Union for training in 1920. Some of them returned to India in 1921 from Tashkent to incite a revolution. British intelligence got information about it from their foreign office and the police arrested the first batch of revolutionaries and sent them away to a sham trial.

The defendants in these cases had sneaked into British India from the Soviet Union to allegedly foment a proletarian revolution against British colonial rule. The colonial government feared that the defendants were entering India with the intention of spreading socialist and communist ideas and supporting the emerging independence movement.

It was not the only case which became popular and galvanized the imagination of the young population of the Indian subcontinent. Similar such cases included the Kanpur Bolshevik Conspiracy Case of May 1924.

== See also ==
- Communist Party of Pakistan
- Kanpur Bolshevik Conspiracy Case
- Meerut Conspiracy Case

== Bibliography ==
- Salim, Ahmed (2016). "Freedom Movement and Peshawar Conspiracy Cases". Pakistan Perspectives. 21 (1): 29–48.
