= Mangat Ram Pasla =

Indian politician

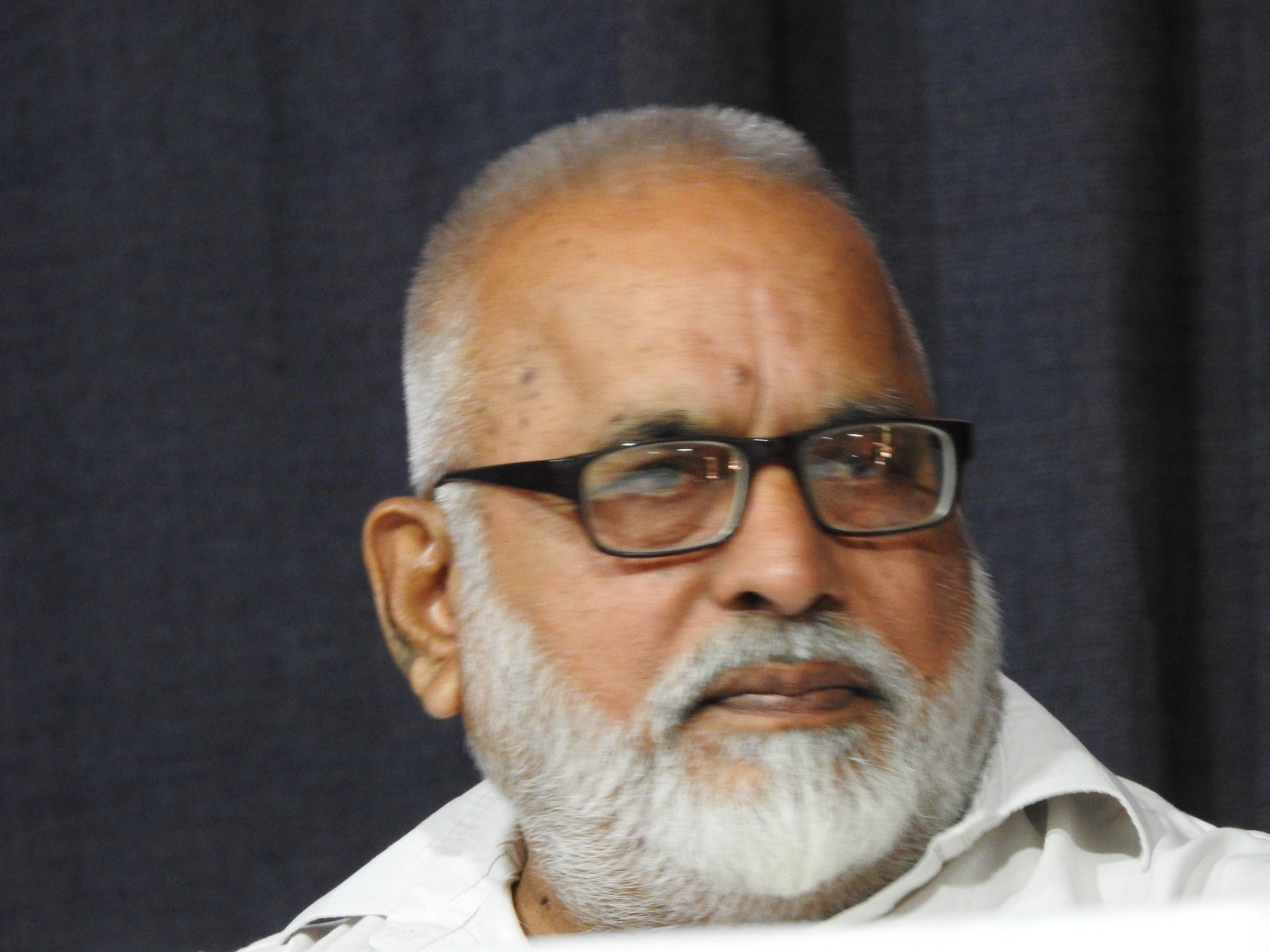
Mangat Ram Pasla

Mangat Ram Pasla is an Indian politician. He was a Central Committee member of the Communist Party of India (Marxist), but was expelled from the party in December 2001. He had previously been the Secretary of the Punjab State Committee of the party. Pasla was one of the most prominent leaders of CPI(M) in the Doaba belt. He was also the General Secretary of the Punjab unit of the Centre of Indian Trade Unions.

The expulsion of Pasla came a day after he had announced the holding of a parallel state conference of the CPI(M) in Punjab. Tensions between Pasla's group and followers of the CPI(M) general secretary Harkishan Singh Surjeet had simmered in the Punjab unit of CPI(M) for some time. Pasla's group had accused the party of abandoning the 1964 party programme. On elections, Pasla argued in favour of maintaining the policy of equidistance to parties like the Indian National Congress and the Bharatiya Janata Party.

After the expulsion from CPI(M), Pasla's group continued to work under the name " Communist Party Marxist (Punjab)". Pasla was the secretary of the committee. He was also the vice president of the Centre of Trade Unions (CTU), Punjab.

Later when Communist Party Marxist(Punjab) and other small parties merged and formed Revolutionary Marxist Party of India (RMPI), Pasla became the General Secretary of RMPI.
