= BTR–EMS–AKG Janakeeya Vedi =

Communist party faction

BTR–EMS–AKG Janakeeya Vedhi (BTR-EMS-AKG People's Forum) was a political group in the South Indian state of Kerala, a splinter group of Communist Party of India (Marxist). The group was led by expelled CITU-leader V.B. Cheriyan. In 2005 the group merged into the Marxist Communist Party of India (United). In the 2004 Lok Sabha elections BTR–EMS–AKG Janakeeya Vedi had formed a joint front with Communist Party of India (Marxist-Leninist) Red Flag.

== Popular culture ==
Long live EMS, AKG and Soundariya, as Puchalapalli Sundarayya is chanted by a man in the Oru Thekkan Thallu Case

== See also ==
- B.T. Ranadive
- E. M. S. Namboodiripad
- A.K. Gopalan
