= Labour Kisan Party of Hindustan =

Political party in British India

- Leader: Singaravelar
- Founded: 1 May 1923
- Dissolved: 26 December 1925
- Merged into: Communist Party of India
- Headquarters: Chennai
- Ideology: Socialism

Labour Kisan Party of Hindustan was a political party in India. The party was founded by Singaravelu Chettiar on 1 May 1923 in Madras. This was the first May Day celebration in India. This was also the first time the red flag was used in India.

Singaravelar made arrangements to celebrate May Day in two places in 1923. One meeting was held at the beach opposite to the Madras High Court; the other meeting was held at the Triplicane beach. The Hindu newspaper reported,

The Labour Kisan Party has introduced May Day celebrations in Madras. Comrade Singaravelar presided over the meeting. A resolution was passed stating that the government should declare May Day as a holiday. The president of the party explained the non-violent principles of the party. There was a request for financial aid. It was emphasized that workers of the world must unite to achieve independence.

Singaravellar announced that it would join the Indian National Congress and would strive to function as the labour and farmer wing of that party. In the manifesto of the party Singaravelar described Congress 'our chief political organ, appear to define "nation" by referring to propertied class'. Singaravelu was critical that the Indian National Congress was dominated by landlord and capitalist interests.

Labour Kishan Party of Hindustan was a part of a larger, but not inter-connected, move by various Indian communist groups to find a mass-based political platform. The party was joined by S.A. Dange and the communist group in Punjab. Dange had initially expressed reservations on the LKPH and its programme drafted by Singaravelar, but once the party had been formed he joined it.

In December 1923, Chettiar started a fortnightly journal called The Labour Kisan Gazette. Chettiar also started the Tamil Weekly Thozhilalar in which he wrote about the working class movements spreading in various parts of the world during the early part of the 1920s.

Singaravelu announced the dissolution of the party at the 1925 Kanpur conference of the Communist Party of India.
