= Malayapuram Singaravelu =

Freedom fighter and one of the founding member of Communist Party of India

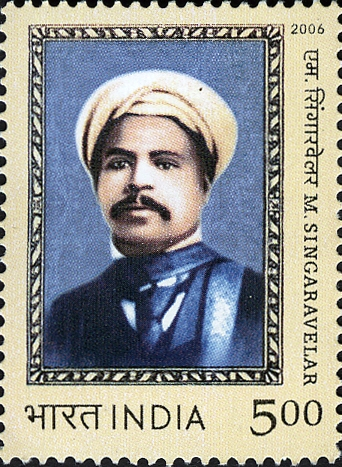
- Born: 18 February 1860; Madras, British India
- Died: 11 February 1946 (aged 85); Madras, British India

Malayapuram Singaravelu (18 February 1860 – 11 February 1946), also known as M. Singaravelu and Singaravelar, was a pioneer in more than one field in India. In 1918, he founded the first trade union in India. On 1 May 1923 he organised the first ever celebration of May Day in the country. Singaravelar was a major leader of the Indian independence movement, initially under the leadership of Gandhi, but later, joining the budding communist movement. In 1925, he became one of the founding fathers of the Communist Party of India, and chaired its inaugural convention in Kanpur. Though the British Government arrested him along with other leaders on charges of conspiring to wage war against the Crown, he was set free soon after, on account of his failing health. Singaravelar was also a path-breaking social reformer who in his early life took to Buddhism, seeing it as a weapon against the evil of untouchability, which was particularly severe in the 19th-century India. He was also at the forefront of Self-Respect Movement, in the Madras Presidency that fought for equal rights for backward castes. Though in his advanced years, he withdrew from active politics, Singaravelar remained a staunch advocate of the causes he had pioneered till his death at the age of 85.

== Early life ==
Singaravelar was born into a pattanavar chettiar family, the third son of Venkatachalam and Valliammai in Madras (now called Chennai). He matriculated in 1881 and then, from Madras Christian College, he passed F.A. (First examination in Arts) in 1884. Singaravelar took his bachelor's degree from the Presidency College under the Madras University. He joined the Madras Law College and got his Bachelor of Laws degree in 1907. Thereafter Singaravelar practised law at the Madras High Court.

In 1889, Singaravelar married Angammal. Their only daughter was Kamala. Seetha, his grand-niece, married Philip Spratt in 1939. Singaravelar was successful as a lawyer; within a short period, he earned enough wealth to acquire estates in Madras town and suburbs.

=== Singaravelar and Maha Bodhi Society ===
Around this time, Singaravelar had shown growing willingness to combat social evils such as untouchability. The leading voice of the oppressed classes at the end of the 19th century was Iyothee Thass (also referred to as Pandit C. Ayodhya Dasa and Iyothi Thass) (1845–1914). He was born into a fisherman family (most backward caste) and had concluded that rationalist ideas of Buddhism could be used as a weapon against untouchability. He and other oppressed class people from Tamil Nadu decided thence forth to call themselves Buddhist, and live accordingly. In 1890 he started Sakya Buddhist Society and later in 1900, South Indian Buddhist Association in Madras. Influenced by Iyothee Thass, Singaravelar also became growingly open to Buddhist ideas.

Anagarika Dharmapala, the Ceylonese Buddhist missionary founded the Maha Bodhi society for revival of Buddhism in 1891. Iyothee Thass and Col. Olcott of the Theosophical Society, Adyar in Madras, wanted to convene a meeting on Dharmapala's arrival in Madras. The meeting that took place on 8 August 1898 was held at Royapettah house of Singaravelar. Later on 28 September the Madras branch of the Maha Bodhi Society was inaugurated in the presence of a large gathering. At this meeting a resolution was moved by Singaravelar to form, in Madras, the first branch of the Maha Bodhi Society. Much later, in 1923, when Singaravelar issued the manifesto of his newly formed Labour and Kishan Party of Hindusthan, he signed it as 'M. Singaravelu (Indian communist) President, Madras Maha Bodhi Society'.

== Singaravelar and early labor movement ==
In the history of working class movement in India, Madras came to occupy an important place when, within six months of the Russian Revolution, Singaravelar, on 27 April 1918, formed the first trade union in India, called the Madras Labor Union of the British-owned Buckingham & Carnatic Mills. Chettiiar became its first president. Singaravelar and other activists of the period, like Thiru Vi Ka (Tamil for 'Mr. V. K.' – standing for Mr. V. Kalyanasundaram) organised more unions such as M.S.M. Workers Union, Electricity Workers Union, Tramway Workers Union, Petroleum Employees Union, Printing Workers Union, Aluminium Workers Union, Railway Employees Union, Coimbatore Weavers Union and Madurai Weavers Union.

From their inception trade unions in Madras were drawn into long, and often bloody, confrontations with the management. According to the noted economist Amiya Kumar Bagchi:

Madras had led the trade union movement with the organisation of workers into Madras Labour Union, but the movement could not flourish in a region with abundant labour, slow industrial growth and employees who were determined not to make any concession to labour organisations.

Buckingham & Carnatic Mills workers' strike is a case in point. The management of the Mills did not even concede workers right to combine. The union was banned by the British authorities. A flash point occurred when a British manager threatened workers with a gun, which was snatched by workers and started firing back. The police came and opened fire killing two young workers.

Singaravelar, Thiru Vi Ka, and other leaders called for a strike on 21 June 1921. The management retaliated by instigating a caste war through recruitment of workers from 'low' castes to fill the strikers' vacancies. The strike turned into a caste war between two warring groups. On 29 August 1921, police firing near the Mills' premises in Perambur, near Madras, killed seven people. When their funeral procession was taken out some miscreants threw stones, leading to another round of caste violence. Two more firings – on 19 September and 15 October 1921 followed. After six months, the strike came to an end, failing to meet any of its objectives. From then Singaravelar started seeking political backing for the working class movement.

Aluminium workers in Madras struck work in July 1922. Singaravelar speaking in Tamil Nadu Congress Committee meeating in September 1922 said that the Indian National Congress should take up the cause of labour. Later he led a strike of workers of Addisons press. In December 1922 he was in the forefront of Madras Tramways workers strike. Singaravelar also presided over the strike of 30 August 1924 by the scavengers of Madras Corporation.

=== Singaravelar's contact with émigré communists ===
Singaravelar attracted the attention of the émigré Communist Party of India, which was founded by M. N. Roy, Shaukat Usmani and others in Tashkent on 17 October 1920. Describing the formation of earliest communist groups in India, S. A. Dange is quoted as below:

The Tashkent Party (ie. CPI) and the Executive Committee of the Communist International tried to build contacts independently and through me with communist group in Calcutta led by Muzaffar Ahmed and the group in Madras led by M. Singaravelu.

Abani Mukherji, a close associate of M.N. Roy, smuggled himself to India from Moscow via Berlin in December 1922 and surreptitiously met local communist leaders. After meeting Dange at the Gaya session of the Congress in December 1922, and meeting Bengal communist groups, Mukherji moved to Madras and met Singaravelar. Mukherji helped him with his efforts to form Hindustan Labour Kishan Party and also to draw up its manifesto. Earlier Singaravelar had met Dange at the Gaya session of the Congress.

== Singaravelar and the Congress ==
When Mahatma Gandhi launched the non-cooperation movement starting from September 1920 to February 1922, Singaravelar accepted Gandhi's leadership and became one of the influential leaders of the Presidency Congress Party. He set fire to his lawyer's gown at a public meeting in May 1921 as symbolic of boycotting the British courts. In May 1921, he wrote a letter to Mahatma Gandhi explaining his action, "I have given up my profession as a lawyer today. I shall follow you as you strive for the people of this country."

An important event of the period was the visit of Prince of Wales and his consort to India. When they came to Madras, Singaravelar organised the boycott of the delegation through an unprecedented hartal or complete shutdown of shops and establishments of the town. The shutdown was complete, but there were instances of compulsion.

Gandhi in an article in Young India, dated 9 February 1922 criticized the hartal and Singaravelar for not imbibing the true spirit of non-cooperation movement. He quoted a letter from one of his disciples, Dr. Rajan:

Just two days ago, Mr. Singaravelu Chettiar, president Madras District Congress Council, held a public meeting on the Madras beach. The first resolution congratulated the citizens of Madras on their successful hartal and the second resolution condemned the excesses committed that day.

I wired to Mr. Singaravelu not to have this ugly meeting but evidently no notice seems to have been taken of it

Gandhi's comment on the passage was:

The confession, therefore, that Dr. Rajan has made is an invigorating process. It strengthens him and the cause for which he stands. Non-co-operation is a vicious and corrupt doctrine, truly an "ugly" word, if it does not mean down-right self-purification. Stubborn and implacable resistance against internal corruption is enough resistance against the Government.

=== Singaravelar in Gaya congress convention ===
When the Indian National Congress met in Gaya, in 1922, Singaravelar participated, seeing himself as a representative of workers. He spoke in favour of labour legislation and felt that the labour movement in India must be a part of the congress movement. M. N. Roy praised him for calling himself a communist, in Vanguard dated 1 March 1923:

That Singaravelu participated in the Gaya Congress Meeting in which people with different ideas took part will be considered a historic event. When many leaders were afraid that their honour and respect as important leaders will be lost and young men were afraid of the steps that the government would take, this sixty-year-old grey-haired elder called him a communist". It is impossible not to praise him.

The theme of his speech was that "it is necessary approach the workers personally and make Trade Unions a part of the Congress." Following his speech, the Gaya meeting adopted the Labor Resolution that said:

It is the opinion of this conference that all Indian Labourers should be united. To safeguard their rights and prevent their exploitation and for equal distribution of wealth among all, the various labour and kisan unions should be unified and for this purpose, a committee of six has been constituted.

=== The first May Day in India ===
On 1 May 1923, Singaravelar founded the Labour Kishan Party of Hindusthan (party of workers and peasants) in Madras. The foundation ceremony was purposefully kept on the May Day; and for the first time in India, under the auspices of the newly formed party, the day was observed as International Workers' Day. On that occasion, again for the first time the red flag was used in India. Singaravelar made arrangements to celebrate the May Day in two places in the One meeting was held at the beach opposite to the Madras High Court; the other was held at the Triplicane beach. The Hindu newspaper, published from Madras reported:

The Labour Kisan party has introduced May Day celebrations in Chennai. Comrade Singaravelar presided over the meeting. A resolution was passed stating that the government should declare May Day as a holiday. The president of the party explained the non-violent principles of the party. There was a request for financial aid. It was emphasised that workers of the world must unite to achieve independence.

=== Labour Kishan Party of Hindusthan ===
Labour Kishan Party of Hindusthan was a part of a larger, but not inter-connected, moves by various Indian communist groups to find a mass-based political platform. Dange, for instance, wrote to M. N. Roy of the émigré Communist Party of India and a leader of the Comintern, regarding his desire to start a Socialist Labour Party of India. In reply, Roy explained the relation between émigré Communist Party of India and 'mass party of revolutionary nationalist struggle' and further said that "each of the Indian "centres" produced a separate scheme and it was some time before they could agree to combine." Roy was probably referring to Singaravelar's proposal to start a similar party. Same year Dange wrote in his journal Socialist that all his activities were now a part of the Labour Kishan Party of Hindusthan and he asked for opening up of its branches everywhere.

Singaravelar announced that it would join the Indian National Congress and would strive to function as the labour and farmer wing of that party. Labour Kishan Party was a precursor to Workers and Peasants Party of 1925 that would function within the Congress, as a left wing platform for the same. In the manifesto of the party Singaravelar described Congress 'our chief political organ, appear to define "nation" by referring to propertied class.

In December 1923 Singaravelar started a fortnightly journal called The Labour Kisan Gazette. Singaravelar also started the Tamil Weekly Thozhilalar in which he wrote about the working class movements spreading in various parts of the world during the early part of the 1920s.

In 1925, Singaravelar was elected as a member of the Madras Corporation. On Singaravelar's initiative, the first ever Midday Meal Scheme was introduced in Madras for providing cooked meals to children in corporation schools.

== Formation of Communist Party of India ==
In the Gaya congress session of 1922, the president of the session, C. R. Das moved a resolution for 'Council-Entry programme,' that is, 'Non-Cooperation from within the Councils.' He however met with vehement opposition from the Mahatma and the 'no-changers'. C. Rajagopalachari led the Council-Entry opposition. The resolution lost. M. N. Roy wrote:

It has been proved at Gaya, if proof were still needed, that the National struggle can be led, neither by the reactionary petty-bourgeoisie acting through the orthodox "No-Changers" under the divine guidance of St. Rajagopal, nor by the radical intellectuals desirous of harking back to the folds of Constitutionalism, under the guise of loyalty to the memory of Tilak. Between these two centripetal forces, Bengal's "Sentimental Tommy" (C. R. Das) croaked. Before he could wreck the Councils, the Councils wrecked him. What is to be done? A new party must be organised.

Early communists like Dange, Singaravelar, M. N. Roy's associate, Abani Mukherji, a deportee from Fiji and a lawyer Manilal Doctor were present at the Gaya session and saw Gandhi's support to the 'no-changers.' Efforts to form a unified platform intensified. On 29 January 1923, Dange wrote to Singaravelar that:

You perhaps know that Roy wants to hold a conference of Indian Communists in Berlin. I think it is a mad venture Indians to go hunting Communism in European Conference, whatever has to be done must be done in India.

=== Kanpur Bolshevik Conspiracy case ===
In January 1924, the government of India compiled a brief on activities of communists in India. The Government Counsel recommended prosecution against the first eight in the list, namely, M. N. Roy, Muzaffar Ahmed, Shaukat Usmani Gulam Hussain, S. A. Dange, Singaravelu, Ramcharan Lal Sharma, and Nalini Gupta. But no recommendations were made against S. D. Hussain, M. P. T. Velayudham (an associate of Singaravelar), Sampurnand, Manilal Doctor, and Satya Bhakta. The report was submitted to the Governor General and on further legal scrutiny some lacunae were found. The scope of the case was revised to bring in a conspiracy angle: that the Third Communist International had appointed Roy as its agent and had instructed him to establish a communist party with the help of Shaukat Usmani, S. A. Dange, Singaravelu, Gulam Hussain, and Muzaffar Ahmed.

As the charges were getting framed Dange and Singaravelar were arrested under Regulation III of 1918 that allowed detention without trial in August 1923. Subsequently, Muzaffar Ahmed (Calcutta), Shaukat Usmani (Kanpur) and Gulam Hussain (Lahore) were arrested. On 20 December 1923 Nalini Gupta was also arrested under the same regulation. Roy evaded arrest since he was abroad. Ramcharan Lal Sharma was not arrested because he had migrated to the French territory of Pondicherry due to police harassment.

On 17 March 1924 cases were framed against the accused in what was called the Cawnpore (now spelt Kanpur) Bolshevik Conspiracy case. The specific charge was that they as communists were seeking "to deprive the King Emperor of his sovereignty of British India, by complete separation of India from Britain by a violent revolution." Out of the six accused in custody only four—S. A. Dange, Shaukat Usmani, Muzaffar Ahmed and Nalini Gupta—were produced. Singaravelar, now 64, was confined to bed due to illness. He was later released on bail. Gulam Hussain was pardoned after he confessed that he had received money in Kabul.

The case attracted interest of the people towards Comintern plan to bring about violent revolution in India. Communist trials had taken place in India, in frontier towns like Peshawar where Russian trained Muhajir (Urdu-speaking people) communists were put on trial. "But no case had attracted public gaze like the Kanpur case. Pages of newspapers daily splashed sensational communist plans and people for the first time learned such a large scale about communism and its doctrines and the aims of the Communist International in India." Names of accused like S. A. Dange, Muzaffar Ahmed, Shaukat Usmani, and Singaravelu Chettiar came to be recognised across the country.

=== First communist conference ===
In 1924, shortly after the Kanpur Conspiracy Case, Satyabhakta, a Congress worker in the United Provinces had decided to organise a 'legal' Communist Party, that is, a party that would not attract treasonable charges such as in the Kanpur case. Initially no significant notice was taken of Satyabhakta's venture, but when Nalini Gupta was released from the jail (July 1925) and later when Muzaffar Ahmed was released in September on grounds of poor health, their interest fell on Satyabhakta's party for organizational work—in the absence of any other structure. Satyabhakta then announced a communist conference in DeMarxistcember 1925, at Kanpur, to be concurrently held with Indian National Congress convention. His idea was to demarcate himself from the existing communist groups. N. N. Roy was skeptical when he wrote in the October 1925 issue of his magazine,Masses of India that:

It is premature to say that what shape this 'Communist Party' will ultimately assume and how far it is going to be Communist in Programme and actions.

The conference was held on 25–26 December 1925. Singaravelu Chettiar was elected to preside over the session. The meeting adopted a resolution for the formation of the Communist Party of India. According to the Constitution, the object of the Party was, to quote:

establishment of workers' and peasants' republic based on socialisation of means of production and distribution, by the liberation of India from British imperialist domination.

The British government's extreme hostility towards communists, made them to decide not to openly function as a communist party; instead, they chose a more open and non-federated platform, under the name the Workers and Peasants Parties.

== Singaravelar and railway employees' strike ==
Employees of various railway systems in India, the North-Western Railway, Bengal Nagpur Railway, and The East Indian Railway went on to strike demanding better working conditions and for better treatment by the management.Singaravelar went on a tour to north India to extend his support to the striking railway employees. In February 1927, he reached Bhopal and met the striking workers. In Howrah and Bengal, 30,000 workers were on strike. Singaravelar along with a group of workers from Madras State also took part in the strike.

=== South Indian Railway Strike ===
After returning from his North Indian tour Singaravelar was drawn into another railway employees' strike. In 1927, the workers of the South Indian Railways were resisting measures by the management to retrench them through a fresh assessment of their skills. Also the management had decided relocating employees working in different railway workshops to one near Tiruchirapalli(Trichy). The workers demanded the withdrawal of both these measures. When the management refused to accede to their demands, the workers went on strike from 19 July 1928. All the railway employees, irrespective of their seniority, joined the strike. From 21 July 1928, the trains were stilled.

The strike eventually failed. Singaravelar along with a prominent leader of the strike, Sakkarai Chettiar, and a number of employees were arrested. Singaravelar was sentenced the ten years imprisonment, which was reduced to 18 months on appeal.

== Singaravelar and the self-respect movement ==
The statue of Singaravelu Chettiar, on the side of a busy street in Puducherry.

Singaravelar felt that E. V. Ramasamy's self-respect movement (that advocated for upliftment of intermediate castes and opposing upper castes viz. the brahmins) and the communist movement should work together to save the Tamil labour forces from the clutches of both religious and economic exploiters. This appealed to periyar and he published Singaravelar's contributions in his magazine,Kudiyarasu. In 1931, Periyar undertook a journey to Soviet Union and other European countries. On his return, he invited Singaravelar to Erode for discussions. Periyar convened a meeting of the movement at his residence on 28–29 December 1932, and drew out what was called the Erode Plan. Periyar had taken a decision to support pro-British Justice Party and to oppose the Indian National Congress in the elections that followed. Unlike Congress, the Justice Party had agreed to implement a policy of appointments to government jobs in proportion to caste ratios, as demanded by the leaders of the self-respect movement.

Significance of Singaravelar's association with the self-respect movement is brought out by Karthigesu Sivathamby, a prominent Tamil scholar from Sri Lanka who has closely studied the social movements in Madras province,

By this time the rationalist movement, through its association with the world socialist movement, was becoming more scientific. It was not merely rationalism in the Ingersolian sense. It was becoming more and more scientific... promotion of socialism, and so on. And this is seen in the immediate tie-up of M. Singaravelu Chettiar and Periyar.

== Bibliography ==
- Ralhan, O. P. (1997). Communist Party of India. Anmol Publications. ISBN 8174883010.
- Murugesan, K.; Subramanyam, C. S. (1975). Singaravelu, first communist in South India. People's Pub. House. ISBN 9780883867143.
