= Magic in India =

Indian magic history

A traditional Indian street magician

Stage or street magic has a long history in India. Popular tricks include the rope trick, Indian basket, and Indian cups and ball.

== Ancient history ==
The Latin term Magi was used to refer to Zorastrians during ancient times. The performance of magic and its practice is historical and very ancient. There would be definite yet varied purposes for the practice of magic which evolved where entertainment, tricks, deception, illusion, cheating in games, and fun may have been aimed. Sometimes, in religious context and purpose, it meant to offer social education along with some kind of preaching and healing too. The practice of Magic started to become evident around the beginning of the 18th century in India, and eventually the nation would present some distinct magicians in later years. West Bengal, Kerala, Karnataka, Gujarat, Delhi, Mumbai, Andhra Pradesh and some other parts of India have produced few great magicians so far.

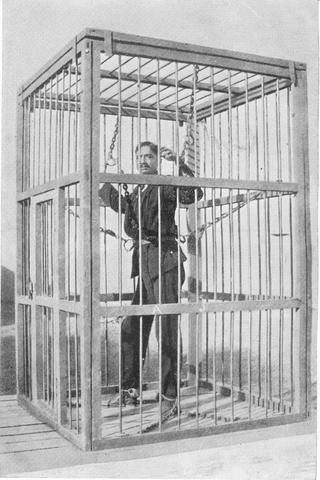
Indian magician Ganapati Chakraborty in his famous act of 'Kangsha Karagar'

In ancient times, Indian magicians were often considered to be workers of legitimate mystical miracles, not simply entertainers. According to John Zubrzycki, writer of Empire of Enchantment: The Story of Indian Magic, the history of Indian magic goes back to the 3500 BC old Harappan Civilisation. There has been evidence showing that people back then used charms, amulets and talismans. There has also been evidence of Indian fortune tellers dating back to Roman Empire. The Indian Magic was brought into the west in the 1813 by an English Captain of a ship who offered a group of jugglers in Madraes a great reward for their performance across the Black Sea. The general reputation of Mohammed Chhel, born in 1850 in Ningala, Bhavnagar, Gujarat is notable in the magic world. Very popular regionally, he was considered a Mystic. Chhel did not generally venture into stage shows and commercial performances. His target audience remained peasants, simple - ordinary people, villagers, train passengers and such a class of society. With his performance/acts he often intended to convey some message of life to people, and he would strive to extend with his acts/magic for the benefit of deprived people. There are also several other popular magicians and their groups in Gujarat, such as K Lal, Pro. Chudasama, and few others.

The grandfather of Kerala's magic is Vazhakunnam Neelakandan Namboothiri. He played an important role in bringing magic as an art. Born in 1903, he learned magic after having watched some tricks shown in his Illam by one Mundaya Eachara Varier. Vaazhakunnam later became famous for Kayyothukkam, although occasionally he performed also "Cheppum Panthum" (cups and balls) to small family gatherings. After 1940 he started real stage performances with his troupe. The shows also included short dance programmes, comedy skits, etc.

== Notable illusions ==
There is some evidence that the aerial suspension illusion originated with an Indian Brahmin. The most well-known magical illusion connected with India is the Indian rope trick. Other routines include the cups and balls, Indrajal, X-Ray Eyes, Waters of India, Blindfold Ride, a water escape as practiced by Houdini and feats of sleight of hand.

== Notable magicians from India ==
- B.S.Reddy
- P.C. Sorcar
- O.P. Sharma
- K Lal
- P.C. Sorcar, Jr.
- Gopinath Muthukad
- Prahlad Acharya
- Chanchal Lahiri. He died after attempting a Harry Houdini trick in the Ganges River on 16 June 2019.
- Gogia Pasha
- Suhani Shah
- P.C. Sorcar, Young
- Maneka Sorcar

== See also ==
- Magic (illusion)
- Maya (religion)
