= P. C. Sorcar =

Indian magician (1913–1971)

Protul Chandra Sorcar
- P. C. Sorcar
- Born: 23 February 1913; Tangail, Mymensingh, Bengal Presidency, British India (now in Dhaka Division, Bangladesh)
- Died: 6 January 1971 (aged 57); Asahikawa, Hokkaidō, Japan
- Occupation: Magician
- Spouse: Basanti Devi
- Children: 3 sons, Manick Sorcar, P. C. Sorcar Jr., P. C. Sorcar, Young
- Relatives: Piya Sorcar, Maneka Sorcar, Moubani Sorcar, Mumtaz Sorcar (grandchildren)

Protul Chandra Sorcar (23 February 1913 – 6 January 1971) was an Indian magician. He performed internationally throughout the 1950s and 1960s. He has been called the "Father of Modern Indian Magic." He is also known as P.C. Sorcar Senior, since his son, P.C. Sorcar Jr. also performs under that name. He is also regarded as the Maharaja Of Magic or Jadusamrat ("The Emperor Of Magic")

== Career ==
At the age of 21, Sorcar decided to give up formal education and decided to become a conjuror despite the profession's low esteem in India.

Sorcar became famous in the mid-1930s, when he performed shows in Kolkata and also in Japan and several other countries. Among other routines, he performed a Floating Lady routine featuring aerial suspension in 1964. P. C. Sorcar's world-famous 'Indrajal' shows were supported by a highly skilled technical team.

In 1956, he performed the sawing a woman in half illusion on the BBC's Panorama program, causing some members of the public to panic.

He called himself "The World's Greatest Magician".

Sorcar died in Japan in 1971, suffering a massive heart attack while exiting the stage at the end of a performance.

== Awards ==
=== National Honor ===
- India
  - Padma Shri (1964)

=== Other Recognitions ===
- Jadusamrat P.C. Sorcar Sarani The Government of India has named a major street in Calcutta after him
- The Sphinx Prize (Oscar of Magic), US, 1946 and 1954
- The Royal Medallion (1956), for the World's Greatest Magician by the German Magic Circle
- GOLD MEDAL, awarded by Aleksander Voloshin, Principal of the Soviet Circus College, Russia, Soviet Union, 1962

== Postage stamp ==
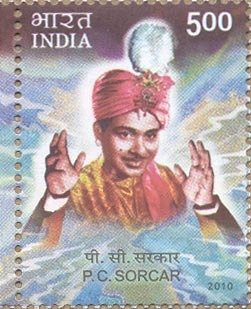
Sorcar on a 2010 stamp of India

On 23 February 2010, India Post issued a commemorative stamp to honour him.

== Publications ==
- Magic for You (1966)
- More Magic for You (1965)
- History of Magic (1970)
- Indian Magic (1983)

== See also ==
- Indian magicians
