= Kuda Bux =

Indian mystic and magician (1905–1981)

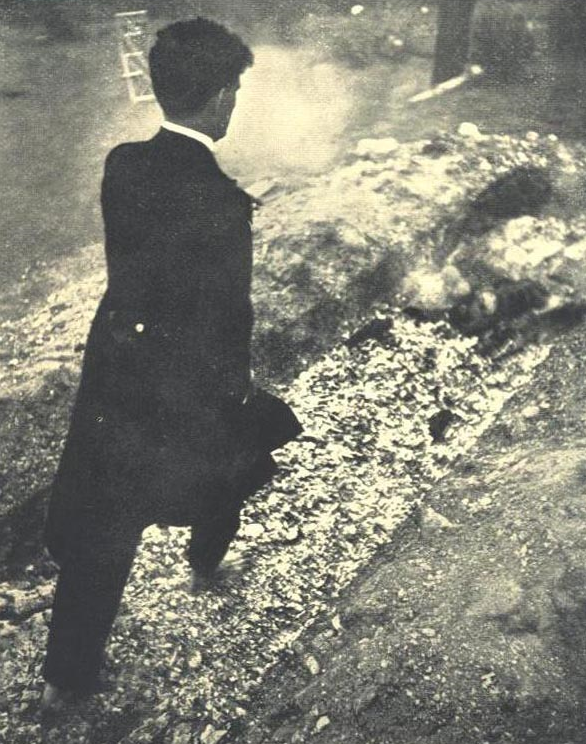
- Kuda Bux walking on hot coals in 1935
- Born: 15 October 1905; Akhnoor, Jammu and Kashmir, British India (present-day Jammu and Kashmir, India)
- Died: 5 February 1981 (aged 75); California, USA
- Other name: Professor K.B. Duke
- Occupation: Magician

Kuda Bux (15 October 1905 – 5 February 1981, born Khudah Bukhsh) was a Kashmiri magician and firewalker.

== Early life ==
Khudah Bukhsh was born in Akhnur, in the princely state of Jammu and Kashmir in 1905, to a wealthy saffron-growing Kashmiri family of land-owners. When he was thirteen, he ran away from his home to learn magic from a performer named Professor Moor. After a few months, he joined a theater group as a magician. Three years later, Kuda went to Haridwar to study with a yogi. He pretended to be religious to be accepted as a disciple. The yogi taught Kuda to train his subconscious mind, which is how he claimed to be able to perform all of his feats.

== Career ==
Kuda Bux was a skilled magician with a seven-decade career. His first job was attracting audiences for Professor Moor by performing the linking rings. Bux was a deft card magician and was described as "a genius with silks". He generated publicity for his performances by seeking the scrutiny of scientists.

In the early 1930s, he moved to Bombay, took on the name 'Professor K.B. Duke' and began working as a blindfold artist. In 1935, he moved to London, where he performed Indian magic tricks, and became known for 'X-Ray eyes' and firewalking. By the mid-1930s, he arrived in the United States where he worked steadily as a magician. He was also known as DareDevil or The Man Who Can See Without His Eyes. In the 1950s, he had a short-lived TV show called Kuda Bux, Hindu Mystic.

He eventually lost his eyesight to glaucoma. Early in her career, Joan Rivers traveled to Sainte-Anne-de-Beaupré with Kuda to perform as his assistant. They did the Indian basket trick, and Kuda sawed her in half. After Rivers started telling jokes during the illusions, Kuda fired her. The Magic Castle gave him a Performing Fellowship in 1970. In his old age, he was a nightly regular at the Castle where he would play cards with magicians Dai Vernon and Hy Berg. He died in 1981 in his sleep, aged 75.

=== Blindfolds ===
In one of his best known performances he would cover his eyes with soft dough balls, blindfold himself, swath his entire head in strips of cloth, and yet still be able to see. While blindfolded he would read the dates on coins which were held in a spectator's hand, read the fine print of a magazine, thread a needle while covered in a wine barrel, duplicate words he had never seen written, shoot a can on children's heads with a pellet gun and do many other tricks. Bux once cycled with his eyes covered along Broadway in New York City.

Over the years, Bux gave differing accounts about how the trick worked. He told researcher Harry Price that he used his nostrils to see. He once said any piece of exposed skin was all he needed to perform the trick and read The Life of Samuel Johnson from behind a door with his hand. Fellow magician John Booth wrote that Bux was a dedicated showman who made a point of using reading glasses when he was not onstage. Booth befriended his colleague when he was a regular at the Magic Castle.

Roald Dahl wrote a non-fiction story about Bux's blindfold routine for Argosy in 1952. Twenty-five years later, he changed Bux's name to Imhrat Khan and kept the bulk of his Argosy report intact as the framed story in "The Wonderful Story of Henry Sugar".

=== Firewalking ===
In 1935, Bux walked over hot coals in front of an audience of scientists from the University of London Council for Psychical Research and news reporters. On September 9, he made a test walk across a 25x3x1-foot trench. Bux felt the trench was too shallow and narrow. Eight days later, the trench was twice as wide but 3 inches shallower. Bux's feet were checked before and after the firewalking demonstration to verify that no protective chemicals, topical creams or herbs were used. It was a very windy day and the surface temperature of the fire was over 800 degrees Fahrenheit (427 degrees Celsius). The September 17th stunt was photographed and filmed. Time reported that Bux wept when he was asked to repeat the walk a third time and refused to do it.

Bux repeated his firewalk at NBC Radio City Studios in Manhattan on 2 August 1938. A three-foot-deep (0.91 m) hole was dug in the Radio City parking lot. Wooden logs and bags of charcoal were set on fire in it. Bux took four steps across the pit before exiting halfway across. After Bux walked through the coals, a cameraman who had missed some of the stunt asked for a retake. Bux obliged by repeating the firewalk. Again, his feet were checked before and after the firewalking demonstration. Robert Ripley said, "Kuda Bux's feet were not even warm." There is newsreel footage of this event in the TV biography The Incredible Life and Times of Robert Ripley: Believe It or Not!. It was the last time Bux would perform the stunt.

Harry Price suggested that the feat was performed by specific placement of the feet. Just days after Bux's 1935 walk, Joseph Dunninger gave a more logical explanation to his Universal Council for Psychic Research. He pointed out that charcoal cools rapidly, and it also has a protective layer of ash. By walking quickly on it, one could avoid being burned. Dunniger reminded his audience that firewalking is an old Japanese trick known as "hai-wattari" (火渡).
