= Piya Sorcar =

American social entrepreneur and researcher

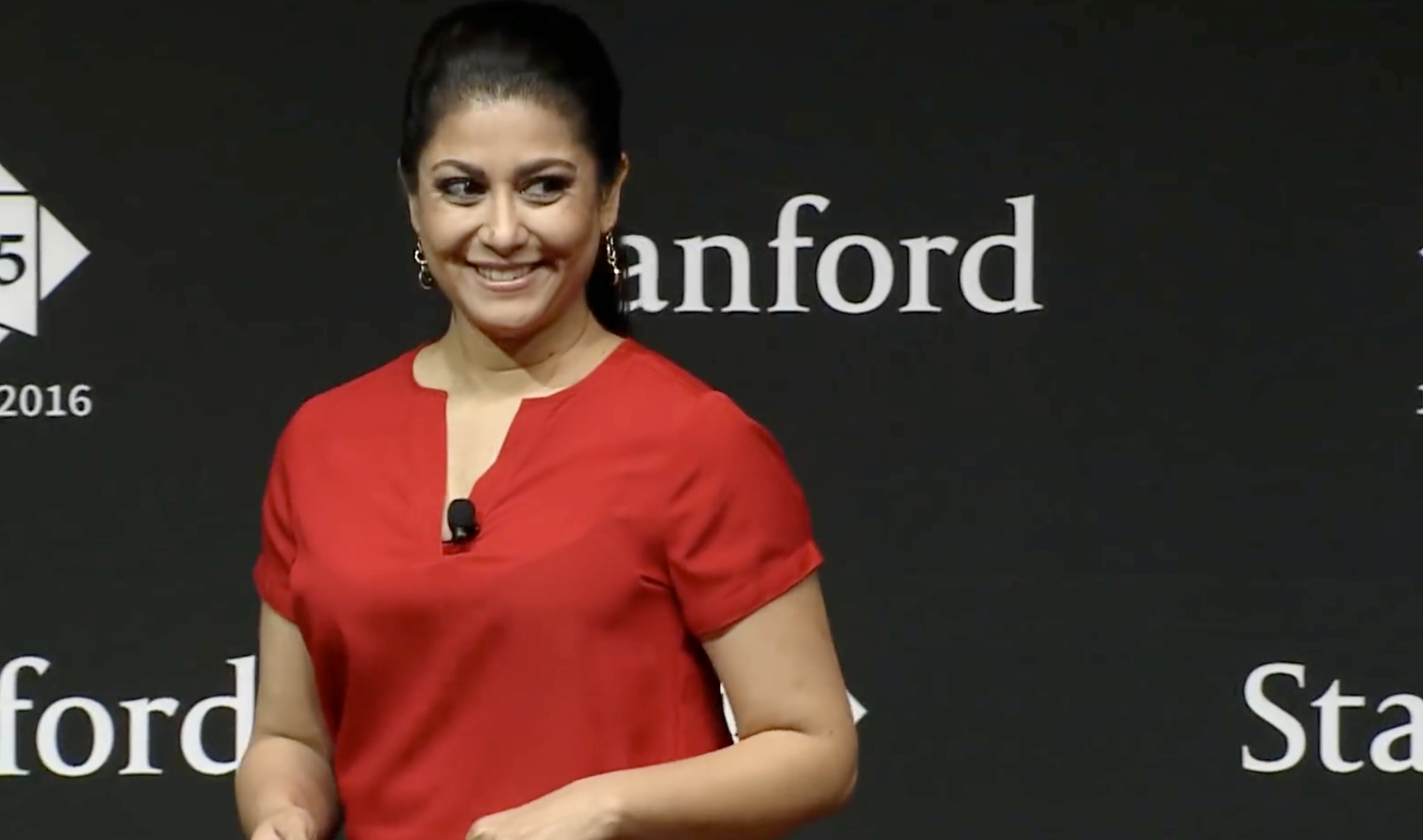
- Sorcar at Stanford University in 2015
- Born: 1977 (age 48–49); Denver, Colorado, United States
- Education: University of Colorado (BA, BS, BS); Stanford University (MA, PhD)
- Occupations: Founder & CEO, TeachAids; Lecturer, Stanford University
- Spouse: Shuman Ghosemajumder
- Parent(s): Manick Sorcar, Shikha Sorcar

Piya Sorcar (born 1977) is an American social entrepreneur and researcher. She is the founder and CEO of TeachAids, and a lecturer at Stanford University.

== Background ==
Sorcar was born in Denver, Colorado, with Indian ancestry, the eldest daughter of artist and engineer Manick Sorcar and Shikha Sorcar, and the granddaughter of the pre-eminent magician P. C. Sorcar and Basanti Devi. As a child actor, she was nominated for a regional Emmy Award for her performance in the short film Deepa & Rupa: A Fairy Tale from India, directed by her father, which went on to win at the Chicago International Film Festival.

== Career ==
She moved to California around the 2000s, and began the development of TeachAids at Stanford University, where it was the focus of her doctoral research. In 2009, she founded it as a nonprofit partnered with the university, working with a team of interdisciplinary experts for five years. Her research efforts developed a new approach to large-scale public HIV education which overcame taboos to vastly improve learning and usage rates.

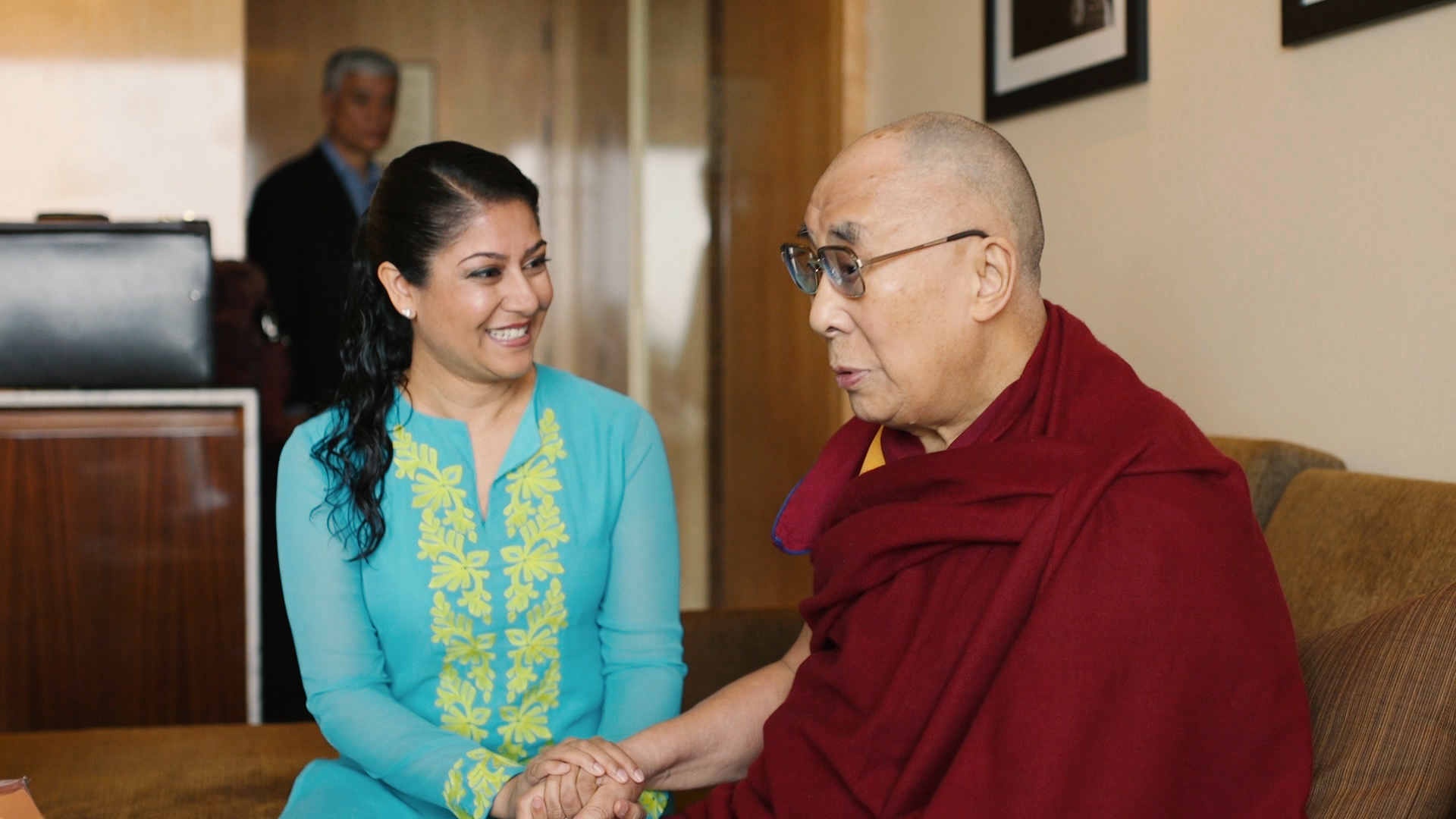
Sorcar in conversation with the Dalai Lama in 2015

The approach Sorcar created included combining 2D cartoon images (balancing clarity with comfort), a research-based translation and back-translation process, mnemonic devices, and voices of regionally-specific cultural icons, among other inventions.

She has led TeachAids to produce many versions of its interactive HIV prevention software, which are now used in more than 80 countries. Her work has included directing Bollywood actors Amitabh Bachchan, Shabana Azmi, Shruti Haasan, and Nagarjuna.

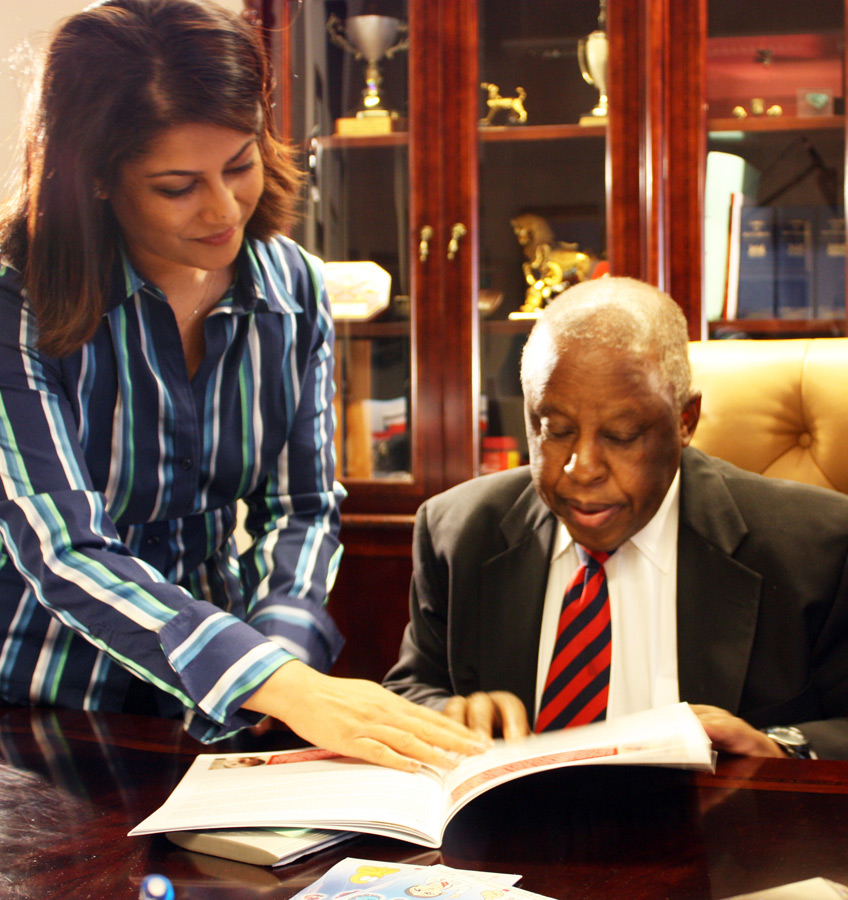
Sorcar with President of Botswana, Festus Mogae launching TeachAids in Botswana in 2010

In 2018, she led the creation of a second TeachAids initiative for concussion education called CrashCourse, using a new pedagogical approach based on virtual reality, and supported by Steve Young, Dick Gould, Jim Plunkett, Katie Ledecky, and other prominent sports figures. The initiative partnered with 23 United States Olympic & Paralympic Committee Sports Governing Bodies. Demonstrating high efficacy levels through research conducted at Harvard University and Stanford, CrashCourse was used globally, particularly in Canada, Great Britain, and the United States.

In 2011, MIT Technology Review named Sorcar to their TR35 list of the top 35 most innovative people in the world under 35. In 2012, she and TeachAids were named one of twelve global laureates of The Tech Awards. In 2022, she received the Public Service Award from the Association of Academic Physiatrists, joining past winners such as Christopher Reeve.
