= Mumtaz Sorcar =

Indian actress (born 1986)

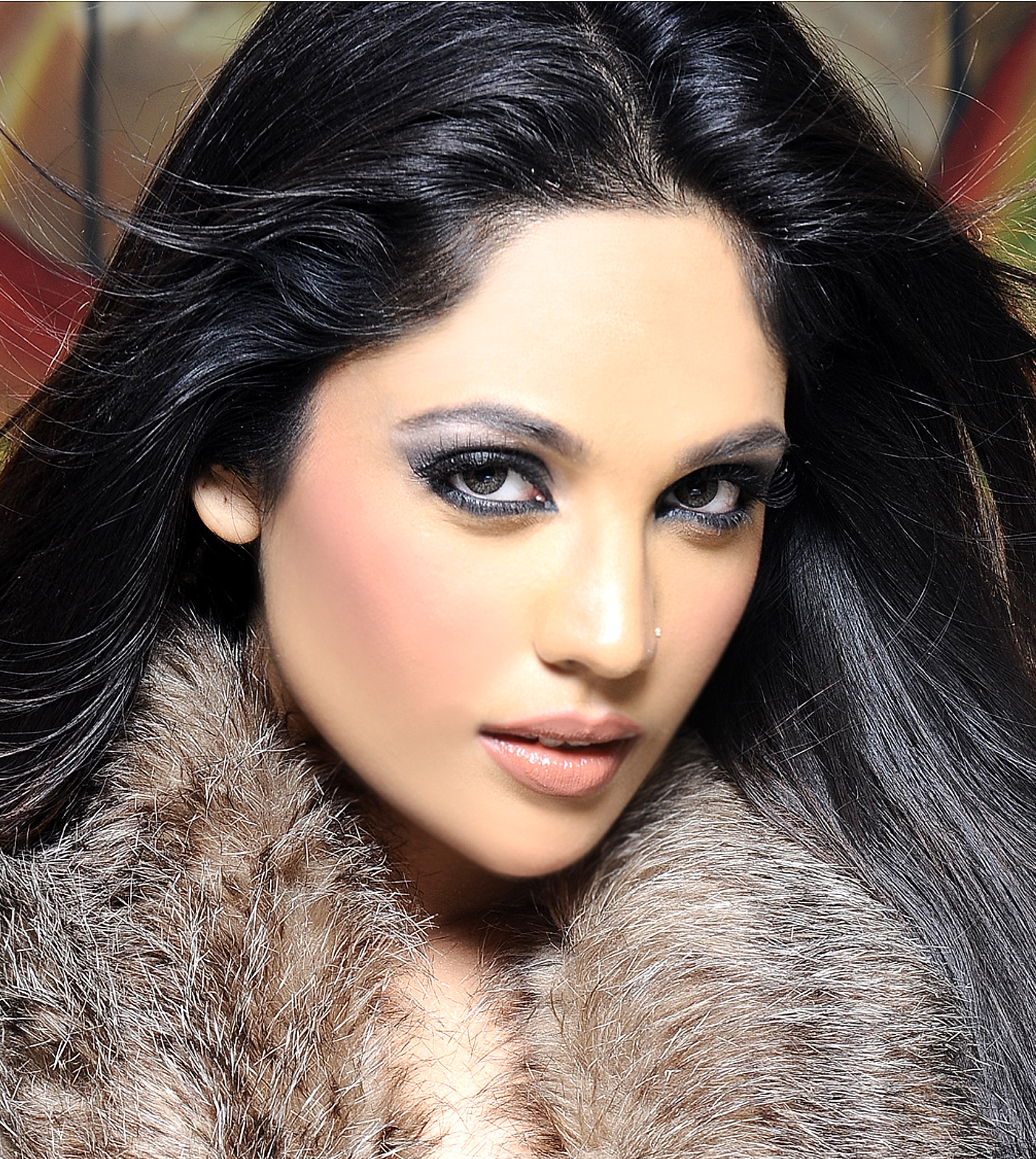
- Sorcar in 2011
- Born: Mumtaz Sorcar; 15 September; Kolkata, West Bengal, India
- Other name: Mumtaz
- Occupation: Actress
- Years active: 2009–present
- Parent(s): P. C. Sorcar Jr. Joysri Sorcar

Mumtaz Sorcar (born 15 September) is an Indian actress who works primarily in the Bengali cinema. She is the daughter of the magician PC Sorcar Junior and Joysri Sorcar. Her first major role was in the 2010 film 033. In addition to Bengali cinema industry, she has also starred in various roles in Bollywood and Tamil cinema.

== Personal life ==
Her schooling was from Modern High School for Girls, Kolkata. She completed her LLB from South Calcutta Law College under Calcutta University. Her hobby is playing sports and as an athlete, she was trained in boxing at a South Kolkata Club under the auspices of the Bengal Amateur Boxing Federation. She also underwent training in judo and is a YMCA gold medalist in shot put. Mumtaz is also a classical jazz dancer.

== Career ==
Her debut film was 033, which was directed by Birsha Dasgupta. She appeared in Shoumik Sen's No Problem in the initial days of her film career. She appeared in multiple Bengali films thereafter.

She played a pivotal role in the Bengali film Musalmanir Galpo. She played a Hindu girl "Kamala", who was abducted by a notorious dacoit "Madhumallar" and she later transformed into a courageous "Meherjaan" after being rescued and trained by philanthropist Habir Khan. The film is based on the last story written by Rabindranath Tagore wrote. Sorcar's next film was 033. It is about a group of youngsters who form a music band and name it after the city's STD code (033).

In 2011, she acted in the telefilms Kolkatar Jongole and Rajbarir Rahasya, which are based on the Kakababu series, written by Sunil Gangopadhyay. Bhooter Bhabishyat (2012) was a box office success. Her next film Kanchenjunga Express is about a character "Nandini", who works for a NGO and is married 3 times and dies under mysterious circumstances. She also appeared in the film Atmogopan directed by Somnath Sen.

Sorcar played the role of Payal Mukherjee in the film Dark Chocolate. She made her Tamil debut with Irudhi Suttru, where she played the role of Lakshmi (Luz), a young female boxer. She made her Bollywood debut in the same role for the Hindi dub of Irudhi Suttru titled Saala Khadoos.

In the Tamil movie C/O Kaadhal, Sorcar played the role of a Muslim girl Salima, where the film shows that love has no age and one can fall in love anytime if they meet the right person. She also appeared on the TV series Charitraheen and web series Shobdo Jobdo streaming on Hoichoi.

== Filmography ==
Key
†	Denotes films that have not yet been released

=== Films ===
Year	Film	Role	Language	Notes	Ref.
2009	Ek Bar Bolo Uttam Kumar	Bobby	Bengali		
2010	033	Ria	Bengali		
2010	Musalmanir Galpo	Kamala/Meherjaan	Bengali		
2011	Kolkatar Jongole	Debolina	Bengali		
2011	Rajbarir Rahasya	Debolina	Bengali		
2011	Shindukh Rahasya	Debolina	Bengali		
2012	Bhooter Bhabishyat	Koel Dhar	Bengali		
2012	Kanchenjunga Express	Nandini	Bengali		
2012	Koyekti Meyer Golpo	Shaoni	Bengali		
2012	Sudhu Tomake Chai		Bengali	credited as Mumtaz	
2012	Kolkata 2012		Bengali	Unreleased	
2013	Atmogopan	Anu	Bengali		
2013	Meghe Dhaka Tara	Supriya Devi	Bengali		
2013	Half Serious	Tania	Bengali		
2013	Nayika Sangbad	Anuradha	Bengali		
2013	The Play	Ishika	Bengali		
2013	Ashchorjyo Prodeep	Mala Maal	Bengali		
2015	Not A Dirty Film		Bengali		
2015	Chitrahar @ Cinema Noy Ganema		Bengali		
2016	Irudhi Suttru	Lakshmi "Lux"	Tamil		
2016	Dark Chocolate	Payal Mukherjee	Bengali		
2016	Nayikar Mato	Rani	Bengali		
2016	Teenanko		Bengali		
2016	Saala Khadoos	Lakshmi "Lux"	Hindi		
2017	Guru	Lakshmi "Lux"	Telugu		
2017	Life in Zero	Kuhu	Bengali		
2017	Raktokorobi	Nandini	Bengali		
2018	Jole Jongole		Bengali		
2019	Maya: The Lost Mother	Manabi	Bengali (Bangladesh)		
2021	C/O Kaadhal	Salima	Tamil		
2022	Shabaash Mithu	Jhulan Goswami	Hindi		
2023	Samaresh Basu-r Projapoti	Shikha	Bengali	credited as Mumtaz	
2024	The Red Files	Priti Rao IPS	Bengali		
2024	Putul	Bheli	Bengali		
2026	Battle of Chhuriyaan †	Jinsa	Hindi	Post-production	

=== Web series ===
Year	Film	Role	Language	Notes	Ref.
2019	Charitraheen 2	Nirupama	Bengali	Hoichoi	
2020	Charitraheen 3	Nirupama	Bengali	Hoichoi	
2020	Shobdo Jobdo	Sulagna	Bengali	Hoichoi	
2022	Tasveer	Annie	Bengali	Mukti Prime	

== See also ==
- P. C. Sorcar
- Maneka Sorcar
- Moubani Sorcar
