= Manick Sorcar =

Indian American film director

- Born: 29 November 1944 (age 81); Tangail, Mymensingh, Bengal Presidency, British India (present-day Dacca Division, Bangladesh)
- Education: Indian Institute of Technology, BHU, University of Washington
- Occupations: Artist, animator, laserist, engineer
- Spouse: Shikha Devi
- Children: Piya Sorcar, Payal Sorcar
- Parent(s): P.C. Sorcar, Basanti Devi
- Website: www.manicksorcar.com

Manick Sorcar (formal name Prafulla Chandra "P.C." Sorcar) is an Indian American artist, animator, engineer, and laserist. Sorcar is an artist in various media, including fine arts, cartoons, animations, laser arts, and world-touring stage shows with live action mixed with laser animation. His animated films, all based on children's stories from India, have won prestigious awards at international film festivals and been broadcast on the Public Broadcasting Service for 25 consecutive years. His laser arts and animation in various forms have won global awards from the International Laser Display Association.

== Early life and background ==
Sorcar was born on 29 November 1944. He is the eldest son of legendary Indian magician, the late P.C. Sorcar and Basanti Devi. He has two older sisters, Ila and Gita, and two younger brothers Prodip and Provas, both of whom are magicians. He is married to Shikha Devi and has two daughters, Piya and Payal.

In his youth, Sorcar was a stage assistant for his father's world-touring magic shows, where he also painted backdrops and designed the stage lighting. He chose not to pursue magic as a career as he was more interested in lighting and art, in which he also saw forms of magic.

After receiving his bachelor's degree in electrical engineering (first class) from the Indian Institute of Technology, BHU, he wanted to see more of the world and came to the United States to pursue higher education in lighting technology and to practice art. He earned his master's degree in electrical engineering from the University of Washington.

== Career ==
=== Engineering ===
Sorcar started his professional career as an engineer at Howard W. Butterweck and Company, an electrical consulting engineering firm in Denver, Colorado. After two years, he became a partner, and the firm changed its name to Butterweck-Sorcar Engineering, which later became Sorcar Engineering. Over the course of 40 years under Sorcar's leadership, the company flourished, and completed numerous multimillion-dollar projects, including the Denver International Airport, the Colorado Convention Center, and several sport centers in Japan and Saudi Arabian palaces. During this time, Sorcar authored three widely-used books on lighting design, used as textbooks in US and Indian universities.

=== Laser art and animation ===
Sorcar first shot to fame in the nineties when his Deepa & Rupa: A Fairy Tale from India, India's first animation mixed with live action, received the Gold Plaque at the Chicago International Film Festival in 1990 and was nominated for an Emmy Award in 1991, and The Sage and the Mouse won the Gold Medal at the International Film Festival of New York in 1993. Other animated films he created include The Woodcutter’s Daughter, which was a finalist at the International Film Festival of New York; Sniff (Gandha Bichar), which received the Golden Eagle from CINE; and The Rule of Twenty-One, which won the Bronze Plaque at the Columbus International Film Festival.

Starting in 1999, he began to create new forms of animation using lasers as a medium. His Calcutta Forever: A Laser Fantasy was recorded as the first laser-documentary screened inside a movie theater. In 2000, he received the Excellence in Art Plaque from the National Federation of Indian American Associations in New Jersey, for his laser shows Dancing with My Soul and India Forever. Hosted by the Indian Consulate General of San Francisco for India's 61st Republic Day celebration on 26 January 2010, his laser documentary Our Republic's Birth, which captured India's history starting from 3300 BCE to its independence from the British and proclamation as a Republic Dominion was shown at the historic Palace of Fine Arts in San Francisco, California.

In 2012, he produced Swamiji, an hour-long laser documentary on Swami Vivekananda, which was praised by the critics, Ramakrishna Missions and Vedanta Societies around the world for its accurate depiction of Swami Vivekananda's life. The Ramakrishna Math and Ramakrishna Mission, Belur Math, Howrah, India said "It was as if he was painting the events of Swamiji's life with a paintbrush before our eyes. It was fascinating." about the show which took place on 31 January 2014 at Belur Math campus, attended by 15,000 people.

== Filmography ==
- Deepa & Rupa: A Fairy Tale from India (1990)
- The Sage and the Mouse
- The Woodcutter’s Daughter
- Sniff (Gandha Bichar)
- The Rule of Twenty-One
- Calcutta Forever: A Laser Fantasy (laser documentary)
- Our Republic's Birth (2010) (laser documentary)
- Swamiji (2012) (laser documentary)

== Honors and awards ==
Sorcar is a three-time winner of the ILDA Artistic Award from the International Laser Display Association and is also the first Indian American to ever win this award. He first won in 2006 for his Enlightenment of Buddha, which mixed live-performance with life-size laser animation and three-dimensional visual effects on stage and won the First Place at the 2005 International Laser Display Association award contest. His second win was in 2008, for the laser photography of his laser-art Reflection, which won First Place for laser photography at the 2007 ILDA award contest. His third win was for the innovative application of lasers in his production Light Art in Shower Ocean, which won first place at the 2015 ILDA contest. His 2017 laser animation, Beautiful Mess, won an Award of Merit at the Accolade Global Film Competition.

Sorcar has received a number of honors, including the Bharat Samman Achievers Award at the XXI Annual Meet NRI Divas 2011 of the NRI Institute in New Delhi. In 2011, Jadavpur University opened the Manick Sorcar Laser Animation Laboratory. Sorcar donated laser lab equipment worth more than US$100,000 and introduced the first laser animation course at the university as a special application of lighting for degrees in illumination engineering.

On 6 November 2013, at Aalen, Germany, he was bestowed with the Special Achievement Award for Cultural Enlightenment from the International Laser Display Association for exceptional merit in using laser display to celebrate India's heritage, and to prepare the next generation by introducing a course on laser art and animation and establishing the Manick Sorcar Laser Animation Laboratory at Jadavpur University.

On 24 May 2014, at New Delhi, India, he received the IIT-BHU Alumni Lifetime Achievement Award for Outstanding Contributions in the Field of Cultural and Enlightenment through Science and Arts.

In 2015, during the Silver Jubilee celebration for the 25th anniversary of his animation broadcast on PBS, the Governor of Colorado John Hickenlooper congratulated Sorcar by writing:

"For a quarter of a century, your animation films have taken children on a special journey to the lands of India where they have learned more of her culture and people. These films have taught that diversity is an asset and what brings us together is our common thread of humanity irrespective of where we grow up...your work continues to make Colorado, the United States, and India proud."

== See also ==
- P. C. Sorcar
- List of Bengalis
- List of Indian Americans
- List of people from Kolkata
