= Ek Bar Bolo Uttam Kumar =

2009 Indian Bengali film

- Directed by: Chinmoy Roy
- Starring: Parambrata Chatterjee; Mumtaz Sorcar; Soumitra Chatterjee; Sabitri Chatterjee; Diganta Bagchi
- Music by: Som Dasgupta
- Release date: 10 December 2009
- Country: India
- Language: Bengali

Ek Bar Bolo Uttam Kumar (transl. Tell me once Uttam Kumar) is a 2009 comedy Bengali film directed by Chinmoy Roy. The film stars Parambrata Chatterjee, Mumtaz Sorcar, Soumitra Chatterjee, Sabitri Chatterjee, Piyali Munshi and Diganta Bagchi. This film is Chinmoy Roy's directorial debut and that of magician PC Sorcar Junior's youngest daughter Mumtaz Sorcar.

== Plot ==
The film is about Kyabla (Parambrata Chatterjee), who lives in the slums, and falls for rich girl Bobby (Mumtaz Sorcar). Bobby loves Prem (Diganta Bagchi) and hates Kyabla. But Kyabla, who is obsessed with Uttam Kumar's films, won't give up easily.

The film is a funny take on the love triangle. The title Ekbar Bolo Uttam Kumar was a dialogue director Chinmoy Roy told in his starring film Basanta Bilap; it was an instant hit. "Besides, this is my way of paying tribute to Uttam Kumar," said the actor-turned-director.

== Music ==
Ekbar Bolo Uttam Kumar has eight songs composed by Som Dasgupta. Shreya Ghoshal is the star voice.
