= Swamiji (film) =

- Directed by: Manick Sorcar
- Screenplay by: Manick Sorcar
- Based on: Life of Swami Vivekananda
- Starring: Anindya Basu; Subhamoy Ganguly; Agni Obin Basu; Hemanta Mukherjee; Ravi Singh; Payal Sutton; Benjamin Sutton; Raja Bhattacharjee; Ritwik Bhattacharjee
- Narrated by: Shuman Ghosemajumder
- Music by: Sourabh Basak; Manick Sorcar; Anindya Basu (singer); Durga Rahul (singer)
- Production companies: Basanti Studio; Studio Six
- Distributed by: Manick Sorcar Productions
- Release date: 10 October 2012
- Running time: 56 minutes (laser documentary); 75 minutes (with prayer/Vandana)
- Country: India
- Language: English

Swamiji is a 2012 laser show and documentary film directed and produced by Manick Sorcar. Based on the life story of Hindu monk Swami Vivekananda (1863–1902), it is the first laser documentary made on an individual and the first full-length laser documentary ever to be shown in a performing arts center.

The documentary was produced on a budget of $125,000, utilizing eight color lasers, LED lights, smoke and haze machines, video projectors, a surround sound system, donated voice talent, song, animation modeling, and animation drawn by Manick Sorcar. The laser show was preceded by a Sanskrit prayer to the Holy Trio (Paramhansa Ramakrishna, Sarada Devi, and Swami Vivekananda), and 'Vandana', based on a composition of Swami Vivekananda in Bengali. The prayer and Vandana were live performances in combination with laser animation and atmospheric effects. In total, combined with the 56-minute laser documentary, the show had a running time of 75 minutes.

Critics, Ramakrishna Missions and Vedanta Societies around the world praised the documentary for its accurate depiction of Swami Vivekananda's life. The production was shown in dozens of cities in India and the United States.

== Plot ==
The documentary begins with a slide show of an old pictorial book displaying black and white original scenes of 1893 World's Columbian Exposition, Chicago and Swamiji at the Parliament of the World's Religions delivering his famous speech starting with "Sisters and brothers of America". As the audience gives a standing ovation, a gust of wind flipped the pages to the beginning of the storybook, where pictures come to life with bright multi-colored laser animation and 3D effects. The documentary included several of the major stages in Swami Vivekananda's life including his birth, youth, meeting with his spiritual leader Sri Ramakrishna, taking his monastic vows, traveling across India as a penniless, itinerant monk, traveling to the United States as the first Hindu monk to speak at the Parliament of the World's Religions, introducing yoga, lecturing around the United States and other countries, founding the Ramakrishna Mission, and ultimately leaving behind a huge legacy.

== Production ==
The making of Swamiji spanned six years, starting from Manick Sorcar's visit to the Art Institute of Chicago in 2006, when he was inspired to make the laser documentary on the philosopher-monk and started doing research on the subject with the help of the Art Institute library and the State Government of Illinois. The following years entailed research, building the storyboard, and developing the corresponding 3D special effects. The final production incorporated several color lasers, animation and atmospherics synchronized with intelligent lighting, haze machines, and surrounding sound system to present the mystical life story of the great monk. The objective of the laser show was to relive and spread the message of Swami Vivekananda of the 19th century in the light of the 21st century.

There are two songs in it. The lyrics for "Mano Chalo Nijo Niketane" were written by Ajay Udayanath Pakrashi and sung by Anindya Basu; and the lyrics for "Prabhuji Mero Awagun Chit Na Dharo" were written by Surdas, and sung by Durga Rahul.

== Premiere ==
In India, the premier took place on 10 October 2012 at the Grand Theater of Science City, Kolkata the largest science center in the Indian subcontinent under National Council of Science Museums, Ministry of Culture, Government of India. The show was organized by the Ramakrishna Mission Institute of Culture, Kolkata and inaugurated by Ms. Kumari Selja, Minister for Culture, Housing & Urban Poverty Alleviation, Government of India, who lit the lamp followed by Vedic Chanting by Ramakrishna Mission devotees. In the United States, the premiere took place on 24 August 2013 at the Colorado Height University Theater, Denver, Colorado, organized by SEWA International, USA.

On 20 January 2013 it was nationally telecast in India by the ABP Ananda News Channel of Anandabazar Patrika, Kolkata.

== Reception ==
The show has been widely acclaimed by critics. The Ramakrishna Math and Ramakrishna Mission, Belur Math, Howrah, India said "It was as if he was painting the events of Swamiji’s life with a paintbrush before our eyes. It was fascinating." The show took place on 31 January 2014 at Belur Math campus, attended by 15,000 people. The Times of India wrote: "the documentary uses cutting-edge laser technology to transport the audience to a world where art fuses with science seamlessly."

In a review of the show in Delhi, Ramakrishna Mission, Delhi wrote: "It is difficult to express in words the quality of production. Apart from the very impressive display of laser technique, what really gladdened our hearts was the accuracy, authenticity and the appropriate nature of the choice of incidents, music, narration, etc...It gives wonderful glimpse of his work in the West as well as in India. It highlights some of the most important and soul-stirring messages of Swamiji. In our view the Western audience would appreciate the show even more because Swami Vivekananda's message of harmony has been beautifully highlighted."

In a review of the show in Houston, Texas, Indo American News wrote: "The sixth annual fundraiser of Sewa International held at the Stafford Center on Sept 8 was a resounding success being a totally sold out event thanks to the featured attraction, Manick Sorcar’s one of-a-kind unique laser documentary on the life of Swami Vivekananda. [...] The audience was spellbound and proved to be very emotional for several and the Houston crowd honored him with a standing ovation."

Voice of Asia TV News wrote: "A pencil torch emitting laser light turned into a magic wand and the magic of light brought to life the ever green story of a world famous monk, known as Swami Vivekananda. The expectant audience, unfamiliar with the technique of laser show, was perhaps looking for a miracle and miracle, indeed, occurred as ships sailed, trains arrived, men and women walked and children played, all walks of life continued, bound and shaped by sheer light…The art of cartoon and animation reached its zenith in the hands of the reputed Laserist Manick Sorcar."

== Awards ==
At the 25th International Laser Display Association Annual Conference on 6 November 2013 in Aalen, Germany, Manick Sorcar received the "Special Achievement Award for Cultural Enlightenment". He was "Awarded for exceptional merit in using laser display to celebrate India’s heritage, and to prepare the next generation by introducing a course on laser art and animation and establishing the Manick Sorcar Laser Animation Laboratory at Jadavpur University".
