= TeachAids =

Nonprofit social enterprise

Coordinates: 37°25′19″N 122°12′40″W

- Founded: 2009
- Founders: Piya Sorcar; Clifford Nass; Shuman Ghosemajumder; Ashwini Doshi
- Type: U.S. 501(c)(3) nonprofit
- Purpose: education technology
- Location: Palo Alto, California
- Origins: Stanford University
- Region served: Worldwide
- Key people: Piya Sorcar (CEO)
- Website: teachaids.org

TeachAids (pronounced /ˌtiːtʃˈeɪdz/) is a nonprofit social enterprise that develops global health education technology products for HIV/AIDS, concussions, and COVID-19, based on an approach invented through research at Stanford University.

The TeachAids software for HIV education, their first area of focus, has been cited as a model health intervention. Since the materials bypass issues of stigma, they allow HIV prevention education to be provided to communities where it has previously not been allowed. In other communities, the tutorials provide the highest learning effects and comfort rates of any tested educational approach. Their HIV products are animated, interactive software tutorials, developed for individual cultures and languages, and incorporating the voices of celebrities from each region. In India, these include national icons such as Amitabh Bachchan, Shabana Azmi, Nagarjuna and Sudeep Ssanjeev. In Botswana, they include musicians Scar, Zeus, and former President of Botswana, Festus Mogae.

TeachAids operates globally, with its software in use in more than 80 countries. Its materials are made available for free under a Creative Commons License, funded by sponsorships, grants, and donations. Backers include Barclays, Cigna, Covington & Burling, Google, Microsoft, UNICEF, and Yahoo!.

== History ==
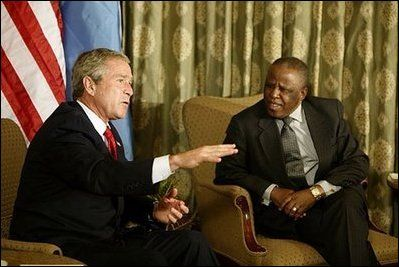
Former President of Botswana, Festus Mogae (right), a TeachAids advisor, helped bring the tutorials to Botswana.

TeachAids began in 2005 as a research project at Stanford University. From 2005 to 2009, a new interdisciplinary approach to HIV/AIDS education was developed through IRB-approved research by Piya Sorcar. Key advisors included professors Shelley Goldman (Learning Sciences), Martin Carnoy (Comparative Education), Cheryl Koopman (Psychiatry), Randall Stafford (Epidemiology), and Clifford Nass (Communication).

The project's goal was to find a way to address the frequently taboo subjects associated with sexual issues and HIV/AIDS specifically. One major finding was that 2D cartoon figures were the optimal balance between comfort and clarity in terms of visual representation for sex-related topics. On that basis, animated storyboards were created which emphasized the biological aspects of HIV transmission and used cultural euphemisms to overcome social stigma. In addition, specific pedagogical techniques (e.g., instructional scaffolding) were utilized to create a coherent conception of HIV transmission for learners, as opposed to the fragmented knowledge created by mass media campaigns.

Early research versions of the software were sponsored by Time Warner, the Government of South Korea, and Neeru Khosla, and used custom illustrations drawn by Sorcar's father, award-winning animator Manick Sorcar. Pilot versions were subsequently created in English, Hindi, Kinyarwanda, Mandarin, and Spanish. Additional experts contributed to the design and evaluation of the materials, including Stanford professors David Katzenstein (Infectious Disease), Douglas Owens (Medicine), and Roy Pea (Learning Sciences).

TeachAids was spun out of Stanford in 2009 as an independent 501(c)(3) organization, co-founded by Piya Sorcar, Clifford Nass, Shuman Ghosemajumder, and Ashwini Doshi. It began developing its infrastructure and new versions of its software for additional countries and languages around the world. The first additional versions of the software in Indian English, Telugu, and Tswana were launched in 2010.

== Celebrity partners ==
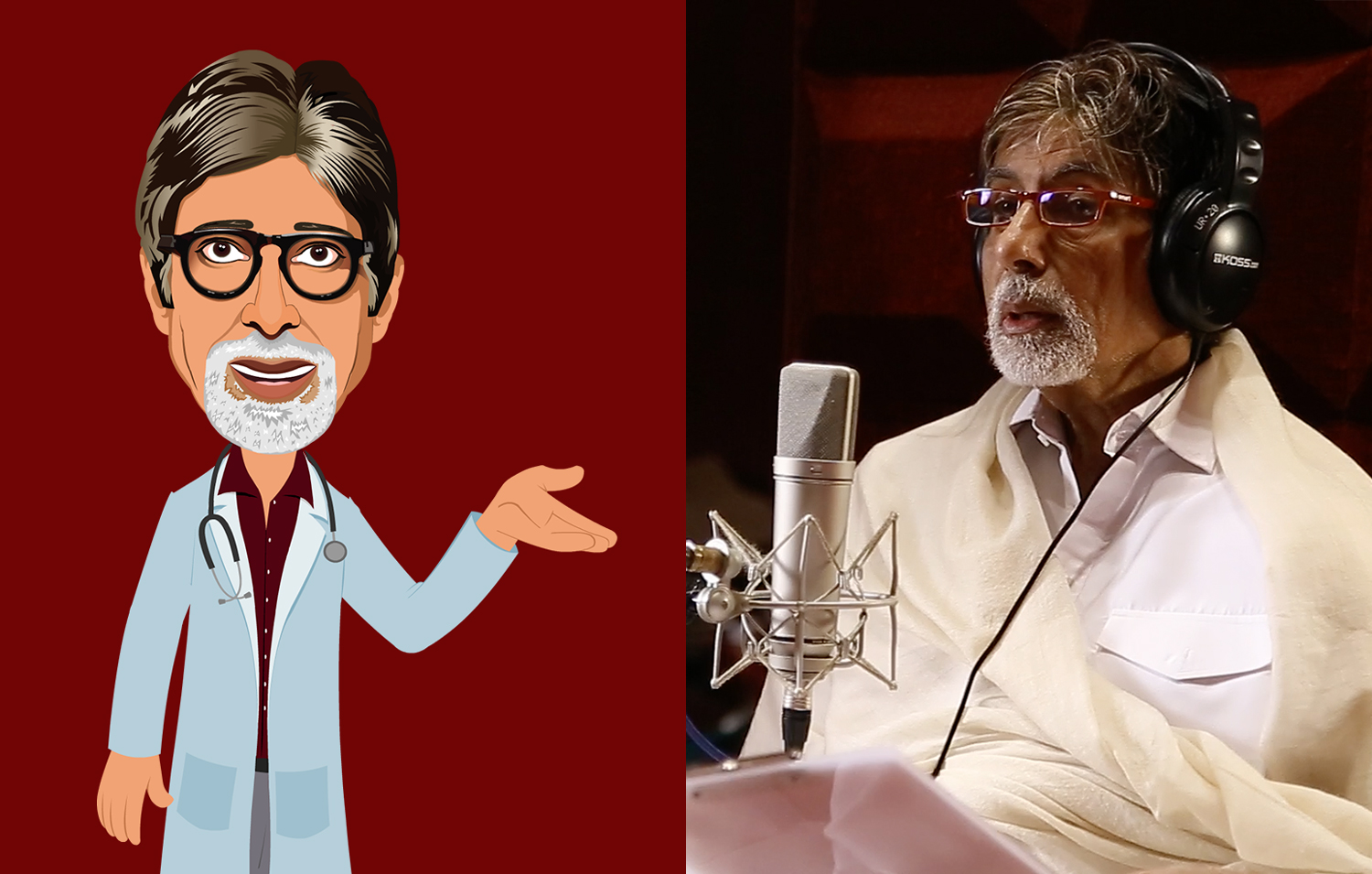
TeachAIDS character of Amitabh Bachchan (left); Bachchan in 2013 TeachAids recording session (right)

The TeachAids interactive software implements animated avatars of cultural icons to improve pedagogical efficacy. Over time, numerous international actors, musicians, and celebrities have lent their voices and likenesses to the TeachAids materials. These include:

- Amitabh Bachchan
- Amol Palekar
- Anu Choudhury
- Anu Prabhakar
- Anushka Shetty
- Jayanthi
- Imran Khan
- Moloya Goswami
- Nagarjuna Akkineni
- Navdeep
- Prashanta Nanda
- Swati Reddy
- Shabana Azmi
- Shruti Haasan
- Siddharth
- Sudeep
- Suhasini Maniratnam
- Suriya
- Vijay Raghavendra
- Zerifa Wahid
- Zeus

The TeachAids advisory board includes film director Mahesh Bhatt, HIV/AIDS treatment pioneer Nimmagadda Prasad, Global Fund for Women founder Anne Firth Murray, and former President of Botswana Festus Mogae. Actress Amala Akkineni is a trustee of TeachAids in India.

In 2020, Kate Courtney starred in a concussion education video for their CrashCourse virtual reality series.

== Worldwide use ==
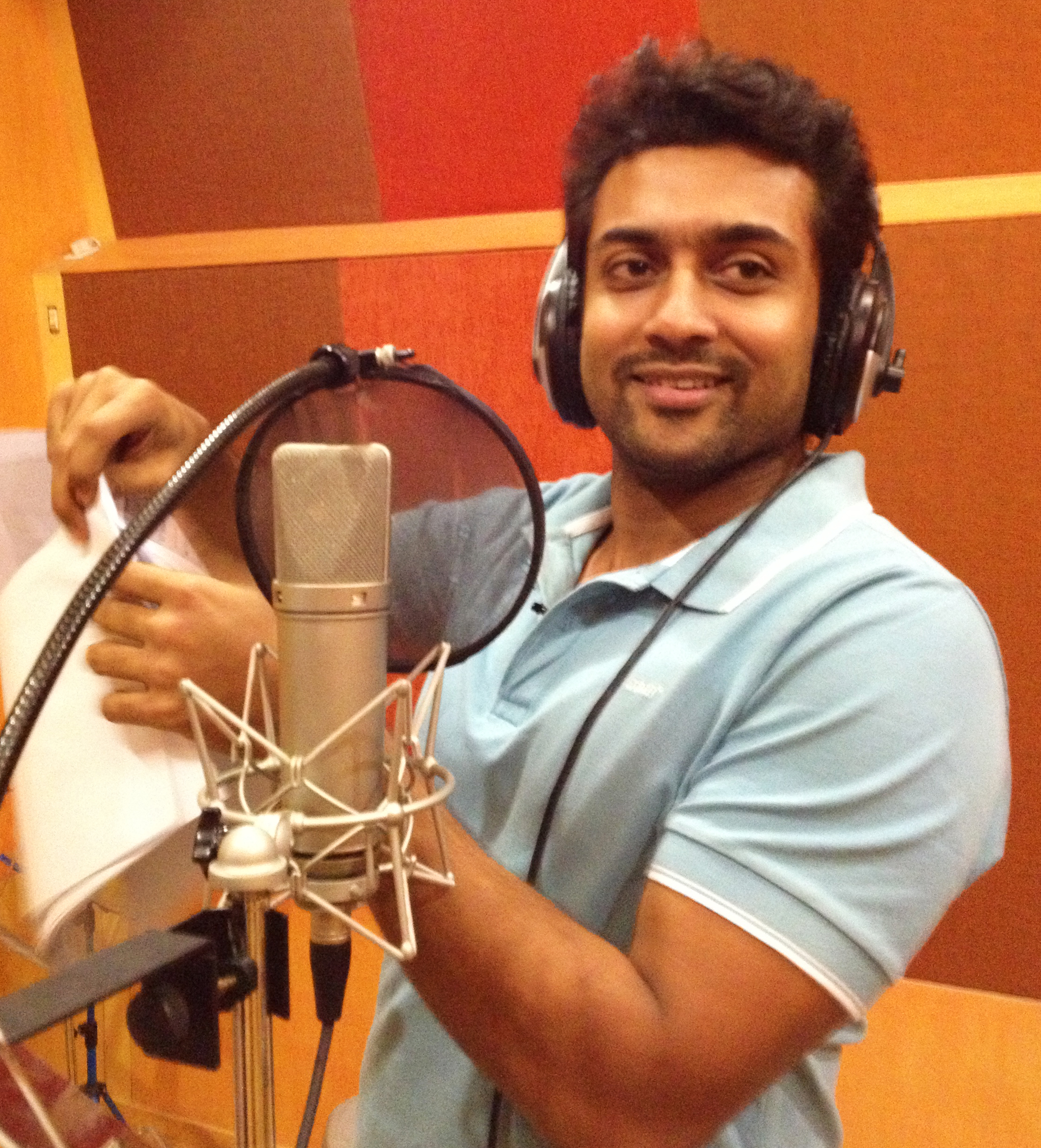
Suriya at a TeachAIDS campaign

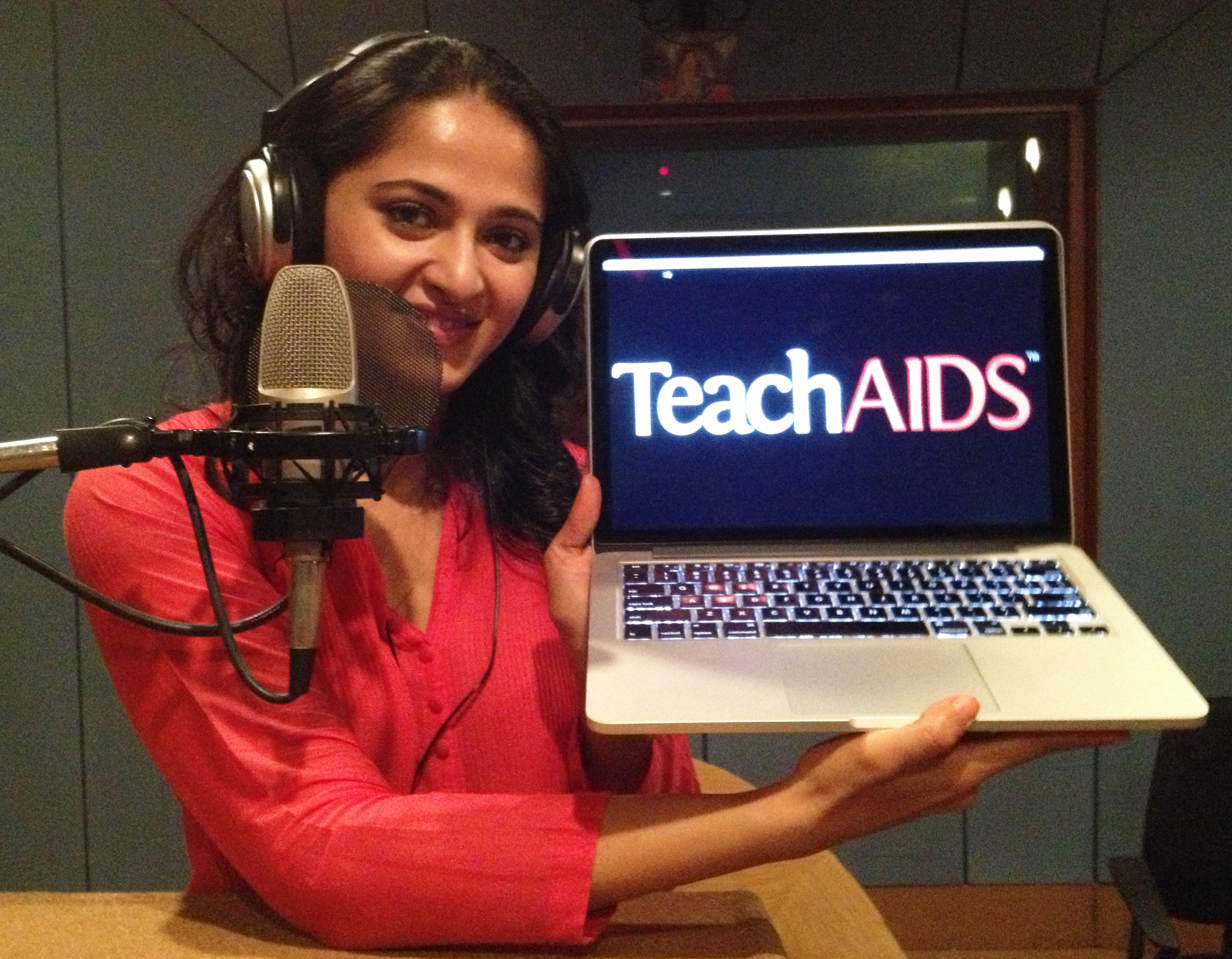
Actress Anushka Shetty in 2013 TeachAIDS recording session

The TeachAids tutorials are available for free online and are used in more than 80 countries around the world, distributed by over 200 partner organizations. Numerous AIDS service organizations, AIDS education and training centers, NGOs, and government agencies distribute and utilize the tutorials as part of their own HIV/AIDS prevention efforts. Some of the organizations partnered with TeachAids include CARE, the Elizabeth Glaser Pediatric AIDS Foundation, and the U.S. Peace Corps.

In India, the National AIDS Control Organisation approved the TeachAids materials in January 2010, marking the first time HIV/AIDS education could be provided decoupled from sex education. Later that year, the Government of Karnataka approved the materials for their state of 50 million and committed to distributing them in 5,500 government schools. In Assam, Chief Minister Tarun Gogoi helped launched TeachAids. Odisha, Andhra Pradesh, and other Indian states have also joined with official support and distribution.

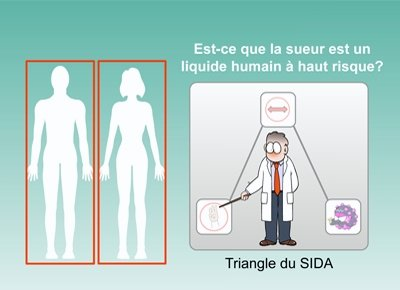
Screenshot from the TeachAIDS software

In Botswana, the TeachAids tutorials were adopted nationally as the standard method for HIV/AIDS education. In 2011, the Ministry of Education began distributing the tutorials to every primary, secondary, and tertiary educational institution in the country, reaching all learners from 6 to 24 years of age nationwide. June 15 in Botswana was declared "National TeachAIDS Day".

In the United States, the Stanford Program on International and Cross-Cultural Education distributes the tutorials on CD along with a custom educator handbook, both of which are made available at no cost.

The creation of TeachAids has been cited as an important innovation in achieving the United Nations Millennium Development Goal for combating the spread of HIV/AIDS.

In 2012, TeachAids was named one of 12 global laureates by The Tech Awards, referred to as the "Nobel prize of tech philanthropy".

== See also ==
- AIDS education and training centers
- HIV/AIDS in Africa
- HIV/AIDS in India
- Sex education
