= Raktakarabi (film) =

Raktokorobi
- Directed by: Amitabh Bhattacharjee
- Written by: Rabindranath Tagore
- Cinematography: Naiyer Ghufran
- Edited by: Amit Debnath
- Release date: 2017
- Country: India
- Language: Bengali

Raktokorobi is a 2017 Indian Bengali film directed by Amitava Bhattacharya, starring Kaushik Sen, and Rahul. It was included in the long list for the 90th Academy Awards. It was also released in Hollywood as Red Oleanders Raktokarobi with English subtitles.

== Cast ==
- Kaushik Sen
- Rahul
- Ushasie Chakraborty
- Mumtaz Sorcar
- Debdut Ghosh
