= Not a Dirty Film =

2015 Indian Bengali film

- Directed by: Ranadeep Sarkar
- Written by: Jyotirmay Deb
- Story by: Ranadeep Sarkar
- Produced by: Indira Roy Chowdhury
- Starring: Saheb Bhattacharya; Mumtaz Sorcar; Rajatava Dutta Ena saha, Kharaj Mukherjee
- Music by: Dev Sen; Adhyan Dhara
- Production company: Sonic solutions
- Release date: 6 November 2015
- Country: India
- Language: Bengali

Not a Dirty Film is a 2015 Bengali crime-romance film directed by Ranadeep Sarkar starring Saheb Bhattacharya, Mumtaz Sorcar, Rajatava Dutta, Ena Saha and Kharaj Mukherjee in lead roles. The film received poor critical reviews.

== Cast ==
- Saheb Bhattacharya
- Mumtaz Sorcar
- Ena Saha
- Rajatava Dutta
- Kharaj Mukherjee

== Soundtrack ==
Not A Dirty Film

Soundtrack album
- Recorded: 2016
- Genre: Feature film soundtrack
- Label: Times Music
- Producer: Indira Roychowdhuri

=== Track list ===
No.	Title	Artist(s)	Length
1.	"Not A Dirty Film (Title Track)"	Sourik & Gopika	3:33
2.	"Tu hi meri zindegi"	Vicky	3:22
3.	"Yeh nasha"	Gopika	3:34
4.	"Aj Somoy"	Timir Biswas
