= Vazhakkunnam =

Indian magician and illusionist

- Born: 8 February 1903; Pattambi, Malabar District, Madras Presidency, British India (now in Palakkad, Kerala, India)
- Died: 9 February 1983 (aged 80)
- Other name: Professor Vazhakkunnam
- Occupations: Magician; Illusionist
- Spouse: K. C. Anujathi Thampuratty
- Children: K. C. Aravindakshan Raja; K. C. Thulasidas Raja; K. C. Sumathy
- Parents: Raman Atithiripad; Arya Pathanaadi

Vazhakkunnam Neelakandan Namboothiri (8 February 1903 – 9 February 1983), better known as Professor Vazhakkunnam was an Indian performing magician and illusionist from the south Indian state of Kerala. He was one of the earliest practitioners of the art of magic in India and the pioneer of the art in Kerala, which earned him the moniker, "the Father of Magic in Kerala". He is credited with popularising the art form in his home state.

== Biography ==
Neelakandan Namboothiri was born on 8 February 1903 (Makaram 26, 1078 on Makyeeryam nakshatra as per Malayalam calendar) in Vaazhakunnath Mana in Thiruvegappura, near Pattambi, in Palakkad district of the south Indian state of Kerala to Raman Atithiripad, a witty Brahmin popularly known as Vaazhakkunnam Ateeri and Arya Pathanaadi, as their fourth son. His early schooling included Othu (study of vedas) after which his elder brother, Vasudevan Namboothiri, himself known as a Bhagavata scholar, taught him Sanskrit and he learned English under the tutelage of Pattambi Narayana Iyer. He developed a liking to magic at an early age when he watched a local magician by name, Mundaya Eachara Varier, performing at his home. Later, he also developed a fascination for elephants and this led him to study Matanga Lila, a Sanskrit treatise about elephants, under Kochunni Thampuran of Kodungallur Kovilakam. It was here he chanced upon a magic performance of Pallatheri Nambyathan Namboodiri and the young Neelakandan, with his teacher's permission, started learning magic under Pallatheri. Later, he learned the Bullet trick and Hair trick from a magician named Baker.

Vazhakunnam was married to K. C. Anujathi Thampuratty of Kottakkal Kovilakam and the couple had two sons, Aravindakshan Raja and Thulasidas Raja and a daughter, Sumathy. He died on 9 February 1983, a day after his 80th birthday, survived by his three children. His wife had predeceased him in 1980.

== Career and legacy ==
Once Vazhakunnam tricked a ticket examiner of a Coimbatore bound train into believing all the passengers were traveling without tickets and all the tickets found in the examiner's pocket. An apocryphal story about Vazhakunnam.

Vazhakkunnam, though he used to perform mesmerism and hypnotism occasionally, was more keen on performing impromptu magic such as Cheppum Panthum, a trick using small cups and balls. He was one of the first performing magicians in Kerala and his contribution in developing the art form earned him the title, the Father of Magic in Kerala. His early performances were amidst small gatherings at homes and his first public performance on a stage was in 1940.

One of the main contributions of Vazhakunnam is his students; he taught several of which students such as R. K. Malayath, who would later tutor Paryanampatta Kunchunny Nambudiripad, Joy Oliver, K. P. Krishnan Bhattathiripad, Kuttiyadi Nanu, K. S. Manoharan, K. J. Nair and Vadakkeppad Parameswaran, Raghavan went on to become known magicians in their own rights. The Magic Academy set up by Gopinath Muthukad, together with Kerala Sangeeta Nataka Akademi holds annual magic competition at Thalassery, which has been named Vazhakunnam Memorial State-level Magic Competitions after Vazhakunnam. Several poets such as Vallathol Narayana Menon, Ulloor S. Parameswara Iyer and Kunjunni Mash have written poems, praising him. Ramana, the dutch magician and mentalist, has established a school of magic named after Vazhakunnam under the name, The Vazhakunnam Namboothiri Academy of Magical Sciences. Vazhakunnam Yugami is an all India annual magic competition organized in memory of Vazhakunnam.

== Documentary on Vazhakunnam ==
Gopinath Muthukad's Magic Academy has made a 12-minute documentary on the life and art of Vazhakunnam, which has an introduction by O. N. V. Kurup and the magician's children, K. C. Thulasidas, and K. C. Sumathi talk about their father.

== See also ==
- Indian magicians
