= Sesh Chithi =

- Original Poster
- Directed by: Tanmoy Roy
- Produced by: Sudhir Dutta
- Starring: Soumitra Chatterjee; Lily Chakravarty; Ritobroto Bhattacharya; Moubani Sorcar; Monica Ganguly - Canada; Dulal Lahiri; Dev Ganguly - Canada; Biswajit Chakroborty; Sudhir Dutta; Narugopal Mandal
- Cinematography: Partha Rakshit
- Edited by: M.Susmit
- Music by: Sudhir Dutta
- Production company: D. Sudhir Productions
- Release date: 18 May 2018
- Country: India
- Language: Bengali

Sesh Chithi is a 2018 Bengali drama film directed by Tanmoy Roy for D.Sudhir Productions. The music is directed by Sudhir Dutta. The film is about a handful of cunning family members who plan to take over a Zamindar bari after the death of the patriarch. Soumitra Chatterjee was felicitated on the sets for receiving Légion d'honneur. Soumitra Chatterjee and Lily Chakravarty will be seen in the film after the great success of Posto.

== Plot ==
An old widow, Mamatadevi, is reading out her husband's last letter and memorizing her old glorious days. Today Mamatadevi is going to an old people's home. Sibnath, Mamatadevi's husband, was a postmaster who belongs to the Zamindar family and Mamatadevi also used to live at the family home. Mamatadevi's daughter and son-in-law Ramen live in Mumbai. He is a businessman of antique products. On the day of retirement of Shibnath, his daughter Mou left Ranen for his torturing behavior and came to his father's house. But Shibnath died due to cardiac arrest on the same day. Suddenly, after 5 long years, Ranen came to his in-laws house to take Mou to Mumbai. But his intention was to take charge of the property. He was successful in this and planned to send his mother-in-law ito an old people's home.

== Cast ==
- Soumitra Chatterjee
- Lily Chakravarty
- Ritobroto Bhattacharya
- Moubani Sorcar
- Dulal Lahiri
- Biswajit Chakroborty
- Santwana Bose
- Sudhir Dutta
- Monica Ganguly - Canada
- Narugopal Mandal
- Dev Ganguly - Canada

== Release ==
The film released in West Bengal on 18 May 2018. The film was distributed by D. Sudhir Productions.

== Soundtrack ==
The songs for the soundtrack of Sesh Chithi are composed by D. Sudhir, music directed by Sudhir Dutta, lyrics by Rajib Dutta. The soundtrack was released on iTunes on 25 July 2017. The music was released physically on 25 July 2017 at Press club, Kolkata.

No	Title	Lyrics	Music	Artist(s)	Length
1	"Cholkalo Aaj Tor Chhoya"	Rajiv Dutta	D. Sudhir	Rakhi Dutta, Rik	05:53
2	"Dil Bole"	Rajiv Dutta	D. Sudhir	Rakhi Dutta, Tirtha	04:09
3	"Routine"	Rajiv Dutta	D. Sudhir	Rakhi Dutta, Sujoy Bhowmik, Rupsha Dutta, Partha, Aritra, Sohom	05:26
4	"Tor Askara"	Rajiv Dutta	D. Sudhir	Rakhi Dutta, Vicky A Khan	04:41
5	"Sawariya"	Rajiv Dutta	D. Sudhir	Rakhi Dutta	05:42
6	"Sesh Chithi"	Rajiv Dutta	D. Sudhir	Rupankar Bagchi	04:12
7	"Ami Tomar Premey"	Rabindranath Tagore	Rabindranath Tagore	Iman Chakraborty	03:19
