= Kanchenjunga Express (film) =

2012 Indian Bengali-language film

- Film poster
- Directed by: Arnab Ghosh
- Starring: Mumtaz Sorcar; Sabyasachi Chakrabarty; Rajatava Dutta; Kanchan Mullick; Jaya Seal
- Edited by: Dipak Mandal
- Music by: Souvik Gupta
- Release date: 24 May 2012 (Kolkata)
- Country: India
- Language: Bengali

Kanchenjunga Express is a 2012 Indian Bengali film directed by Arnab Ghosh. It was Ghosh's début. Kanchenjunga Express is a woman-centric film that unfolds in a train with a lot of suspense. The music is scored by Souvik Gupta and has songs by Rupam Islam, Usha Uthup and Kunal Ganjawala.

== Plot ==
Kanchenjunga Express is a suspense thriller revolving around the life of Nandini, an NGO worker. Nandini is a simple kind-hearted woman dealing with two failed marriages. She is married to the wrong kind of men and exploited because of her simplicity. She has learned many good lessons from the experiences of her life, and thus she is tough, strong and independent.

The film shows three situations of Nandini's life and how she faces them.

== Cast ==
- Mumtaz Sorcar as Nandini
- Sabyasachi Chakrabarty
- Rajatava Dutta
- Kanchan Mullick
- Bratya Basu
- Angshuman Gupta
- Jaya Seal
