= Deepa & Rupa: A Fairy Tale from India =

- Directed by: Manick Sorcar
- Screenplay by: Manick Sorcar, Myron D. Holman
- Produced by: Manick Sorcar
- Starring: Piya Sorcar, Deepa Reddy
- Cinematography: William R. Heiss
- Edited by: Manick Sorcar
- Production company: Manick Sorcar Productions
- Distributed by: Manick Sorcar Productions
- Release date: 13 September 1990
- Running time: 30 minutes
- Countries: United States; India
- Language: English

Deepa & Rupa: A Fairy Tale from India is a 1990 Indian-American live-action animated children's film written, directed and produced by Manick Sorcar. It was the first Indian film to combine live action and animation throughout the entire feature length.

== Plot ==
Two stepsisters, Deepa and Rupa, have different personalities. Deepa is selfish, Rupa is kind. The personified 'wind' steals their cotton, forcing the sisters to go to the old woman in the moon. Along the way they encounter a number of magical creatures, including a horse, a cow, and a banyan tree, all needing their help. Each sister's actions contribute to their ultimately different fates, teaching children the morals of kindness and service to others as well as respect for nature.

== Cast ==
Live actors

- Piya Sorcar — Rupa
- Deepa Reddy — Deepa
- Sharmishtha Arora — Moon Lady
- Sunita Budhiraja — Deepa's mother
- Shikha Sorcar — Rupa's mother

Voice actors

- Rajeev Arora — Narrator
- Jeff Altman — Banyan
- Bhimleshwar Gupta — Cow
- Manick Sorcar — Horse
- Nikhil Unadkat — Wind

== Production ==
Deepa & Rupa was produced before the advent of high-quality computer-generated graphics, requiring Sorcar to create all of the animation by hand, and using computers for inbetweening. He painted all background scenes by hand on newsprint, flattened under a sheet of glass to prevent the watercolors from warping the paper. Chroma-key technology was used with a bluescreen to composite the live action performances with the animation. Although described by Jayant Sen of Animation World Network to be the "first feature length live-action and animation mixed film" in India, the Tamil-language film Raja Chinna Roja (1989) had already featured animated characters in a song sequence, and was described by its producer M. Saravanan as "the first Indian film to use animated characters with real life persons".

== Reception ==
Deepa & Rupa was critically acclaimed, winning 11 international awards.

It won the Gold Plaque for the Children's Programs category and the Silver Plaque for the Animation category at the Chicago International Film Festival. It beat out Children's Television Workshop’s Sesame Street and Hanna-Barbera’s The Greatest Adventure and won the Silver Medal for Computer Graphics and the Bronze Medal for Children's Program at the International Film and TV Festival of New York. It received three nominations at the 1991 Heartland Regional Emmy Awards, for Outstanding Individual Youth/Children's Program, Outstanding Individual Craft: Animation, and Outstanding Individual Craft: Acting/Performing (for Piya Sorcar's performance as Rupa). It also received an Honorable Mention in the Children's Education category at the Columbus International Film & Video Festival.

Since its release, Deepa & Rupa has been broadcast on Doordarshan in India, and regularly on PBS in the United States. On the 25th consecutive year of Deepa & Rupa and other animations from Sorcar being broadcast on PBS, Colorado Governor John Hickenlooper congratulated him, saying: "For a quarter of a century, your animation films have taken children on a special journey to the lands of India where they have learned more of her culture and people. These films have taught that diversity is an asset and what brings us together is our common thread of humanity irrespective of where we grow up. Your creative work has served as a cultural bridge between the East and the West by helping to advance multicultural understanding and friendship. Your work continues to make Colorado, the United States, and India proud."
