= Mohammed Chhel =

Pir Mohammed Chhel
- Born: 1850; Ningala, Gadhada, Bhavnagar
- Died: 1925 (aged 74–75)
- Occupations: Mystic, Magician, Indian Magicians

Mohammed Chhel originally a fakir (mystic) was a renowned magician of Saurashtra, Gujarat. Mohammed Chhel was born in 1850 in Ningala, a small village and a railway junction in Gadhada Taluka of Bhavnagar district in Saurashtra, Gujarat (India). Basically he was a Pir of a known Dargah and was involved in benevolent works the entirety of his life. Said to have been blessed with supernatural powers, Mohammed Chhel eventually turned magician but his character and nobility were those of a mystic. The message of life he wished to convey to people was that of himself serving society and helping the needy with his magnetic aura and miraculous acts, flavored by his sense of humor.

People would unfailingly encounter an experience of Mohammed Chhel's magic and miracles if they were traveling by train and, if by luck, were to come across him in the train or at the railway station.

== Popular incidents of Mohammed Chhel ==
People still remember the many occasions of his acts and miracles from their ancestors and the locals who experienced them. In one such incident, he shocked a train ticket checker by producing an avalanche of tickets out of his chin. And a number of times he decoupled the running train as the engine chugged away. People whose ancestors were eye-witnesses to these acts are among the locals in the Gujarat, Saurashtra and Bhavnagar regions.

== Mischief, superiors and experiences ==
Due to the fame of his tricks and ofttimes spontaneous acts, Mohammed Chhel unknowingly made people cautious or frightened. Although his acts were purely for fun, entertainment or a message, he wouldn't hesitate to be extravagant at times. This mischievousness, though earning him reputation and admiration, was challenged a few times. For example, a famous Jain Muni, Shri Vijaynemisuriji Maharaj, taught Chhel the lesson of not harassing Sadhus and Saints, knowingly or otherwise, when he came across them. In another incidence, one Ismaili Imam Saheb caused Mohammed Chhel himself to be wonder-struck in response to his insistent proposal to show off his magic.

== Mission and message ==
Mohammed Chhel attained, although he was already one, the honorable title of 'Pir', meaning a mystique, a fakir. He is often remembered as Pir Mohammed Chhel among the people, across the region and in the provinces of Saurashtra and Gujarat. Mohammed Chhel, became a name of reputation and respect in magician fraternity in Gujarat and India. Defying the routine 'magician' term, Chhel's contribution was more than that of a magician. He would strive and spontaneously extend by his acts and tricks for the benefit of fellows and countrymen.

Exact date of Mohammed Chhel's death is not known, albeit he died in 1925. Some still term a few incidents as stories that have been flowing for over a century with all authentic details and proof remaining verifiable, and many still who shared their eye-witness accounts among locals and in their families happen to attest, those were true. Reason could be those miracles and acts attained the rank of stories because Mohammed Chhel and his real mystic - magical acts got woven in people heart and memory over the years and over the generations.

== See also ==
- Indian Magicians
- Magician (paranormal)
- Magician (illusion)
- Mysticism
