= Comrade (2017 film) =

2017 Bengali drama film

- Directed by: Shankudeb Panda
- Written by: Shankudeb Panda
- Produced by: Easel movies
- Starring: Ena Saha; Kharaj Mukherjee; Moubani Sorcar
- Cinematography: Sashanka Palit
- Edited by: Subhajit Singha
- Music by: Surojit Chatterjee
- Release date: 21 July 2017
- Country: India
- Language: Bengali

Comrade is a Bengali drama film directed by former Trinamul Congress student leader Shankudeb Panda. This film was released on 21 July 2017. The music was released by Amara Muzik.

== Plot ==
The story is based on the Singur - Nandigram violence which took place in the period of 2006 to 2007 in West Bengal. A peasant's movement starts against land acquisition policy by the Government for industrialisation. The government sticks to the point of acquiring land belonging to a factory. Party workers confront the farmers on the issue. Two women, Nandini and Radharani become the leaders of the uprising. Nandini is gang-raped and murdered and Radharani commits suicide. Those horrific incidents make villagers more united for their rights. Later Supreme Court of India orders to stop the land acquisition.

== Cast ==
- Kharaj Mukherjee
- Ena Saha
- Moubani Sorcar
- Bhaswar Chattopadhyay
- Anindya Banerjee
- Prasun Gain
- Mainak Banerjee
- Rajarshi Sengupta

== Production ==
The film is produced by Aatreyee Nirman Easel. Kharaj Mukherjee is playing a key role. The shooting is mainly done in various places of South and North Bengal, including Garhbeta, Singur and Kolkata. The music is composed by Surojit Chatterjee.
