= Sleelatahanir Pore =

2021 Indian Bengali film

- Release poster
- Directed by: Reshmi Mitra
- Screenplay by: Chandan Mukherjee
- Based on: Sleelatahanir Pore by Mallika Sengupta
- Produced by: SK Sahid Imam
- Starring: Soumitra Chatterjee; Rahul Banerjee; Abhishek Chatterjee; Shubham Imam; Moubani Sorcar
- Cinematography: Badal Sarkar
- Edited by: Suvojit Singha
- Music by: Bappa Aurindam
- Production company: Sonam Movies
- Release date: 12 March 2021
- Country: India
- Language: Bengali

Sleelatahanir Pore is a 2021 Bengali social drama film directed by Reshmi Mitra and produced by SK Sahid Imam. The film featuring Soumitra Chatterjee, Rahul Banerjee, Abhishek Chatterjee and Moubani Sorcar, is based on a novel of the same name by the Bengali poet Mallika Sengupta. The film about a rape victim survivor was released on 12 March 2021 under the banner of Sonam Movies.

== Plot ==
The movie is based on the struggle of a rape victim Ricky Sen. Ricky, a young lady works in a Band. In a get together inside the jungle, she was raped by a powerful person Bijon. Bijon is the husband of Mandira Roy, a political and woman activist. Ricky's friend Sanglap, Shuveccha and a journalist try to give her justice but the issue becomes highly political due to Bijon's wife.

== Cast ==
- Soumitra Chatterjee
- Rahul Banerjee as Sanglap
- Abhishek Chatterjee as Bijon
- Moubani Sorcar as Shuveccha
- Sreela Majumdar as Mandira
- Devlina Kumar as Ricky
- Ishaan S Mazumder
- Rayati Bhattacharya
- Asim Bhaduri
- Shubham Imam

== Soundtrack ==
Sleelatahanir Pore

Soundtrack album by Bappa Aurindam
- Released: 24 January 2021
- Recorded: 2020–2021
- Genre: Feature film soundtrack
- Length: 16:57
- Language: Bengali
- Label: Zee Music Bangla

The soundtrack album is composed by Bappa Aurindam.

Track listing
No.	Title	Lyrics	Singer(s)	Length
1.	"Nosto Somoy"	Chandan Mukherjee	Shilajit Majumder	4:13
2.	"Chup Kotha"	Gautam Sushmit	Debopriyo Das & Anwesshaa	5:23
3.	"Abhidhan"	Chandan Mukherjee	Ratnendra Bhaduri	2:48
4.	"Chander Hanshi"	Rabindranath Tagore	Riddhi Bandyopadhyay & Debmalya Chottopadhyay	4:33
Total length:				16:57
