= 033 =

2010 Indian Bengali-language film

4it7, 033 Zero Three Three
- Directed by: Birsa Dasgupta
- Produced by: Soumo Ganguly; Joy Ganguly
- Starring: Rudranil Ghosh; Parambrato Chattopadhyay
- Cinematography: Somak Mukherjee
- Edited by: Debaloy Bhattacharya
- Music by: Chandrabindoo
- Production company: Moxie Entertainments
- Release date: 5 March 2010 (Kolkata)
- Country: India
- Language: Bengali
- Budget: ₹7 million (US$73,000)

033 or Zero Three Three is a 2010 Bengali film directed by Birsa Dasgupta in a directorial debut and produced by Moxie Entertainments. It stars Rudranil Ghosh and Parambrato Chattopadhyay.

033 is the STD code for Kolkata city, and the story is based on the theme of increasing youth migration outside Kolkata for career opportunities.

== Cast ==
- Parambrato Chattopadhyay as Som, lead guitarist
- Swastika Mukherjee as Mrinalini, NRI
- Mumtaz Sorcar as Ria, vocalist
- Sabyasachi Chakraborty as Santiago
- Dhruv Mukherjee as Voodoo, drummer
- Rudranil Ghosh as Rudra, keyboardist
- Saheb Chatterjee
- Madhabi Mukherjee

== Soundtrack ==
The soundtrack's music director is Chandrabindoo and the lyrics are penned by Srijato.
