= Magischer Zirkel der Deutschen Demokratischen Republik =

Magic Circle of the German Democratic Republic

The Magic Circle
- Second logo of the Magischer Zirkel der DDR, adopted January 1969
- Formation: 20 October 1956; 70 years ago (original founding); 6 January 1990; 36 years ago (refounding)
- Dissolved: December 1969; 56 years ago (first dissolution); 29 September 1990; 36 years ago (merged with the Magischer Zirkel von Deutschland)
- Official language: German

The Magischer Zirkel der Deutschen Demokratischen Republik (Magic Circle of the German Democratic Republic) was a national magicians' association that was active in East Germany from 1956 to 1969, and again briefly in 1990.

== History ==
The organization was founded on 20 October 1956 following a meeting between Theo Bozenhard, Hans Marian, Hans Hander (Tosari), Hans-Gerhard Stumpf, and GDR Culture Minister Johannes R. Becher. Erich Kluge served as the organization's first chairman until January 1959, when he stepped down for reasons of ill health. Hans Hander took over as interim leader, becoming first chairman on 12 January 1962 upon Kluge's death. Siegfried Nitsche then served as first chairman from Hander's death in January 1968 until the organization was dissolved in December 1969.

Following the group's dissolution, magicians' associations in East Germany were confined to the local level. In 1974 there were forty such associations, with a total membership of around 600. By 1990 the number of associations had risen to 52.

On 11 November 1989, ten magicians convened in Leipzig and made an application to the Ministry of Culture to revive the Magischer Zirkel der DDR. Among the refounders were Hans-Georg Bucsi, Klaus Fürst, Hans-Gerhard Stumpf, and Annette Kirberg-Stumpf. The association was officially re-established on 6 January 1990. At its first conference on 10 March of that year, Hans-Gerhard Stumpf was elected president. Within a few months, Stumpf and the managing directors of the association met with their West German counterparts in the Magischer Zirkel von Deutschland to discuss unification of the two groups. The merger was effected on 29 September 1990.
