= Shuman Ghosemajumder =

Canadian technologist, entrepreneur, and author

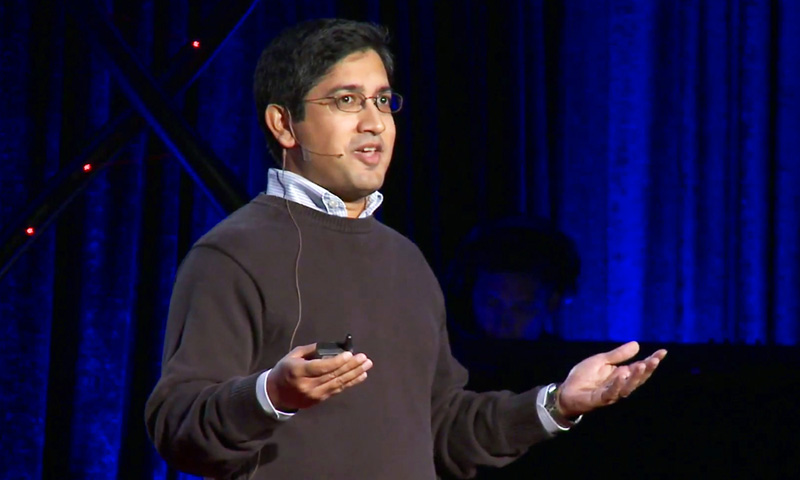
- Born: 1974 (age 51–52); Stuttgart, West Germany
- Education: University of Western Ontario, MIT Sloan School of Management
- Occupations: Technologist, Entrepreneur

Shuman Ghosemajumder (born 1974) is a Canadian technologist, entrepreneur, and author. He is the former click fraud czar at Google, the author of works on technology and business including the Open Music Model, and co-founder of TeachAids. He was chief technology officer for Shape Security, which was acquired in 2020 for $1 billion by F5, where he became head of artificial intelligence. He is the co-founder and CEO of Reken, an AI cybersecurity startup. He is a Senior Fellow at the University of Toronto's Munk School of Global Affairs and Public Policy. He is on the advisory board of the Schwartz Reisman Institute for Technology and Society.

== Early life ==
Ghosemajumder was born in Stuttgart, West Germany and grew up in London, Ontario, Canada. He attended London South Collegiate Institute, where he was elected student council president. He earned a BSc in Computer Science from the University of Western Ontario, where he attended after receiving a Canada Merit Scholarship Foundation award as one of the top fifteen students in the country. While in university, he was the North American Public Speaking Champion and president of the Canadian University Society for Intercollegiate Debate. He earned an MBA from the MIT Sloan School of Management. He also earned a brown belt in Goju-Ryu karate.

== Career ==
Early in his career, he created the first real-time collaborative graphic design application as a software engineer at Groupware. He was later co-founder of a software development firm, and a management consultant with McKinsey & Company and IBM.

Ghosemajumder worked at Google from 2003 to 2010, where he led product management efforts for protecting their advertising services, worth US $20 billion in annual pay per click revenue, against click fraud. He was one of the early product managers for AdSense, led the launch of Link Units and AdSense for Feeds, and was part of the team that launched Gmail. He was the recipient of two Google Founders' Awards for significant entrepreneurial accomplishments.

He left Google in 2010 for TeachAids, a non-profit educational technology start-up spun-out of Stanford University, which he had co-founded and where he was chairman. In 2012, he joined Shape Security, which was acquired by F5 in 2020. In 2024, he founded Reken, a startup to combat generative AI-enabled fraud, raising $10 million in seed funding.

== Works ==
He is co-author of CGI Programming Unleashed (Macmillan, ISBN 1-57521-151-3, 1997) and a contributing author to Crimeware (Symantec Press, ISBN 0-321-50195-0, 2008). His master's thesis proposed the Open Music Model, which predicted the use of music subscription services.

In 2011, he was included on the MIT150 list, as one of the top innovators from the Massachusetts Institute of Technology.
