= Gopinath Muthukad =

Indian magician, escapologist, life coach

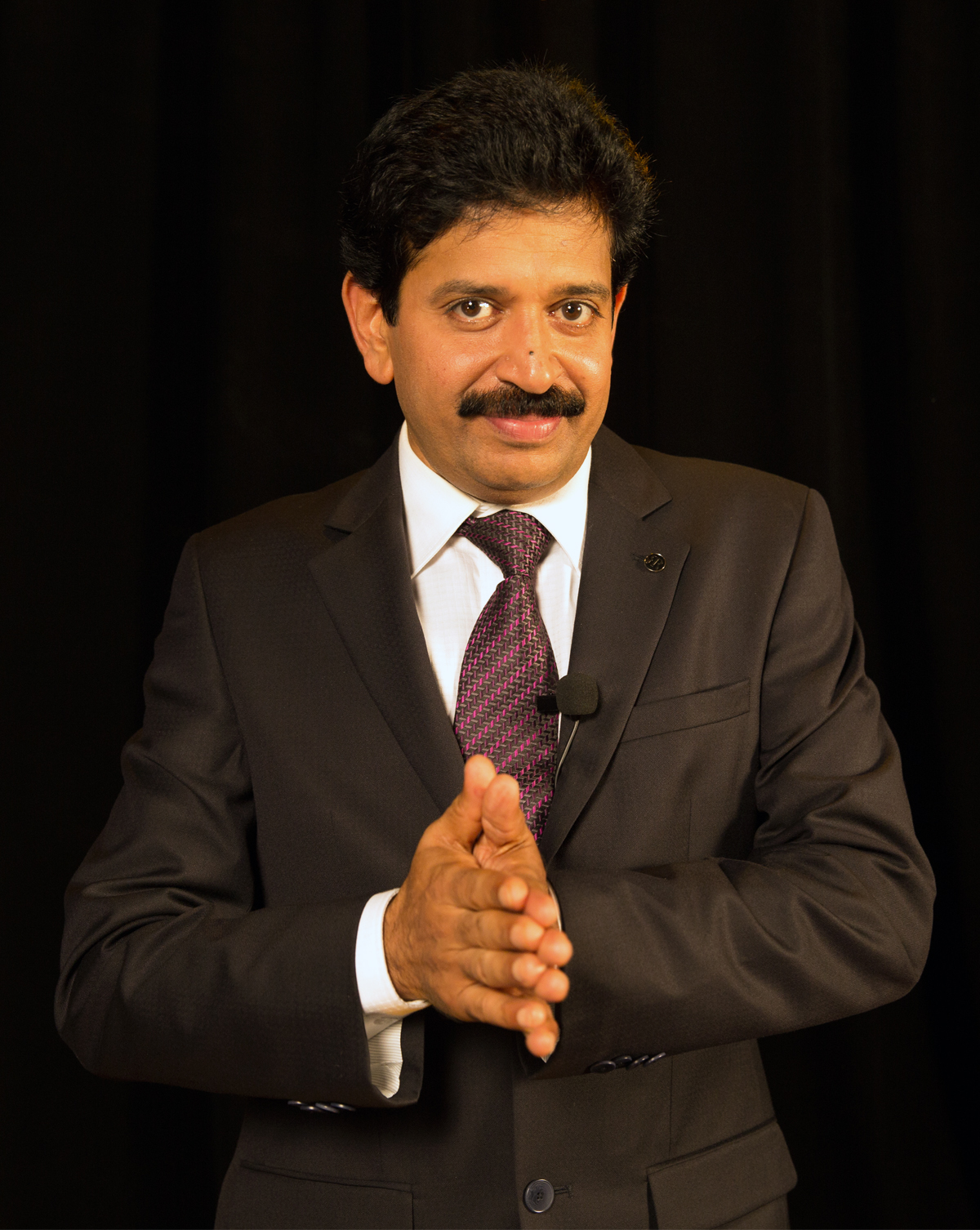
- Born: 10 April 1964 (age 62); Nilambur, Malappuram, Kerala, India
- Education: N. S. S. College, Manjeri
- Occupation: Magician
- Spouse: Kavitha Muthukad
- Children: Vismay Muthukad
- Parents: Kunhunni Nair; Devaki Amma
- Website: www.muthukad.com

Gopinath Muthukad (born 10 April 1964) is an Indian magician from Kerala. He employs magic as a medium to convey his messages to public. Muthukad founded the world's first magic academy, The Academy of Magical Sciences, and first magic museum, Magic Planet at Thiruvananthapuram.

In 1995, he became the first magician in the world to perform an escape act in the style of Harry Houdini's act of 1904. In the same year, he was awarded the Kerala Sangeetha Nataka Akademi award. Muthukad is the winner of the International Merlin Award instituted by the International Magicians' Society.

Muthukad is the first Keralite to be honoured as the celebrity supporter by the UN agency UNICEF, for promoting child right activities in Kerala. In 2021, Muthukad has announced his retirement from professional magic shows and now he has focused his area of work mainly on empowering the disabled community. In 2022, he was honoured with Kerala Sree Award, third highest civilian award given by the Government of Kerala.

== Early life ==
Muthukad was born on 10 April 1964 in Kavalamukkatta, near Nilambur to Kunhunni Nair and Devaki Amma. Even at an early age, he showed a great interest in magic having heard stories about Vazhakkunnam who was one of the great magicians in Kerala. At the age of 10, he was caught performing magic in class by a teacher who then encouraged him to hold his first show at his school. Muthukad says this was the turning point in his life. Over the years his determination to pursue magic as a career grew stronger despite stiff opposition from his father.

After graduating in mathematics from N. S. S. College, Manjeri he enrolled at a law College in Bangalore but later withdrew and left his home in Nilambur for Thiruvananthapuram to pursue a career in magic. He has performed at more than 10,000 shows in India and abroad.

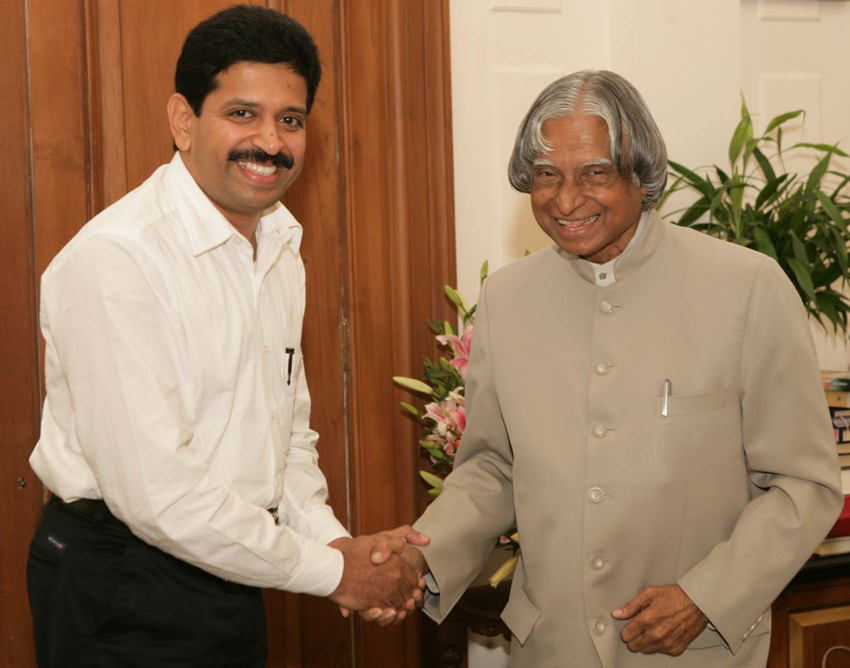
Muthukad with former President of India, APJ Abdul Kalam

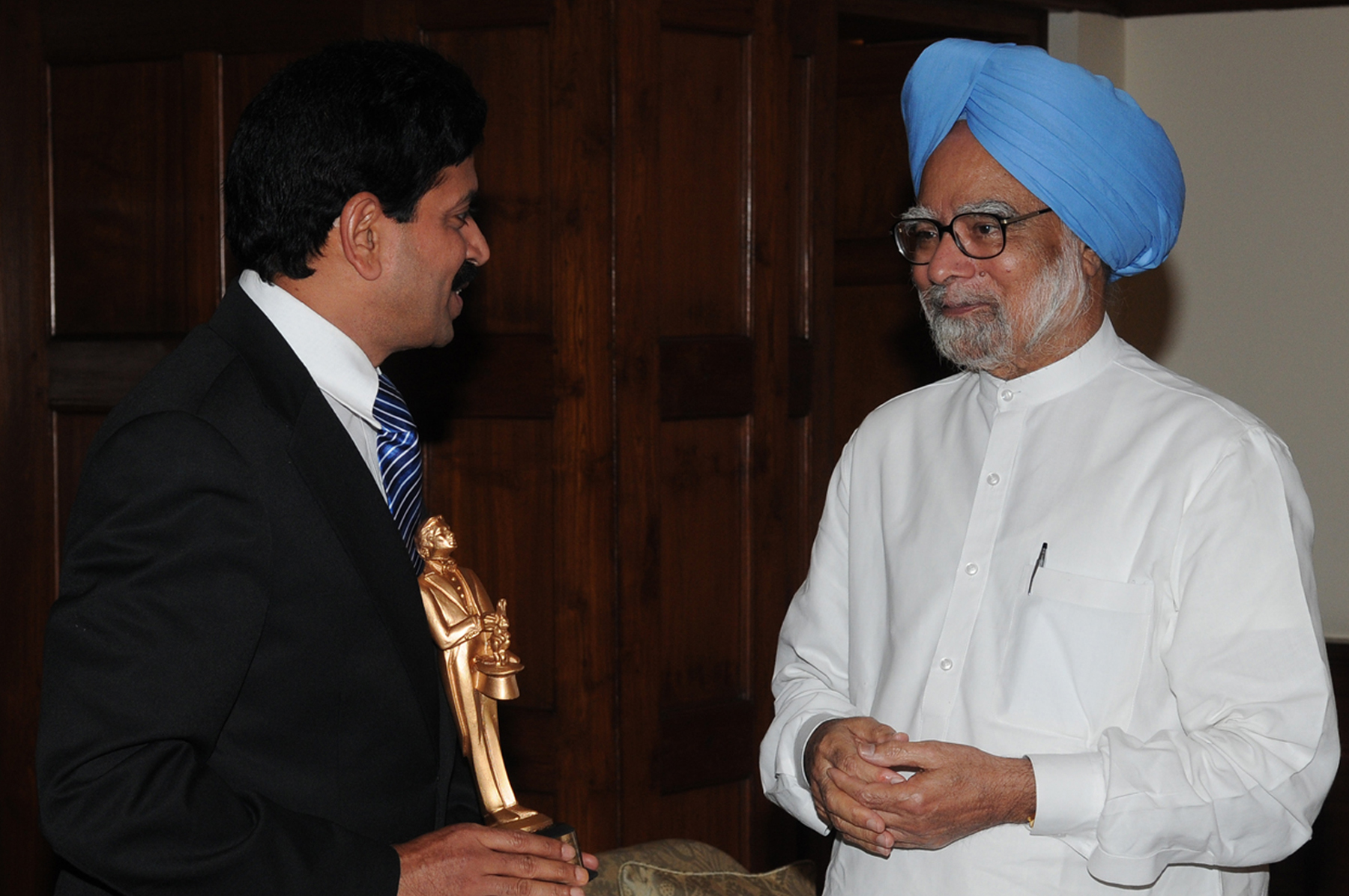
Muthukad with former Prime Minister of India, Manmohan Singh, 2012

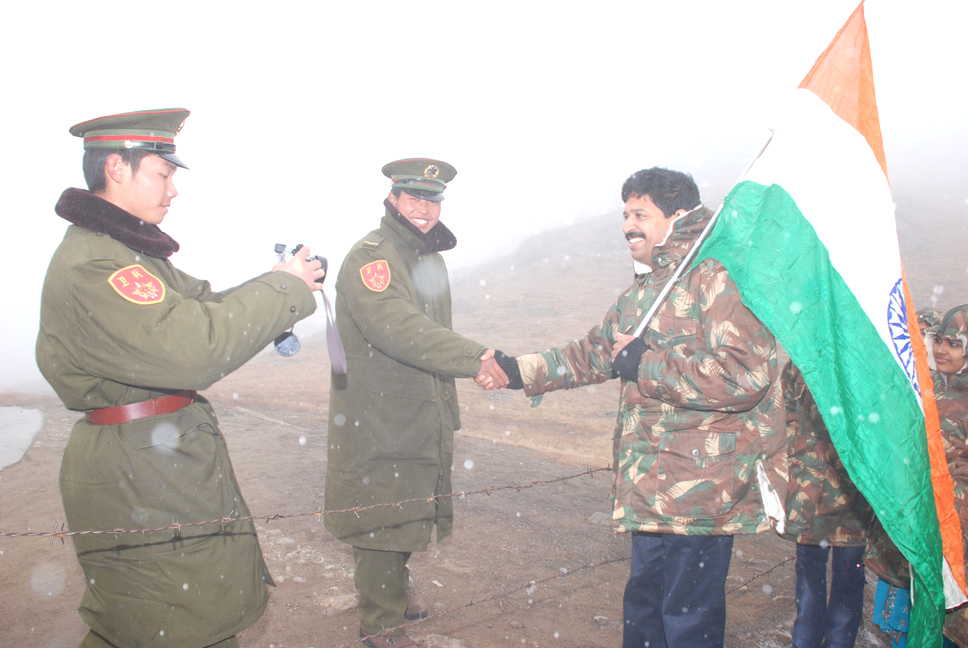
Greeting Chinese soldiers at Nathu La Pass, 14400 feet atop Gangtok, Sikkim, after a magic show.

== Endeavors ==
=== Magic Academy ===
The Academy of Magical Sciences, popularly known as Magic Academy, was established in the year 1996, in Thiruvananthapuram, Kerala. The founder patron was Late Malayattoor Ramakrishnan and after it was late Jnanpith awardee O. N. V. Kurup. And now the torch of leadership is handled by acclaimed film director, Shri. Adoor Gopalakrishnan.

It was established under the Cultural and Charitable Institutions Act, to uplift and promote the art of magic and to spread the message against all kinds of irrational beliefs, superstitions, violence and other evil practices existing in our society.

=== National Voyages ===
Under the leadership of Magic Academy, Gopinath Muthukad has undertaken four national voyages from Kanyakumari to Kashmir which includes Vismay Bharata Yatra (2002), Gandhi Mantra (2005), Vismay Swaraj Yatra (2007) and Mission India (2010) and many state level voyages. All these Yatras have been undertaken with the motives to foster a sense of national integration, to spread the vital messages of Mahatma Gandhi, communal harmony, counter the violence and terrorism existing in our nation, and spread awareness against drug abuse and alcoholism.

In 2024, with the support of Govt. of India, he successfully conducted 5th national awareness voyage ‘Inclusive India’ from Kanyakumari to Kashmir to convey the message of social inclusion of Persons with Disabilities (PwDs). The team travelled through all the states of India covering more than 22,000 kms from October to December 2024.

=== Magic Planet ===
Magic Planet is an organization located in the KINFRA Film & Video Park, which lies at Kazhakkoottam, Thiruvananthapuram. This organization was founded in the year 2014 to promote traditional street magicians by giving them a platform for performing and ensuring their living. It provides magic shows, magic exhibitions, and other cultural programs to both domestic and foreign tourists.

=== Mpower ===
In 2017, Magic Academy with the support of Kerala State Social Security Mission conducted ‘Anuyatra’ campaign to empower the disabled children and bring them to the mainstream of the society. 23 selected children undergone magic training and formed a magic team named ‘MPower’. Inspired by the highly successful performance of the children, Magic Academy decided to establish a permanent performance platform for them -Mpower centre with the support of UNICEF and Kerala Social Security Mission. This centre trains and develops their talents, while ensuring life skills to make them more self-aware and confident. It is for the first time in the world, a permanent magical performance centre has been opened for the specially abled talents. Today, the centre gives training to specially abled children in a mode that they can become breadwinners for their family. Recently, the Mpower team stepped into INDIA BOOK OF RECORDS for their unique performance.

=== Different Art Centre ===
The success of Mpower paved the path in the formation of a Comprehensive Art Centre at Kazhakkuttom, Thiruvananthapuram for disabled children to explore their artistic talents and promote the overall development of disabled community. The centre aims to empower these children by recognizing and sharpening their raw talents through special and appropriate methods. The appreciation from the audience, reaching the centre, increases a sense of confidence and better self-awareness in all participants. The Centre was opened in 2019. Different Art Centre acts as a window of opportunity in identifying, training and refining the basic talents of disabled children in various art forms.

=== UNICEF ===
Gopinath Muthukad has been conferred "Celebrity UNICEF Supporter" status to join the efforts of the UN agency in improving condition and status of children in the state. Muthukad is the first Keralite and the first magician to receive the honour. He was selected for his credibility and ability to communicate critical messages on child rights to a large number of people, particularly mothers, caregivers and youth. He joins hands with UNICEF to provide all children with opportunities to survive, develop and reach their full potential to the benefit of the sustained growth and stability of countries and a global standard of human rights for all.

=== Election Commission of India ===
Muthukad has been designated as State Icon for Kerala by the Election Commission of India, for his activities on creating awareness and motivating the masses to participate in the electoral process. Through his magical shows, he was able to create awareness on the importance of democracy and the need to participate in the electoral processes. He was the first Keralite selected for this honour. He worked as volunteer in the North East State of India where people is reluctant to cooperate in the election process.

=== Magik Homes ===
The MAGIK Homes Project (Making Accessible Gateways for Inclusive Kerala) is an initiative led by Gopinath Muthukad through the Different Art Centre in Thiruvananthapuram, Kerala, India. Launched in June 2024, the project aims to provide accessible, custom-built homes for individuals with disabilities from marginalized communities, addressing their specific housing needs to promote independence and inclusion. The first disability-friendly house under the MAGIK Homes Project was handed over to the family of an 11-year-old disabled child from Maukode by poet and lyricist Kaithapram Damodaran Namboothiri.6

== Awards and achievements ==
- Kerala Sangeetha Nataka Akademi Award, 1995
- Prathibha Pranamam Honour by Kerala State Government, 2000
- Merlin Award from International Magician's Society, 2011
- Celebrity Advocate title from UNICEF for promoting child rights, 2016
- Kerala Icon by Election Commission of India, 2016
- Rashtriya Aavishkar Abhiyan Ambassador, 2016
- Kerala Sangeetha Nataka Akademi Fellowship, 2018
- Leader of the 21st Century finalist by San Francisco University, 2019
- Brand Ambassador for Kerala State Commission for Protection of Child Rights, 2020
- Kerala Sree instituted by Government of Kerala, 2022
- Kunjunni Award, 2022
- State SVEEP Icon of Kerala by the Election Commission of India from 2023 & 2025

== Books ==
- Magic: History, Basics (a book depicting the basics of the art of magic)
- Vazhakunnam Stories (a book depicting the stories of the great legendary magician Vazhakkunnam who was a master to Muthukad)
- Math-Magic (a book on mathematical magic)
- Easy-to-do magic tricks (a book illustrating easy magic tricks for children)
- Ee kadhayilumundoru Magic
- Ormakalude Manthrika Sparsam (Autobiography)
- Magical mist of memories (Autobiography)
- India – Ente Pranaya Vismayam (Travel book)
- India – My spellbound love (Travel book)
- Jeevitham Oru Padhapusthakam
- Magic Lamp

== Television shows ==
Year	Program	Role	Channel	Notes
2009	Vismayam	Host	Kairali TV	
2009-2010	Munch Star singer junior	Judge	Asianet	
2010-2012	Munch Star singer junior season 2	Judge	Asianet	
2011	Evening live show	Himself	DD National	Hindi show
2012	America today	Himself	Kairali TV USA	
2012	Vismayakoodu	Host	Asianet News	
2012-2013	Magic carpet	Host/Magician	Kairali TV	
2014	Little scholar	Quiz master	Media One	
2014	ullu thurannu	Guest	ACV	
2015	Little scholar season 2	Quiz master	Media One	
2015	Little scholar season 3	Quiz master	Media One	
2015-2016	Little scholar season 4	Quiz master	Media One	
2016	Manassiloru Mazhavil	Guest	Kairali TV	
2016	Little scholar season 5	Quiz master	Media One	
2016	Magic planet	Magician	DD Malayalam	
2016-2017	IQ Master	Host	Kaumudy TV	
2018	Charithram Enniloode	Himself	Safari TV	
2018	American lifestyle	Himself	flowers TV USA	
2018	You	Himself	Global TV	
2019	Samoohyapadam	Himself	DD MALAYALAM	
2019	Morning show	Himself	Mediaone	
2019	Sakalakalavallabhan	Judge	Asianet	

== Personal life ==
Muthukad is married to Kavitha and the couple has a son, Vismay Muthukad. He is settled with his family in Thiruvananthapuram.
