= Maneka Sorcar =

Indian magician

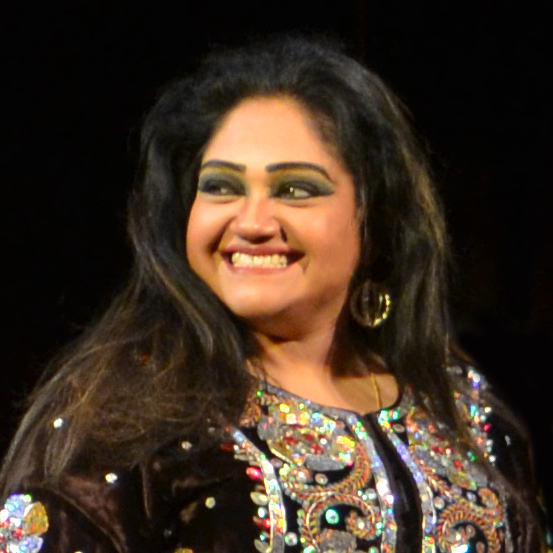
- Born: Parama Sorcar; Kolkata, West Bengal, India
- Occupation: Magician
- Spouse: Susmit Ranjan Haldar

Maneka Sorcar (real name Parama Sorcar) is an Indian magician. She is the elder daughter of P. C. Sorcar Jr. and worked as an assistant to her father in several shows and till March 2012. She has performed over 250 magic shows. Sorcar is married to Susmit Ranjan Haldar. In 2004, Maneka teamed up with her father to create an illusion of a disappearing Taj Mahal, followed by the appearance of a bicycle ride across the surface of Dal Lake.

== Early life ==
Maneka Sorcar is the elder daughter of Prodip C. Sorcar or Magician P.C. Sorcar Jr. and Jayashri Sorcar and the granddaughter of Protul Chandra Sorcar or Magician P.C. Sorcar. Her two younger sisters Moubani Sorcar and Mumtaz Sorcar are film actresses.
