= Indian basket trick =

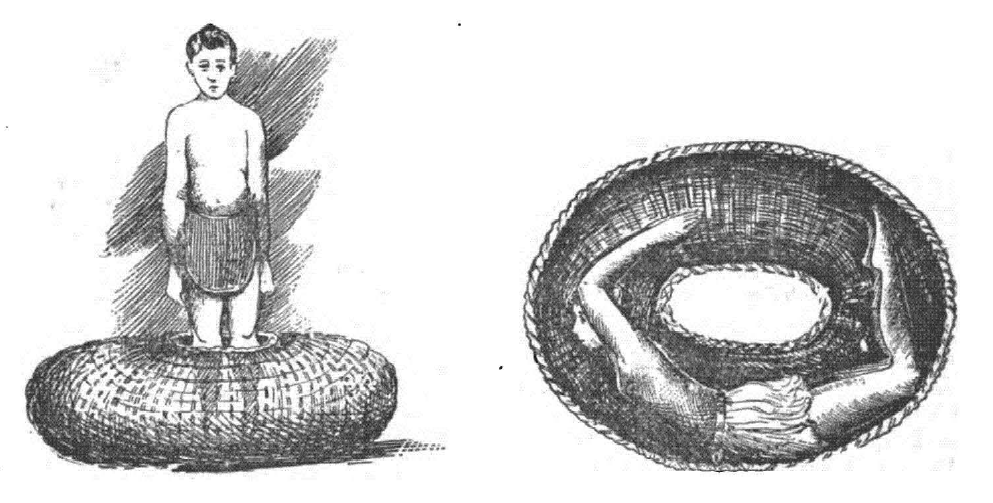
How the trick is performed, Baldwin 1895.

The Indian basket trick, or Hindu basket trick, is a trick with a wicker basket in which an assistant is put into the basket and the performer then puts swords through it. The trick ends while the child or assistant either climbs out of the basket or reappears from behind the crowd unharmed. The Indian basket trick has been used in an adapted form by Western magicians for a long time. It is one of the oldest illusions. It started off being performed in the streets; later, Colonel Stodare adapted it to stage magic. In the old version of the trick, the magician used a real basket for the trick; nowadays, magicians use a box to accomplish the trick.

The secret to the trick was revealed by the magician Samri Baldwin as early as 1895. Baldwin described the trick as a very simple illusion. The boy whilst inside the basket "coils himself around in the bulge or protruding sides of the basket, so that when the Fakeer tramples in the middle or center, he does not trample on the boy... The sword is only put through the basket at certain prearranged places and passes between the boy's legs, between his arms and the body, between the shoulders and the body, or between the shoulders and the neck." As for the boy reappearing outside of the basket behind the crowd, it is not the same boy but a confederate.
