= P. C. Sorcar, Young =

Indian magician

- Born: 1950 (age 75–76); Kolkata, India
- Education: Master's Degree in Mathematics, Calcutta University
- Occupation: Illusionist
- Spouse: Chitra Devi
- Children: Pouroosh, Purnasha
- Website: www.magicianpcsorcaryoung.com

P. C. Sorcar, Young (formal name Provas Chandra Sorcar; born 1950) is an Indian magician based in Kolkata, West Bengal, India. He is the third son of Indian magician P. C. Sorcar. He is the winner of the Samurai Crown for the Best Magic Show in Japan, the Golden Dragon for the Best Magic Show in China, and other international awards.

Sorcar started practicing magic at an early age, learning from his father, P. C. Sorcar. He also learned the sitar from Pandit Guru Asit Ganguly, dance from Guru Uday Shankar, and completed his master's degree in mathematics from the University of Calcutta.

In 1982, he composed a ballet on the life of Emperor Ashoka, called Rhythm of 262 BC. In 2013, he obtained permission from the Government of Assam to make the Saraighat Bridge disappear.

Some of his most famous illusions include: X-Ray Eyes, where he performs seemingly impossible mathematical calculations while blindfolded; The Water of India, where a magic jug replenishes itself endlessly; and The Curse of Chemia, where a draped body levitating in the air is revealed to have vanished.

He has a pilot project named Chhoo Mantar, a feature film on magic that is approximately an hour long

He frequently performs with his son, Pouroosh, known as P. C. Sorcar, Master.
