= International Laser Display Association =

- Abbreviation: ILDA
- Formation: August 16, 1986; 40 years ago
- Type: Nonprofit
- Location: United States
- Official language: English
- Website: www.ilda.com

The International Laser Display Association (ILDA) is the worldwide non-profit trade association and is dedicated to advancing the use of laser displays in art, entertainment and education. It was founded in August 1986. ILDA sponsors an annual conference and the annual ILDA Awards for artistic and technical achievement in laser shows and displays.

While increasing public awareness of laser light shows, the ILDA is also an association that provides a base for laser display companies. The ILDA does not perform laser light shows itself, but its members primarily consist of laser light show hosts or companies that sell equipment and services. Members of the company can work with each other, not as competitors, but as colleagues with whom they can collaborate. Being associated with ILDA, members can have professional backing that will supply information on new technologies regarding safety issues and improved display performance.

== History ==
ILDA was founded on August 16, 1986, at their first organizational meeting in Lake Tahoe. Those founding members who are still active as of 2006 are Tom Harman of LaserNet, Jim Martin of Peachtree Lase, Walt Meador of Laser Rentals, Inc., Todd Rogers of Beamin' Lasers, and Tim Walsh of Laser Spectacles. Originally, the meeting was labeled a gathering of Laser Entertainment Professionals. The first topics that were covered at the meeting included ethical business standards, quality shows, insurance, standardization, market overview, and mission statement. The first officers were Ron Goldstein as president, Walt Meador as Secretary, and Tim Walsh as Treasurer. At the end of the meeting, each company was able to show off their own laser light creations. The most memorable display was when Laser Media and Image Engineering performed their collaboration to prove that cooperation between laser light companies was possible.

In April 2006, the ILDA lobbied for the rights to sell lasers for informational display or entertainment. This requires persuading the FDA Center for Devices and Radiological Health (CDRH) to update the administrative process and ensure laser light shows and displays are safer for the public.

== Image transfer format ==
The International Laser Display Association developed an image format suitable for interchanging image data between laser controllers and laser fixtures. The information may also be stored as frames, which can then be stored on a computer or other controlling device. Companies in charge of the technical committee of ILDA are LaserMedia, Image Engineering, Foresight, and Laser Dream.

== Connector ==
ILDA specifies a hardware interface used to control laser projectors. ISP-DB25 is a DB-25 connector governing the X/Y servo position, per-color output, safety isolators etc.

== Annual Conference and Award Ceremony ==
Every year, the ILDA sponsors a conference and award Ceremony since 1988. These conferences give digital media light show artists the opportunity to network, and showcase their most recent work, while the Award Ceremonies are a place for members to advertise and promote their artistic talent. Companies who have won the most awards are LOBO Electronic, Audio Visual Imagineering, LFI/Laser Fantasy International, Laser Images Inc. ("Laserium") and Laser Medium. Awards include several different Artistic categories and the Fenning Award, which credits technical achievement. But the highest honor of all is the Career Achievement Award, which is based on years of success, innovation, and over all quality of work.

The ILDA Conference started in 1987 and ILDA members and non-members can both participate. The Conference holds the ILDA Awards announcements, the Advanced Technology Workshop, a performance of light shows called the "Lase-off", and seminar and business meetings.
