= P. C. Sorcar Jr. =

Indian magician (born 1946)

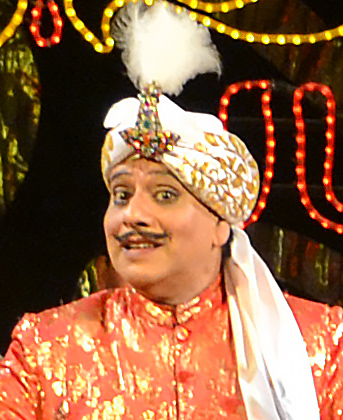
- Born: 31 July 1946 (age 80); Tangail, Bengal Presidency, British India
- Education: University of Calcutta (Ph.D. in Psychology)
- Occupation: Illusionist
- Spouse: Jayashree Devi
- Children: Maneka, Moubani, Mumtaz
- Parent(s): P.C. Sorcar; Basanti Devi

P. C. Sorcar Jr. (formal name Prodip Chandra Sorcar; born 31 July 1946) is an Indian magician based in Kolkata, West Bengal, India. He is the second son of Indian magician P. C. Sorcar. He is also the recipient of Merlin Award in Magic.

He holds a doctorate degree in applied psychology from the University of Calcutta, and holds the record of being the highest individual foreign exchange earner in entertainment.

Sorcar contested the 2014 Indian general election from Barasat as the Bharatiya Janata Party candidate and lost to Kakoli Ghosh Dastidar of Trinamool Congress.

== Family ==
His elder brother Prafulla is an Electrical Engineer and younger brother Provas is a commercial pilot. He lost his father, Padma Shri award-winner Protul Chandra Sorcar (P.C. Sorcar Sr.) at the age of 58 due to a massive heart attack in Japan.

Sorcar married Jayashree, daughter of Sri Aroon Kumar Ghosh and Smt. Nilima Devi on 22 May 1972. The couple have three daughters, Maneka, Moubani and Mumtaz. Maneka is also a magician. Moubani is a model and Mumtaz is a Bengali film actress.

His mother Basanti died on 26 December 2009 while he was performing the magic show in Barasat.

== Indrajal ==
Sorcar's troupe, Indrajal, uses 48 tons of equipment, 75 artists, dozens of settings, 12 jadoo girls, psychedelic laser lighting systems, more than 400 brocade dresses, original music by his own orchestra and more than 50 tricks of illusion.

His earliest stage experience involved him assisting his father at Kolkata's New Empire in 1959. His first solo stage performance was held at Siliguri Railway Institute Hall in 1963. Some of his most famous illusions that continue from his father's legend, include: X-Ray Eyes, where he solves mathematical equations, reads Shakespeare lines and even sketches on the spot, blindfolded. Water of India, where a magic jug keeps replenishing itself endlessly and by the end of the show, there's an entire bucket of water filled through that little jug. A dangerous trick where Sorcar Jr himself gets into a box and gets cut in half, assisted by his wife Jayashree. Upon the cut, they even remove any drapes or cover on the middle body, revealing a complete cut between his upper body and lower body.

Sorcar's signature trick is the use of light refraction to convey the impression that large scale objects have vanished. Past performances have included the "disappearance" of the Taj Mahal and the Indore – Amritsar Express.

On 8 November 2000, Sorcar "vanished" the Taj Mahal for two minutes in Kachhpura in Agra. He also made the Victoria Memorial disappear on the 300th anniversary of Calcutta, and vanished a train full of passengers before a large crowd at Bardhaman Junction, West Bengal, India in 1992.

On 1 April 2020 on fool's day, P C Sorcar disappeared Sahid Minar as a tribute to the magicians of Banga Jadu.

Sorcar Jr has cycled at high speed blindfolded from Trafalgar square in London and created a record.

== Awards ==
- Merlin Award (1998): Given by the International Magicians Society first Indian magician to win it, often called the Oscar of magic.
- Lifetime Achievement Award (2025): Presented by the Indian Magic Academy (IMA) in Visakhapatnam.

== Filmography ==
Gili Gili Ge is a 1989 children's movie directed by Iswar Chakraborty and produced by Indrajaal Production. This classic Bengali movie stars P.C. Sorcar Jr. in a double role. Both the protagonist and the antagonist characters are enacted by him. Utpal Dutt, Santosh Dutta, and Sreela Majumdar also acted in the movie. The movie, a favorite among children and elders, features the charismatic screen presence of Sorcar Jr. and spectacular visual effects.
