= Moubani Sorcar =

Indian actress

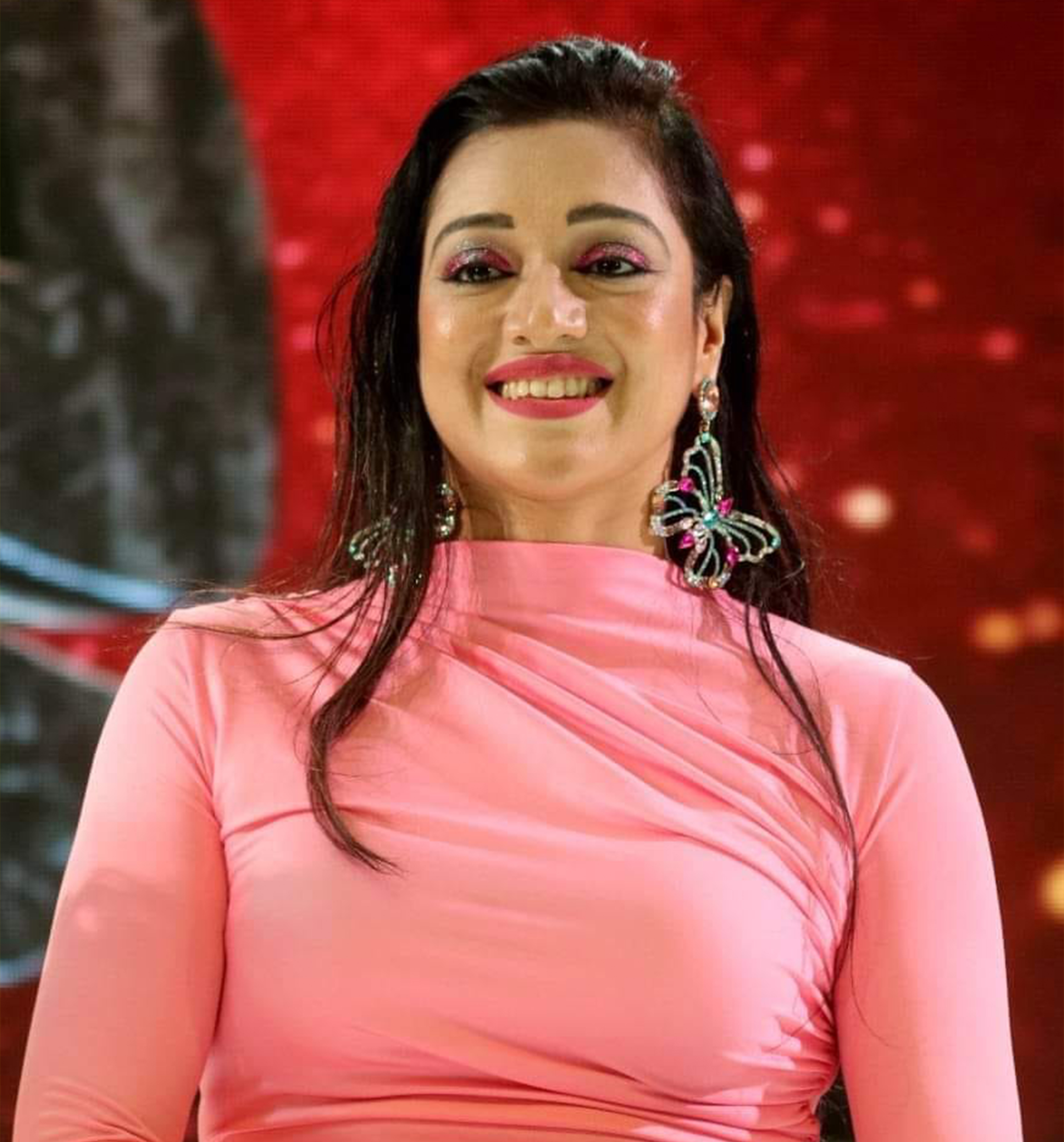
- Born: Purbita Sorcar; 21 October 1987 (age 38); Kolkata, West Bengal
- Occupation: Actress
- Years active: 2009–present
- Parents: P. C. Sorcar Jr. (father); Jayasree Sorcar (mother)

Moubani Sorcar (born Purbita Sorcar on 21 October 1987) is an Indian actress and painter. She is the daughter of magician P. C. Sorcar Jr.

She made her acting debut opposite Prosenjit Chatterjee in Anup Sengupta's Bengali film Badla (2009).

== Filmography ==
Key
†	Denotes films that have not been released yet

Year	Film	Language	Director
2009	Badla	Bengali	Anup Sengupta
2009	Kolir Arjun	Bengali	
2010	Lajja – The Shame	Bengali	Dayal Acharya
2010	Mon Chay Tomay	Bengali	Prabir Kar
2011	Seven Days	Bengali	Tathagata Bhattyacharya
2012	Antore Bahire	Bengali	Somnath Sen
2012	Nadi Re Tui	Bengali	Kingshuk De
2012	Sorry Kono Khama Nei	Bengali	Jeet Chatterjee
2014	Bhoot Adbhoot	Bengali	Anubrata Dutta Sridip Ghosh
2014	Path Ghat	Bengali	Partha Ganguly
2017	Comrade	Bengali	
2018	Sesh Chithi	Bengali	
2018	Silent Signature	Bengali	
2021	Sleelatahanir Pore	Bengali	
	Jotilpurer Goppo †	Bengali	Adhyan Dhara
	Paran Bandhu Re †	Bengali	Biswanath Chakraborty
	Sopno O Bastab †	Bengali	Shyamal Basu
2024	Alor Disha		Partha Ganguly
