= Sarkar (surname) =

Sarkar (or Sorkar) is a surname among the people of the Indian subcontinent. It was an honorific title given to feudal lords, or zamindars, of East India, irrespective of their religious affiliation, under the Mughal Empire and even in Sher Shah's reign, as part of the erstwhile Persian nobility. At present there are Sarkar families in different parts of West Bengal, India as well as in Bangladesh. The surname is mainly used by Bengalis.

The Persian connotation of the word refers to 'chieftain', 'lord', or 'superintendent'. In modern Bangla and Hindi, however, Sarkar refers to government/governance.

== Geographical distribution ==
As of 2014, 79.0% of all known bearers of the surname Sarkar were residents of West Bengal, India and 19.8% were residents of Bangladesh. In India, the frequency of the surname was higher than national average in the following states and union territories:

1. Tripura (1:29)
2. West Bengal (1:55)
3. Andaman and Nicobar Islands (1:99)
4. Assam (1:207)

== Notable people ==
Notable people with the family name of Sarkar include:

=== Academics ===
- Benoy Kumar Sarkar (1887–1949), Indian social scientist, professor, and nationalist
- Jadunath Sarkar (1870–1958), Indian aristocrat and historian
- Dr. Nilratan Sarkar (1861 – 1943), an Indian medical doctor, educationist, philanthropist and swadeshi entrepreneur.
- Lotika Sarkar (1923–2013), Indian feminist, social worker, educator and lawyer
- Mahendralal Sarkar (1833–1904), Indian doctor, social reformer, and propagator of scientific studies
- Maqbular Rahman Sarkar (1928–1985), Bangladeshi academic and tenth vice-chancellor of Rajshahi University
- Palash Sarkar (born 1969), Indian mathematician and academic
- Peary Charan Sarkar (1823–1875), Indian educationist and textbook writer
- Prabhat Ranjan Sarkar (1921–1990), Indian social and spiritual philosopher
- Sahotra Sarkar (born 1962), Bengali-American philosopher of science and conservation biologist
- Sameer P. Sarkar, British psychiatrist
- Satyabrata Sarkar (born 1928) Indian biologist
- Soumodip Sarkar (born 1965), Indian economist and management researcher
- Sucharit Sarkar (born 1983), Indian mathematician
- Sumit Sarkar (born 1939), Indian historian
- Susobhan Sarkar (1900–1982), Indian historian and academic
- Tanika Sarkar, Indian historian
- Sisir Kumar Sarkar (born 1953), Indian scientist
- Tapan Sarkar (1948–2021), Indian-American electrical engineer
- Deblina Sarkar, Indian electrical engineer

=== Literature ===
- Akshay Chandra Sarkar (1846–1917), Indian poet, editor and literary critic
- Pabitra Sarkar (born 1937), Indian Bengali linguist, writer, literary critic, and academician
- Arunabh Sarkar (born 1941), Bangladeshi poet, and literary Editor
- Subodh Sarkar (born 1958), Indian Bengali poet

=== Politicians ===
- Abdul Bari Sarkar, Bangladeshi politician and former member of parliament
- Abdullah Sarkar (1942–2013), Bangladeshi politician and former member of parliament
- Abdul Malek Sarkar (1951–2023), Bangladeshi politician and former member of parliament
- Abdul Matin Sarkar, Bangladeshi politician and former member of parliament
- Abu Hussain Sarkar (1894–1969), Chief Minister of East Pakistan
- Aftab Uddin Sarkar (born 1950), Bangladeshi politician and former member of parliament
- Ajit Sarkar (1947–1998), Indian politician, member of Communist Party of India (Marxist)
- Amzad Hossain Sarker (1958–2021), Bangladeshi politician and former member of parliament
- Ataur Rahman Sarkar (born 1951), Bangladeshi politician and former member of parliament
- Azharul Islam Sarkar (1944–1996), Bangladeshi politician and former member of parliament
- Dilip Sarkar (Tripura politician) (1958–2019), Indian politician
- Emran Ali Sarkar (1913–2007), Bangladeshi minister of Relief and Rehabilitation
- Eunus Ali Sarkar (1953–2019), Bangladeshi politician and former member of parliament
- Habib Ullah Sarkar, Bangladeshi politician and former member of parliament
- Hamiduzzaman Sarkar, Bangladeshi politician and former member of parliament
- Hasan Uddin Sarkar, Bangladeshi politician and former member of parliament
- Hemanta Kumar Sarkar (1896–1952), Indian writer, linguist and politician
- Jagannath Sarkar (1919–2011), Indian Communist leader, freedom fighter, and writer
- Jahangir Alam Sarkar (born 1955), Bangladeshi politician and former member of parliament
- Manik Sarkar (born 1949), Chief Minister of Tripura from 1998 to 2018
- Mansur Ali Sarkar, Bangladeshi lawyer, politician and former member of parliament
- Matilal Sarkar (born 1941), Indian politician from the Communist Party of India (Marxist)
- Md. Naosher Ali Sarkar (1949–2015), Bangladeshi politician and former member of parliament
- Md. Waheduzzaman Sarkar, Bangladeshi politician and former member of parliament
- Mohammad Ali Sarkar, Bangladeshi politician and former member of parliament
- Muhammad Jamiruddin Sircar (born 1931), Bangladeshi barrister and politician
- Mohammad Owais Sarkar, East Pakistani advocate and politician
- Moin Uddin Sarkar, Bangladeshi politician and former member of parliament
- Nalini Ranjan Sarkar (1882–1953), Indian businessman, industrialist and politician
- Rafiq Uddin Sarkar (died 1981), Bangladeshi politician and former member of parliament
- Rezaul Haque Sarkar, Bangladeshi advocate and politician
- Shaheda Sarkar, Bangladeshi politician and former member of parliament
- Shahiduzzaman Sarker (born 1955), Bangladeshi parliamentary whip and state minister
- Shamsul Hossain Sarkar, Bangladeshi politician and former member of parliament
- Zakir Hossain Sarkar (born 1960), Bangladeshi politician and former member of parliament
- Muhammad Mansur Ali Sarkar (16 January 1917 – 3 November 1975), 3rd Prime Minister of Bangladesh
- Mohammad Selim Sarkar (1940–2015), politician
- Mohammed Nasim Sarkar (1948–2020), government minister
- Tanvir Shakil Sarkar Joy (born 1976), politician
- Mahtabuddin Sarker (1903–1973), magistrate
- Fasihuddin Mahtab Sarker (died 2008), researcher and technocrat minister

=== Sportspeople ===
==== Footballers ====
- Anupam Sarkar (born 1985), Indian footballer from West Bengal
- Gautam Sarkar (born 1950), Indian footballer
- Krishna Rani Sarkar (born 2001), Bangladeshi footballer
- Tirthankar Sarkar (born 1993), Indian footballer

==== Cricketers ====
- Abdul Hannan Sarkar (born 1982), Bangladeshi cricketer
- Soumya Sarkar (born 1993), Bangladeshi cricketer
- Sourav Sarkar (born 1984), Indian cricketer
- Hannan Sarkar (born 1982), Bangladeshi test cricketer
- Uttam Sarkar (born 1986), Bangladeshi cricketer
- Satya Sarkar, Indian cricketer from Assam
- Beas Sarkar (born 1979), Indian cricketer

==== Badminton players ====
- Manoj Sarkar (born 1990), Indian para-badminton player

=== Journalists ===
- Ash Sarkar (born 1992), British journalist and political activist
- Ashok Kumar Sarkar (1912–1983), eighth editor-in-chief and owner of Anandabazar Patrika and the ABP Group
- Aveek Sarkar (born 1945), Indian newspaper owner, editor-in-chief of Anandabazar Patrika and The Telegraph

=== Entertainers ===
- Badal Sarkar (1925–2011), Indian dramatist and theatre director
- Bijoy Sarkar (1903–1985), Baul singer, lyricist and composer
- Joy Sarkar (born 1972), Indian music director and songwriter
- Laboni Sarkar (born 1962), Bengali film and television actress
- Payel Sarkar (born 1985), Indian film and television actress
- Pradeep Sarkar (born 1955), writer and director
- Priyanka Sarkar (born 1990), Bengali film and television actress
- Sohini Sarkar (born 1986), film and television actress

=== Gurus ===
- Prabhat Ranjan Sarkar (1921–1990), Indian Guru of Ananda Marga

=== Judges ===
- Amal Kumar Sarkar (1901–2001), 8th Chief Justice of India

== See also ==
- Sarkar (disambiguation)
- Sarker
- Sircar
- Sorcar
