= Qarapirimli =

Qarapirimli or Karapirimli or Kararpirum or Karapirili may refer to:

- Qarapirimli, Agdam, Azerbaijan
- Qarapirimli, Goranboy, Azerbaijan
