= Qırıqlı =

Qırıqlı or Kyrykhly or Kyrykly may refer to:

- Qırıqlı, Goranboy, Azerbaijan
- Qırıqlı, Goygol, Azerbaijan
