= Gülməmmədli =

Gülməmmədli or Gyul’mamedli or Gul’mamedly or Gyulmamedly may refer to:

- Gülməmmədli, Goranboy, Azerbaijan
- Gülməmmədli, Jalilabad, Azerbaijan
