= Abdul Halim (communist) =

Indian politician

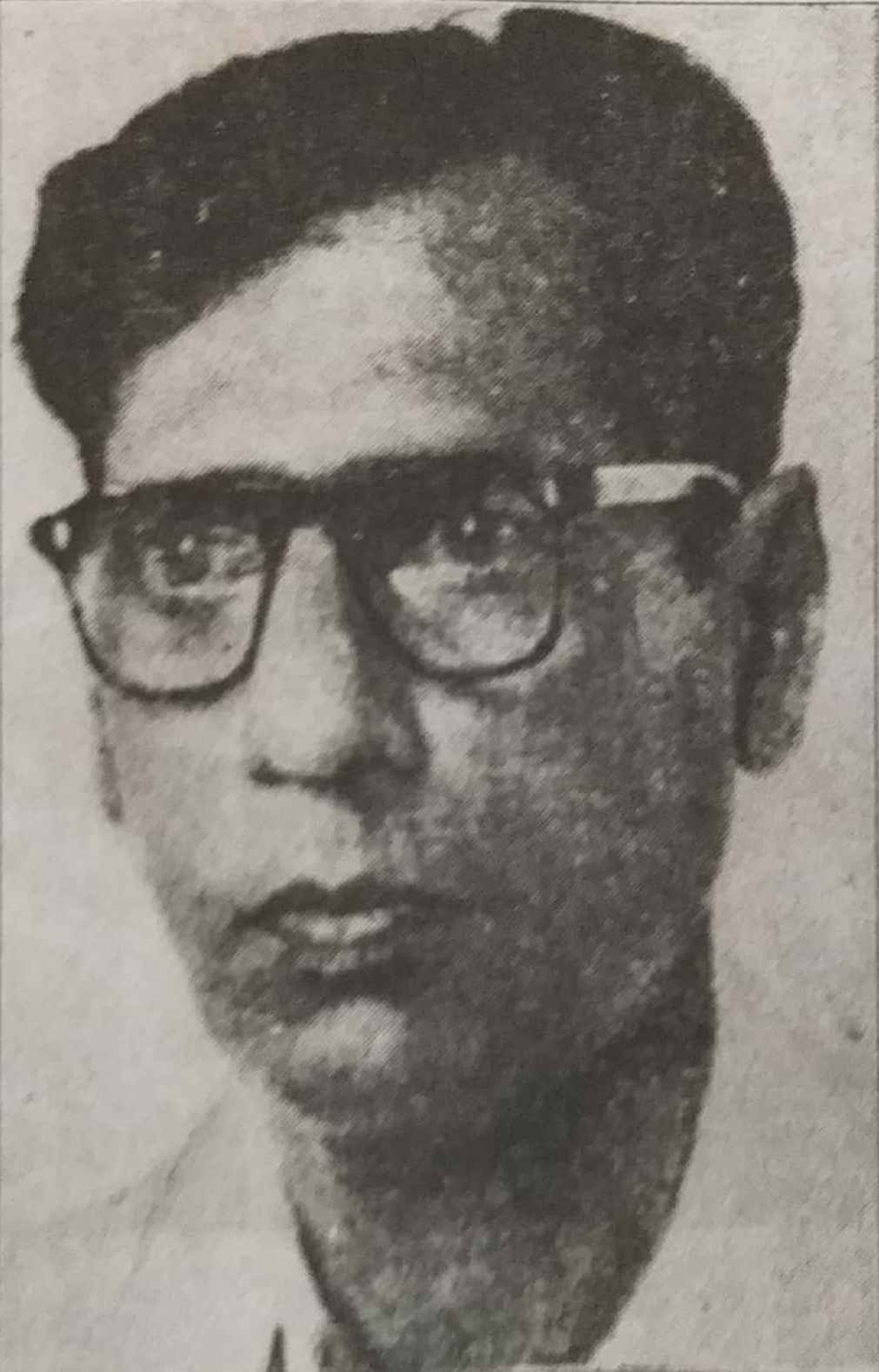

Member of the West Bengal Legislative Council
- In office 1952–1966

Personal details
- Born: 6 December 1901 Burdwan district, Bengal Presidency, British Raj
- Died: 29 April 1966 (aged 64)
- Party: Communist Party of India; Communist Party of India (Marxist)

Abdul Halim (6 December 1901 – 29 April 1966) was an Indian politician, and communist activist. He was a member of the West Bengal Legislative Council from 1952 to 1966.

== Early life ==
Abdul Halim was born on 6 December 1901 to a Bengali Muslim family in the village of Keuburi in Burdwan district, located in the Bengal Province of the British Raj. His father, Abul Husayn, was an employee of the Zamindars of Kirnahar, and his grandfather, Munshi Abdul Baset, was a circle inspector for Calcutta Police.

After studying up to class IX at Shivachandra High School in Kirnahar, he left home and came to Calcutta, working as a labourer on a ship for some time. During this time, he achieved outstanding proficiency in the Bengali and English languages on his own initiative. He regularly went to the general library and practised his studies. Due to lack of funds, he was unable to complete his secondary education.

== Political movement ==
In 1921, he joined Mahatma Gandhi's non-cooperation movement and was imprisoned. After his release, he made contact with Muzaffar Ahmad and Addur Rezzak Khan; and joined the Workers and Peasants Party. He was involved in the publication of Langal by Kazi Nazrul Islam and Ganabani by Muzaffar Amhad. When (1929-1936) Ahmad and others were imprisoned in the Meerut Conspiracy Case, he worked to organise the Communist Party. In 1933–34, he was influential in reshaping the CPI Central Committee. In 1925, he co-founded the Labor Swaraj Party alongside Hemant Kumar Sarkar, writer Naresh Chandra Sengupta, and advocate Atul Gupta. On the initiative of publishing communist literature, he founded Ganashakti Publishing House. He has been imprisoned several times for his involvement with the tram, the food movement, and his writing. From 1952 until his death on 29 April 1966, he was a member of the West Bengal Legislative Council.

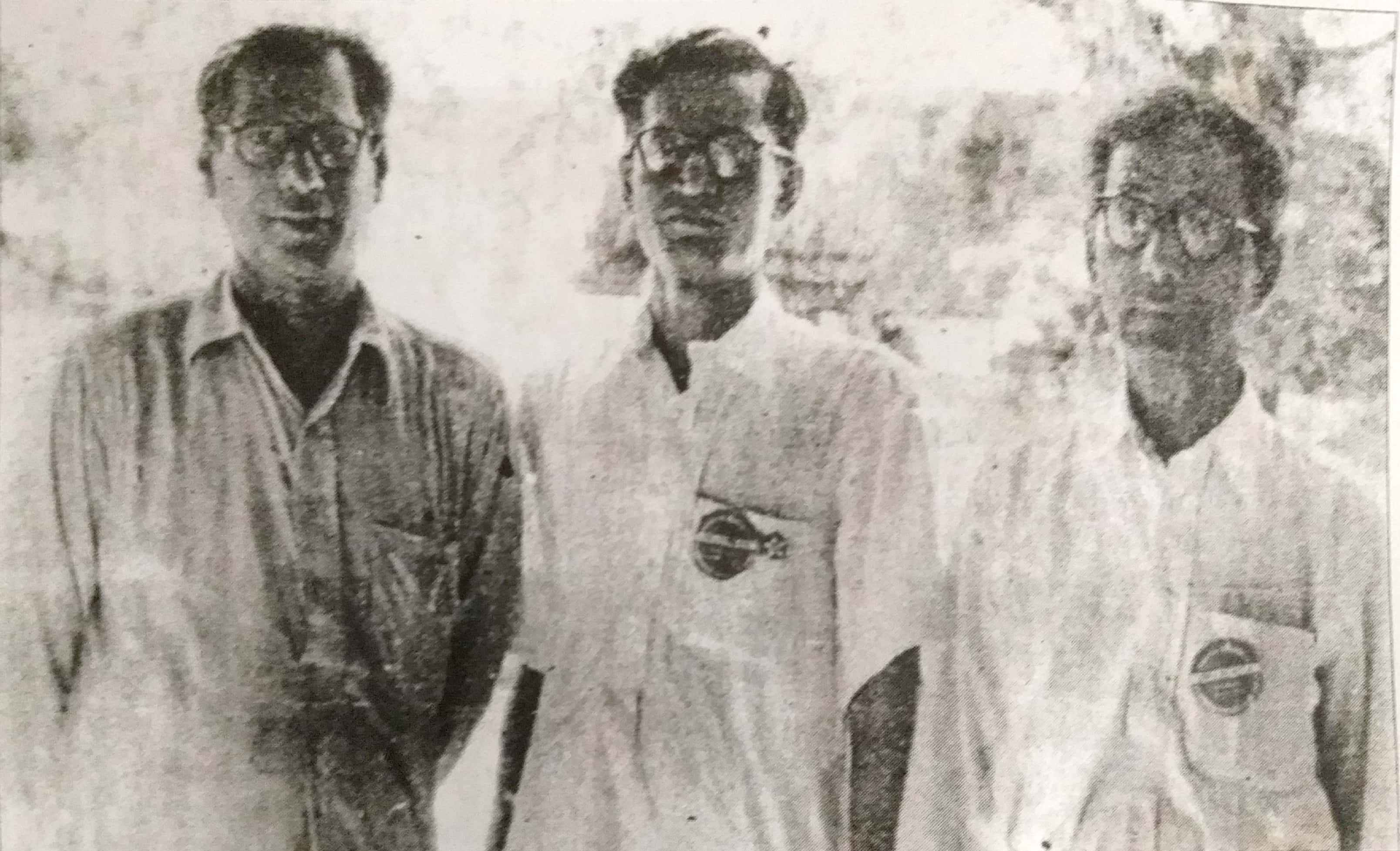
Abdul Halim, Saroj Mukherjee, Muzaffar Ahmed (From left to right) at Chandarnagore

== Books ==
He wrote some books on communism, including

- Tikasaha Communist Ishtahar (টীকা সহ কমিউনিস্ট ইশতেহার)
- Russiar Ganaandolan (রুশিয়ার গণ-আন্দোলন)
- Communism (কমিউনিজম)
