= Sərkar =

Sərkar or Sarkyar may refer to:

- Sərkar, Goygol, Azerbaijan
- Sərkar, Samukh, Azerbaijan
