= Sarkar =

Sarkar may refer to:

- Sarkar (surname), including a list of people with the name
- Sarkar (film series), a series of Indian political crime thriller films
  - Sarkar (2005 film), the first film in the series
- Sarkar (2018 film), an Indian Tamil-language film starring Vijay
  - Sarkar (soundtrack), a soundtrack album from the 2018 film
- Sarkar (administrative division), a historical administrative unit, mostly in the Mughal states of India
- 25630 Sarkar, a main-belt asteroid

== See also ==
- Sərkar (disambiguation), several places in Azerbaijan
- Sarkaria (disambiguation)
- Sircar, a list of people with the surname
- Sorcar, a list of people from the same family
