= Bankim Mukherjee =

Indian politician

- বঙ্কিম মুখোপাধ্যায়
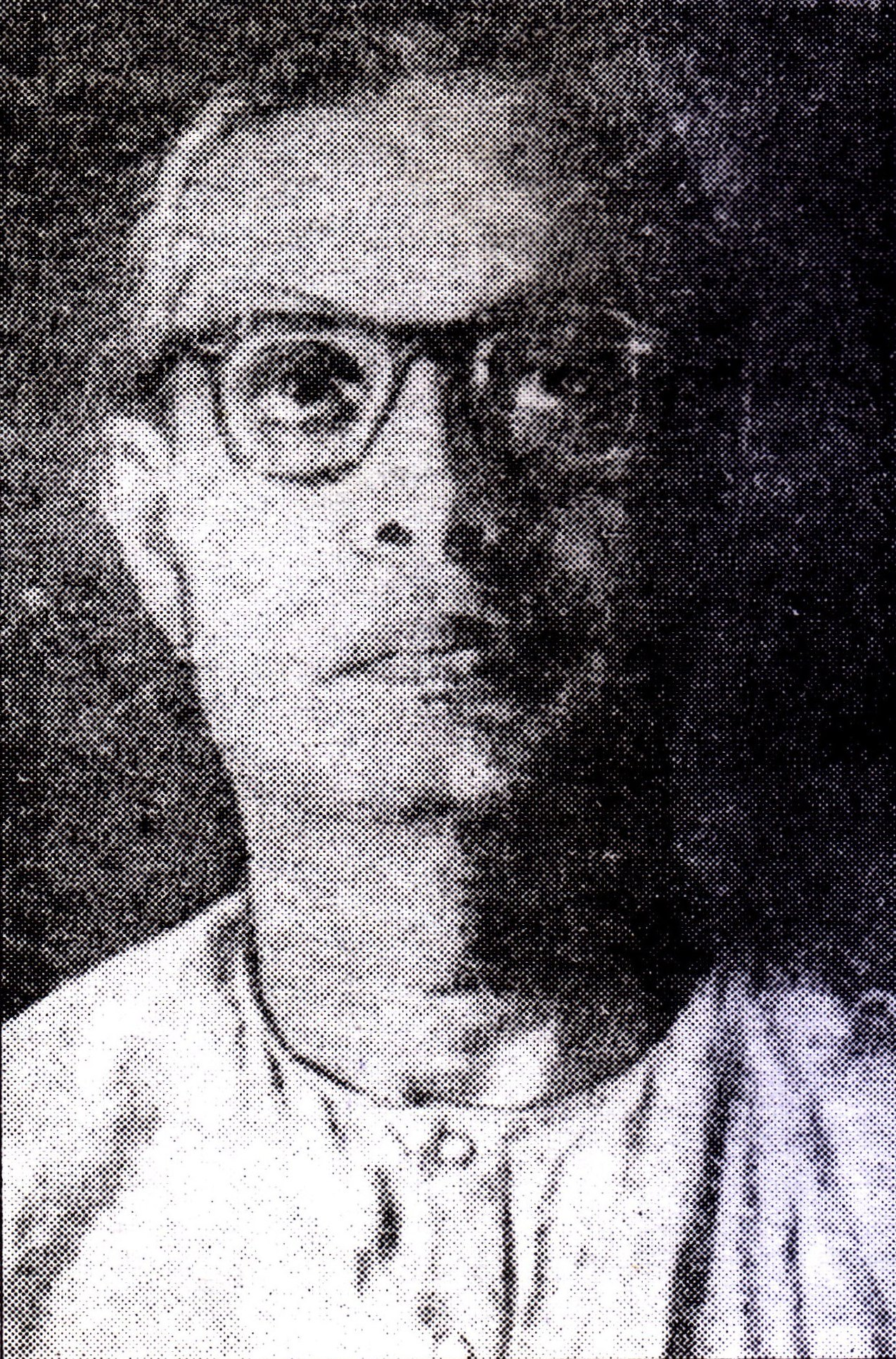

Member of West Bengal Legislative Assembly
- In office 1952–1957; 1957–1961
- Preceded by: Constituency created
- Succeeded by: Harolal Haldar
- Constituency: Budge Budge

Member of Bengal Legislative Assembly
- In office 1936
- Constituency: Asansol Labour Constituency

President of All India Kisan Sabha
- In office 1943

Personal details
- Born: 5 May 1896 Belur, Howrah, Bengal Presidency, British India
- Died: 15 November 1961 (aged 65)
- Citizenship: India
- Party: Communist Party of India
- Spouse: Shanta Bhalerao

Bankim Mukherjee (c. 1896–1961) was an Indian Bengali communist politician. He had taken part in the Civil Disobedience Movement, the Indian Communist movement and had organized various trade unions and Kisan sabhas (Farmers' organization). His wife Shanta Bhalerao was the Assistant Secretary of All India Trade Union Congress.

Mukherjee became politically active in the 1920s, taking part in the Civil Disobedience Movement and jute mill workers union struggles in Bengal. In 1921 Mukherjee went to Etawah with his friend Radharaman Mitra and participated in Non-cooperation movement. They were arrested and imprisoned. After being released from jail. he returned to Bengal following the order of Motilal Nehru and started working for Congress Swaraj Party.

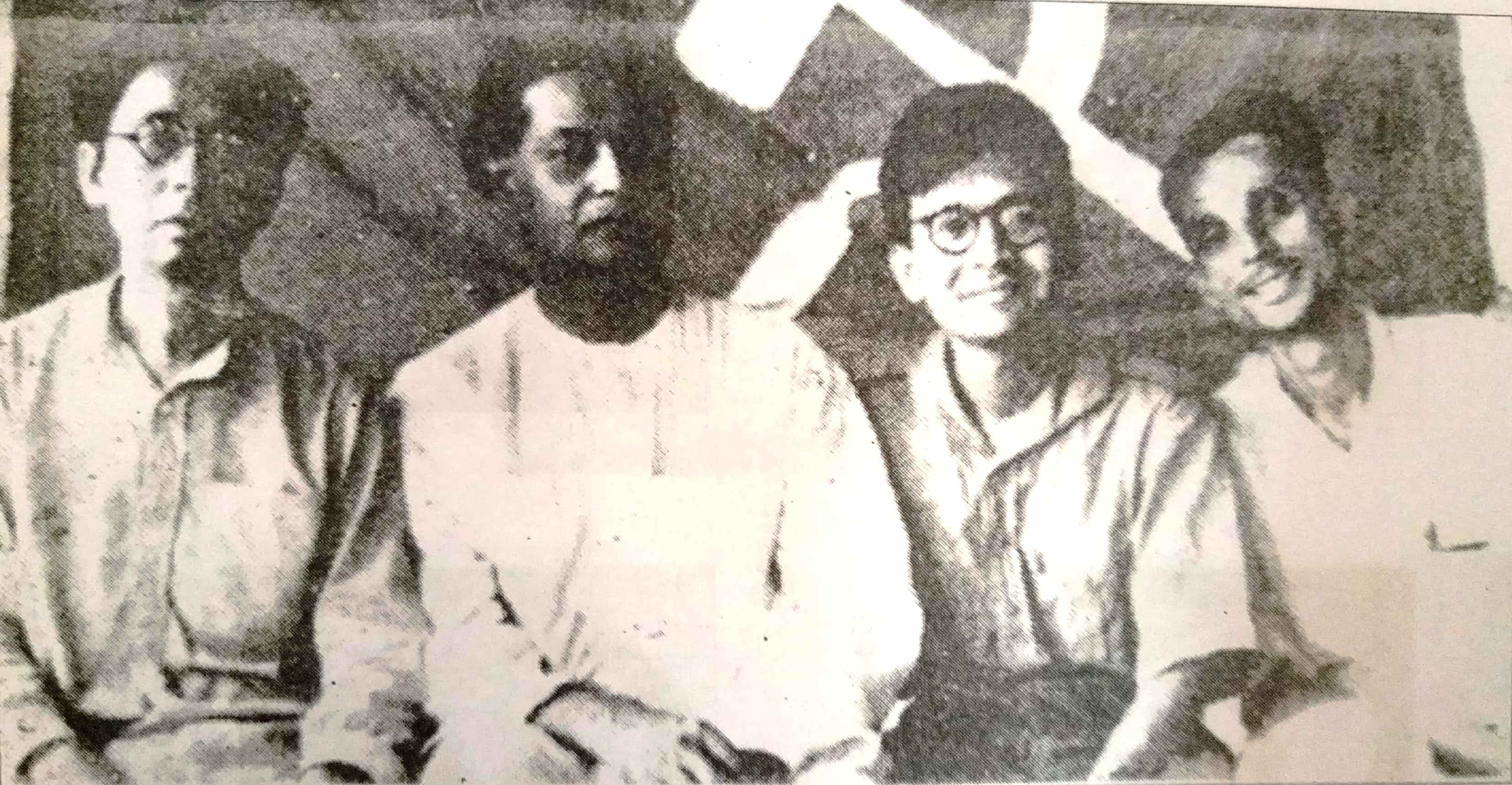
Muzaffar Ahmed, Bankim Mukherjee, PC Joshi, Somnath Lahiri at Calcutta 1937

He got attracted to communism after meeting Bhupendranath Dutta. He got involved in farmers and workers movement. He had organized worker strikes with Abdul Momin (Trade union activist) and Abdur Rezzak Khan. He became a member of the Communist Party of India in 1936. In 1937 he was elected to the Bengal Legislative Assembly, becoming the first member of the Communist Party of India to be elected to legislature. After the First All India Congress of CPI in 1943, he was elected the President of All India Kisan Sabha. He also served as vice-president and general secretary of the All India Kisan Sabha.

He was elected to the West Bengal Legislative Assembly from Budge Budge in 1952 and 1957.

He died on 15 November 1961 at the age of 65.
