= Radharaman Mitra =

Indian politician

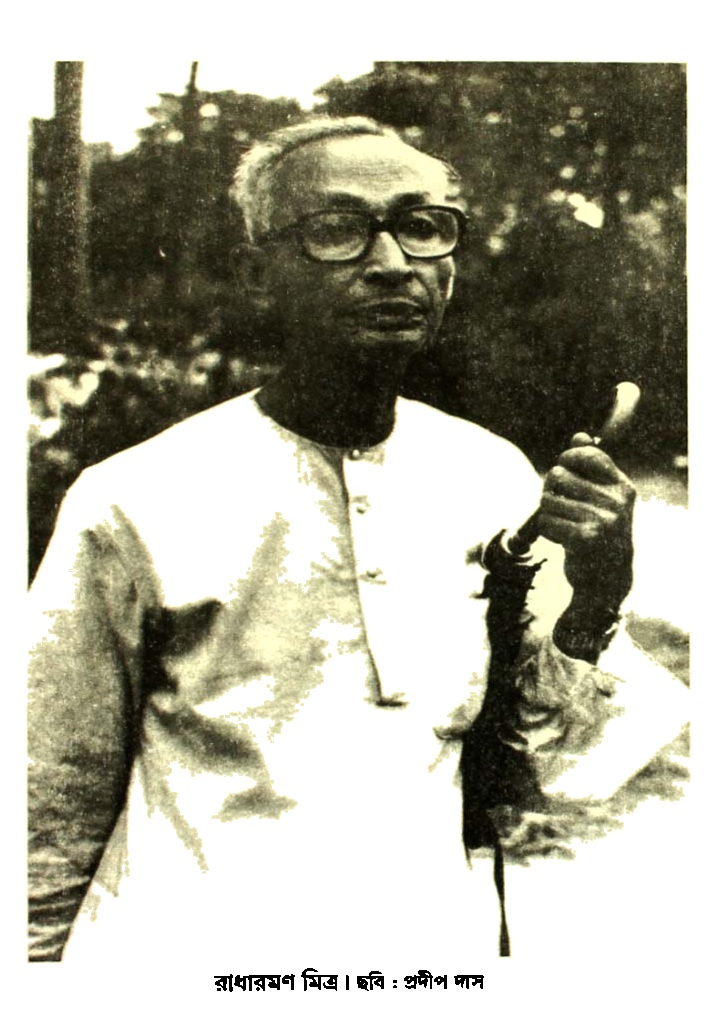
Radharaman Mitra

Radharaman Mitra (23 February 1897 – 7 February 1992) was an Indian revolutionary involved with Meerut Conspiracy Case and Bengali writer. In 1981, he received Sahitya Akademi Award for his book Kalikata Darpan.

== Early life ==
Mitra was born in Shyambazar, Kolkata in a Bengali lower middle class family. He passed Matriculation examination from Hindu School, Kolkata in 1913 and passed Intermediate with Gold medal in 1915. In 1917 he completed his graduation from St. Paul's Cathedral Mission College.

== Revolutionary activities ==
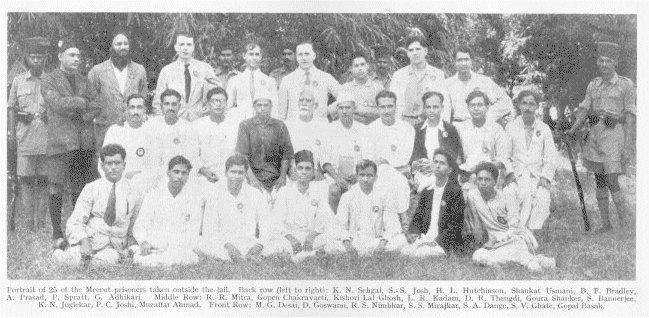
Portrait of 25 of the Meerut prisoners taken outside the jail. Back row (left to right): K. N. Sehgal, S. S. Josh, H. L. Hutchinson, Shaukat Usmani, B. F. Bradley, A. Prasad, P. Spratt, G. Adhikari. Middle row: R. R. Mitra, Gopen Chakravarti, Kishori Lal Ghosh, L. R. Kadam, D. R. Thengdi, Goura Shanker, S. Bannerjee, K. N. Joglekar, P. C. Joshi, Muzaffar Ahmad. Front row: M. G. Desai, D. Goswami, R. S. Nimbkar, S. S. Mirajkar, S. A. Dange, S. V. Ghate, Gopal Basak.

Mitra joined in the Non-cooperation movement while taking his Master of Arts degree in the University of Calcutta. He went to Etawah with his friend another revolutionary Bankim Mukherjee to organise grass route people in support of Gandhism. In 1921 he was arrested and imprisoned in Naini jail for one year. After release Mitra personally met with Mahatma Gandhi at Sabarmati Ashram and worked with him continuously three years. In 1927, he established the Kolkata Corporation Teachers Association while teaching in a School in Kolkata. After that he participated in trade union movements, constructed labour organisation in various area of West Bengal. Police again arrested Mitra in Meerat Conspiracy Case but he was released by order of Allahabad High Court. In 1943–1944 Mitra joined in the Communist Party of India. He was popular for his Marxist intellectualism, literary works and enormous knowledge about history of Calcutta metropolis. He was also a member Bharat Soviet Suhrid Samity established in 1941. He resigned from the active politics since 1951.

== Works ==
- Bangalar Tin Manishi
- Kalikatay Vidyasagar
- Kalikata Darpan (Vol I, II)
- David Hare: His life and works
- Radharaman Mitrer Prabandha
