= Muzaffar Ahmad =

Indian politician

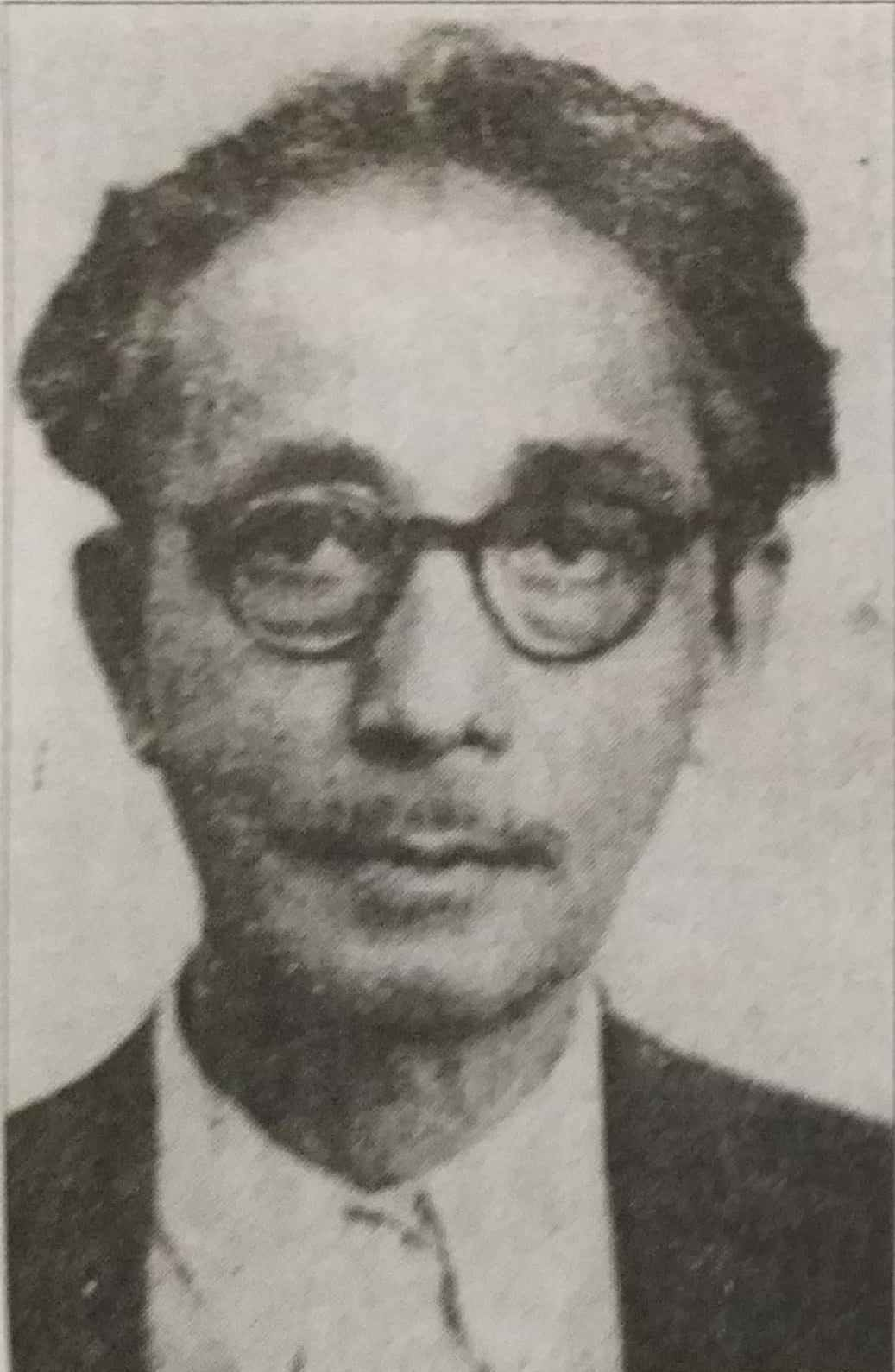
- Pronunciation: [muzɔfːɔr aɦmɔd̪]
- Born: 5 August 1889; Sandwip, Chittagong District, Bengal Presidency, British India (current day Bangladesh)
- Died: 18 December 1973 (aged 84); Calcutta, West Bengal, India
- Other name: Kakababu
- Political party: Communist Party of India (Marxist); Communist Party of India (1925-1964); Workers and Peasants Party (1925)

Muzaffar Ahmad (Note: Bengali pronunciation: [muzɔfːɔr aɦmɔd̪].) (Bengali pronunciation: [muzɔfːɔr aɦmɔd̪]; known as Kakababu; 5 August 1889 – 18 December 1973) was an Indian-Bengali politician, journalist and a co-founder of the Communist Party of India.

== Background ==
Ahmed was born on 5 August 1889 at Musapur village on Sandwip Island in Chittagong District of Bengal Province in the-then British India (in present-day Bangladesh) to Mansur Ali. Ahmed received his early education on Sandwip. He passed matriculation from Noakhali Zilla School in 1913. He studied at Hooghly Mohsin College and then Bangabasi College, but was unsuccessful in the Intermediate in Arts examination and left college.

== Career ==
He participated in political meetings and demonstrations starting in 1916. In 1918, he was appointed assistant secretary of the literary society Bangiya Mussalman Sahitya Samiti and took responsibility for producing its monthly journal. In 1920, along with Kazi Nazrul Islam, he started a new magazine, Nabajug. Later, when another magazine, Dhumketu, was launched by Nazrul in 1922, he contributed to it using the pseudonym "Dwaipayana".

Ahmed was one of the founders of the Communist Party of India. In 1922, the Bharat Samyatantra Samiti was formed in Calcutta with Ahmed as its secretary. In 1924, he was sentenced to four years in prison because of his role in the Kanpur Bolshevik Conspiracy Case along with Shripad Amrit Dange, Nalini Gupta and Shaukat Usmani. He was released due to illness in 1925. In November 1925, he, along with Kazi Nazrul Islam, Hemanta Kumar Sarkar, and others, organised the Labour Swaraj Party in Bengal. He was one of the main leaders of CPI in the early 1920s, along with Abdul Halim and Abdur Rezzak Khan.

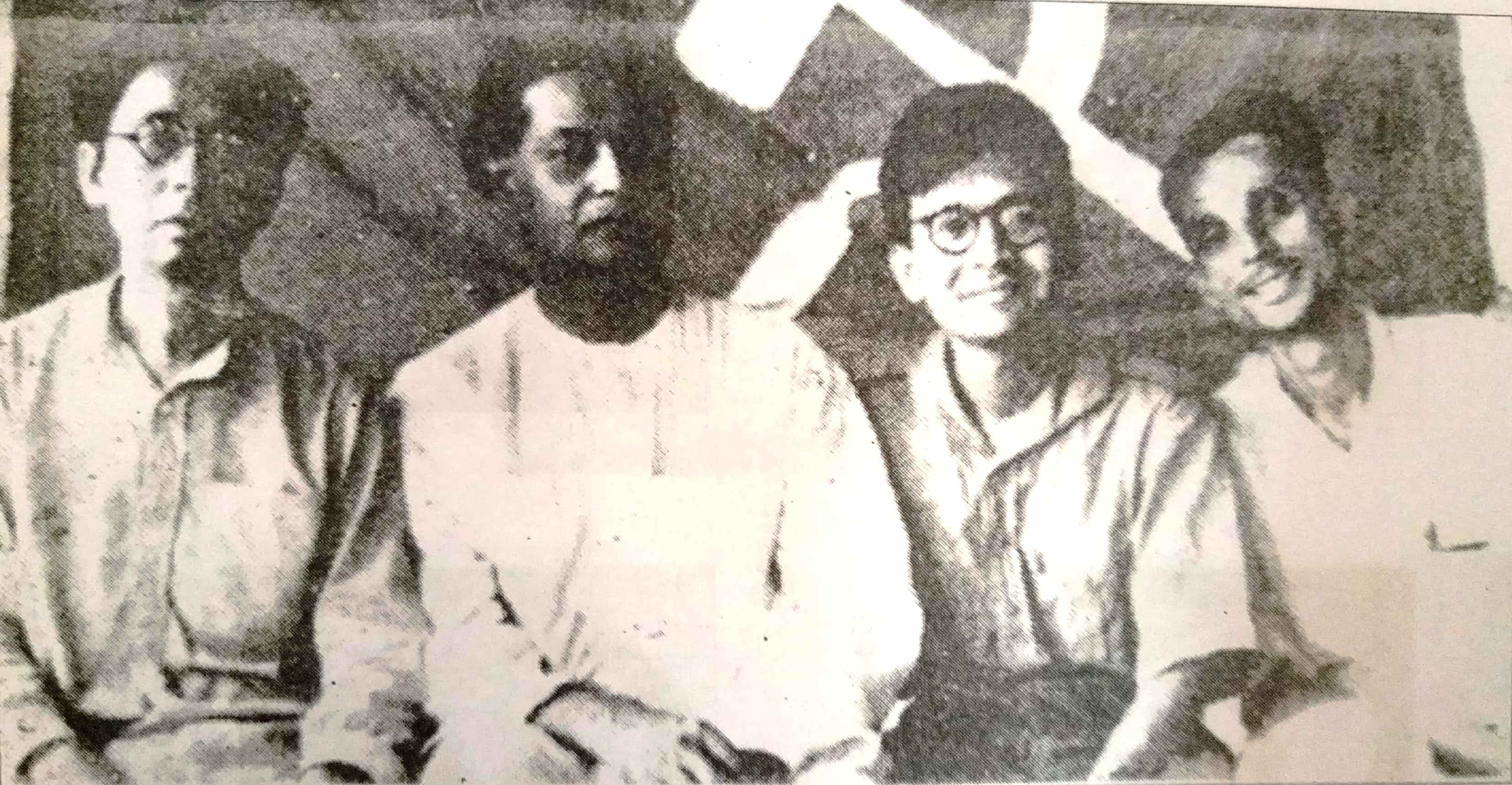
(From left to right) Muzaffar Ahmed, Bankim Mukherjee, P. C. Joshi, and Somnath Lahiri at Calcutta 1937

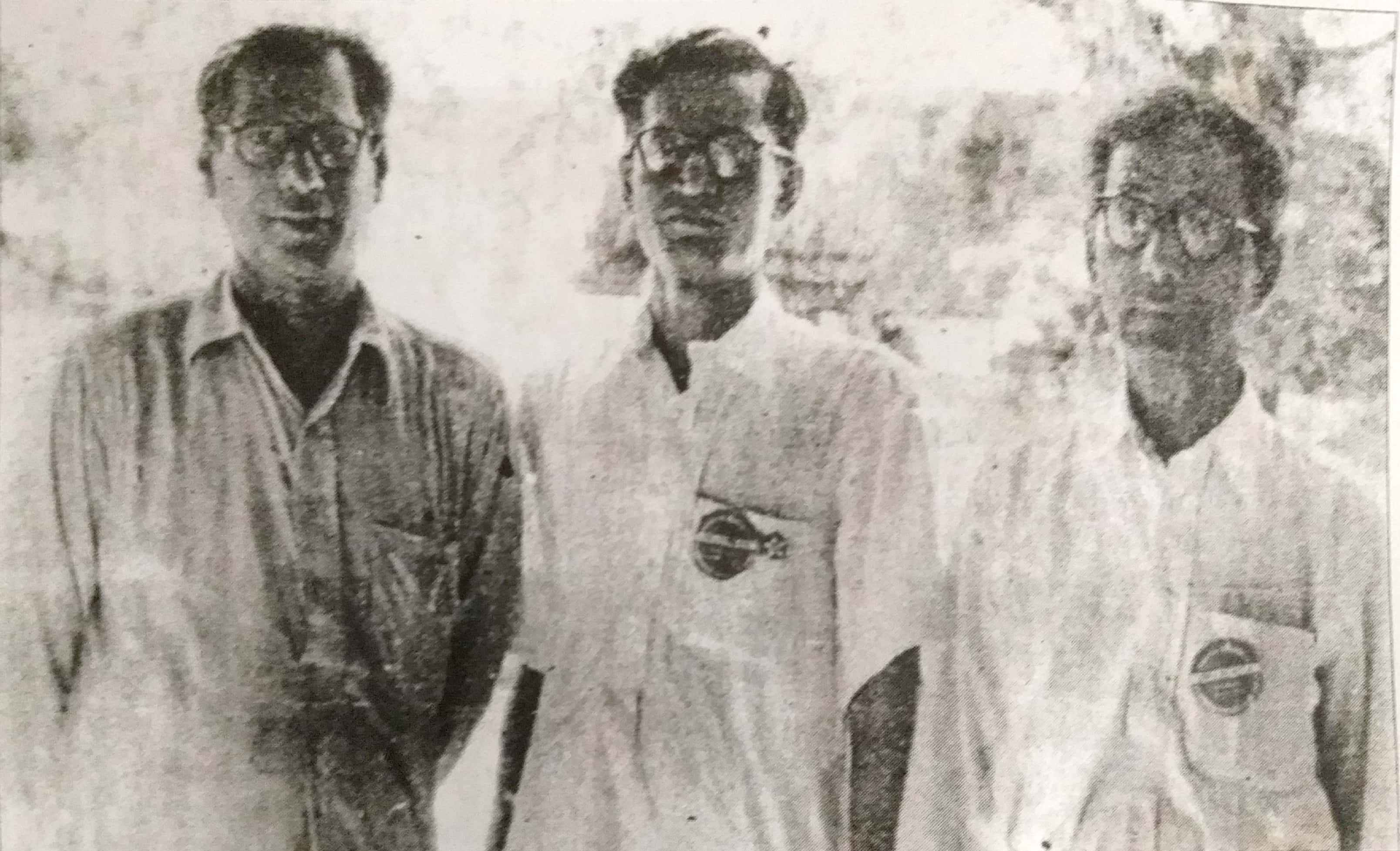
(From left to right) Abdul Halim, Saroj Mukherjee, and Muzaffar Ahmed at Bengal Provincial Conference (1938 December - 1939 January) of CPI at Chandarnagore

On 20 March 1929, the British colonial government arrested 31 labour activists and sent them to Meerut for trial. Ahmed was the chief accused, along with S.A. Dange, Shaukat Usmani, Puran Chand Joshi and others, and was convicted in this so-called Meerut Conspiracy case. He was released in 1936. He had served the longest term in jail as the chief accused in the Meerut trial.

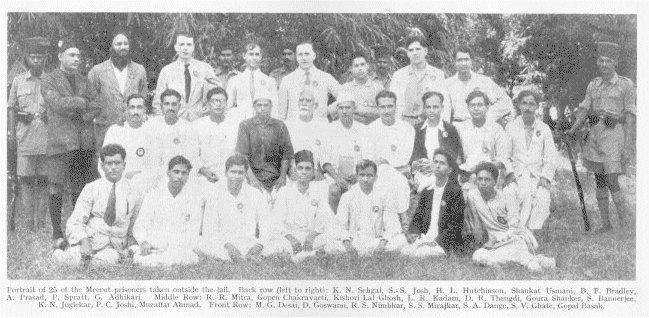
Portrait of 25 of the Meerut prisoners taken outside the jail. Back row (left to right): K. N. Sehgal, S. S. Josh, H. L. Hutchinson, Shaukat Usmani, B. F. Bradley, A. Prasad, P. Spratt, G. Adhikari. Middle row: R. R. Mitra, Gopen Chakravarti, Kishori Lal Ghosh, L. R. Kadam, D. R. Thengdi, Goura Shanker, S. Bannerjee, K. N. Joglekar, P. C. Joshi, Muzaffar Ahmad. Front row: M. G. Desai, D. Goswami, R. S. Nimbkar, S. S. Mirajkar, S. A. Dange, S. V. Ghate, Gopal Basak.

After the partition of India in 1947, Ahmed moved to Kolkata rather than staying in East Pakistan (now Bangladesh). On 25 March 1948, the Communist Party of India was banned by the Government of India, and Ahmed was imprisoned. He was released from prison in 1951. He was again arrested and incarcerated for two years in 1962 and for another two years in 1965. He was imprisoned several times in post-Independence India by the Congress government.

== Personal life ==
Ahmed had a daughter, Nargis. She was married to the poet Abdul Quadir.

== Legacy ==
- Co-founder of the Communist Party of India, 26 December 1925
- Founder of the National Book Agency, 26 June 1939
- The headquarters of the Communist Party of India (Marxist) in West Bengal is named after him.
- Ripon Street, a thoroughfare in Kolkata, was renamed "Muzaffar Ahmad Street".

== Selected works ==
- Qazi Nazrul Islam: Smritikatha (in Bengali)
- Amar Jiban O Bharater Communist Party (in Bengali)
- Krishak Samasya (in Bengali)
- Prabase Bharater Communist Party Gathan (in Bengali)
- Bharater Communist Party Gorar Pratham Jug (in Bengali)
- Nirbachita Prabandha (in Bengali)
