= Sarker =

Sarker is a surname. Notable people with the surname include:

- Jatin Sarker (1936–2025), Bangladeshi writer
- Malabika Sarker (born 1964), Bangladeshi physician and public health scientist
- Paul Sarker, Bangladeshi Protestant bishop
- Rebecca Sarker (born 1975), English actress
- Sunetra Sarker (born 1973), English actress

== See also ==
- Parker (surname)
