= Sircar =

Sircar is the surname of:

- Birendranath Sircar (1901–1980), Indian film producer and founder of New Theatres, Calcutta
- Dineshchandra Sircar (1907–1985), Indian epigraphist, historian, numismatist and folklorist
- Jawhar Sircar (born 1952), Indian civil servant and Member of Parliament (Rajya Sabha)
- Joydeep Sircar (born 1947), Indian mountaineer and mountaineering historian
- Muhammad Jamiruddin Sircar (1931–2026), former President of Bangladesh and Speaker of the Jatiya Sangsad (Bangladesh National Assembly)
- Nilratan Sircar (1861–1943), Indian doctor, educationist, philanthropist and Swadeshi entrepreneur
- Ranjabati Sircar (1963–1999), Indian dancer and choreographer
- Shoojit Sircar (born 1967), Indian film director and producer
- Sourindra Mohan Sircar (1908–1978), Indian botanist
- Tiya Sircar (born 1982), American actress

== See also ==
- Sarkar (disambiguation)
- Sorcar, a list of people from the same family
