= Nabajug =

- Logo of Nabajug
- Native name: নবযুগ
- Format: Daily newspaper
- Founder: A. K. Fazlul Huq
- Editor: Kazi Nazrul Islam; Muzaffar Ahmed
- Founded: 12 July 1920
- Language: Bengali
- Headquarters: Kolkata, British India
- Website: nabajug.news

Nabajug (Bengali: নবযুগ, meaning "New Age") was a Bengali-language daily newspaper established in Kolkata on 12 July 1920 by politician A. K. Fazlul Huq. Its first editors were poet Kazi Nazrul Islam and political activist Muzaffar Ahmed. According to Banglapedia, the newspaper was published until 1944.

The newspaper was part of the Bengali-language press during the colonial period, when newspapers and periodicals provided platforms for literary expression, political discussion and public debate.

== History ==
=== Establishment ===
Nabajug was founded in Kolkata on 12 July 1920 by A. K. Fazlul Huq, a prominent Bengali politician. Kazi Nazrul Islam and Muzaffar Ahmed served as its first editors.

The newspaper emerged during a period of political and cultural change in Bengal. Bengali-language publications played an important role in circulating ideas and facilitating public discussion under British colonial rule.

=== Editorial history ===
Kazi Nazrul Islam's association with Nabajug formed part of his wider literary and journalistic career. His work as a journalist is discussed in historical accounts of Bengali journalism and his literary activities.

Muzaffar Ahmed, who also served as an editor, was associated with political and intellectual movements in Bengal. Further details about the newspaper's editorial policies, contributors and circulation require additional historical documentation.

=== Coverage of women's employment ===
Nabajug opposed the appointment of Nirmalabala Shome to the education service when male applicants were available. This episode is discussed in Meredith Borthwick's book The Changing Role of Women in Bengal, 1849–1905.

=== End of publication ===
According to Banglapedia, Nabajug continued publication until 1944. Further research is needed to establish the circumstances surrounding its closure and whether any later publication continued under the same name.

== Legacy ==
Nabajug is associated with the early journalistic careers of Kazi Nazrul Islam and Muzaffar Ahmed and the public life of its founder, A. K. Fazlul Huq. Its history forms part of the development of Bengali-language journalism during the colonial period.

Modern accounts of Nazrul Islam's journalistic career provide additional context for understanding the relationship between journalism, literature and political expression in Bengal.

== See also ==
- Kazi Nazrul Islam
- A. K. Fazlul Huq
- Muzaffar Ahmed
- Bengali literature
- History of journalism in Bangladesh
