= Sarkaria =

Sarkaria may refer to:

- Ajeej Sarkaria (born 1995), Canadian soccer player
- Manprit Sarkaria (born 1996), Austrian footballer
- Prabmeet Sarkaria (born 1988), Canadian lawyer and politician
- Ranjit Singh Sarkaria (1916–2007), Indian Supreme Court justice
  - Sarkaria Commission, an Indian constitutional commission headed by Ranjit Singh Sarkaria
- Sukhbinder Singh Sarkaria, Indian politician in Punjab

== See also ==
- Sarkar (disambiguation)
