= Qırıqlı, Goygol =

Qırıqlı
- Municipality
- Location within Azerbaijan
- Coordinates: 40°39′N 46°16′E
- Country: Azerbaijan
- Rayon: Goygol

Population
  - Total: 2,133
- Time zone: UTC+4 (AZT)
  - Summer (DST): UTC+5 (AZT)

Qırıqlı (also, Qırıxlı, Kyrykhly, and Kyrykly) is a village and municipality in the Goygol Rayon of Azerbaijan. It has a population of 2,133. The municipality consists of the villages of Qırıqlı, Haçaqaya, and Sərkar.
