= Qarapirimli, Goranboy =

Qarapirimli
- Location within Azerbaijan
- Coordinates: 40°42′04″N 46°45′08″E
- Country: Azerbaijan
- Rayon: Goranboy
- Municipality: Qırıqlı
- Time zone: UTC+4 (AZT)
  - Summer (DST): UTC+5 (AZT)

Qarapirimli is a village in the Goranboy Rayon of Azerbaijan. The village forms part of the municipality of Qırıqlı.
