= West Bengal Legislative Council =

Legislative body in West Bengal (1957)

West Bengal Legislative Council পশ্চিমবঙ্গ বিধান পরিষদ

Type
- Type: Upper house of the West Bengal Legislature

History
- Founded: 1952
- Disbanded: 1 August 1969
- Preceded by: Bengal Legislative Council (British India)
- Succeeded by: West Bengal Legislative Assembly
- Seats: 51 (1952-57), 75(1957-69)

Elections
- Voting system: Indirect election
- Last election: 1967

Meeting place
- Legislative Council Chamber, Kolkata

The West Bengal Legislative Council was the upper house of the bicameral legislature in the Indian state of West Bengal, existing from 1952 to 1969. It was constituted under Article 168 of the Constitution of India to serve as a reviewing chamber for legislation passed by the West Bengal Legislative Assembly.

== List of Members of Legislative Council Members ==
=== Members of 1957 ===
No.	Member	Method of election
1	Abdul Halim, Janab	Elected by M.L.As.
2	Abdur Rashid, Janab Mirza	Elected by M.L.As.
3	Dr. Narendranath Bagchi	Elected by M.L.As.
4	Tarakdas Bandopadhyaya, Sj.	Nadia–Murshidabad (Local Authorities)
5	Sunil Kumar Banerjee, Sj.	Hooghly–Howrah (Local Authorities)
6	Tara Sankar Banerjee, Sj.	Nominated
7	Sankar Das Banerji, Sj.	Nominated
8	Gurugobinda Basu, Sj.	Nominated
9	Nagendra Kumar Bhattacharyya, Sj.	Nadia–Murshidabad (Local Authorities)
10	Nirmal Chandra Bhattacharyya, Sj.	Calcutta (Graduates)
11	Ram Kumar Bhuwalka, Sj.	Elected by M.L.As.
12	Dr. Monindra Mohan Chakrabarty	Elected by M.L.As.
13	Hridoy Bhusan Chakravarty, Sj.	Calcutta–24-Parganas (Local Authorities)
14	Devaprasad Chatterjee, Sj.	Calcutta–24-Parganas (Local Authorities)
15	Krishna Kumar Chatterjee, Sj.	Elected by M.L.As.
16	Dr. Sunit Kumar Chattopadhyay	West Bengal South (Graduates)
17	K. P. Chattopadhyay, Sj.	Elected by M.L.As.
18	Annada Prasad Choudhuri, Sj.	Burdwan Division North (Local Authorities)
19	Sikta Santi Das	Nominated
20	Narasingha Malla Ugal Sanda Deb, Sj.	Nominated
21	Sikta Anila Debi	Presidency Division North (Teachers)
22	Sikta Labanyaprova Dutt	Nominated
23	Kamini Kumar Ghose, Sj.	Calcutta (Teachers)
24	Ashutosh Ghosh, Sj.	Elected by M.L.As.
25	Dr. Pratap Chandra Guha Ray	Elected by M.L.As.
26	Manoranjan Gupta, Sj.	Elected by M.L.As.
27	Charu Chandra Mahanty, Sj.	Burdwan Division North (Local Authorities)
28	Sudhirendra Nath Majumdar, Sj.	Calcutta–24-Parganas (Local Authorities)
29	Sachindra Nath Misra, Sj.	West Bengal North (Local Authorities)
30	Mohammad Jan, Janab Shaikh	Nominated
31	Mohammad Sayeed Mia, Janab	Elected by M.L.As.
32	Kamala Charan Mookerjee, Sj.	Elected by M.L.As.
33	Kali Pada Mookerjee, Sj.	Calcutta–24-Parganas (Local Authorities)
34	Kamada Kinkar Mukherjee, Sj.	Elected by M.L.As.
35	Musharruf Hossain, Janab	Nominated
36	Bijoy Singh Nahar, Sj.	Elected by M.L.As.
37	R. S. Prasad, Sj.	Darjeeling (Local Authorities)
38	Lakshman Pradhan, Sj.	Elected by M.L.As.
39	Mohitosh Rai Choudhuri, Sj.	Elected by M.L.As.
40	Chittaranjan Roy, Sj.	
41	Satya Priya Roy, Sj.	Presidency Division South (Teachers)
42	Surendra Kumar Roy, Sj.	Elected by M.L.As.
43	Jogindralal Saha, Sj.	Calcutta–24-Parganas (Local Authorities)
44	Charu Chandra Sanyal, Sj.	West Bengal North (Graduates)
45	Pannalal Sarafogi, Sj.	Nominated
46	Pranabeswar Sarkar, Sj.	Burdwan Division North (Local Authorities)
47	Sarat Chandra Sawoo, Sj.	Calcutta–24-Parganas (Local Authorities)
48	Prafulla Chandra Sen, Sj.	Hooghly–Howrah (Local Authorities)
49	Manoranjan Sen Gupta, Sj.	Burdwan Division (Teachers)
50	Biman Behari Lal Singha, Sj.	Burdwan Division North (Local Authorities)
51	Rabindralal Sinha, Sj.	Hooghly–Howrah (Local Authorities)

=== Members of 1967 ===
No.	Member	Method of election
1	Abdul Bari Biswas	Murshidabad (Local Authorities)
2	Md. Abdullah Rasul	Elected by M.L.As.
3	Snehangshu Kanta Acharyya	Elected by M.L.As.
4	Nirmalya Bagchi	West Bengal South-West (Graduates)
5	Dr. Anil Chandra Banerjee	Nominated
6	Monmotho Nath Banerjee	24-Parganas (Local Authorities)
7	Nandalal Banerjee	Calcutta (Local Authorities)
8	Sudhir Kumar Banerjee	Elected by M.L.As.
9	Upendranath Barman	Elected by M.L.As.
10	Dhirendra Nath Bhattacharyya	Purulia (Local Authorities)
11	Dr. Janaki Ballabha Bhattacharyya	24-Parganas (Local Authorities)
12	Nirmal Chandra Bhattacharyya	Elected by M.L.As.
13	Santosh Kumar Bhattacharyya	West Bengal South-East (Teachers)
14	Promotho Nath Basu	Nominated
15	Nirmal Bose	Elected by M.L.As.
16	Naren Chakrabarty	Malda (Local Authorities)
17	Amar Prasad Chakrabarty	Elected by M.L.As.
18	Byomkesh Chakravarti	West Dinajpur (Local Authorities)
19	Rajkumar Chakraverty	24-Parganas (Teachers)
20	Jatin Chakravarty	Elected by M.L.As.
21	Ava Chatterjee	Elected by M.L.As.
22	Lalit Mohan Chatterjee	Howrah (Local Authorities)
23	Narendra Nath Das	Calcutta (Graduates)
24	Santi Das	Elected by M.L.As.
25	Anila Debi	Calcutta (Teachers)
26	Kumar Dutt	Calcutta (Local Authorities)
27	Sukumar Dutta	Elected by M.L.As.
28	Dr. Esmail Ebrahim	Elected by M.L.As.
29	Biswaratan Ganguly	Howrah (Local Authorities)
30	Bibhuti Bhusan Ghatak	Bankura (Local Authorities)
31	Kali Charan Ghose	Hooghly (Local Authorities)
32	Nanda Kishore Ghose	Calcutta (Graduates)
33	Pijush Chandra Ghosh	24-Parganas (Local Authorities)
34	Ashutosh Ghosh	Elected by M.L.As.
35	Dr. Rudranath Ghosh	Burdwan (Local Authorities)
36	Dr. Sarala Ghosh	Nominated
37	Dr. Pratap Chandra Guha Ray	Elected by M.L.As.
38	Manoranjan Gupta	Elected by M.L.As.
39	Nar Bahadur Gurung	Elected by M.L.As.
40	Gopal Haldar	Calcutta (Graduates)
41	Rebati Raman Manna	West Bengal South-East (Graduates)
42	Ramdas Ramanujdas Mohanta	Midnapore (Local Authorities)
43	Mohiuddin Ahmed Hazi	Nominated
44	Dhirendra Nath Moitra	Jalpaiguri (Local Authorities)
45	Dhajadhari Mondal	Elected by M.L.As.
46	Kedar Nath Mookerjee	Nominated
47	Bamandas Mukherjee	Burdwan (Local Authorities)
48	Biswanath Mukherjee	Elected by M.L.As. (Calcutta)
49	Biswanath Mukherjee	Elected by M.L.As. (Midnapore)
50	Sudhindra Nath Mukherjee	Hooghly (Local Authorities)
51	Debendra Kumar Mukhopadhyay	Birbhum (Local Authorities)
52	Barada Mukutmoni	Elected by M.L.As.
53	Amalendu Sekhar Naskar	24-Parganas (Local Authorities)
54	Sudhir Chandra Niyogi	Cooch Behar (Local Authorities)
55	Dr. Ras Behari Pal	Midnapore (Local Authorities)
56	Makhan Paul	Elected by M.L.As.
57	R. S. Prasad	Darjeeling (Local Authorities)
58	Rezaul Karim	Elected by M.L.As.
59	Dr. Biswaranjan Roy	Nadia (Local Authorities)
60	Chittaranjan Roy	Midnapore (Local Authorities)
61	Satya Priya Roy	Calcutta (Teachers)
62	Dr. Charu Chandra Sanyal	West Bengal North (Graduates)
63	Gobindalal Saraogi	Nominated
64	Dhanum Chand Sarawgi	Elected by M.L.As.
65	Reba Sen	Nominated
66	Subodh Sen	Elected by M.L.As.
67	Manoranjan Sen Gupta	West Bengal South-West (Teachers)
68	Rabindranath Sikdar	Elected by M.L.As.
69	Ram Lagan Singh	Elected by M.L.As.
70	Jatindra Singha	West Bengal North (Teachers)
71	Durgapada Sinha	Murshidabad (Local Authorities)
72	Rabindralal Sinha	Elected by M.L.As.
73	Amulya Chandra Sirkar	Calcutta (Local Authorities)

== History ==
=== Colonial predecessor ===
The Council had a predecessor in the Bengal Legislative Council during the British colonial period, which functioned under the Government of India Act, 1935.

=== Formation (1952) ===
Following independence, the Legislative Council was officially formed in 1952 to provide broader representation and a check on hasty legislation. Members were elected or nominated from various constituencies including local bodies, graduates, and teachers.

=== Abolition (1969) ===
On 21 March 1969, the West Bengal Legislative Assembly passed a resolution seeking the Council’s abolition under Article 169 of the Constitution. The Indian Parliament approved the request, and the Council was dissolved on 1 August 1969.

== Composition and structure ==
The Council was a permanent body not subject to dissolution, with one-third of its members retiring every two years. Its membership ranged from 40 to 78.

=== Categories of membership ===
- One-third elected by Legislative Assembly members
- One-third elected by local authorities
- One-twelfth elected by teachers
- One-twelfth elected by graduates
- Remainder nominated by the Governor of West Bengal

== Powers and limitations ==
The Council had limited legislative powers. It could:

- Recommend amendments to legislation
- Delay ordinary bills for up to four months
- Debate public matters in detail

It could not:

- Introduce or amend money bills
- Permanently block any legislation

== Chairmen of the Council ==
Name	Term	Notes
Habib-ur-Rehman Khan	1952–1958	First Chairman of the Council
Syed Nurul Hasan	1960–1964	Later Governor of West Bengal
Bibhuti Bhusan Das	1965–1969	Final presiding officer before abolition

== Architecture and premises ==
The Council chamber was located in the West Bengal Legislative Assembly complex in Kolkata. It featured a semi-circular design inspired by the Rajya Sabha. After the Council was dissolved, the chamber was used for other administrative purposes.

== Criticism and controversy ==
Critics viewed the Council as redundant and costly. It was often referred to as a "political rehabilitation chamber" for individuals who failed to win elections to the Assembly.

== Revival attempts ==
In July 2021, the West Bengal Legislative Assembly passed a resolution calling for the Council's revival. As of 2026, the Indian Parliament has not yet approved the proposal. The resolution lapsed on expiry of 17th West Bengal Assembly session.

== See also ==
- West Bengal Legislative Assembly
- Vidhan Parishad
- Bicameralism in India
- Rajya Sabha
- Politics of West Bengal
