= Haçaqaya =

- Location within Azerbaijan
- Coordinates: 40°39′28″N 46°13′33″E
- Country: Azerbaijan
- Rayon: TOVUZ
- Time zone: UTC+4 (AZT)
  - Summer (DST): UTC+5 (AZT)

Haçaqaya (also, Achakaya) is a village in the Tovuz Rayon of Azerbaijan. The village forms part of the municipality of TOVUZ .

== Notable natives ==
- Elshad Mammadov — National Hero of Azerbaijan.
