= Gülməmmədli, Goranboy =

Gülməmmədli
- Location within Azerbaijan
- Coordinates: 40°41′57″N 46°43′48″E
- Country: Azerbaijan
- Rayon: Goranboy
- Municipality: Qırıqlı
- Time zone: UTC+4 (AZT)
  - Summer (DST): UTC+5 (AZT)

Gülməmmədli (also, Gyul’mamedli and Gyulmamedly) is a village in the Goranboy Rayon of Azerbaijan. The village forms part of the municipality of Qırıqlı.
