= Malabika Sarker =

Bangladeshi physician and public health scientist

- Born: 14 July 1964 (age 62); Bangladesh
- Education: Chittagong Medical College; Heidelberg University; Harvard T.H. Chan School of Public Health; Karolinska Institute
- Children: 1 (Showvanik Das Gupta)
- Awards: Heroine of Health Global (2018); Women in Science in Bangladesh (2023)
- Scientific career
- Fields: Implementation science Mixed method
- Workplaces: BRAC University; Brown University; Heidelberg University
- Thesis: HIV related knowledge, Risk perception and Demand forecasting for VCT/PMTCT in women living in Rural Burkina Faso (2005)
- Website: www.bracu.ac.bd/about/people/malabika-sarker-phd

Malabika Sarker (born 14 July 1964) is a Bangladeshi physician and public health scientist. She is a Professor of Practice of Behavioral and Social Science at Brown School of Public Health, Brown University, USA. She is the former Associate Dean and Director of the Centre of Excellence for Science of Implementation and Scale-Up at the BRAC James P. Grant School of Public Health of BRAC University in Bangladesh.

== Early life and education ==
Malabika Sarker graduated from Chittagong Medical College. After completing her medical training, she joined the Marie Stopes Clinical Society. She moved to the Karolinska Institute in Sweden, where she completed a certificate in Gender and International Health. Sarker worked toward a master of public health at Harvard T.H. Chan School of Public Health. After securing her master's degree, Sarker returned to Europe, where she completed her doctoral research at Heidelberg University. Her doctorate research explored women in Burkina Faso's awareness of HIV.

== Research and career ==
Before joining Brown School of Public Health, Prof. Sarker was the Associate Dean & Professor of BRAC James P Grant School of Public Health (BRAC JPGSPH), BRAC University. She founded the Institute review board (IRB) and the Center of Excellence of Science of Implementation & Scale-Up (SISU) at BRAC JPGSPH, Bangladesh. She also served as the Acting Dean in 2015 and as Research Advisor for BRAC University from 2019-2021. She is currently adjunct faculty at BRAC James P Grant School of Public Health. She teaches Quantitative Research Methods, Implementation Research, Monitoring, and Evaluation at BRAC JPGSPH. She is also the coordinator and lecturer of the course on Mixed Methods in International Health Research at Heidelberg Institute of Public Health, Heidelberg University, Germany.

Malabika started her career as a community-based reproductive health programmer at the Marie Stopes Clinic Society, an international organization in Bangladesh. Later she joined BRAC, Bangladesh, the largest Non-Government Organization in the world, and worked as a community-based physician in Dinajpur, a rural northern district in Bangladesh.

Her research considers implementation research and systematic strategies to reform public health programs. She pioneered novel community-based approaches to health care, including developing educational campaigns that seek to change understanding about child marriage. She launched campaigns to improve women's health, including a maternity waiting area for at-risk pregnant women from rural villages, and advocating for women public health scientists. She was made Principal Investigator for Bangladesh in the Johns Hopkins University STRIPE program (Synthesis and Translation of Research and Innovation from Polio Eradication), a global health initiative that seeks to eradicate polio.

== Selected publications ==
- Ophira Ginsburg; Frank Bray; Michel P. Coleman; et al. (1 November 2016). "The global burden of women's cancers: a grand challenge in global health". The Lancet. 389 (10071): 847–860. doi:10.1016/s0140-6736(16)31392-7. ISSN 0140-6736. PMC 6191029. PMID 27814965. Wikidata Q30241791.
- Manuela De Allegri; Valéry Ridde; Valérie R Louis; Malabika Sarker; Justin Tiendrebéogo; Maurice Yé; Olaf Müller; Albrecht Jahn (5 November 2010). "Determinants of utilisation of maternal care services after the reduction of user fees: a case study from rural Burkina Faso". Health Policy. 99 (3): 210–218. doi:10.1016/j.healthpol.2010.10.010. ISSN 0168-8510. PMID 21056505. Wikidata Q43930612.
- Mohammad Didar Hossain; Helal Uddin Ahmed; M M Jalal Uddin; et al. (1 August 2017). "Autism Spectrum disorders (ASD) in South Asia: a systematic review". BMC Psychiatry. 17 (1): 281. doi:10.1186/s12888-017-1440-x. ISSN 1471-244X. PMC 5563911. PMID 28826398. Wikidata Q41466795.
