= Qırıqlı, Goranboy =

Qırıqlı
- Municipality
- Location within Azerbaijan
- Coordinates: 40°42′35″N 46°45′23″E
- Country: Azerbaijan
- Rayon: Goranboy

Population
  - Total: 932
- Time zone: UTC+4 (AZT)
  - Summer (DST): UTC+5 (AZT)

Qırıqlı (also, Qırıxlı, Kyrykhly, and Kyrykly) is a village and municipality in the Goranboy Rayon of Azerbaijan. It has a population of 932. The municipality consists of the villages of Qırıqlı, Qarapirimli, and Gülməmmədli.
