= Sərkar, Samukh =

Sərkar
- Municipality
- Location within Azerbaijan
- Coordinates: 40°45′44″N 46°22′17″E
- Country: Azerbaijan
- Rayon: Samukh

Population
  - Total: 4,850
- Time zone: UTC+4 (AZT)
  - Summer (DST): UTC+5 (AZT)

Sərkar (also, Sarkyar) is a village and municipality in the Samukh Rayon of Azerbaijan. It has a population of 4,850.
