= Gülməmmədli, Jalilabad =

Gülməmmədli
- Municipality
- Location within Azerbaijan
- Coordinates: 39°19′28″N 48°21′43″E
- Country: Azerbaijan
- Rayon: Jalilabad

Population
  - Total: 2,442
- Time zone: UTC+4 (AZT)
  - Summer (DST): UTC+5 (AZT)

Gülməmmədli (also, Gul’mamedly, Gyul’mamedli, and Gyul’mamedly) is a village and municipality in the Jalilabad Rayon of Azerbaijan. It has a population of 2,442.
