= Qarapirimli, Agdam =

Qarapirimli
- Location within Azerbaijan Location within Karabakh Economic Region
- Coordinates: 40°09′29″N 46°51′50″E
- Country: Azerbaijan
- Rayon: Agdam
- Time zone: UTC+4 (AZT)
  - Summer (DST): UTC+5 (AZT)

Qarapirimli (Armenian: Ղարափիրիմլի, also Karapirimli, Ghara'pirimli, and Karapirum) is a village in the Agdam Rayon of Azerbaijan.
