= Sərkar, Goygol =

Village in Goygol, Azerbaijan

Coordinates: 40.6447°N 46.2477°E

Sərkar (also, Sərkarh) is a village in the municipality of Qırıqlı in the Goygol Rayon of Azerbaijan.
