= Sisir Kumar Sarkar =

Indian Bengali scientist (born 1953)

- শিশির কুমার সরকার
- Born: 25 April 1953 (age 73); Kolkata, India
- Education: Presidency University (B.Sc); University of Mumbai (Ph.D); Columbia University
- Occupation: Scientist
- Relatives: Sreyash Sarkar (nephew)
- Scientific career
- Fields: Radiochemistry; Nuclear chemistry; Photochemistry; Physical chemistry; Laser; Raman Spectroscopy
- Workplaces: Bhabha Atomic Research Center; Homi Bhabha National Institute; Savitribai Phule Pune University
- Doctoral advisor: J. W Flynn

Sisir Kumar Sarkar (Bengali: শিশির কুমার সরকার; born 25 April 1953) is an Indian Bengali scientist associated with the Bhabha Atomic Research Center. He is best known for his contributions to photo-physics and photochemistry in nuclear fuel cycle and chemical dynamics.

== Biography ==
Sarkar was born on April 25, 1953, in Medinipur, West Bengal, India. He obtained his Bachelor of Science from Presidency University and Master of Science from University of Calcutta respectively. He received his Doctor of Philosophy degree from the University of Mumbai and subsequently a postdoctoral fellowship from Columbia University in 1973. His postdoctoral work was with Prof. J.W Flynn in the area of chemical dynamics using high-resolution semiconductor diode lasers. His siblings include the noted physicist professor of University of Calcutta, Prof. Samir K Sarkar, the noted solid-state physicist of Presidency University, Prof. Salil K. Sarkar and his nephew is the internationally published poet and microelectronics engineer, Sreyash Sarkar.

Sarkar joined the Multidisciplinary Research Scheme (MDRS) of Bhabha Atomic Research Center, Mumbai in 1974 and started working as an A-grade scientist and in 2000 started heading the Radiation & Photochemistry Division. He has been heading several high-end projects of BARC such as the Laser Isotope Separation programme of the Department of Atomic Energy at its very onset. He was president of the Society of Materials Chemistry of BARC from 2013 to 2014. Sarkar has also been the Vice President of ISRAPS (Indian Society for Radiation and Photochemical Sciences) and Indian Laser Association (ILA) from 2009 to 2012 and has been inducted as an executive member into the Maharashtra Academy of Sciences since 2005. Sarkar was one of the founding members of Indian Association of Nuclear Chemists and Allied Scientists(IANCAS).

He has worked extensively as visiting scientists at the P.N.Lebedev Physical Institute & Institute of Spectroscopy, Russia, Kyoto Institute of Technology, Japan, Institute of Chemical Process Fundamentals, Czech Republic, Paris-Sud University, France and the Heidelberg University, Germany with various laser systems including Free Electron Lasers.

Sarkar currently serves as a senior professor at Homi Bhabha National Institute.

== Research ==
Sarkar's research interests focused on radiation & photochemistry with lasers and accelerators, chemical dynamics, spectroscopy and laser development. He is the author or co-author of more than 350 journal articles, as well as 16 books and, 32 book chapters.

During his tenure as head of the Radiation & Photochemistry Division at BARC, he launched the Molecular Laser Isotope Separation (MLIS) programme with the aid of Department of Atomic Energy in close collaboration with the International Nuclear Information System(INIS). The idea was to use the intense, monochromatic light of lasers to break the chemical bonds of only those molecules containing the fissionable isotope uranium-235. At present the programme is evolving around the separation of low and middle mass isotopes, namely sulphur 34/33/32, oxygen 17/18, carbon 13/12, hydrogen T/D/H to be followed by an advanced engineering programme designed to lead to a demonstration plant. The latest results have come very close to the design parameters specified for a full-scale separation of carbon isotopes.

His research spans from understanding quantum state-resolved study in molecular chemistry to the operation of optically pumped molecular lasers to its varied applications in photochemistry and also the isotope selective IR multiphoton dissociation in laser waveguide reactors. His work in radiochemistry addresses the radical chemistry of glucosamine naphthalene acetic acid and naphthalene acetic acids. His extensive work on Raman Spectroscopy addresses the process of how ions affect the structure of water.

In 2010, Sarkar was chosen as the Savitribai Phule Pune University Distinguished Lecturer in Photochemistry.

== Selected publications ==
Journal articles

- Choudhury, Sharmistha Dutta; Kumbhakar, Manoj; Nath, Sukhendu; Sarkar, Sisir Kumar; Mukherjee, Tulsi; Pal, Haridas (November 2007). "Compartmentalization of Reactants in Different Regions of Sodium 1,4-Bis(2-ethylhexyl)sulfosuccinate/Heptane/Water Reverse Micelles and Its Influence on Bimolecular Electron-Transfer Kinetics". Journal of Physical Chemistry B. 14 (6): 8842–8853. doi:10.1021/jp0722004. PMID 17608520.
- Shibin, Naduvilpurakkal B.; Sreekanth, Radhakrishnan; Aravind, Usha K.; Afsal Mohammed, Kadavilpparampu M.; Chandrashekhar, Narayana V.; Joseph, Jayan; Sarkar, Sisir K.; Naik, Devidas B.; Aravindakumar, Charuvila T. (June 2014). "Radical chemistry of glucosamine naphthalene acetic acid and naphthalene acetic acid: a pulse radiolysis study". Journal of Physical Organic Chemistry . 27 (6): 478–483. doi:10.1002/poc.3285.
- Ahmed, Mohammed; Namboodiri, V.; Singh, Ajay K.; Mondal, Jahur A.; Sarkar, Sisir K. (December 2013). "How ions affect the structure of water: a combined Raman spectroscopy and multivariate curve resolution study". The Journal of Physical Chemistry B. 117 (51): 16479–16485. doi:10.1021/jp4100697. PMID 24298945.
- Guleria, Apurav; Singh, Ajay K.; Adhikari, Soumyakanti; Sarkar, Sisir K. (September 2013). "Radiation induced physicochemical changes in FAP (fluoro alkyl phosphate) based imidazolium ionic liquids and their mechanistic pathways: influence of hydroxyl group functionalization of the cation". Dalton Transactions. 43 (2): 609–625. doi:10.1039/C3DT51265G. PMID 24132212.
- Guleria, Apurav; Singh, Ajay K.; Rath, Madhab C.; Adhikari, Soumyakanti; Sarkar, Sisir K. (August 2013). "Islands of CdSe nanoparticles within Se nanofibers: a room temperature ionic liquid templated synthesis". Dalton Transactions. 42 (42): 15159–15168. doi:10.1039/C3DT51540K. PMID 24005564.
- Ahmed, Mohammed; Singh, Ajay K.; Mondal, Jahur A.; Sarkar, Sisir K. (July 2013). "Water in the Hydration Shell of Halide Ions Has Significantly Reduced Fermi Resonance and Moderately Enhanced Raman Cross Section in the OH Stretch Regions". Journal of Physical Chemistry B. 117 (33): 9728–9733. doi:10.1021/jp403618x. PMID 23895453.
- Biswal, Jayashree; Paul, Jhimli; Naik, D.B.; Sarkar, S.K.; Sabharwal, S. (April 2013). "Radiolytic degradation of 4-nitrophenol in aqueous solutions: Pulse and steady state radiolysis study". Radiation Physics and Chemistry. 85 (33): 161–166. Bibcode:2013RaPC...85..161B. doi:10.1016/j.radphyschem.2013.01.003.
- Singh, S.; Guleria, A.; Singh, A.K.; Rath, M.C.; Adhikari, S.; Sarkar, S.K. (May 2013). "Radiolytic synthesis and spectroscopic investigations of Cadmium Selenide quantum dots grown in cationic surfactant based quaternary water-in-oil microemulsions". Journal of Colloid and Interface Science. 398 (33): 112–119. Bibcode:2013JCIS..398..112S. doi:10.1016/j.jcis.2013.02.008. PMID 23489608.
- Upadhyay, J.; Sharma, M. L.; Navathe, C. P.; Toley, M. A.; Shinde, S. J.; Nadkarni, S. A.; Sarkar, S. K. (February 2012). "Development of high-voltage pulse-slicer unit with variable pulse duration for pulse radiolysis system". Review of Scientific Instruments. 83 (2): 112–119. Bibcode:2012RScI...83b4709U. doi:10.1063/1.3685245. PMID 22380115.
- Singh, Shalini; Rath, M. C.; Sarkar, S. K. (October 2011). "Investigation of Dynamics of Radiolytic Formation of CdSe Nanoparticles in Aqueous Solutions". Journal of Physical Chemistry A. 115 (46): 13251–13258. Bibcode:2011JPCA..11513251S. doi:10.1021/jp206028x. PMID 21995645.

Books

- Laser Selective Chemistry. 1999.
