= Abdur Rezzak Khan =

Indian politician

- আবদুর রেজ্জাক খান
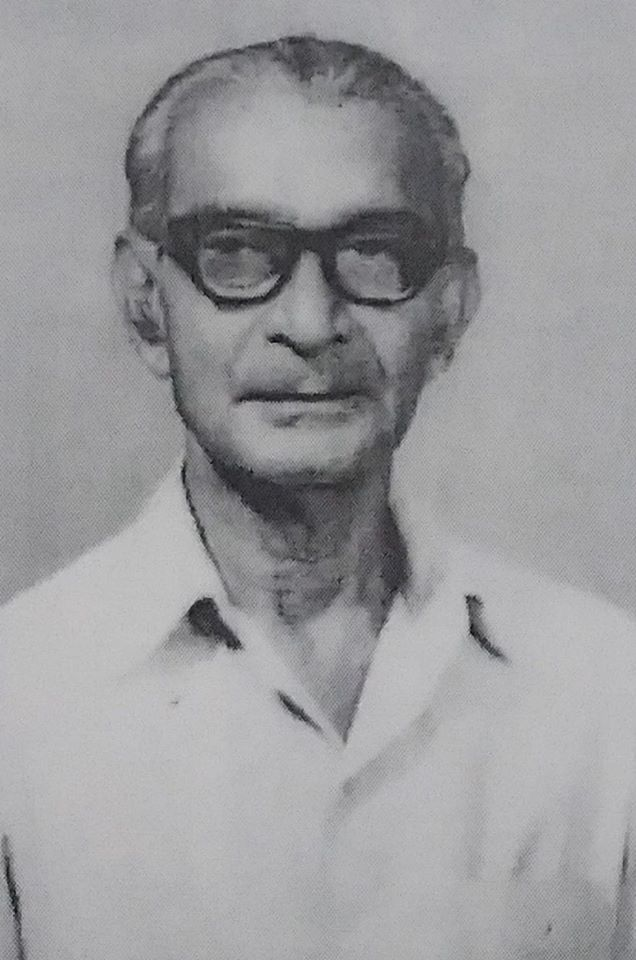

Member of the West Bengal Legislative Assembly
- In office 1969–1971
- Preceded by: H. N. Mazumdar
- Succeeded by: Molla Tasmatulla
- Constituency: Hasnabad

Personal details
- Born: June 1900 Hakimpur, 24 parganas, Bengal Presidency, British India
- Died: 28 January 1984 (aged 83)
- Party: Communist Party of India; Communist Party of India (Marxist)

Abdur Rezzak Khan (June 1900 – 28 January 1984) Bengali anti-British freedom fighter, communist revolutionary and politician. He was a member of the West Bengal Legislative Assembly in 1969.

== Background ==
He was born in June 1900 at Hakimpur, 24 parganas of Bengal Presidency, British India.

== Political movement ==
During the Chittagong armoury raid led by Masterda Surya Sen, he secretly supplied arms. Santosh Kumar Mitra, a revolutionary martyr, was one of his companions. In 1922, he came in contact with Muzaffar Ahmed and Abdul Halim. He was one of the founding member of the Workers and Peasants Party. He led a first time large-scale general strike of jute workers with Abdul Momin and others in 1929.
