= Hemanta Kumar Sarkar =

Indian writer and activist (1897–1952)

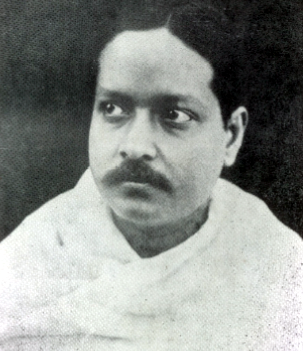
- Hemanta Kumar Sarkar as the Home Minister of Dewas State in 1927.
- Born: 1897; Baganchra, Nadiya district, Bengal Presidency, British India
- Died: 3 November 1952 (aged 54–55); Krishnanagar, West Bengal, India
- Occupation: Peasant leader

Hemanta Kumar Sarkar (1897 – 3 November 1952) was an Indian philologist, author, biographer, editor, publisher, union leader, leader of the Indian freedom movement and an associate of Subhas Chandra Bose. He was a close friend and the first biographer of Subhas Chandra Bose, the co-founder of Labour Swaraj Party in Bengal along with Muzaffar Ahmed and Kazi Nazrul Islam and led the movement for the Partition of Bengal and formation of Bengali Hindu homeland in 1947.

== Early life ==
Sarkar was born in 1897 in the village of Baganchra near Shantipur in the district of Nadia, the fifth of six sons to Madan Mohan Sarkar and Kadambari Devi. His father was the owner of a banking business started by his great-grandfather and his mother was the granddaughter of Raghunandan Mitra, the Dewan of the Nadia Raj. In his childhood, Sarkar attended the Krishnagar Collegiate School. In 1912, Sarkar came under the influence of Beni Madhab Das who had arrived as the new headmaster of the school from Ravenshaw Collegiate School in Cuttack. Das introduced him to his former pupil Subhas Chandra Bose, which culminated in a lifelong friendship between Sarkar and Bose. In May 1913, Bose came to Krishnanagar and stayed with Sarkar during the summer recess. In 1914, Sarkar and Bose ran away from home in search of a spiritual guru and travelled to Ayodhya, Haridwar, Mathura, Vrindavan and Varanasi. At Vrindavan, Baba Ramakrishnadas advised them to give up looking for a guru because they were argumentative and spiritual life was not suitable for them. They returned home after three months. Inspired by the worker's education programmes in Manchester and Birmingham, he along with Sailen Ghosh started the Krishnanagar Workmen's Institute, a night school that offered free education to the working-class people. In 1917, Sarkar earned his BA with First Class Honours in Sanskrit from the Krishnagar Government College. He was awarded the Mohini Mohan Roy Prize for standing first among all the BA and BSc students in his college. After his graduation, Sarkar took admission in the University of Calcutta in a masters programme in Comparative Philology. In 1919, he stood first in the MA in Comparative Philology and received the university gold medal.

== Career ==
In 1919, Sarkar was appointed lecturer in Comparative Philology at the University of Calcutta by Ashutosh Mukherjee, then President of the Graduate Council of the university. He taught Vedic Sanskrit, Modern Bengali Poetry and Philology of the Indian Vernaculars. In 1920, his thesis titled "The Intellectual Laws of Language" was accepted by the Premchand Roychand Scholarship. In the same year, he was also awarded a Government of India Scholarship to study in England for three years. Subhas Chandra Bose, who had already arrived in England a few months back, started making arrangements for Sarkar's admission and lodging at his own college, Fitzwilliam Hall in the University of Cambridge, so that they could be together once again.

At the call of Chittranjan Das, Sarkar declined the scholarship to study in England and gave up his lectureship at the University of Calcutta to join the freedom movement, a decision which he rued later. In 1920, Sarkar started his political career as the private secretary of Das. During this time, he stayed at the Das family residence. He attended the 1920 Congress session at Nagpur, the 1921 Congress session at Ahmedabad and the 1922 Congress session at Gaya as a delegate. In 1921, he was instrumental in organising strikes at the Raniganj Paper Mills and the Bengal Nagpur Railway. He also organised the Press Employees Association strike, one of the largest and longest strikes in British India where around 10,000 employees struck work for two and a half months. Das also entrusted him with the responsibility of editing and managing the weekly nationalist paper Banglar Katha. When Bose returned to India, Sarkar introduced him to Das. On 7 December 1921, Sarkar was arrested by the British colonial police and sentenced to six months' rigorous imprisonment under the Criminal Law Amendment Act for selling Khadi on College Street in Kolkata. At his trial, Sarkar told the judge, "As I consider myself to be a free Indian, I deny the jurisdiction of this court set up by the British falsely in the name of law and order. I hope to be released only when the prison gate is opened by the first President of the free Indian Republic." He was imprisoned at the Alipore Central Jail where he shared his cell with Chiraranjan Das, the son of Chittaranjan Das. Later he was shifted to a larger cell which he shared with Chittaranjan Das, Birendranath Sasmal and Subhas Chandra Bose. In prison, Sarkar suffered from smallpox when he was nursed back to health by Bose. Recounting the prison days, Sarkar later wrote that the middle-class Indians, who went to jail for the first time, overcame the fear of torture in the jails, thus strengthening the Indian independence movement.

Sarkar was released from prison in June 1922. He returned to Nadia and carried on with public work. When Swarajya Party was founded in December 1922, Sarkar became a member of the party. In 1923, Sarkar got elected in the Bengal Legislative Council from Nadia on a Swarajya Party ticket. At 25, he became the youngest member of the council. Later he became the chief whip of Swarajya Party in the council. According to H. E. A. Cotton, the President of the council, Sarkar was one of the most intellectually gifted members. Sarkar's speech during the Budget debate of 1924 was greeted as 'the speech of the season' by The Statesman.

Later he left the Congress over differences with the leadership and engaged himself in workers movement. Sarkar began to fight for the rights of the peasants and the workers and came to be known as the leader of the proletariat. On 1 November 1925, he along with Muzaffar Ahmed, Kazi Nazrul Islam, Qutubuddin Ahmad and Shamsuddin Hussain founded the Labour Swaraj Party in Bengal. At the All Bengal Praja Conference held in Krishnanagar on 6 February 1926, the name of the party was changed to Peasants and Workers Party of Bengal and Sarkar became the joint secretary along with Qutubuddin Ahmad. In 1926, he contested the General Elections to the Indian Legislative Assembly from Presidency Division. Between 1927 and 1929, Sarkar organised three tenants conference in Kushtia. In 1927, the All Bengal Praja Conference was held at Kushtia in Nadia district presided over by Sarkar himself. Soumendranath Tagore and Philip Spratt spoke at the conference. In July 1927, Sarkar took up the post of Home Minister to His Highness the Raja of Dewas, Malhar Rao Powar. In 1928, the regional tenants conference was held at the Jatindra Mohan Hall in Kushtia presided over by Muzaffar Ahmed. Hemanta Kumar Sarkar and Philip Spratt spoke at the conference. The same year Sarkar had to resign from his post as the Home Minister of Dewas State because of British pressure on the Raja to appoint a pro-British minister. Subsequently, Sarkar returned to Bengal and settled in Kushtia in Nadia from where he used to edit and publish the Bengali weekly Jagaran. In March 1929, the regional tenants conference was presided over by Sarkar himself where Philip Spratt, Muzaffar Ahmed, Abdul Halim and others spoke. In 1929, Sarkar's Kushtia house and the Jagaran printing press were raided by the British colonial police, as part of investigations into the Meerut Conspiracy Case. Sarkar was forced to leave Kushtia and he moved to Kolkata. The paper Jagaran and the press were moved to Kolkata but Jagaran was closed by the British authority and Sarkar had to sell the printing press.

In 1934, he contested in the Central Legislative Council on a Congress ticket and lost. After the defeat, he stayed away from politics for some time. From 1935 to 1940, Sarkar tried his hand at a few roles in the business world, with companies such as the New India Assurance Co., New Asia Life Insurance Co., but he was not successful. He became the managing director of the New India Steam Navigation Co. and started a passenger and cargo line between Kolkata and Yangon. But after a few years, this company went into liquidation.

In 1940, when the district ad hoc committees were being constituted, he became the member of the ad hoc committee. He joined Mohandas Gandhi in the Satyagraha movement and was sent to jail for one year for a personal satyagraha on behalf of the fishermen of Nadia. He was released in 1941 on grounds of poor health due to illness.

In late 1946, Sarkar formed the Bengal Partition League along with Syama Prasad Mookerjee, Nalinaksha Sanyal, Colonel A.C. Chatterjee and others to press for the partition of Bengal and formation of a separate province for the Bengali Hindu people. He wrote a series of articles in Dainik Basumati justifying the need for the partition. He founded a Bengali daily named Paschimbanga Patrika in support of West Bengal.

== Later life ==
Sarkar spent his last years in Krishnanagar, working with local fishermen to improve their living conditions. He died on 3 November 1952. Even in his last writings, he continued to propose that the news of Bose's death in an air crash was wrong, and that he would return to India soon.

== Personal life ==
In November 1926, Sarkar married Sudhira Tagore (1902–1973), one of the first women post-graduates of Bengal. In 1931, Sarkar and his wife built their home at 7 Ballygunge Place in Kolkata. Sarkar had three sons – Manabendra, Dipankar and Manasija.

== Books ==
Sarkar had written books in Bengali and English on linguistics and the personal experiences of his political career. In 1927, he published the first biographical sketch of Subhas Chandra Bose.

=== Bengali ===
- নদীয়া ও কলিকাতার কতকগুলি চলিত কথা

=== English ===
- History of the Bengali Language
- The Intellectual Laws of Language
- Twelve Years With Subhas
- My Jail Experiences
- Reminiscences of Deshbandhu
