= Sorcar =

Sorcar is the surname of:

- P. C. Sorcar (1913-1971), Indian stage magician
  - Manick Sorcar, Indian-American artist, animator and engineer, eldest son of P. C. Sorcar
    - Piya Sorcar (born 1977), Indian-American social entrepreneur and researcher, eldest daughter of Manick Sorcar
  - P. C. Sorcar, Jr. (born 1946), Indian magician, son of P. C. Sorcar
    - Maneka Sorcar, magician, daughter of P. C. Sorcar, Jr.
    - Moubani Sorcar, Indian actress and painter, daughter of P. C. Sorcar, Jr.
    - Mumtaz Sorcar, Indian film actress, daughter of P. C. Sorcar, Jr.
  - P.C. Sorcar, Young (born 1950), Indian magician, son of P. C. Sorcar

== See also ==
- Sarkar (disambiguation)
