= Relationship between education and HIV/AIDS =

Young people with knowledge on hiv prevention

Education is recognized as a social determinant of health. Education has also been identified as a social vaccine against contracting HIV. Research suggests a negative linear relationship between educational attainment (years of education) and HIV infection rate, especially the educational attainment of women and girls.

The United Nations Educational, Scientific, and Cultural Organization (UNESCO) aims to ensure all individuals, in and out of formal education, have access to comprehensive HIV education. UNESCO is a founding cosponsor of UNAIDS, and in conjunction with partner agencies UNESCO published the International Technical Guidance on Sexuality Education in 2018. This report provides evidence-based guidelines for developing and implementing comprehensive sex education curriculum for young people.

== Availability of HIV/AIDS information ==
Education is a strong factor in improving population health by building in individuals the capacity to process and understand risks related to the HIV/AIDS pandemic. Inadequate information becomes a risk factor for the spread of sexually transmitted diseases (STDs). The mischaracterization of HIV/AIDS as a homosexual disease has led higher status heterosexuals that participate in risky sexual behavior to continue without considering the risk of infection.

Data analysis collected in Sydney, Australia in 2007 found that within 236 adults, age 20 to 65, respondents were concerned about risks of HIV/AIDS transmitted through casual contact, leading to disapproval of homosexuality and drug use. In contrast, highly educated respondents were shown to be less likely to overestimate the possibility of HIV transmission through casual contact compared to respondents with a lower level education.

In a 2011 study, 1 in 4 students aged 16 and above in England stated they had learned nothing about HIV/AIDS in school, even though learning about sexually transmitted diseases is compulsory for secondary school students in England and Wales.

== Attitudinal changes and education ==
=== Stigma ===
Stigma associated with those who have HIV/AIDS in Sub-Saharan Africa prevents many from getting tested. As formal education continues to change attitudes towards those living with HIV/AIDS, the reduction of stigma enhances prevention techniques.

A 2016 study in primarily African-American faith-based organizations in South Carolina, United States found that education level was associated with lower levels of stigmatizing attitudes about HIV/AIDS.

=== Self-efficacy ===
A 2020 systematic review showed that financial education increased self-efficacy and lowered vulnerability to HIV in young people in low and middle income countries. In many of the studies in the review, financial education was combined with sexual health education and/or counselling.

== Impact on infection rate and other outcomes ==
=== Infection rate ===
In the late 1980s and early 1990s, the introduction of partially accurate information in Sub-Saharan Africa led to a decline in HIV rates among more educated, suggesting they may have the greater cognitive skill required to sift through the various levels of accuracy and mount a more effective response. Increased motivation needed to analyze personal risks and behavioural choices were increased by cognitive abilities enhanced by formal education, suggesting a direct correlation.

A 2018 analysis of data from over 500,000 people in Sub-Saharan Africa showed that secondary school completion for women was correlated with a lower likelihood of being HIV positive. However, primary school completion alone, without subsequent secondary school completion, is associated with a higher risk of being HIV positive than not completing primary school.

A 2018 review of studies conducted in Sub-Saharan Africa found evidence that support for girls' and young women's schooling is associated with lower rates of HIV infection. Types of support include cash transfers to families, educational support (such as school fees paid on student's behalf), savings accounts and microcredit, and vocational training.

=== HIV test uptake ===
In Zambia, a 2018 study of over 15,000 women of childbearing age found a strong correlation between educational attainment and uptake of HIV/AIDS testing. Similar findings were reported in a 2020 study of 2660 women in Ghana.

=== Medication efficacy and mortality ===
A study of nearly 25,000 European patients who started combined antiretroviral treatment (cART) between 1996 and 2013 found that patients with fewer years of education had poorer responses to cART and lower survival.

== Critique ==
Studies of the effectiveness of HIV education programs often rely on self-reported information about knowledge and behavior, leading to a possible social desirability bias if subjects report what they think the interviewer wants to think. Encouraging Kenyan students to write essays on way of protecting oneself against HIV/AIDS led to increased self-reported use of condoms without an increase in self-reported sexual activity. There is no evidence to determine whether an increase in condom use by students corresponds to actual reduction in HIV/AIDS.

Early research in Sub-Saharan Africa identified formal education as a risk factor, with more educated individuals being most likely to be infected. Some studies have found that educational attainment decreases girls' and women's vulnerability to HIV/AIDS, but does not affect or even worsens boys' and men's risk.

== See also ==
- Prevention of HIV/AIDS
- Sex education
- Discrimination against people with HIV/AIDS
- Economic impact of HIV/AIDS
- AIDS education and training centers
- Abstinence, be faithful, use a condom
- TeachAids
