= Economic impact of HIV/AIDS =

Changes in life expectancy in some hard-hit African countries between 1960 and 2012. Botswana Zimbabwe Kenya South Africa Uganda

HIV/AIDS affects economic growth by reducing the availability of human capital. Without proper prevention, nutrition, health care and medicine that is available in developing countries, large numbers of people are developing AIDS.

People living with HIV/AIDS will not only be unable to work, but will also require significant medical care. The forecast is that this will probably cause a collapse of babies and societies in countries with a significant AIDS population. In some heavily infected areas, the epidemic has left behind many orphans, who are cared for by elderly grandparents.

The increased mortality in this region will result in a smaller skilled population and labor force. This smaller labor force will be predominantly young people, with reduced knowledge and work experience leading to reduced productivity. An increase in workers' time off to look after sick family members or for sick leave will also lower productivity. Increased mortality will also weaken the mechanisms that generate human capital and investment in people, through loss of income and the death of parents. As the epidemic progresses, the age profile of those infected will increase, though the peak is expected to stay within the working age population. HIV disproportionately infects and impacts on women, so those sectors employing large numbers of women e.g. education, may be disproportionately economically impacted by HIV

== Effect on taxable population ==
By killing off mainly young adults, AIDS seriously weakens the taxable population, reducing the resources available for public expenditures such as education and health services not related to AIDS resulting in increasing pressure for the state's finances and slower growth of the economy. This results in a slower growth of the tax base, an effect that will be reinforced if there are growing expenditures on treating the sick, training (to replace sick workers), sick pay and caring for AIDS orphans. This is especially true if the sharp increase in adult mortality shifts the responsibility and blame from the family to the government in caring for these orphans.

On the level of the household, AIDS results in both the loss of income and increased spending on healthcare by the household. The income effects of this led to spending reduction as well as a substitution effect away from education and towards healthcare and funeral spending. A study in Côte d'Ivoire showed that households with an HIV/AIDS patient spent twice as much on medical expenses as other households.

With economic stimulus from the government, however, HIV/AIDS can be fought through the economy. With some money, HIV/AIDS patients will have to worry less about getting enough food and shelter and more about fighting their disease. However, if economic conditions aren't good, a person with HIV/AIDS may decide to become a sex trade worker to earn more money. As a result, more people become infected with HIV/AIDS.

== Relationship to GDP ==
UNAIDS, WHO and the United Nations Development Programme have documented a correlation between the decreasing life expectancies and the lowering of gross national product in many African countries with prevalence rates of 10% or more. Indeed, since 1992 predictions that AIDS would slow economic growth in these countries have been published. The degree of impact depended on assumptions about the extent to which illness would be funded by savings and who would be infected.

Conclusions reached from models of the growth trajectories of 30 sub-Saharan economies over the period 1990–2025 were that the economic growth rates of these countries would be between 0.56 and 1.47% lower. The impact on gross domestic product (GDP) per capita was less conclusive. However, in 2000, the rate of growth of Africa's per capita GDP was in fact reduced by 0.7% per year from 1990 to 1997 with a further 0.3% per year lower in countries also affected by malaria. The forecast now is that the growth of GDP for these countries will undergo a further reduction of between 0.5 and 2.6% per annum. However, these estimates may be an underestimate, as they do not look at the effects on output per capita.

== Response in sub-Saharan Africa ==
Many governments in sub-Saharan Africa denied that there was a problem for years, and are only now starting to work towards solutions. Underfunding is a problem in all areas of HIV prevention when compared to even conservative estimates of the problems.

Recent research by the Overseas Development Institute (ODI) has suggested that the private sector has begun to recognize the impact of HIV/AIDS on the bottom line, both directly and indirectly. It is estimated that a company can generate an average return of US$3 for every US$1 invested in employee health due to a reduced absenteeism, better productivity and reduction in employee turnover. Indirectly there are also important implications on the supply chain. Many multi-national corporations (MNCs) have therefore gotten involved in HIV/AIDS initiatives of three main types: a community-based partnerships, supply chain support, and sector-based initiatives.

The launching of the world's first official HIV/AIDS Toolkit in Zimbabwe on October 3, 2006, is a product of collaborative work between the International Federation of Red Cross and Red Crescent Societies, World Health Organization and the Southern Africa HIV/AIDS Information Dissemination Service. It is for the strengthening of people living with HIV/AIDS and nurses by minimal external support. The package, which is in form of eight modules focusing on basic facts about HIV and AIDS, was pre-tested in Zimbabwe in March 2006 to determine its adaptability. It disposes, among other things, categorized guidelines on clinical management, education and counseling of people with AIDS at community level.

== Copenhagen Consensus ==
The Copenhagen Consensus is a project that seeks to establish priorities for advancing global welfare using methodologies based on the theory of welfare economics. The participants are all economists, with the focus of the project a rational prioritization based on economic analysis. The project is based on the contention that, in spite of the billions of dollars spent on global challenges by the United Nations, the governments of wealthy nations, foundations, charities, and non-governmental organizations, the money spent on problems such as malnutrition and climate change is not sufficient to meet many internationally agreed targets. The highest priority was assigned to implementing new measures to prevent the spread of HIV and AIDS. The economists estimated that an investment of $27 billion could avert nearly 30 million new infections by 2010.

== See also ==
- Economic impact analysis
