= Statistical murder =

When a business or regulator uses limited funds to take an action that saves a limited number of lives, instead of an alternative action that would save more lives, this decision is sometimes called statistical murder. This phrase is currently primarily a term of political advocacy, used to draw attention to unwise decision making that either is not the most effective available or is potentially even harmful.

This phrase is a diffuse neologism. The phrase originated in the early 1990s with Professor John D. Graham, a tenured professor of policy and decision sciences at Harvard University's school of Public Health and director of the Harvard Center for Risk Analysis. This phrase appears in the Congressional Record in February, 1995 where he is quoted thus "John Graham, a Harvard professor, who said, 'Sound science means saving the most lives and achieving the most ecological protection with our scarce budgets. Without sound science, we are engaging in a form of "statistical murder," where we squander our resources on phantom risks when our families continue to be endangered by real risks." In 2001 he was appointed the head of the U.S. Office of Information and Regulatory Affairs in the Office of Management and Budget by George W. Bush, making him the top regulator for the United States. Because the analysis underlying the term was controversial among those interested in U.S. government policy, the senate confirmation process for nomination made the term more widely known.

To show that something is statistical murder requires that a comparative risk analysis be done on the available alternatives. This is akin to a cost-benefit analysis but does not entail the translation of lives and health into dollars. However, if other types of benefits are to also be evaluated, the comparative risk analysis approach may not viable, so a cost-benefit analysis must be done.

Additionally, the concept implies that the inefficiently spent resources could in fact be transferred to a more effective alternative. This requires that regulators and policy makers with budgetary authority at least allow such transfers and preferably use cost-benefit analysis to plan the budgeting. This was not the practice at the time the phrase was coined, and has not yet become standard practice in the U.S.

== Criticism of concept ==
Some people object to the required analysis because they believe it is always wrong to put a financial value on human life. They would have no objection to a risk assessment because it only measures lives lost. However, with this limitation it also cannot value any effects other than the number of human lives lost - including non-fatal human diseases, effects on non-human species, and effects on human activities and enjoyment.

It is quite possible to make errors in the statistics used to do the analysis, and in 2002 Richard Parker, a law professor at the University of Connecticut, argued that all the widely published studies suffered from unacceptable flaws.

An alternative view, taken by some policy analysts, is that it is not sufficient to look solely at outcomes, but also at feelings. If a risk is perceived to be significant, but is in fact insignificant, it may nonetheless be appropriate to respond in some way to that risk. Proponents of this view suggest using an expected utility calculation instead.
