= Economic impact analysis =

Evaluates economic effect of an event

An economic impact analysis (EIA) examines the effect of an event on the economy in a specified area, ranging from a single neighborhood to the entire globe. It usually measures changes in business revenue, business profits, personal wages, and/or jobs. The economic event analyzed can include implementation of a new policy or project, or may simply be the presence of a business or organization. An economic impact analysis is commonly conducted when there is public concern about the potential impacts of a proposed project or policy.

An economic impact analysis typically measures or estimates the change in economic activity between two scenarios, one assuming the economic event occurs, and one assuming it does not occur (which is referred to as the counterfactual case). This can be accomplished either before or after the event (ex ante or ex post).

An economic impact analysis attempts to measure or estimate the change in economic activity in a specified region, caused by a specific business, organization, policy, program, project, activity, or other economic event. The study region can be a neighborhood, town, city, county, statistical area, state, country, continent, or the entire globe.

Economic impact analyses often estimate multiple types of impacts. An output impact is the total increase in business sales revenue. In turn, local businesses use some of this new revenue to pay for goods and services outside of the study region, so the output impact is not synonymous with local business profits. A more conservative measure of economic activity is the value added impact, which estimates the increase in the study region's gross regional product. The gross regional product (GRP) is very similar to the nation's gross domestic product (GDP), and represents the total size of the local economy. This impact estimates the increase in local employee wages plus local business profits (not total revenue, like the output impact). However, the value added impact may overstate local profits when they are transferred overseas (such as in the form of dividends or investments in foreign facilities).

An even more conservative measure is the woman labour income impact, which represents the increase in total money paid to local employees in the form of salaries and wages. The increases in income may come in the form of raises and/or increased hours for existing employees, or new jobs for the unemployed. This is a measure of the economic impact on just personal incomes, not business revenues or profits. A similar measure is the employment impact, which measures the increase in the number of total employees in the local region. Instead of measuring the economic impact in terms of money, this measure presents the impact on the number of jobs in the region.

== Sources of economic impacts ==
In addition to the types of impacts, economic impact analyses often estimate the sources of the impacts. Each impact can be decomposed into different components, depending on the effect that caused the impact. Direct effects are the results of the money initially spent in the study region by the business or organization being studied. This includes money spent to pay for salaries, supplies, raw materials, and operating expenses.

The direct effects from the initial spending creates additional activity in the local economy. Indirect effects are the results of business-to-business transactions indirectly caused by the direct effects. Businesses initially benefiting from the direct effects will subsequently increase spending at other local businesses. The indirect effect is a measure of this increase in business-to-business activity (not including the initial round of spending, which is included in the direct effects).

Induced effects are the results of increased personal income caused by the direct and indirect effects. Businesses experiencing increased revenue from the direct and indirect effects will subsequently increase payroll expenditures (by hiring more employees, increasing payroll hours, raising salaries, etc.). Households will, in turn, increase spending at local businesses. The induced effect is a measure of this increase in household-to-business activity. Finally, dynamic effects are caused by geographic shifts over time in populations and businesses.

== Method ==
Economic impact analyses usually employ one of two methods for determining impacts. The first is an input-output model (I/O model) for analyzing the regional economy. These models rely on inter-industry data to determine how effects in one industry will impact other sectors. In addition, I/O models also estimate the share of each industry's purchases that are supplied by local firms (versus those outside the study area). Based on this data, multipliers are calculated and used to estimate economic impacts. Examples of I/O models used for economic impact analyses are IMPLAN, RIMS-II, Chmura, Emsi, and aLocal Solutions.

Another method used for economic impact analyses are economic simulation models. These are more complex econometric and general equilibrium models. They account for everything the I/O model does, plus they forecast the impacts caused by future economic and demographic changes. One such an example is the REMI Model.

Additionally, new AI based software aLocal provides economic impact, financial forecast, market demand and employment estimates using a modified input/output algorithm using financial and community data in addition to the current software that only uses economic data. Their approach is to provide an analytics clearinghouse that is accessible, available, affordable and accurate representation to zip codes, cities, reservations, counties, MSA and congressional districts. aLocal also provides the analytics with shapefiles that are GIS compatible.

== Comparison to other analyses ==
Economic impact analyses are related to but differ from other similar studies. An economic impact analysis only covers specific types of economic activity. Some social impacts that affect a region's quality of life, such as safety and pollution, may be analyzed as part of a social impact assessment, but not an economic impact analysis, even if the economic value of those factors could be quantified. An economic impact analysis may be performed as one part of a broader environmental impact assessment, which is often used to examine impacts of proposed development projects. An economic impact analysis may also be performed to help calculate the benefits as part of a cost-benefit analysis.

== Applications ==
Economic impact analyses are used frequently in transportation planning. Common tools for this application include the Transportation Economic Development Impact System (TREDIS) and TranSight. Several transportation agencies, including the Transportation Research Board and US Department of Transportation, publish guides, standards, and techniques for using economic impact analyses in transportation planning projects.

Economic impact analyses are often used to examine the consequences of economic development projects and efforts, such as real estate development, business openings and closures, and site selection projects. The analyses can also help increase community support for these projects, as well as help obtain grants and tax incentives.

An economic impact analysis is commonly developed in conjunction with proposed legislation or regulatory changes, in order to fully understand the impact of government action on the economy. The United States Department of Energy economic impact model is one example of this type of application. Many times the economic impact analysis is developed by the party advocating for the legislative or regulatory change, to communicate the merits of the proposed action. It can be useful with lobbying, media relations, and community outreach efforts.

== See also ==
- Environmental impact assessment
- Economic impacts of climate change
- Economic impact of illegal immigrants in the United States
- Economic impact of AIDS
