= Transportation Economic Development Impact System =

Economic analysis system

TREDIS
- Developer: Economic Development Research Group
- Operating system: Web-based, independent of user operating system
- Type: Economic evaluation
- Website: www.tredis.com

Transportation Economic Development Impact System (TREDIS) is an economic analysis system sold by consulting firm Economic Development Research Group that is used in planning major transportation investments in the US and Canada. The role of economic impact analysis and TREDIS in the transportation planning process is explained in guidebooks of the US Department of Transportation and the American Association of State Highway and Transportation Officials.

TREDIS has been most commonly used for assessing the expected economic impacts of statewide highway programs, regional multi-modal plans and public transport investment. Its history and theoretical foundation are explained in peer reviewed journal articles.

== How It Works ==
TREDIS has a series of modules that calculate different forms of impacts and benefits. One module is an accounting framework that calculates user benefits, including impacts on cargo transportation and commuting costs, based on transportation forecasting results. A second module calculates wider economic development benefits, including impacts on business productivity, economic development and multiplier effects from the input-output analysis. It applies an economic model to estimate impacts on jobs, income, gross regional product and business output, by sector of the economy. A third module applies cost-benefit analysis from alternative perspectives.

== See also ==
- Transport
- Economic impact analysis
- Cost-benefit analysis
- Input-output analysis
