= Prevention of HIV/AIDS =

Way to Stay Away from HIV/AIDS

HIV prevention refers to practices that aim to prevent the spread of the human immunodeficiency virus (HIV). HIV prevention practices may be undertaken by individuals to protect their own health and the health of those in their community, or may be instituted by governments and community-based organizations as public health policies. Prevention can include a lot of different combinations of biomedical strategies and great community-based interventions like education and testing through outreach programs.

== Prevention strategies ==
Interventions for the prevention of HIV include the use of:

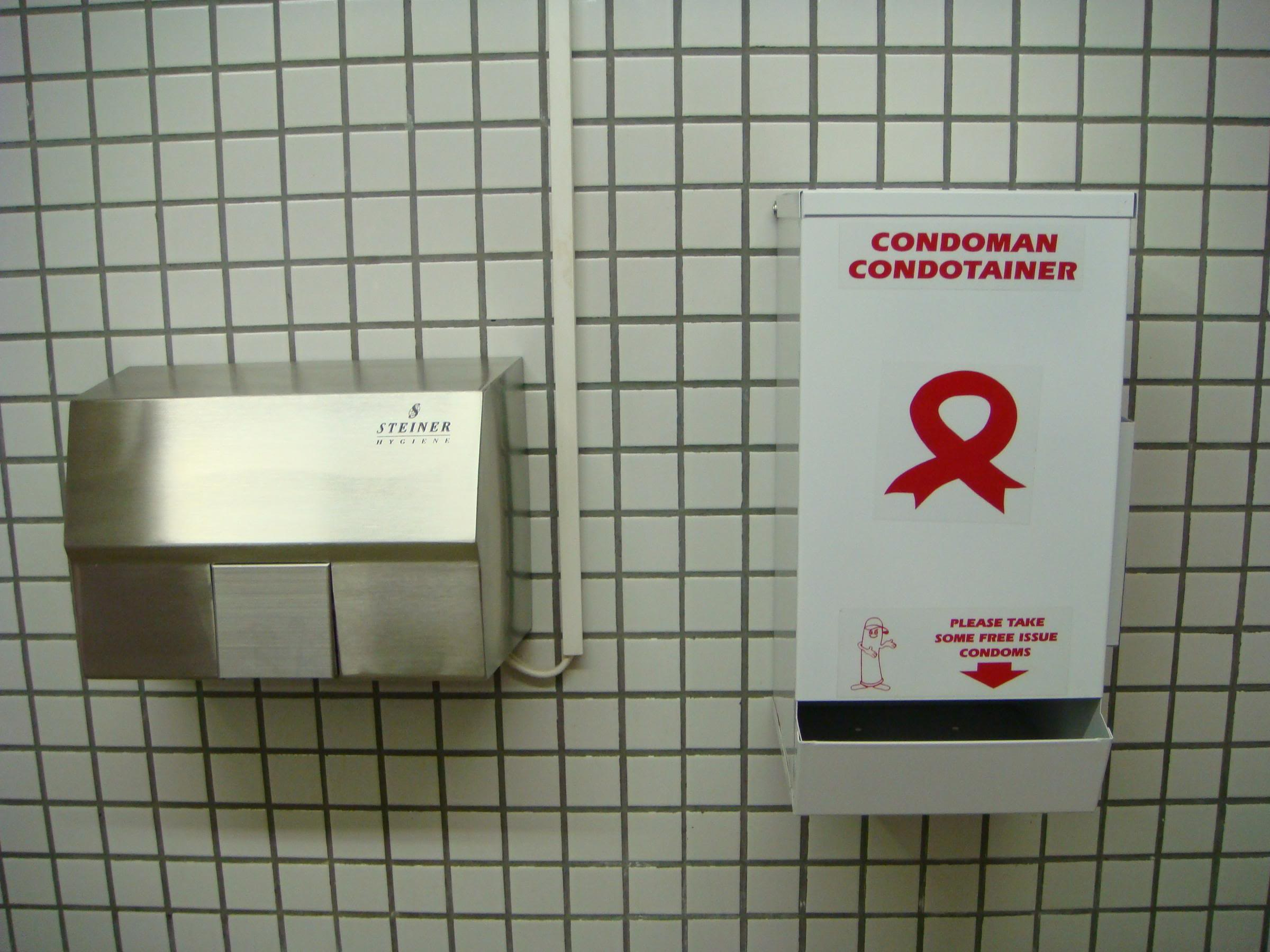
AIDS Prevention - Condom dispensers in toilets

- Barrier methods, such as the use of condoms or dental dams during sexual activity
- Antiretroviral medicines or antiretroviral therapy (ART)
- Pre-exposure prophylaxis
- Post-exposure prophylaxis
- Voluntary male circumcision (see also Circumcision and HIV)
- Microbicides for sexually transmitted diseases
- Low dead space syringes

The consistent, correct use of condoms is one proven method for preventing the spread of HIV during sexual intercourse. In high income countries, Prevention of Mother to Child Transmission Programs (PMTC) including HIV testing of pregnant women, antiretroviral treatment, counselling about infant feeding, and safe obstetric practices (avoiding invasive procedures) have reduced mother-to-child transmission to less than 1%.

Treatment as prevention (TasP) is also effective; in sero-different couples (where one partner is HIV-positive and the other is HIV negative), HIV is significantly less likely to be transmitted to the uninfected partner if the HIV positive partner is on treatment. It is now known that an if HIV-positive person has an undetectable viral load, there is no risk of HIV transmission to a sexual partner.

Increased risk of contracting HIV correlates with the presence of co-infections, particularly other sexually transmissible infections. Medical professionals recommend treatment or prevention of other infections such as herpes, hepatitis A, hepatitis B, hepatitis C, human papillomavirus, syphilis, gonorrhea, and tuberculosis as an indirect way to prevent the spread of HIV infection. Doctors treat these conditions with pharmaceutical interventions and/or vaccination. Nevertheless, it is not known if treating other sexually transmitted infections on a population scale is effective in preventing HIV.

=== Harm reduction and social strategies ===
Harm reduction is defined as "policies, programmes and practices that aim to minimise negative health, social and legal impacts associated with drug use, drug policies and drug laws". The World Health Organization (WHO) recognizes that harm reduction is central to the prevention of HIV amongst people who inject drugs (PWID) and their sexual and drug using partners. Social strategies do not require any drug or object to be effective, but rather require persons to change their behaviors to gain protection from HIV. Some social strategies include:

- Needle-and-syringe programmes
- Supervised injection site
- Sex education
- LGBT sex education
- Safe sex
- Serosorting
- Sexual abstinence

Each of these strategies has widely differing levels of efficacy, social acceptance, and acceptance in the medical and scientific communities.

Populations who access HIV testing are less likely to engage in behaviors with high risk of contracting HIV, so HIV testing is almost always a part of any strategy to encourage people to change their behaviors to become less likely to contract HIV. Over 60 countries impose some form of travel restriction, either for short or long-term stays, for people infected with HIV.

=== Advertising and campaigns ===
Persuasive messages delivered through health advertising and social marketing campaigns which are designed to educate people about the risks of HIV/AIDS and simple prevention strategies are also an important way of preventing HIV. These persuasive messages have successfully increased people's knowledge about HIV. More importantly, information sent out through advertising and social marketing also proves to be effective in promoting more favorable attitudes and intentions toward future condom use, though they did not bring significant change in actual behaviors except those were targeting at specific behavioral skills.

A 2020 systematic review of 16 studies found that financial education improved self-efficacy and lowered vulnerability to HIV in young people in low and middle income countries. Many of the studies in the review combined financial education with sexual health education and/or counselling.

Research in health communication also found that importance of advocating critical skills and informing available resources are higher for people with lower social power, but not necessarily true for people with more power. African American audiences need to be educated about strategies they could take to efficiently manage themselves in health behaviors such as mood control, management of drugs, and proactive planning for sexual behaviors. However, these things are not as important for European Americans.

=== Sexual contact ===
==== Condoms and gels ====
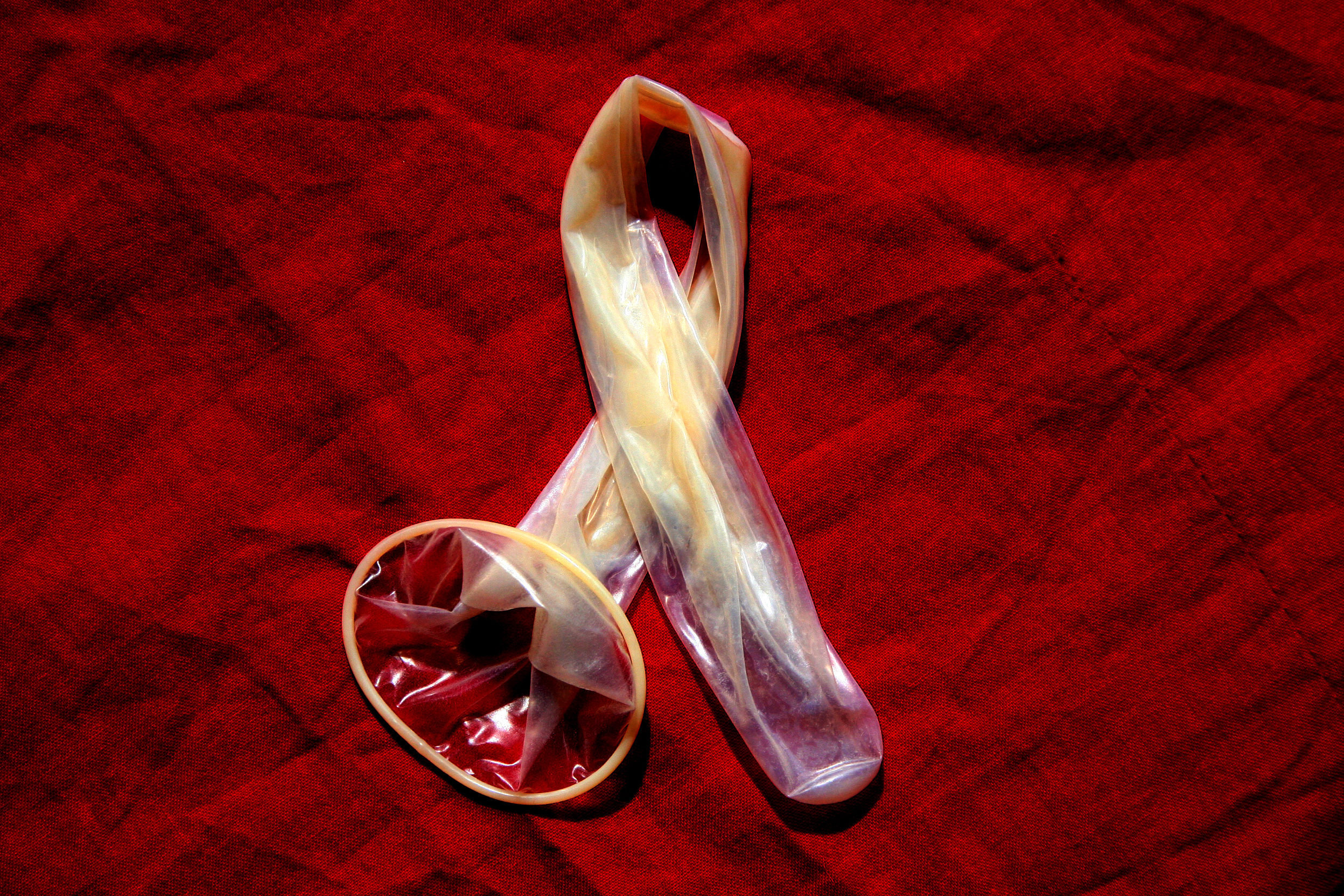
Condom in the shape of an AIDS ribbon

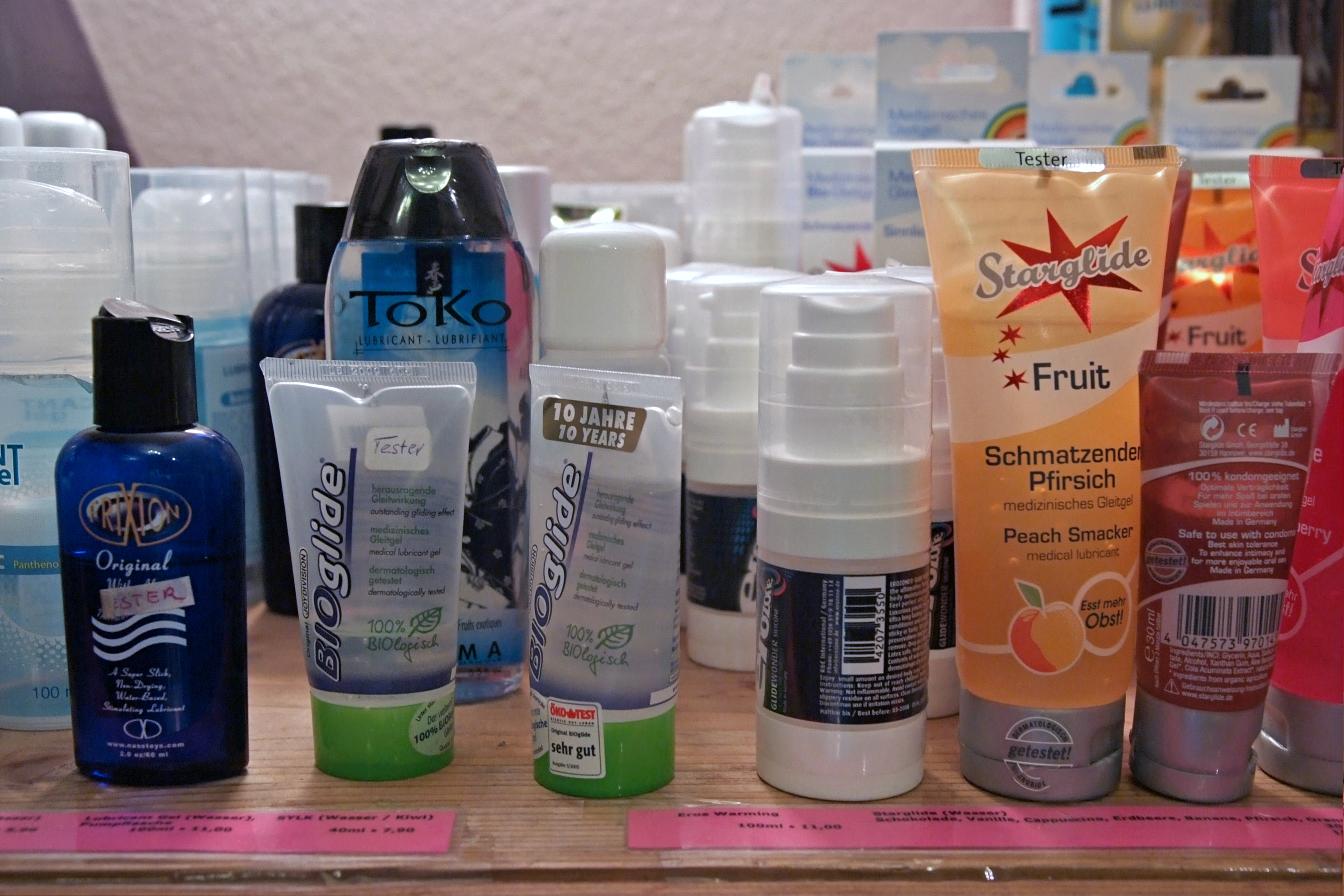
Various personal lubricants

Consistent condom use reduces the risk of heterosexual HIV transmission by about 80% over the long-term. Where one partner of a couple has HIV infection, consistent condom use results in rates of HIV infection for the uninfected person below 1% per year. Some data support the equivalence of internal condoms to latex condoms, but the evidence is not definitive. As of January 2019, condoms are available inside 30% of prisons globally. Use of the spermicide nonoxynol-9 may increase the risk of transmission because it causes vaginal and rectal irritation. A vaginal gel containing tenofovir, a reverse transcriptase inhibitor, when used immediately before sex, was shown to reduce infection rates by roughly 40% among African women.

==== Voluntary male circumcision ====
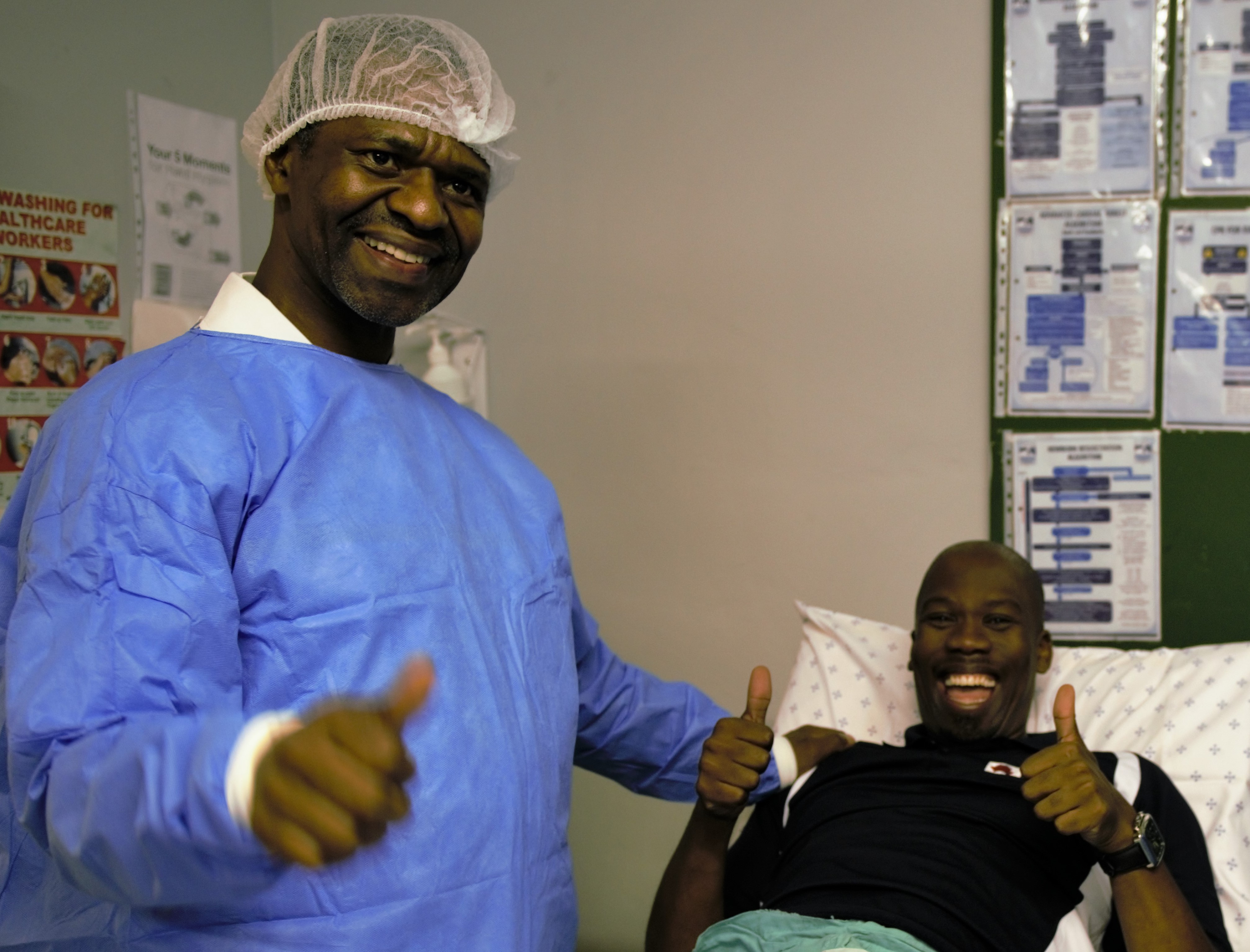
South Africa 1 millionth voluntary medical male circumcision

Studies conducted in sub-Saharan Africa have found that circumcision reduces the risk of HIV infection in heterosexual men between 38 and 66% over two years. Based on these studies, the World Health Organization and UNAIDS both recommended male circumcision as a method of preventing female-to-male HIV transmission in 2007. Whether it protects against male-to-female transmission is disputed and whether it is of benefit in developed countries and among men who have sex with men is undetermined. For men who have sex with men there is some evidence that the penetrative partner has a lower chance of contracting HIV. Some experts fear that a lower perception of vulnerability among circumcised men may result in more sexual risk-taking behavior, thus negating its preventive effects. Women who have undergone female genital mutilation have an increased risk of HIV.

The African studies on which this information is based have been criticized for methodological flaws. Svoboda and Howe compare them to the "lowest common denominator", citing "selection bias, randomization bias, experimenter bias, inadequate blinding, participant expectation bias, lack of placebo control, inadequate equipoise, excessive attrition of subjects, failure to investigate non-sexual HIV transmission, lead time bias, and time-out discrepancy." In addition, the 60% figure for risk reduction is dismissed as relative and misleading, with an absolute figure of only 1.3%, which is considered effectively meaningless given the "background noise produced by numerous sources of bias". They also point out that the United States has both the highest rates of circumcision and HIV/STD infections in the industrialized world, casting serious doubt that the former prevents the latter. There are also major epidemiological differences between regions: in Africa, HIV is commonly spread via inadequate infection prevention practices in health clinics, while in the US, the primary routes of infection are sharing equipment amongst people who use drugs and condomless anal intercourse among MSM. Additional criticisms are offered by George Hill: "Our results clearly show that these African CRFs were methodologically flawed from start to finish... From the start, there was almost nothing correct with these studies. It was quite clear that these studies were unethical. They would never have been approved by a single ethics committee in the United States."

==== Education and health promotion ====
Programs encouraging sexual abstinence do not appear to affect subsequent HIV risk in high-income countries. Evidence for a benefit from peer education is equally poor. Comprehensive sexual education provided at school may decrease high risk behavior. A substantial minority of young people continue to engage in high-risk practices despite HIV/AIDS knowledge, underestimating their own risk of becoming infected with HIV.

=== Before exposure ===
Early treatment of HIV-infected people with antiretrovirals protected 96% of partners from infection. Pre-exposure prophylaxis with a daily dose of tenofovir with or without emtricitabine is effective in a number of groups, including men who have sex with men, couples where one is HIV positive, and young heterosexuals in Africa. Within the MSM community, the greatest barrier to PrEP use has been the stigma surrounding HIV and gay men. Gay men on PrEP have experienced "slut-shaming". Numerous other barriers were identified, including lack of quality LGBTQ care, cost, and adherence to medication use.

Universal precautions within the health-care environment are believed to be effective in decreasing the risk of HIV. Intravenous drug use is an important risk factor and harm reduction strategies such as needle-exchange programmes and opioid substitution therapy appear effective in decreasing this risk.

Needle exchange programs (also known as syringe exchange programs) are effective in preventing HIV among IDUs and in the broader community. Pharmacy sales of syringes and physician prescription of syringes have been also found to reduce HIV risk. Supervised injection facilities are also understood to address HIV risk in the most-at-risk populations. Multiple legal and attitudinal barriers limit the scale and coverage of these "harm reduction" programs in the United States and elsewhere around the world.

The American Centers for Disease Control and Prevention (CDC) conducted a study in partnership with the Thailand Ministry of Public Health to ascertain the effectiveness of providing people who inject drugs illicitly with daily doses of the antiretroviral drug tenofovir as a prevention measure. The results of the study revealed a 48.9% reduced incidence of the virus among the group of subjects who received the drug, in comparison to the control group who received a placebo. The principal investigator of the study stated in the Lancet medical journal: "We now know that pre-exposure prophylaxis can be a potentially vital option for HIV prevention in people at very high risk for infection, whether through sexual transmission or injecting drug use."

=== After exposure ===
A course of antiretrovirals administered within 48 to 72 hours after exposure to HIV-positive blood or genital secretions is referred to as post-exposure prophylaxis. The use of the single agent zidovudine reduces the risk of subsequent HIV infection fivefold following a needle stick injury. Treatment is recommended after sexual assault when the perpetrators are known to be HIV positive, but is controversial when their HIV status is unknown. Current treatment regimens typically use lopinavir/ritonavir and lamivudine/zidovudine or emtricitabine/tenofovir and may decrease the risk further. The duration of treatment is usually four weeks and is associated with significant rates of adverse effects (for zidovudine about 70% including: nausea 24%, fatigue 22%, emotional distress 13%, and headaches 9%).

=== Follow-up care ===
Strategies to reduce recurrence rates of HIV have been successful in preventing reinfection. Treatment facilities encourage those previously treated for HIV return to ensure that the infection is being successfully managed. New strategies to encouraging retesting have been the use of text messaging and email. These methods of recall are now used along with phone calls and letters.

=== Mother-to-child ===
Programs to prevent the transmission of HIV from mothers to children can reduce rates of transmission by 92–99%. This primarily involves the use of a combination of antivirals during pregnancy and after birth in the infant but also potentially include bottle feeding rather than breastfeeding. If replacement feeding is acceptable, feasible, affordable, sustainable and safe mothers should avoid breast-feeding their infants; however, exclusive breast-feeding is recommended during the first months of life if this is not the case. If exclusive breast feeding is carried out the provision of extended antiretroviral prophylaxis to the infant decreases the risk of transmission.

=== Vaccination ===
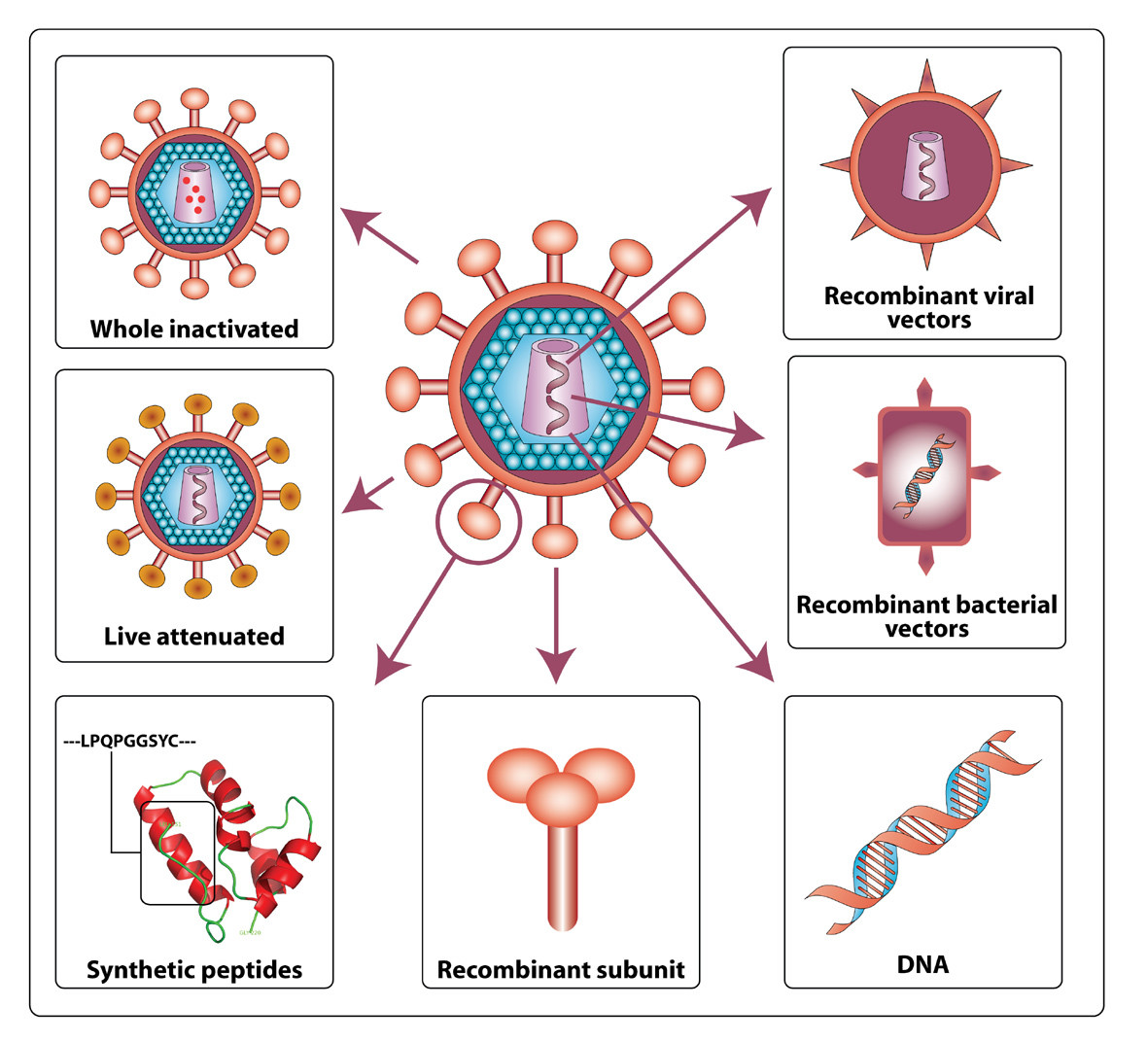
Various approaches for HIV vaccine development

As of 2020, no effective vaccine for HIV or AIDS is known. A single trial of the vaccine RV 144 found a partial efficacy rate around 30% and has stimulated optimism in the research community regarding developing a truly effective vaccine. Further trials of the vaccine are ongoing.

=== Gene therapy ===
Certain mutations on the CCR5 gene have been known to make certain people unable to catch AIDS. Modifying the CCR5 gene using gene therapy can thus make people unable to catch it either.

=== Legal system ===
Laws criminalizing HIV transmission have not been found an effective way to reduce HIV risk behavior, and may actually do more harm than good. In the past, many U.S. states criminalized the possession of needles without a prescription, even going so far as to arrest people as they leave private needle-exchange facilities. In jurisdictions where syringe prescription status presented a legal barrier to access, physician prescription programs had shown promise in addressing risky injection behaviors. Epidemiological research demonstrating that syringe access programs are both effective and cost-effective helped change state and local laws relating to needle-exchange program (NEP) operations and the status of syringe possession more broadly. As of 2006, 48 states in the United States authorized needle exchange in some form or allowed the purchase of sterile syringes without a prescription at pharmacies.

Removal of legal barriers to operation of NEPs and other syringe access initiatives has been identified as an important part of a comprehensive approach to reducing HIV transmission among injection drug users (IDUs). Legal barriers include both "law on the books" and "law on the streets", i.e., the actual practices of law enforcement officers, which may or may not reflect the formal law. Changes in syringe and drug-control policy can be ineffective in reducing such barriers if police continue to treat syringe possession as a crime or participation in NEP as evidence of criminal activity. Although most NEPs in the US are now operating legally, many report some form of police interference.

Research elsewhere has shown similar misalignment between "law on the books" and "law on the streets". For example, in Kyrgyzstan, although sex work, syringe sales, and possession of syringes are not criminalized and possession of small drug amounts has been decriminalized, gaps remain between these policies and law enforcement knowledge and practice. To optimize public health efforts targeting vulnerable groups, law enforcement personnel and public health policies should be closely aligned. Such alignment can be improved through policy, training, and coordination efforts.

=== Quality in prevention ===
The EU-wide Joint Action on Improving Quality in HIV Prevention is seeking to increase the effectiveness of HIV prevention in Europe by using practical quality assurance (QA) and quality improvement (QI) tools.

== History ==
=== 1980s ===
The Centers for Disease Control was the first organization to recognize the pandemic which came to be called AIDS. Their announcement came on June 5, 1981, when one of their journals published an article reporting five cases of pneumonia, caused by Pneumocystis jirovecii, all in gay men living in Los Angeles.

In May 1983, scientists isolated a retrovirus which was later called HIV from an AIDS patient in France. At this point, the disease called AIDS was proposed to be caused by HIV, and people began to consider prevention of HIV infection as a strategy for preventing AIDS.

In the 1980s, public policy makers and most of the public could not understand that the overlap of sexual and needle-sharing networks with the general community had somehow lead to many thousands of people worldwide becoming infected with HIV. In many countries, leaders and most of the general public denied both that AIDS and the risk behaviors which spread HIV existed outside of concentrated populations.

In 1987, the United States FDA approved AZT as the first pharmaceutical treatment for AIDS. Around the same time, ACT UP was formed, with one of the group's first goals being to find a way to get access to pharmaceutical drugs to treat HIV. When AZT was made publicly available, it was extremely expensive and unaffordable to all but the most wealthy AIDS patients. The availability of medicine but the lack of access to it sparked large protests around FDA offices.

=== From 2003 ===
In 2003, Swaziland and Botswana reported nearly four out of 10 people were HIV positive. Festus Mogae, president of Botswana, admitted huge infrastructure problems to the international community and requested foreign intervention in the form of consulting in health care setup and antiretroviral drug distribution programs. In Swaziland, the government chose not to immediately address the problem in the way that international health agencies advised, so many people died. In world media, the governments of African countries began to similarly be described as participating in the effort to prevent HIV actively or less actively.

There came to be international discussion about why HIV rates in Africa were so high, because if the cause were known, then prevention strategies could be developed. Previously, some researchers had suggested that HIV in Africa was widespread because of unsafe medical practices which somehow transferred blood to patients through procedures such as vaccination, injection, or reuse of equipment. In March 2003, the WHO released a statement that almost all infections were, in fact, the result of unsafe practices in heterosexual intercourse.

In response to the rising HIV rates, Cardinal Alfonso López Trujillo, speaking on behalf of the Vatican, said that not only was the use of condoms immoral, but also that condoms were ineffective in preventing HIV. The cardinal was highly criticized by the world health community, who were trying to promote condom use as a way to prevent the spread of HIV. The WHO later conducted a study showing that condoms are 90% effective at preventing HIV.

In 2001, the United States began a war in Afghanistan related to fighting the Taliban. The Taliban, however, had opposed local opium growers and the heroin trade; when the government of Afghanistan fell during the war, opium production was unchecked. By 2003, the world market had an increase in the available heroin supply; in former Soviet states especially, an increase in HIV infection was due to injection drug use. Efforts were renewed to prevent HIV related to sharing needles.

=== From 2011 ===
In July 2011, it was announced by the WHO and UNAIDS that a once-daily antiretroviral tablet could significantly reduce the risk of HIV transmission in heterosexual couples. These findings were based on the results of two trials conducted in Kenya and Uganda, and Botswana.

The Partners PrEP (pre-exposure prophylaxis) trial was funded by the Bill & Melinda Gates Foundation and conducted by the International Clinical Research Center at the University of Washington. The trial followed 4758 heterosexual couples in Kenya and Uganda, in which one individual was HIV positive and the other was HIV negative. The uninfected (HIV negative) partner was given either a once-daily tenofovir tablet, a once-daily combination tablet of tenofovir and emtricitabine, or a placebo tablet containing no antiretroviral drug. These couples also received counselling and had access to free male and female condoms. In couples taking tenofovir and tenofovir/emtricitabine, there was a 62% and 73% decrease, respectively, in the number of HIV infections as compared to couples who were receiving the placebo.

A similar result was observed with the TDF2 trial, conducted by the United States Centers for Disease Control in partnership with the Botswana Ministry of Health. The trial followed 1200 HIV negative men and women in Francistown, Botswana, a city known to have one of the world's highest HIV infection rates. Participants received either a once-daily tenofovir/emtricitabine combination tablet or a placebo. In those taking the antiretroviral treatment, there was found to be a 63% decrease in the risk of acquiring HIV, as compared to those receiving the placebo.

Since the HIV-1 virus inserts its genome permanently into patients' DNA, often requiring patients to be on medication for the rest of their lives, a team of Temple University School of Medicine researchers have designed a way to "snip out" the integrated HIV-1 genes for good. This is one step on the path toward a possible cure for AIDS and the first successful attempt to eliminate latent HIV-1 virus from human cells.

In a study published by the Proceedings of the National Academy of Sciences (PNAS), Khalili and colleagues detail how they created molecular tools to delete the HIV-1 proviral DNA. When deployed, a combination of DNA-snipping enzyme called a nuclease and targeting strand of RNA called a guide RNA (gRNA) hunt down the viral genome and excise the HIV-1 DNA. From there, the cell's own gene repair machinery takes over, soldering the loose ends of the genome back together – resulting in virus-free cells.

Since HIV-1 is never cleared by the immune system, removal of the virus is required in order to cure the disease. The same technique could theoretically be used against a variety of viruses. The research shows that these molecular tools also hold promise as a therapeutic vaccine; cells armed with the nuclease-RNA combination proved impervious to HIV infection.

== See also ==
- AIDS education and training centers
- HIV denialism
- List of global issues
- Information-Motivation-Behavioral Skills Model
- Relationship between education and HIV/AIDS
- TeachAids
- World AIDS Day
