= Cost–benefit analysis =

Systematic approach to estimating the strengths and weaknesses of alternatives

Cost–benefit analysis (CBA), sometimes also called benefit–cost analysis, is a systematic approach to estimating the strengths and weaknesses of alternatives. It is used to determine options which provide the best approach to achieving benefits while preserving savings in, for example, transactions, activities, and functional business requirements. A CBA may be used to compare completed or potential courses of action, and to estimate or evaluate the value against the cost of a decision, project, or policy. It is commonly used to evaluate business or policy decisions (particularly public policy), commercial transactions, and project investments. For example, the U.S. Securities and Exchange Commission must conduct cost–benefit analyses before instituting regulations or deregulations.

CBA has two main applications:

1. To determine if an investment (or decision) is sound, ascertaining if – and by how much – its benefits outweigh its costs.
2. To provide a basis for comparing investments (or decisions), comparing the total expected cost of each option with its total expected benefits.

CBA is related to cost-effectiveness analysis. Benefits and costs in CBA are expressed in monetary terms and are adjusted for the time value of money; all flows of benefits and costs over time are expressed on a common basis in terms of their net present value, regardless of whether they are incurred at different times. Other related techniques include cost–utility analysis, risk–benefit analysis, economic impact analysis, fiscal impact analysis, and social return on investment (SROI) analysis.

Cost–benefit analysis is often used by organizations to appraise the desirability of a given policy. It is an analysis of the expected balance of benefits and costs, including an account of any alternatives and the status quo. CBA helps predict whether the benefits of a policy outweigh its costs (and by how much), relative to other alternatives. This allows the ranking of alternative policies in terms of a cost–benefit ratio. Generally, accurate cost–benefit analysis identifies choices which increase welfare from a utilitarian perspective. Assuming an accurate CBA, changing the status quo by implementing the alternative with the lowest cost–benefit ratio can improve Pareto efficiency. Although CBA can offer an informed estimate of the best alternative, a perfect appraisal of all present and future costs and benefits is difficult; perfection, in economic efficiency and social welfare, is not guaranteed.

The value of a cost–benefit analysis depends on the accuracy of the individual cost and benefit estimates. Comparative studies indicate that such estimates are often flawed, preventing improvements in Pareto and Kaldor–Hicks efficiency. Interest groups may attempt to include (or exclude) significant costs in an analysis to influence its outcome.

== History ==
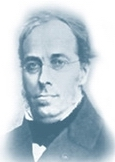
French engineer and economist Jules Dupuit, credited with the creation of cost–benefit analysis

The concept of CBA dates back to an 1848 article by Jules Dupuit, and was formalized in subsequent works by Alfred Marshall. Jules Dupuit pioneered this approach by first calculating "the social profitability of a project like the construction of a road or bridge" In an attempt to answer this, Dupuit began to look at the utility users would gain from the project. He determined that the best method of measuring utility is by learning one's willingness to pay for something. By taking the sum of each user's willingness to pay, Dupuit illustrated that the social benefit of the thing (bridge or road or canal) could be measured. Some users may be willing to pay nearly nothing, others much more, but the sum of these would shed light on the benefit of it. It should be reiterated that Dupuit was not suggesting that the government perfectly price-discriminate and charge each user exactly what they would pay. Rather, their willingness to pay provided a theoretical foundation on the societal worth or benefit of a project. The cost of the project proved much simpler to calculate. Simply taking the sum of the materials and labor, in addition to the maintenance afterward, would give one the cost. Now, the costs and benefits of the project could be accurately analyzed, and an informed decision could be made.

The Corps of Engineers initiated the use of CBA in the US, after the Federal Navigation Act of 1936 mandated cost–benefit analysis for proposed federal-waterway infrastructure. The Flood Control Act of 1939 was instrumental in establishing CBA as federal policy, requiring that "the benefits to whomever they accrue [be] in excess of the estimated costs."

More recently, cost–benefit analysis has been applied to decisions regarding investments in cybersecurity-related activities (e.g., see the Gordon–Loeb model for decisions concerning cybersecurity investments).

=== Public policy ===
CBA's application to broader public policy began with the work of Otto Eckstein, who laid out a welfare economics foundation for CBA and its application to water-resource development in 1958. It was applied in the US to water quality, recreational travel, and land conservation during the 1960s, and the concept of option value was developed to represent the non-tangible value of resources such as national parks.

CBA was expanded to address the intangible and tangible benefits of public policies relating to mental illness, substance abuse, college education, and chemical waste. In the US, the National Environmental Policy Act of 1969 required CBA for regulatory programs; since then, other governments have enacted similar rules. Government guidebooks for the application of CBA to public policies include the Canadian guide for regulatory analysis, the Australian guide for regulation and finance, and the US guides for health-care and emergency-management programs.

=== Transportation investment ===
CBA for transport investment began in the UK with the M1 motorway project and was later used for many projects, including the London Underground's Victoria line. The New Approach to Appraisal (NATA) was later introduced by the Department for Transport, Environment and the Regions. This presented balanced cost–benefit results and detailed environmental impact assessments. NATA was first applied to national road schemes in the 1998 Roads Review, and was subsequently rolled out to all transport modes. Maintained and developed by the Department for Transport, it was a cornerstone of UK transport appraisal in 2011.

The European Union's Developing Harmonised European Approaches for Transport Costing and Project Assessment (HEATCO) project, part of the EU's Sixth Framework Programme, reviewed transport appraisal guidance of EU member states and found significant national differences. HEATCO aimed to develop guidelines to harmonise transport appraisal practice across the EU.

Transport Canada promoted CBA for major transport investments with the 1994 publication of its guidebook. US federal and state transport departments commonly apply CBA with a variety of software tools, including HERS, BCA.Net, StatBenCost, Cal-BC, and TREDIS. Guides are available from the Federal Highway Administration, Federal Aviation Administration, Minnesota Department of Transportation, California Department of Transportation (Caltrans), and the Transportation Research Board's Transportation Economics Committee.

== Accuracy ==
In health economics, CBA may be an inadequate measure because willingness-to-pay methods of determining the value of human life can be influenced by income level. Variants, such as cost–utility analysis, QALY and DALY to analyze the effects of health policies, may be more suitable.

For some environmental effects, cost–benefit analysis can be replaced by cost-effectiveness analysis. This is especially true when one type of physical outcome is sought, such as a reduction in energy use by an increase in energy efficiency. Using cost-effectiveness analysis is less laborious and time-consuming, since it does not involve the monetization of outcomes (which can be difficult in some cases).

It has been argued that if modern cost–benefit analyses had been applied to decisions such as whether to mandate the removal of lead from gasoline, block the construction of two proposed dams just above and below the Grand Canyon on the Colorado River, and regulate workers' exposure to vinyl chloride, the measures would not have been implemented (although all are considered highly successful). The US Clean Air Act has been cited in retrospective studies as a case in which benefits exceeded costs, but knowledge of the benefits (attributable largely to the benefits of reducing particulate pollution) was not available until many years later.

== Process ==
A generic cost–benefit analysis has the following steps:

1. Define the goals and objectives of the action.
2. List alternative actions.
3. List stakeholders.
4. Select measurement(s) and measure all cost and benefit elements.
5. Predict outcome of costs and benefits over the relevant time period.
6. Convert all costs and benefits into a common currency.
7. Apply a discount rate (usually a specific social discount rate).
8. Calculate the net present value of actions under consideration.
9. Perform sensitivity analysis.
10. Adopt the recommended course of action.

In United States regulatory policy, cost–benefit analysis is governed by OMB Circular A-4.

== Evaluation ==
CBA attempts to measure the positive or negative consequences of a project. A similar approach is used in the environmental analysis of total economic value. Both costs and benefits can be diverse. Costs tend to be most thoroughly represented in cost–benefit analyses due to relatively-abundant market data. The net benefits of a project may incorporate cost savings, public willingness to pay (implying that the public has no legal right to the benefits of the policy), or willingness to accept compensation (implying that the public has a right to the benefits of the policy) for the policy's welfare change. The guiding principle of evaluating benefits is to list all parties affected by an intervention and add the positive or negative value (usually monetary) that they ascribe to its effect on their welfare.

The actual compensation an individual would require to have their welfare unchanged by a policy is inexact at best. Surveys (stated preferences) or market behavior (revealed preferences) are often used to estimate compensation associated with a policy. Stated preferences are a direct way of assessing willingness to pay for an environmental feature, for example. Survey respondents often misreport their true preferences, however, and market behavior does not provide information about important non-market welfare impacts. Revealed preference is an indirect approach to individual willingness to pay. People make market choices of items with different environmental characteristics, for example, revealing the value placed on environmental factors.

The value of human life is controversial when assessing road-safety measures or life-saving medicines. Controversy can sometimes be avoided by using the related technique of cost–utility analysis, in which benefits are expressed in non-monetary units such as quality-adjusted life years. Road safety can be measured in cost per life saved, without assigning a financial value to the life. However, non-monetary metrics have limited usefulness for evaluating policies with substantially different outcomes. Other benefits may also accrue from a policy, and metrics such as cost per life saved may lead to a substantially different ranking of alternatives than CBA. In some cases, in addition to changing the benefit indicator, the cost–benefit analysis strategy is directly abandoned as a measure. In the 1980s, to ensure workers' safety, the US Supreme Court made an important decision to abandon the consideration of return on investment and instead seek the lowest cost–benefit to meet specific standards.

Another metric is valuing the environment, which in the 21st century is typically assessed by valuing ecosystem services to humans (such as air and water quality and pollution). Monetary values may also be assigned to other intangible effects such as business reputation, market penetration, or long-term enterprise strategy alignment.

== Time and discounting ==
CBA generally attempts to put all relevant costs and benefits on a common temporal footing, using time value of money calculations. This is often done by converting the future expected streams of costs ($C$) and benefits ($B$) into a present value amount with a discount rate ($r$) and the net present value defined as:
$$\text{NPV} = \sum_{t=0}^{\infty}{B_{t}-C_{t}\over{(1+r)^{t}}}$$
The selection of a discount rate for this calculation is subjective. A smaller rate values the current generation and future generations equally. Larger rates (a market rate of return, for example) reflects human present bias or hyperbolic discounting: valuing money which they will receive in the near future more than money they will receive in the distant future. Empirical studies suggest that people discount future benefits in a way similar to these calculations. The choice makes a large difference in assessing interventions with long-term effects. An example is the equity premium puzzle, which suggests that long-term returns on equities may be higher than they should be after controlling for risk and uncertainty. If so, market rates of return should not be used to determine the discount rate because they would undervalue the distant future.

=== Methods for choosing a discount rate ===
For publicly traded companies, it is possible to find a project's discount rate by using an equilibrium asset pricing model to find the required return on equity for the company and then assuming that the risk profile of a given project is similar to that the company faces. Commonly used models include the capital asset pricing model (CAPM):
$$r = r_{f} + \beta\left[\mathbb{E}(r_{M}) - r_{f} \right]$$
and the Fama-French model:
$$r = \underbrace{r_{f}}_{\text{Risk-Free Rate}} + \beta_{M}\underbrace{\left[\mathbb{E}(r_{M}) - r_{f} \right]}_{\text{Market Risk}} + \beta_{SMB}\underbrace{\left[\mathbb{E}(r_{S}) - \mathbb{E}(r_{B}) \right]}_{\text{Size Factor}} + \beta_{HML}\underbrace{\left[\mathbb{E}(r_{H}) - \mathbb{E}(r_{L}) \right]}_{\text{Value Factor}}$$
where the $\beta_{i}$ terms correspond to the factor loadings. A generalization of these methods can be found in arbitrage pricing theory, which allows for an arbitrary number of risk premiums in the calculation of the required return.

== Risk and uncertainty ==
Risk associated with project outcomes is usually handled with probability theory. Although it can be factored into the discount rate (to have uncertainty increasing over time), it is usually considered separately. Particular consideration is often given to agent risk aversion: preferring a situation with less uncertainty to one with greater uncertainty, even if the latter has a higher expected return.

Uncertainty in CBA parameters can be evaluated with a sensitivity analysis, which indicates how results respond to parameter changes. A more formal risk analysis may also be undertaken with the Monte Carlo method. However, even a low parameter of uncertainty does not guarantee the success of a project.

=== Principle of maximum entropy ===
Suppose that we have sources of uncertainty in a CBA that are best treated with the Monte Carlo method, and the distributions describing uncertainty are all continuous. How do we go about choosing the appropriate distribution to represent the sources of uncertainty? One popular method is to make use of the principle of maximum entropy, which states that the distribution with the best representation of current knowledge is the one with the largest entropy – defined for continuous distributions as:
$$H(X) = \mathbb{E}\left[ -\log f(X) \right] = -\int_{\mathcal{S}}f(x)\log f(x) dx$$
where $\mathcal{S}$ is the support set of a probability density function $f(x)$. Suppose that we impose a series of constraints that must be satisfied:

1. $f(x) \geq 0$, with equality outside of $\mathcal{S}$
2. $\int_{\mathcal{S}}f(x) dx =1$
3. $\int_{\mathcal{S}}r_{i}(x)f(x) dx = \alpha_{i}, \quad i = 1,...,m$

where the last equality is a series of moment conditions. Maximizing the entropy with these constraints leads to the functional:
$$J = \max_{f} \; \int_{\mathcal{S}} \left( -f\log f + \lambda_{0}f + \sum_{i=1}^{m}\lambda_{i}r_{i}f\right) dx$$
where the $\lambda_{i}$ are Lagrange multipliers. Maximizing this functional leads to the form of a maximum entropy distribution:
$$f(x) = \exp\left[ \lambda_{0} - 1 + \sum_{i=1}^{m}\lambda_{i}r_{i}(x) \right]$$
There is a direct correspondence between the form of a maximum entropy distribution and the exponential family. Examples of commonly used continuous maximum entropy distributions in simulations include:

- Uniform distribution
  - No constraints are imposed over the support set $\mathcal{S}\in[a,b]$
  - It is assumed that we have maximum ignorance about the uncertainty
- Exponential distribution
  - Specified mean $\mathbb{E}(X)$ over the support set $\mathcal{S}\in[0,\infty)$
- Gamma distribution
  - Specified mean $\mathbb{E}(X)$ and log mean $\mathbb{E}(\log X)$ over the support set $\mathcal{S}\in[0,\infty)$
  - The exponential distribution is a special case
- Normal distribution
  - Specified mean $\mathbb{E}(X)$ and variance $\text{Var}(X)$ over the support set $\mathcal{S}\in(-\infty,\infty)$
  - If we have a specified mean and variance on the log scale, then the lognormal distribution is the maximum entropy distribution

=== CBA under US administrations ===
The increased use of CBA in the US regulatory process is often associated with President Ronald Reagan's administration. Although CBA in US policy-making dates back several decades, Reagan's Executive Order 12291 mandated its use in the regulatory process. After campaigning on a deregulation platform, he issued the 1981 EO authorizing the Office of Information and Regulatory Affairs (OIRA) to review agency regulations and requiring federal agencies to produce regulatory impact analyses when the estimated annual impact exceeded $100 million. During the 1980s, academic and institutional critiques of CBA emerged. The three main criticisms were:

1. That CBA could be used for political goals. Debates on the merits of cost and benefit comparisons can be used to sidestep political or philosophical goals, rules and regulations.
2. That CBA is inherently anti-regulatory, and therefore a biased tool. The monetization of policy impacts is an inappropriate tool for assessing mortality risks and distributional impacts.
3. That the length of time necessary to complete CBA can create significant delays, which can impede policy regulation.

These criticisms continued under the Clinton administration during the 1990s. Clinton furthered the anti-regulatory environment with his Executive Order 12866. The order changed some of Reagan's language, requiring benefits to justify (rather than exceeding) costs and adding "reduction of discrimination or bias" as a benefit to be analyzed. Criticisms of CBA (including uncertainty valuations, discounting future values, and the calculation of risk) were used to argue that it should play no part in the regulatory process. The use of CBA in the regulatory process continued under the Obama administration, along with the debate about its practical and objective value. Some analysts oppose the use of CBA in policy-making, and those in favor of it support improvements in analysis and calculations.

== Criticisms ==
As a concept in economics, cost–benefit analysis has provided a valuable reference for many public construction and governmental decisions, but its application has gradually revealed a number of drawbacks and limitations. A number of critical arguments have been put forward in response. That include concerns about measuring the distribution of costs and benefits, discounting the costs and benefits to future generations, and accounting for the diminishing marginal utility of income. In addition, relying solely on cost–benefit analysis may lead to neglecting the multifaceted value factors of a project.

=== Distribution ===
CBA has been criticized in some disciplines as it relies on the Kaldor–Hicks criterion which does not take into account distributional issues. This means, that positive net-benefits are decisive, independent of who benefits and who loses when a certain policy or project is put into place. As a result, CBA can overlook concerns of equity and fairness, potentially favoring policies that disproportionately benefit certain groups while imposing burdens on others. Phaneuf and Requate phrased it as follows "CBA today relies on the Kaldor–Hicks criteria to make statements about efficiency without addressing issues of income distribution. This has allowed economists to stay silent on issues of equity, while focusing on the more familiar task of measuring costs and benefits". The challenge raised is that it is possible for the benefits of successive policies to consistently accrue to the same group of individuals, and CBA is ambivalent between providing benefits to those that have received them in the past and those that have been consistently excluded.

=== Discounting and future generations ===
Others have critiqued the practice of discounting future costs and benefits for a variety of reasons, including the potential undervaluing of the temporally distant cost of climate change and other environmental damage, and the concern that such a practice effectively ignores the preferences of future generations. Some scholars argue that the use of discounting makes CBA biased against future generations, and understates the potential harmful impacts of climate change. The growing relevance of climate change has led to a re-examination of the practice of discounting in CBA. These biases can lead to biased resource allocation.

=== Marginal utility ===
The main criticism stems from the diminishing marginal utility of income. According to this critique, without using weights in the CBA, it is not the case that everyone "matters" the same but rather that people with greater ability to pay receive a higher weight. One reason for this is that for high income people, one monetary unit is worth less relative to low income people, so they are more willing to give up one unit in order to make a change that is favourable for them. This means that there is no symmetry in agents, i.e. some people benefit more from the same absolute monetary benefit. Any welfare change, no matter positive or negative, affects people with a lower income stronger than people with a higher income, even if the exact monetary impacts are identical. This is more than just a challenge to the distribution of benefits in CBA, it is a critique of the ability of CBA to accurately measure benefits as, according to this critique, using unweighted absolute willingness to pay overstates the costs and benefits to the wealthy, and understates those costs and benefits to the poor. Sometimes this is framed in terms of an argument about democracy, that each person's preferences should be given the same weight in an analysis (one person one vote), while under a standard CBA model the preferences of the wealthy are given greater weight.

Taken together, according to this objection, not using weights is a decision in itself – richer people receive de facto a bigger weight. To compensate for this difference in valuation, it is possible to use different methods. One is to use weights, and there are a number of different approaches for calculating these weights. Often, a Bergson-Samuelson social welfare function is used and weights are calculated according to the willingness-to-pay of people. Another method is to use percentage willingness to pay, where willingness to pay is measured as a percentage of total income or wealth to control for income. These methods would also help to address distributional concerns raised by the Kaldor-Hick criterion.

=== Limitations in the scope of assessment ===
Economic cost–benefit analysis tends to limit the assessment of benefits to economic values, ignoring the importance of other value factors such as the wishes of minority groups, inclusiveness and respect for the rights of others. These value factors are difficult to rank and measure in terms of weighting, yet cost–benefit analysis suffers from the inability to consider these factors comprehensively, thus lacking the integrity and comprehensiveness of social welfare judgements. Therefore, for projects with a higher standard of evaluation, other evaluation methods need to be used and referred to in order to compensate for these shortcomings and to assess the impact of the project on society in a more comprehensive and integrated manner.

== See also ==
- Balance sheet
- Business case – Document providing reasoning for a project
- Calculus of negligence – Process for identifying breach of duty of care
- Downside risk – Risk of the actual return being below the expected return
- Economic forecasting – Process of making predictions about the economy
- Efficient contract theory – Hypothesis in microeconomics
- Guns versus butter model – Macroeconomic relationship between defense spending and civilian welfare
- Have one's cake and eat it too – English idiomatic proverb
- Law and economics – Analysis of law using economic theory
- Opportunity cost – Benefit lost by a choice between options
- Return on time invested
- Scarcity – Concept in economics
- Shadow price – Term in economics
- Social impact assessment – Reviews infrastructure and development
- Statistical murder
- Tax choice – Participatory tax allocation process
- There ain't no such thing as a free lunch – Adage of the impossibility of getting something for nothing
- Trade-off – Situational decision
- Triple bottom line cost–benefit analysis
- True cost accounting – Accounting that measures the hidden impacts of economic activities on the environment
- Uncertainty quantification – Science of characterizing uncertainties
- Shadow wage
