= AIDS education and training centers =

A red ribbon is often used to signify the fight against AIDS

AIDS, caused by the human immunodeficiency virus (HIV), has become a global health issue, and various ways are being explored in order to combat the spread of the disease. One such way to somewhat limit the spread of AIDS is through education. Societies with significant number of HIV positive individuals and people that have been diagnosed with having cases of AIDS are societies in which education about the disease is limited to almost non-existent and where culture and tradition clash with modern medicine. Thus, education and training are of great importance and a number of organizations have been formed within the past two decades. Organizations vary from being government funded to private and/or are formed by health and social advocates. Organizations provide range of services from support for families and individuals affected by the disease, classes in academic settings ranging from preschools to universities, available resources to updates on the latest advances in medical treatments.

In many societies, even in many Western cultures, stereotyping exists and one way to stop or prevent discrimination is through education and passing out information about the ways the disease is spread. Big problem in containing the spread of the disease are cultural and religious backgrounds where usage of common contraceptives, such as latex condoms, are prohibited. Unfortunate events such as wars and armed conflicts often employ rape as a mean of terrorizing local population, in which AIDS, among other sexually transmitted diseases (STDs), is spread almost exponentially and, very often, it is impossible to trace back to the individual that was the original HIV carrier. The consequences of such horrific acts are infected mothers who give births to infected babies and the disease is spread vertically. Because of its impact on global population and the high rate of spreading, AIDS has been classified as being pandemic.

There is a growing number of organizations exclusively dedicated to AIDS education and prevention, as well as organized training of medical staff and any individuals that may be interested. Main goals of these organizations are:

- Education about the disease (acquisition and transmission process)
- Training
- Support
- Updates on latest research efforts

== See also ==
- The Global Fund to Fight AIDS, Tuberculosis and Malaria
