= Communist Party of India (Marxist) – West Bengal =

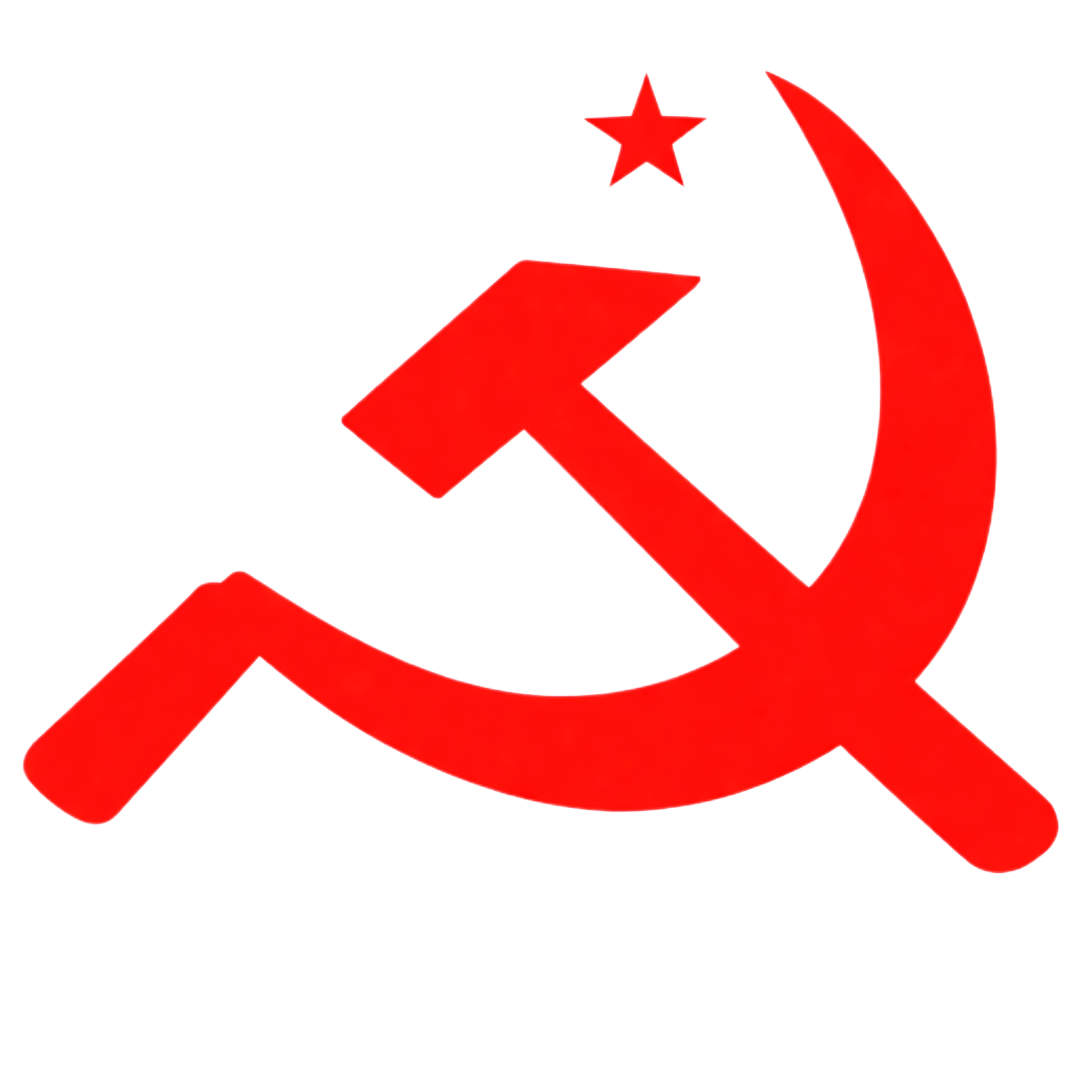
- Abbreviation: CPI(M) WB
- General Secretary: Md. Salim
- Governing body: Polit Bureau
- Founded: 7 November 1964 (62 years ago)
- Split from: Communist Party of India, West Bengal
- Headquarters: Alimuddin Street, Kolkata, West Bengal
- Newspaper: Ganashakti
- Student wing: Students' Federation of India
- Youth wing: Democratic Youth Federation of India
- Women's wing: All India Democratic Women's Association
- Membership (2021): ▼160,827
- Ideology: Communism; Marxism-Leninism
- Political position: Left-wing
- National affiliation: Indian National Developmental Inclusive Alliance
- Regional affiliation: Left Front
- International affiliation: IMCWP
- Colors: Red
- Slogan: লাল সেলাম ("Lal salam") ইনকিলাব জিন্দাবাদ ("Inquilab Zindabad")
- Anthem: "The Internationale"
- Lok Sabha: 0 / 42
- Rajya Sabha: 0 / 16
- West Bengal Legislative Assembly: 1 / 294
- Gorkhaland Territorial Administration: 0 / 50
- Gram Panchayats: 3,242 / 63,229
- Panchayat Samitis: 196 / 9,730
- Zilla Parishads: 2 / 928
- Municipalities: 1 / 108

Election symbol
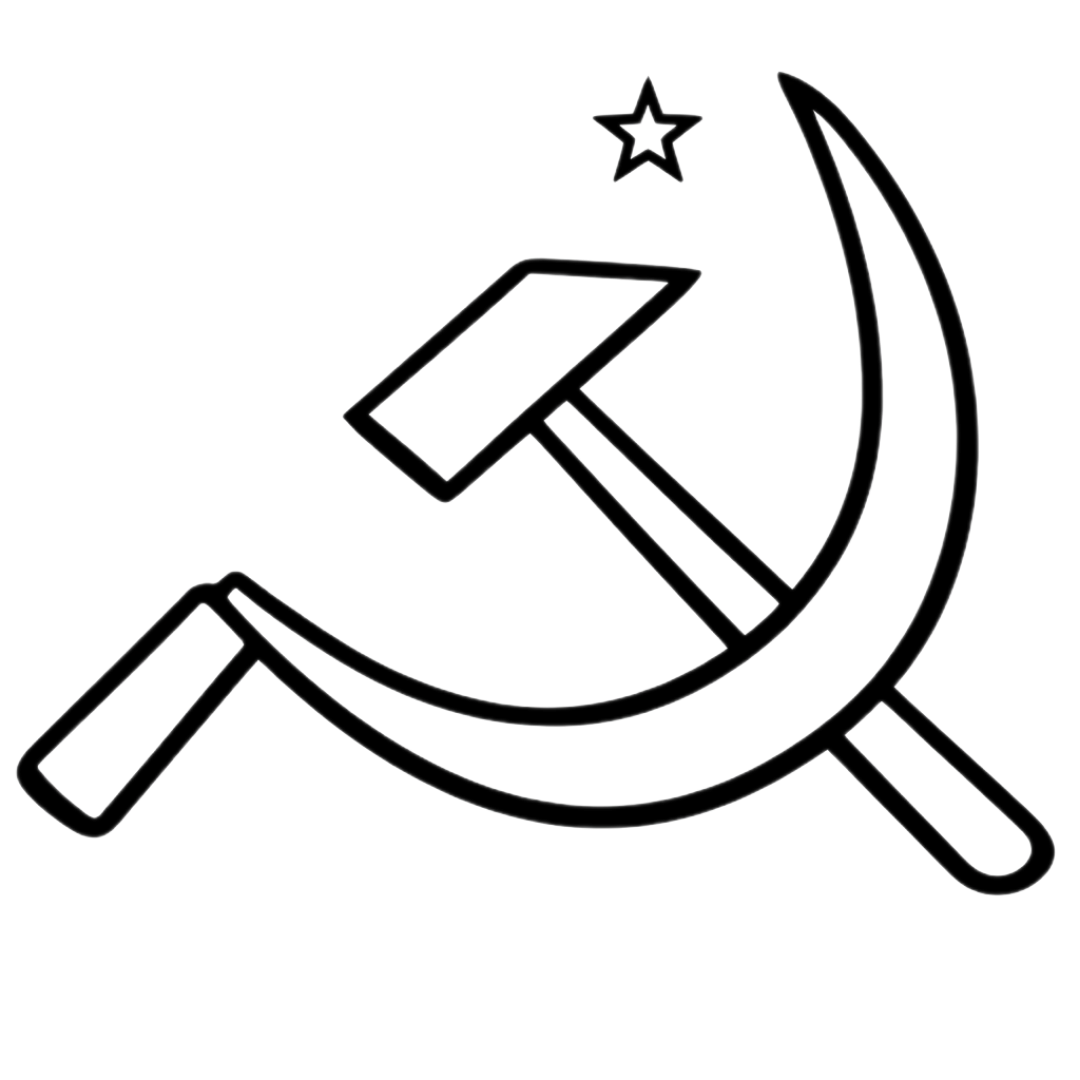

Party flag

Website
- cpimwestbengal.org cpimwb.org.in

The Communist Party of India (Marxist) of West Bengal is the West Bengal affiliate of the Communist Party of India (Marxist) in India. The party was the leader of the longest-serving governing alliance, Left Front, in West Bengal, holding power from 1977 to 2011. Currently, the party holds one representative in West Bengal Legislative Assembly.

== History ==
=== Formation of CPI(M) ===
In the following period the Communist Party underwent a vertical a split in the Communist Party of India in 1964 with a section of the party including Muzaffar Ahmad, Jyoti Basu, Promode Dasgupta and Hare Krishna Konar going on to form the Communist Party of India (Marxist). There were several ongoing ideological conflicts between sections within the Communist Party about the nature of the Indian State and the characterisation and method of interaction with the Indian National Congress, about the approach towards the ongoing debate between the Soviet Union and China and with regards to the handling of the border disputes between India and China.

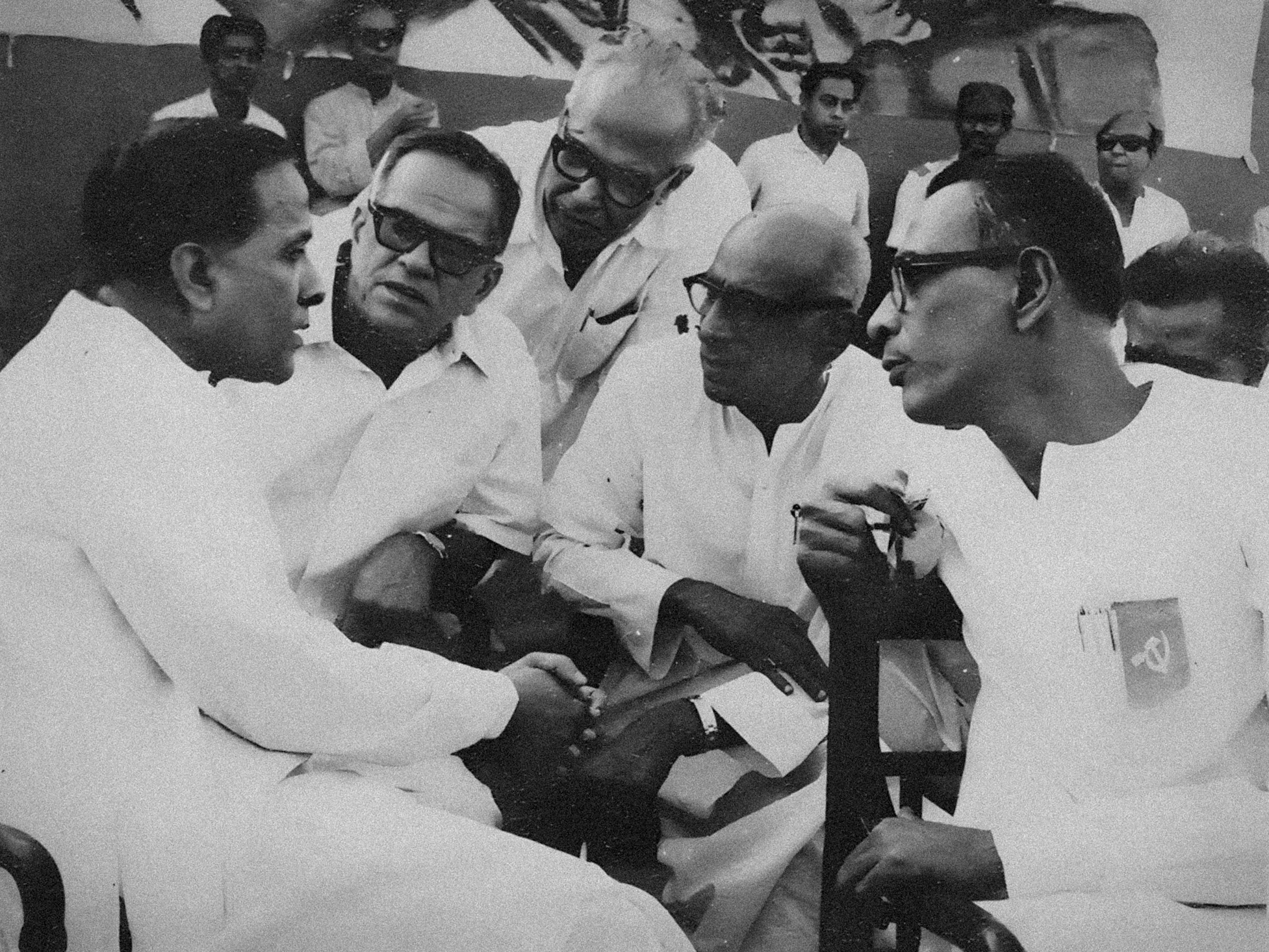
Basu, Ranadive, Mukherjee, Basavapunnaiah, and Konar in the conference of AIKS held in Barsul, West Bengal in 1969

These debates were further exacerbated by the food movement in West Bengal and brought to the forefront by the rising border tensions between India and China. The Communist Party had also become the second largest party in the Lok Sabha following the 1962 Indian general election with nearly 10% vote share which is described to have brought prominence to the internal divisions of the party.

In the West Bengal Legislative Assembly election of 1967, fourteen opposition parties contested through two pre-poll political alliances; the CPI-M led United Left Front and the CPI and Bangla Congress (splinter of the Congress party formed in 1966) led People's United Left Front. The CPI-M became the second largest party outstripping its former party, the CPI.

=== Basu Era (1977–2000) ===
For the 1977 West Bengal Legislative Assembly election, negotiations between the Janata Party and the Communist Party of India (Marxist) broke down. This led to a three sided contest between the Indian National Congress, the Janata Party and the Communist Party of India (Marxist) led Left Front coalition. The results of the election was a surprising sweep for the Left Front winning 230 seats out of 290 with the CPI-M winning an absolute majority on its own, Jyoti Basu became the chief minister of West Bengal.

Jyoti Basu, during the inaugural ceremony of Science City, Kolkata

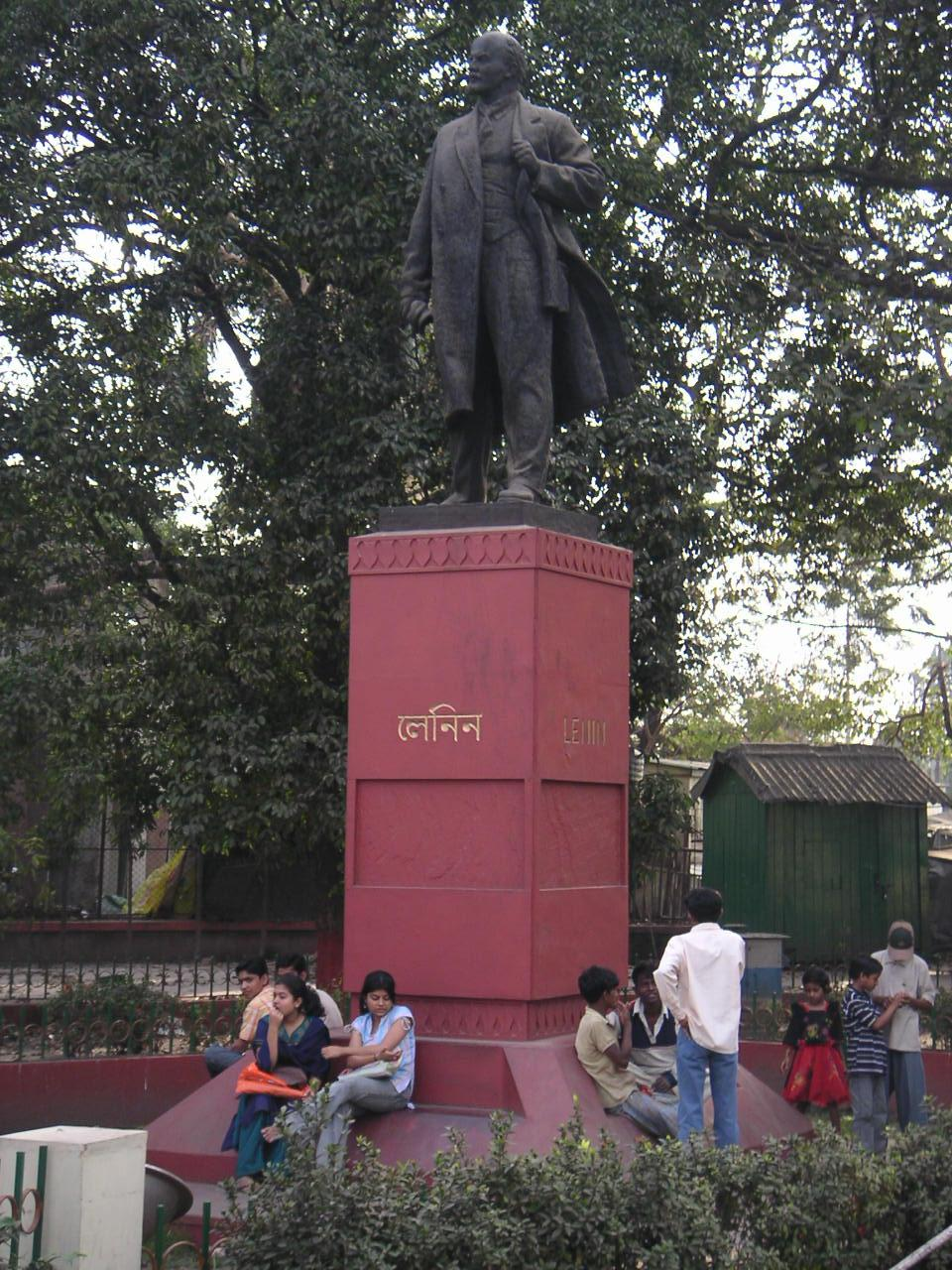
Vladimir Lenin statue in Kolkata

The state saw rapid developments in this period, with the Land Reforms and the Panchayat System being two of the many notable ones. In this time, the state had become one of the leaders in agricultural output, being the leading producer of rice and the second leading producer of potatoes. In the first term of the coming to power, the Left Front government under Basu initiated a number of agrarian and institutional reforms which resulted in reduction of poverty rates, an exponential rise in agricultural production and decrease in political polarisation. It also enabled the large scale adoption of technological advancements which had earlier been brought in through the Green Revolution in India in the 1960s. The agricultural growth jumped from an annual average of 0.6% between 1970–1980 to over 7% between 1980–1990 and the state was described as an agricultural success story of the 1980s. During this period, the state of West Bengal moved from being a food importer to a food exporter and became the largest producer of rice outstripping the states of Andhra Pradesh and Punjab which had previously held the status. The Human Development Index was also noted to have improved at a much faster rate than in other states, growing from being the lowest in the country in 1975 to above the national average in 1990.

=== Buddhadeb Era (2000–2011) ===
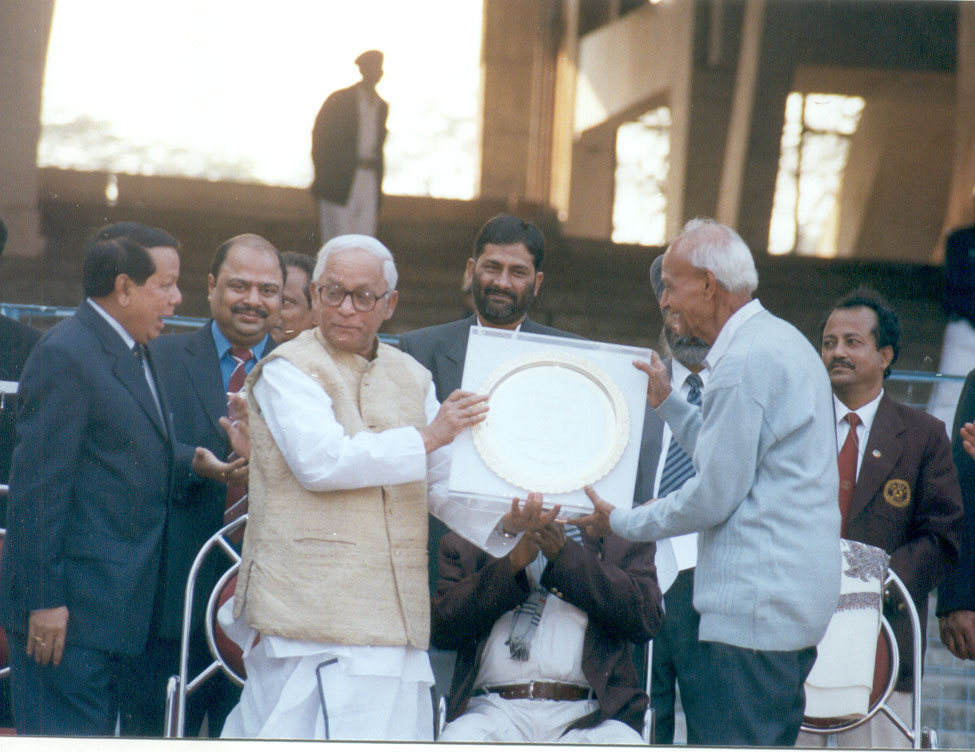
The Chief Minister of West Bengal Shri Buddhadev Bhattacharya felicitating legendary footballer Shri Sailen Manna during the inauguration of the ONGC Cup 10th National Football League Tournament at Yuba Bharati Krirangan in

In 2000, Jyoti Basu resigned as the chief minister. He was succeeded by Buddhadeb Bhattacharjee. Unlike other orthodox leaders, Buddhadeb was more open to market and technological reforms. He attempted to industrialize West Bengal by bringing a Tata motors plant in Singur but this erupted a huge controversy. Buddhadeb's government requested farmers to give the land, which sparked huge protests. Later Tata Group ultimately backed out of the project. There was also violence in Nandigram as well, in which many protesters died due to police firing.

Violence, economic stagnation, the surge of Mamata Banerjee and her TMC led to the decline of support of Buddhadeb and the CPI(M), even among the core voters like peasants and workers. A demand for change started, which eventually led to the fall of the 34-years long Left Front government in 2011.

== Structure and composition ==
=== State Conferences ===
==== As Communist Party of India ====
No	Location	Year	Secretary Elected
1st	Metiaburuz	1934	Mani Chattopadhyay
2nd	Chandannagar	1938	Nripen Chakraborty
3rd	Bharat Sabha Hall,Kolkata	18–21 March, 1943	Bhabani Sen
4th	Dacres Lane, Kolkata	4–6 October, 1948	Ranen Sen
5th	Muslim Institute Hall, Kolkata	5–9 October, 1951	Muzzaffar Ahmed
6th	Muslim Institute Hall, Kolkata	17–21 December, 1953	Jyoti Basu
7th	Muslim Institute Hall, Kolkata	16–21 January, 1956	Jyoti Basu
8th	Muslim Institute Hall, Kolkata	8–12 April, 1959	Jyoti Basu
9th	Burdwan	17–22 January, 1961	Promode Dasgupta
10th	Muslim Institute Hall, Kolkata	22–26 October, 1964	Promode Dasgupta

==== As Communist Party of India (Marxist) ====
No	Location	Year	Secretary Elected
11th	Dum Dum	6–9 October, 1968	Promode Dasgupta
13th	Sisir Mancha, Kolkata	7–10 February, 1978	Promode Dasgupta
14th	Mahajati Sadan, Kolkata	27 December–3 January, 1981–82	Promode Dasgupta
15th	Tollygunge	29 November–2 December, 1985	Saroj Mukherjee
16th	Yuva Bharati Krirangan, Salt Lake	3–6 December, 1988	Saroj Mukherjee
17th	Siliguri	11–15 December, 1991	Sailen Dasgupta
18th	Kishore Bharati Krirangan, Jadavpur	1–5 March, 1995	Sailen Dasgupta
19th	Sarat Sadan, Howrah	27–30 August, 1998	Sailen Dasgupta
20th	Promode Dasgupta Bhaban, Kolkata	22–25 February, 2002	Anil Biswas
21st	Nazrul Mancha, Kamarhati	9–12 February, 2005	Anil Biswas
22nd	Mahajati Sadan, Kolkata	13–17 January, 2008	Biman Bose
23rd	Promode Dasgupta Bhaban, Kolkata	15–19 February, 2012	Biman Bose
24th	Pramode Dasgupta Bhaban, Kolkata	8–13 March, 2015	Surjya Kanta Mishra
25th	Pramode Dasgupta Bhaban, Kolkata	5–8 March, 2018	Surjya Kanta Mishra
26th	Pramode Dasgupta Bhaban, Kolkata	14–16 March, 2022	Mohammed Salim
27th	Dankuni, Hooghly District	22–25 February, 2025	Mohammed Salim

=== List of state secretaries ===
No	Portrait	Secretary	Term	Total years as secretary
1		Promode Dasgupta	1964 - 1982	18 Years
2		Saroj Mukherjee	1982 - 1990	8 Years
3		Sailen Dasgupta	1991 – 1998	7 Years
4		Anil Biswas	1998 - 2006	8 Years
5		Biman Bose	2006 - 2015	9 Years
6		Surjya Kanta Mishra	2015 - 2022	7 Years
7		Mohammed Salim	2022–present	4 years, 249 days

=== Current state committee members ===
No	Name
1	Mohammed Salim (Secretary)
2	Ram Chandra Dome
3	Sridip Bhattacharya
4	Sujan Chakraborty
5	Abhas Ray Choudhuri
6	Sumit De
7	Samik Lahiri
8	Deblina Hembram
9	Anadi Sahoo
10	Kallol Majumder
11	Palash Das
12	Debabrata Ghosh
13	Ziaul Alam
14	Debasish Chakraborty
15	Pulin Bihari Baske
16	Saman Pathak
17	Anwarul Haque
18	Goutam Ghosh
19	Shyamali Pradhan
29	Alakesh Das
21	Minakshi Mukherjee
22	Pradip Sarkar
23	Shaikh Ibrahim
24	Shatarup Ghosh
25	Srijan Bhattacharyya
26	Amiya Patra
27	Ram Chandra Dome
28	Abhas Roy Choudhury
29	Anadi Sahoo
30	Kallol Majumdar
31	Sumit De
32	Palash Das
33	Amal Halder
34	Sukhendu Panigrahi
35	Jibesh Sarkar
36	Debasish Chakrabarty
37	Rama Biswas
38	Achintya Mallick

=== District Committees ===
District	District Secretary
Cooch Behar	Ananta Ray
Alipurduar	Kishore Das
Jalpaiguri	Piyush Mishra
Darjeeling	Saman Pathak
Uttar Dinajpur	Anwarul Haque
Dakshin Dinajpur	Nandalal Hazra
Maldah	Kaushik Mishra
Murshidabad	Jamir Mollah
Nadia	Meghlal Sekh
North 24 Parganas	Palash Das
South 24 Parganas	Ratan Bagchi
Kolkata	Kallol Mazumdar
Howrah	Dilip Ghosh
Hooghly	Debabrata Ghosh
Purba Medinipur	Niranjan Sihi
Paschim Medinipur	Bijay Paul
Jhargram	Pradip Sarkar
Purulia	Pradip Ray
Bankura	Deblina Hembram
Purba Bardhaman	Syed Hossain
Paschim Bardhaman	Gouranga Chatterjee
Birbhum	Goutam Ghosh

== List of Chief Minister's from CPI(M) in West Bengal ==
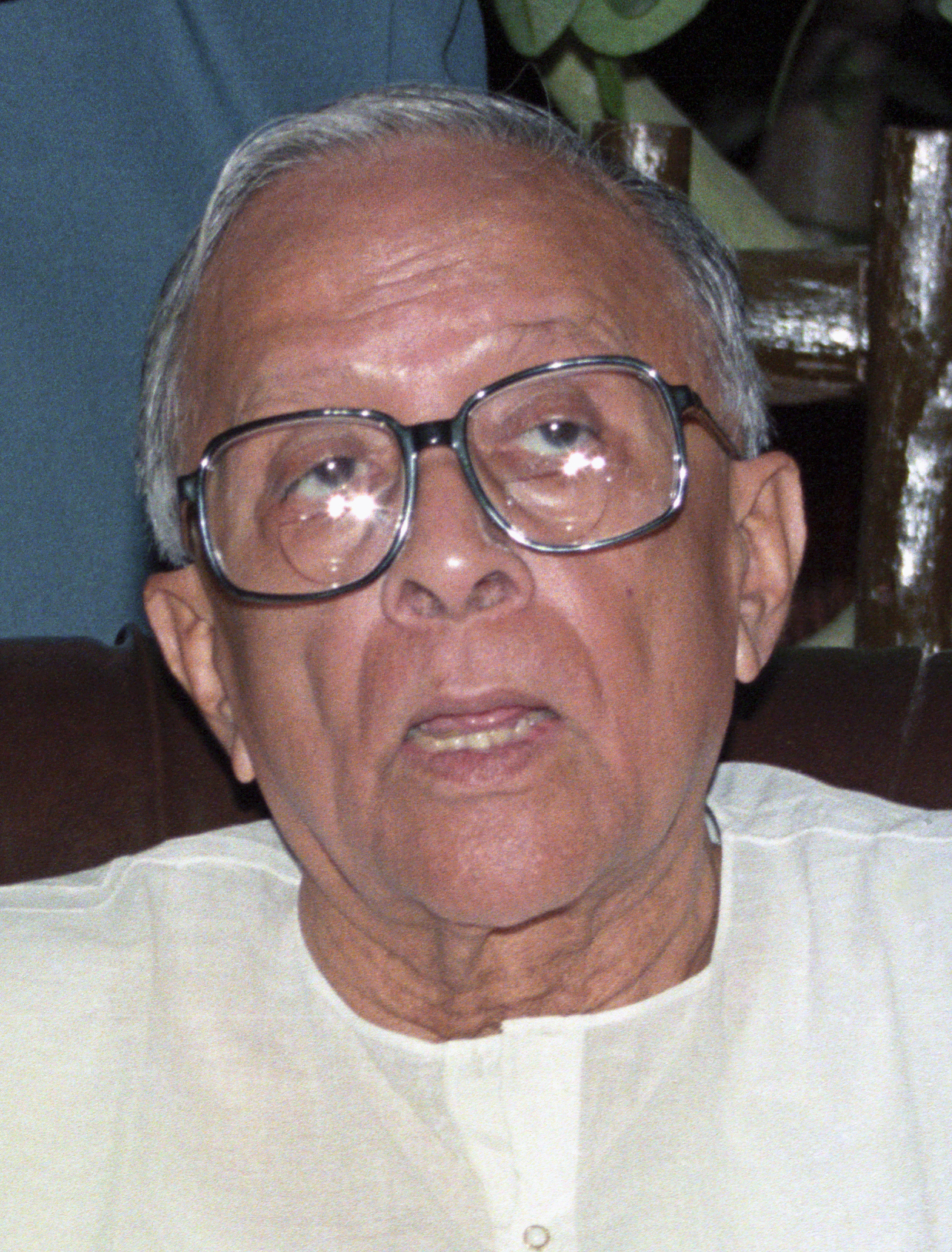
Jyoti Basu, longest serving chief minister of West Bengal

No.	Name	Portrait	Term of office		Days in office
1	Jyoti Basu		21 June 1977	23 May 1982	23 years 137 days
1	Jyoti Basu		24 May 1982	29 March 1987	23 years 137 days
1	Jyoti Basu		30 March 1987	18 June 1991	23 years 137 days
1	Jyoti Basu		19 June 1991	15 May 1996	23 years 137 days
1	Jyoti Basu		16 May 1996	5 November 2000	23 years 137 days
2	Buddhadeb Bhattacharya		6 November 2000	14 May 2001	10 years 188 days
2	Buddhadeb Bhattacharya		15 May 2001	17 May 2006	10 years 188 days
2	Buddhadeb Bhattacharya		18 May 2006	13 May 2011	10 years 188 days

== Results in West Bengal State Assembly elections ==
Election Year	Party leader	Overall votes	% of overall votes	Total seats	seats won/ seats contensted	+/- in seats	+/- in vote share	Sitting side
As Communist Party of India (Marxist)
1967	Jyoti Basu	2,293,026	18.11%	280	43 / 135	new	new	Opposition
1969	Jyoti Basu	2,676,981	20.00%	280	80 / 190	▲37	▲1.9%	Opposition
1971	Jyoti Basu	N/A	27.45%	294	113 / 200	▲33	N/A	Opposition
1972	Jyoti Basu	5,080,828	27.45%	294	14 / 209	▼99	N/A	Opposition
1977	Jyoti Basu	5,080,828	35.46%	294	178 / 224	▲164	▲8.01	Government
1982	Jyoti Basu	8,655,371	38.49%	294	174 / 209	▼4	▲3.03	Government
1987	Jyoti Basu	10,285,723	39.12%	294	187 / 212	▲13	▲0.89	Government
1991	Jyoti Basu	11,418,822	36.87%	294	182 / 204	▲2	▼2.43	Government
1996	Jyoti Basu	13,670,198	37.16%	294	153 / 213	▼32	▲1.05	Government
2001	Buddhadeb Bhattacharya	13,402,603	36.59%	294	143 / 211	▼14	▼1.33	Government
2006	Buddhadeb Bhattacharya	14,652,200	37.13%	294	176 / 212	▲33	▲0.54	Government
2011	Buddhadeb Bhattacharya	14,330,061	30.08%	294	40 / 213	▼136	▼7.05	Opposition
2016	Surjya Kanta Mishra	10,802,058	19.75%	294	26 / 148	▼14	▼10.35	Opposition
2021	Surjya Kanta Mishra	2,837,276	4.73%	294	0 / 136	▼26	▼15.02	Lost
2026	Mohammed Salim	2,839,067	4.45%	294	1 / 197	▲1	▼0.28	Opposition

== Results of Indian general elections in West Bengal ==
Election Year	Overall Votes	% of overall votes	Total seats	Seats won/ Seats contested	+/- in seats	+/- in vote share
As Communist Party of India (Marxist)
1967	2,012,522	15.6 %	40	5 / 16	New	New
1971	4,485,105	34.3 %	40	20 / 38	▲15	▲18.7
1977	3,839,091	26.1 %	42	17 / 20	▼3	▼8.2%
1980	8,199,926	39.9 %	42	28 / 31	▲11	▲13.8%
1984	9,119,546	35.9 %	42	18 / 31	▼10	▼4%
1989	12,150,017	38.4 %	42	27 / 31	▲9	▲2.5%
1991	10,934,583	35.2 %	42	27 / 30	Steady	▼3.2%
1996	13,467,522	36.7 %	42	23 / 31	▼4	▲1.5%
1998	12,931,639	35.4 %	42	24 / 32	▲1	▼1.3%
1999	12,553,991	35.6 %	42	21 / 32	▼3	▲0.2%
2004	14,271,042	38.6%	42	26 / 32	▲5	▲3.0%
2009	14,144,667	33.1 %	42	9 / 32	▼17	▼5.5%
2014	11,720,997	23.0%	42	2 / 32	▼7	▼10.1%
2019	3,594,283	6.3 %	42	0 / 31	▼2	▼16.7%
2024	3,416,941	5.7 %	42	0 / 23	Steady	▼0.6%

== CPI(M) in West Bengal Municipal Corporations ==
Corporation	Election Year	Seats won/ Total seats	Per. of votes	Sitting side
Asansol Municipal Corporation	2022	2 / 106	1.89%	Opposition
Bidhannagar Municipal Corporation	2022	0 / 41	10.95%	—N/a
Chandernagore Municipal Corporation	2022	2 / 33	26.40%	Opposition
Howrah Municipal Corporation	2013	2 / 66	N/A	Opposition
Kolkata Municipal Corporation	2021	1 / 144	9.65%	Opposition
Siliguri Municipal Corporation	2022	4 / 47	14.41%	Opposition

== CPI(M) in West Bengal Local Elections ==
Election Year	Gram Panchayats won	Panchayat Samitis	Zilla Parishads	Per. of votes
2018	1,483 / 63,229	110 / 9,730	1 / 928	6%
2023	3,242 / 63,229	196 / 9,730	2 / 928	14%

== See also ==
- Left Front (West Bengal)
- Communist Party of India (Marxist), Kerala
- Communist Party of India (Marxist), Tripura
- Communist Party of India (Marxist), Tamil Nadu
