= Politburo of the Communist Party of India (Marxist) =

Highest body of the Communist Party of India (Marxist)

Overview
- Type: Executive Authority
- Elected by: Central Committee which is elected in the Party Congress
- Length of term: Three years

History
- Established: by 7th Party Congress on 7 November 1964; 61 years ago

Leadership
- General Secretary: M. A. Baby
- Executive organ: Central Secretariat

Members
- Total: 18

Elections
- Last election: 6 April 2025

Meeting place
- A.K. Gopalan Bhawan, New Delhi

The Politburo, also known as the Political Bureau, is the highest executive authority of the Communist Party of India (Marxist) (CPI(M)). Its members are elected by the Central Committee, which is in turn elected at the Party Congress, typically convened every three years.

== History ==
Many a time in the history of the Politburo, it has experienced periods of dissent and ideological tensions.

For instance, E. M. S. Namboodiripad, a co-founder of CPI(M), general secretary from 1978 to 1992 and member of the Politburo from 1964 to 1998, conducted some expulsions within the Central Committee, to combat those engaging in revisionism as well as those affected by supposed "bourgeois parliamentary mentality".

== Functions and composition ==
=== Elections ===
The All-India Party Congress, typically convened every three years, serves as the supreme authority of the CPI(M). Between sessions of the Party Congress, the Central Committee functions as the highest decision-making body. The Central Committee elects a Politburo from among its members, including the General Secretary, who is the party's principal leader.

=== Functions ===
The Politburo functions as the executive body responsible for carrying out the work of the Central Committee between its sessions. It has the authority to make political and organisational decisions in the period between two meetings of the Central Committee. Additionally, the Politburo oversees the Central Secretariat, which manages the party's day-to-day operations and assists in the implementation of decisions taken by the Central Committee.

== Current Politburo Members ==
The 24th Politburo was elected at the 24th Party Congress, held in Madurai, Tamil Nadu, from 2 to 6 April 2025. M. A. Baby was elected as general secretary of CPI(M). Jitendra Chaudhury became the first-ever Adivasi member of the Politburo. The 24th Politburo saw eight new members introduced, with six members stepping down.

Portrait	Name	Note
	M. A. Baby	General Secretary; Member of Central Secretariat; Former Minister for Education and Culture in Kerala; Former Member of Parliament, Rajya Sabha
	B. V. Raghavulu	Member of Central Secretariat; Former Andhra Pradesh State Secretary
	Pinarayi Vijayan	Member of Kerala State Secretariat; Former Chief Minister of Kerala; Leader of the opposition in the Kerala Legislative Assembly
	Tapan Sen	Former CITU General Secretary; CITU Vice President; Former Member of Parliament, Rajya Sabha
	Nilotpal Basu	Former SFI General Secretary; Former Member of Parliament, Rajya Sabha
	A. Vijayaraghavan	AIAWU President; Former LDF Convenor; Former Member of Parliament, Lok Sabha; Former Member of Parliament, Rajya Sabha
	Mohammed Salim	West Bengal State Secretary; Former Member of Parliament, Rajya Sabha; Former Minister for Technical Education and Training, Youth Welfare, Minority Development and Welfare, Self Employment in West Bengal; Former Member of Parliament, Lok Sabha
	Ashok Dhawale	AIKS President; Former Maharashtra State Secretary
	Ram Chandra Dome	Member of West Bengal State Secretariat; Former Member of Parliament, Lok Sabha
	M. V. Govindan	Kerala State Secretary; Member of Legislative Assembly, Kerala; Former Minister for Local Self Governments and Excise in Kerala
	Jitendra Choudhury	Tripura State Secretary; Leader of Opposition in Tripura Legislative Assembly; Former Minister of Forest and Industry, Commerce, Sports in Tripura; Former Member of Parliament, Lok Sabha
	K. Balakrishnan	Former Tamil Nadu State Secretary; Former Member of Legislative Assembly, Tamil Nadu
	U. Vasuki	AIDWA Vice President
	Amra Ram	AIKS Vice President; Member of Parliament, Lok Sabha; Former Member of Legislative Assembly, Rajasthan
	Srideep Bhattacharya	Member of West Bengal State Secretariat
	Vijoo Krishnan	AIKS General Secretary
	Mariam Dhawale	Former AIDWA General Secretary
	R. Arun Kumar	Former SFI President

== List of Party Congresses ==
Congress	Date	Location	Elected Secretary	Ref.
24th	2 – 6 April 2025	Madurai, Tamil Nadu	M. A. Baby	
23rd	6 – 10 April 2022	Kannur, Kerala	Sitaram Yechury	
22nd	18 – 22 April 2018	Hyderabad, Telangana	Sitaram Yechury	
21st	April 2015	Visakhapatnam, Andhra Pradesh	Sitaram Yechury	
20th	April 2012	Calicut, Kerala	Prakash Karat	
19th	29 March – 3 April 2008	Coimbatore, Tamil Nadu	Prakash Karat	
18th	6 – 11 April 2005	New Delhi, Delhi	Prakash Karat	
17th	19 – 24 March 2002	Hyderabad, Andhra Pradesh	Harkishan Singh Surjeet	
16th	5 – 11 October 1998	Calcutta, West Bengal	Harkishan Singh Surjeet	
15th	3 – 8 April 1995	Chandigarh, Punjab	Harkishan Singh Surjeet	
14th	3 – 9 January 1992	Madras, Tamil Nadu	Harkishan Singh Surjeet	
13th	27 December 1988 – 1 January 1989	Trivandrum, Kerala	E. M. S. Namboodiripad	
12th	25 – 29 December 1985	Calcutta, West Bengal	E. M. S. Namboodiripad	
11th	26 – 31 January 1982	Vijayawada, Andhra Pradesh	E. M. S. Namboodiripad	
10th	2 – 8 April 1978	Jalandar, Punjab	E. M. S. Namboodiripad	
9th	27 June – 2 July 1972	Madurai, Tamil Nadu	Puchalapalli Sundarayya	
8th	23 – 29 December 1968	Cochin, Kerala	Puchalapalli Sundarayya	
7th	31 October – 7 November 1964	Calcutta, West Bengal	Puchalapalli Sundarayya	

== List of Past Politburo Members ==
=== 23rd Politburo ===
23rd Party Congress
Date: 6 – 10 April 2022
Venue: Kannur, Kerala

A 17-member Politburo was elected by the Central Committee with Sitaram Yechury as the General Secretary for the third consecutive time. Ram Chandra Dome became the first Dalit leader to be inducted into the Politburo, marking a historic milestone.

- Sitaram Yechury, General Secretary (died on 12 September 2024)
- Prakash Karat (Interim Coordinator from 29 September 2024)
- Pinarayi Vijayan
- Brinda Karat
- Manik Sarkar
- Kodiyeri Balakrishnan (died on 1 October 2022)
- M. A. Baby
- Surjya Kanta Mishra
- Mohammed Salim
- Subhashini Ali
- B. V. Raghavulu
- G. Ramakrishnan
- Tapan Kumar Sen
- Nilotpal Basu
- Ram Chandra Dome
- A. Vijayaraghavan
- Ashok Dhawale
- M.V. Govindan (inducted on 31 October 2022)

=== 22nd Politburo ===
The 22nd Congress of the CPI(M) held between 18 and 22 April 2018 at Hyderabad, Telangana elected a 95-member Central Committee. There were also six special invitees and two permanent invitees to the Central Committee. The Central Committee at its meeting held on 22 April 2018 at the conclusion of the Congress elected a 17-member Politburo. The C.C. also re-elected Com. Sitaram Yechury as the General Secretary.

- Sitaram Yechury, General Secretary
- Prakash Karat
- S. Ramachandran Pillai
- Biman Bose
- Manik Sarkar
- Brinda Karat
- Pinarayi Vijayan
- Hannan Mollah
- Kodiyeri Balakrishnan
- M. A. Baby
- Surjya Kanta Mishra
- Mohammed Salim
- Subhashini Ali
- B. V. Raghavulu
- G. Ramakrishnan
- Tapan Kumar Sen
- Nilotpal Basu

=== 21st Politburo ===
The 21st Politburo was elected at the 21st party congress of CPI(M), held in Visakhapatnam in April 2015.

- Sitaram Yechury, General Secretary
- Subhashini Ali
- M. A. Baby
- Kodiyeri Balakrishnan
- Biman Bose
- Surja Kanta Mishra
- Prakash Karat
- A. K. Padmanabhan
- B. V. Raghavulu
- S. Ramachandran Pillai
- G.Ramakrishnan
- Mohammed Salim
- Manik Sarkar
- Pinarayi Vijayan
- Brinda Karat
- Hannan Mollah

=== 20th Politburo ===
The 20th Politburo was elected at the 20th party congress of CPI(M), held in Calicut in April 2012.

- Prakash Karat, General Secretary
- M. A. Baby
- Kodiyeri Balakrishnan
- Buddhadeb Bhattacharya
- Biman Bose
- Brinda Karat
- Surja Kanta Mishra
- A. K. Padmanabhan
- B.V. Raghavulu
- S. Ramachandran Pillai
- Manik Sarkar
- Nirupam Sen
- K. Varadarajan
- Pinarayi Vijayan
- Sitaram Yechury

=== 19th Politburo ===
The 19th Politburo was elected at the 19th party congress of CPI(M), held in Coimbatore from 29 March – 3 April 2008. Former Chief Minister of West Bengal Jyoti Basu was designated as a special invitee to the Politburo.

- Prakash Karat, General Secretary
- V. S. Achuthanandan (removed from the politburo on 12 July 2009)
- Sitaram Yechury
- Mohammed Amin
- Kodiyeri Balakrishnan
- Buddhadeb Bhattacharya
- Biman Bose
- Brinda Karat
- M. K. Pandhe
- B.V. Raghavulu
- S. Ramachandran Pillai
- Manik Sarkar
- Nirupam Sen
- K. Varadarajan
- Pinarayi Vijayan

=== 18th Politburo ===
The 18th Politburo was elected at the 18th party congress of CPI(M), held in Delhi from 6–11 April 2005.

- Prakash Karat, General Secretary
- V. S. Achuthanandan
- Jyoti Basu
- Buddhadeb Bhattacharjee
- Anil Biswas (died on 26 March 2006)
- Biman Bose
- Brinda Karat
- Chittabrata Majumdar (died on 20 February 2007)
- M. K. Pandhe
- S. Ramachandran Pillai
- B. V. Raghavulu
- Harkishan Singh Surjeet
- Manik Sarkar
- R. Umanath
- K. Varadarajan
- Pinarayi Vijayan
- Sitaram Yechury

=== 17th Politburo ===
The 17th Politburo was elected at the 17th party congress of CPI(M), held in Hyderabad from 19 to 24 March 2002.

- Harkishan Singh Surjeet, General Secretary
- V. S. Achuthanandan
- E. Balanandan
- Jyoti Basu
- Biman Bose
- Anil Biswas
- Sailen Dasgupta
- Prakash Karat
- E. K. Nayanar
- M. K. Pandhe
- S. Ramachandran Pillai
- P. Ramachandran
- Buddhadeb Bhattacharya
- Koratala Satyanarayana
- R. Umanath
- Sitaram Yechury
- Manik Sarkar
- Pinarayi Vijayan

=== 16th Politburo ===
The 16th Politburo was elected at the 16th party congress of CPI(M), held in Calcutta from 5–11 October 1998.

- Harkishan Singh Surjeet, General Secretary
- V. S. Achuthanandan
- E. Balanandan
- Jyoti Basu
- Benoy Choudhury
- Sailen Dasgupta
- Prakash Karat
- E. K. Nayanar
- S. Ramachandran Pillai
- P. Ramachandran
- R. Umanath
- Sitaram Yechury
- Moturu Hanumantha Rao

=== 15th Politburo ===
The 15th Politburo was elected at the 15th party congress of CPI(M), held in Chandigarh from 3–8 April 1995.

- Harkishan Singh Surjeet, General Secretary
- V. S. Achuthanandan
- E. Balanandan
- Jyoti Basu
- Benoy Choudhury
- Sailen Dasgupta
- Prakash Karat
- Sunil Maitra
- E. M. S. Namboodiripad
- E. K. Nayanar
- S. Ramachandran Pillai
- P. Ramachandran
- L.B.G. Rao
- R. Umanath
- Sitaram Yechury
- A. Nallasivan
- Moturu Hanumantha Rao

=== 14th Politburo ===
The 14th Politburo was elected at the 14th party congress of CPI(M), held in Madras from 3–9 January 1992.

- Harkishan Singh Surjeet, General Secretary
- V. S. Achuthanandan
- E. Balanandan
- Jyoti Basu
- Nripen Chakraborty
- Benoy Chaudhury
- Sailen Dasgupta
- Prakash Karat
- Sunil Maitra
- A. Nallasivan
- E. M. S. Namboodiripad
- E. K. Nayanar
- S. Ramachandran Pillai
- P. Ramachandran
- L.B.G. Rao
- M. Hanumantha Rao
- Sitaram Yechury

=== 13th Politburo ===
The 13th Politburo was elected at the 13th party congress of CPI(M), held in Trivandrum from 27 December 1988 to 1 January 1989.

- E. M. S. Namboodiripad, General Secretary
- B. T. Ranadive (Died on 6 April 1990)
- M. Basavapunniah
- Harkishan Singh Surjeet
- Jyoti Basu
- Samar Mukherjee
- E. Balanandan
- Nripen Chakraborty
- Saroj Mukherjee
- V. S. Achuthanandan
- A. Nallasivan
- L.B.G. Rao

=== 12th Politburo ===
The 12th Politburo was elected at the 12th party congress of CPI(M), held in Calcutta from 25 to 29 December 1985.

- E. M. S. Namboodiripad, General Secretary
- B. T. Ranadive
- M. Basavapunniah
- Harkishan Singh Surjeet
- Jyoti Basu
- Samar Mukherjee
- E. Balanandan
- Nripen Chakraborty
- Saroj Mukherjee
- V. S. Achuthanandan

=== 11th Politburo ===
The 11th Politburo was elected at the 11th party congress of CPI(M), held in Vijayawada from 26 to 31 January 1982.

- E. M. S. Namboodiripad, General Secretary
- B. T. Ranadive
- M. Basavapunniah
- P. Ramamurthi
- Promode Dasgupta (died on 29 November 1982)
- Jyoti Basu
- Harkishan Singh Surjeet
- Samar Mukherjee
- E. Balanandan

=== 10th Politburo ===
The 10th Politburo was elected at the 10th party congress of CPI(M), held in Jalandhar from 2–8 April 1978.

- E. M. S. Namboodiripad, General Secretary
- B. T. Ranadive
- P. Sundarayya
- M. Basavapunniah
- P. Ramamurthi
- Harkishan Singh Surjeet
- Jyoti Basu
- Promode Dasgupta
- Samar Mukherjee
- A. Balasubramaniam (died on 5 September 1981)
- E. Balanandan

=== 9th Politburo ===
The 9th Politburo was elected at the 10th party congress of CPI(M), held in Madurai from 27 June – 2 July 1972.

- P. Sundarayya, General Secretary
- E. M. S. Namboodiripad
- A. K. Gopalan
- M. Basavapunniah
- P. Ramamurthi
- B. T. Ranadive
- Harkishan Singh Surjeet
- Promode Dasgupta
- Jyoti Basu

=== 8th Politburo ===
The 8th Politburo was elected at the 8th party congress of CPI(M), held in Kochi from 23 to 29 December 1968.

- P. Sundarayya, General Secretary
- B. T. Ranadive
- M. Basavapunniah
- E. M. S. Namboodiripad
- Promode Dasgupta
- Jyoti Basu
- P. Ramamurthi
- Harkishan Singh Surjeet
- A. K. Gopalan

=== 7th Politburo ===
The 7th Politburo was elected at the 7th Party Congress of CPI(M) held in Calcutta from 31 October – 7 November 1964. It was the first Party Congress after the CPI(M) emerged from a split from the Communist Party of India in 1964.

- P. Sundarayya, General Secretary
- B. T. Ranadive
- Promode Dasgupta
- E. M. S. Namboodiripad
- M. Basavapunniah
- Harkishan Singh Surjeet
- P. Ramamurthi
- A. K. Gopalan
- Jyoti Basu

== See also ==
- Communist Party of India (Marxist)
- Students Federation of India
- Democratic Youth Federation of India
- All India Democratic Women's Association
- Centre of Indian Trade Unions
- All India Kisan Sabha (36 Canning Lane)
