= Raghavulu =

Raghavulu may refer to:

- B. V. Raghavulu, Indian politician
- J. V. Raghavulu (died 2013), famous music director and playback singer
