= A. K. Padmanabhan =

Indian politician

A. K. Padmanabhan is an Indian Marxist politician and former Politburo member of Communist Party of India (Marxist).

== Political career ==
Padmanabhan hails from Tamil Nadu. He became the Central Committee member of the party and in 20th party congress of CPI(M), held in Calicut in April 2012, he was first elected to the Politburo of the Communist Party of India (Marxist). In June 2013 he visited China as a delegate at the invitation of the Chinese Communist Party. In 2013, he became the president of the Centre of Indian Trade Unions (CITU). Padmanabhan was also re-elected to the Politburo at the 21st party congress held in Visakhapatnam in April 2015. In the 22nd party congress, he was replaced in the Politburo by Tapan Kumar Sen and remains as a Central Committee member of the party. Presently, Padmanabhan is the vice president of Centre of Indian Trade Unions.
