= Surjya Kanta Mishra =

Indian politician

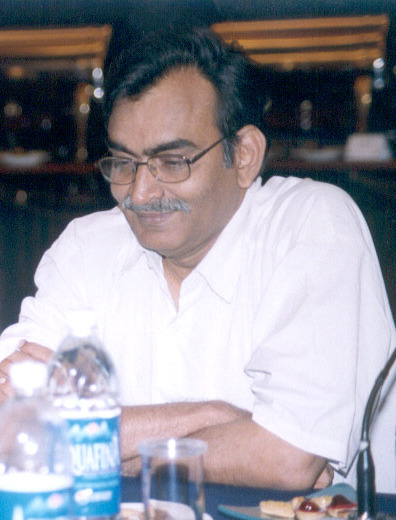
- Mishra in 2007

Member of Polit Bureau, Communist Party of India (Marxist)
- In office April 2012 – April 2025

State Secretary of the Communist Party of India (Marxist), West Bengal
- In office 2015–2022
- Preceded by: Biman Bose
- Succeeded by: Md. Salim

Cabinet Minister, Government of West Bengal
- In office 16 May 1991 – 13 May 2011
- Chief Minister: Jyoti Basu; Buddhadeb Bhattacharjee
- Ministry: Health & Family Welfare, Biotechnology, Panchayat Affairs & Rural Development
- Preceded by: Prasanta Chandra Sur (as Minister of Health and Family welfare)
- Succeeded by: Mamata Banerjee (as Minister of Health and Family welfare); Subrata Mukherjee (as Minister of Panchayat Affairs & Rural development)

Leader of the Opposition in West Bengal
- In office 1 June 2011 – 19 May 2016
- Deputy: Subhas Naskar
- Preceded by: Partha Chatterjee
- Succeeded by: Abdul Mannan

Member of Legislative Assembly, West Bengal
- In office 19 June 1991 – 19 May 2016
- Preceded by: Bibhuti Bhusan De
- Succeeded by: Pradyot Kumar Ghosh
- Constituency: Narayangarh

Personal details
- Born: 18 April 1949 (age 77) Narayangarh, West Bengal, India
- Party: CPI(M)
- Spouse: Usha Misra
- Education: SCB Medical College (MBBS); Midnapore College (BSc)
- Profession: Politician, Social worker, Doctor

Surjya Kanta Mishra (born 18 April 1949) is an Indian politician, belonging to the Communist Party of India (Marxist). He served as Minister of Health and Minister in-charge of Land & Land Reforms, Panchayats & Rural Development in the Left Front governments of West Bengal and was the Secretary of the Communist Party of India (Marxist), West Bengal State Committee between 2015 and 2022.

After the 2011 assembly election he was elected as Leader of the Opposition in the West Bengal Legislative Assembly in May 2011. He was inducted into the politburo of the CPI(M) following the death of veteran leader M.K. Pandhe in 2011. In 2015, he was elected as the state secretary of CPI(M) in West Bengal, succeeding Biman Bose.

== Early life ==
Mishra was born in Khakurda in Narayangarh. He is a qualified doctor. He received his MBBS degree from Srirama Chandra Bhanja Medical College and Hospital, Cuttack in 1971 and then a Diploma in Tuberculosis and Chest Diseases in 1974.

He also studied in Medinipur College and University of Calcutta.

== Early political life ==
Mishra's emergence in the political arena happened in the early 1970s, when he joined Students' Federation of India. Senior party leader Biman Bose heard the then SFI leader deliver a speech in Midnapore. Bose nudged Mishra to join politics full-time.

He was also involved in the peasants movement in the district and was associated with All India Kisan Sabha.

Surjya Kanta Mishra became a member of CPI(M) in 1973. He unsuccessfully contested the 1977 assembly election from Narayangarh.

The following year he contested a district council seat from Narayangarh. He was elected as the Chairperson of the Medinipur Zila Parishad in 1978 and served until 1991.

== Political career ==
In 1991, he was elected to the West Bengal Legislative Assembly and was inducted into the state cabinet as a cabinet minister. He continued to represent Narayangarh till 2016.

Within his capacity as a cabinet minister he served in the Land & Land Reforms, Panchayats & Rural Development departments. He has also served as Minister-In-Charge of Health and Family Welfare, Biotechnology. He remained in the state cabinet till 2011.

He became a state committee member in 1988 and a state secretariat member in 1995. He was elected to the Central committee of the party in 2002. He was elevated to the Politburo of the party in 2012.

Mishra, regarded as a hardliner, was part of the team that voted against Jyoti Basu becoming prime minister of a Left supported Congress-led government in 1996. Again, he was the one who, other hardliners, thought withdrawing support to UPA-I in 2008 over the US nuke deal was right.

After the defeat of the CPI(M) in the 2011 assembly election he was elected as Leader of the Opposition in the West Bengal Legislative Assembly in May 2011 and continued till 2016. He lost to TMC's Prodyut Kumar Ghosh with a margin over 13,500 votes in the 2016 assembly election as a candidate in Narayangarh.

In 2015, he succeeded Biman Bose as the secretary of the West Bengal state committee. He is also a member of the all India working committee of All India Kisan Sabha. He was re-elected as secretary of the West Bengal state committee in 2018.

In 2022, he stepped down from his position as secretary of the West Bengal state committee and was succeeded by Mohammed Salim. He also left the membership of the state committee owing to the age-limit. He continued to be a member of the central committee and politburo of CPI(M).

However, he continues to be active in the political space in the state.

== Electoral history ==
Mishra was elected as Member of Legislative Assembly from the Narayangarh (Vidhan Sabha constituency) for five consecutive terms.

| Election Year | Office Held | Constituency | Party affiliation | Result |
|---|---|---|---|---|
| 1977 | Member of the legislative assembly | Narayangarh | Communist Party of India (Marxist) | Lost |
| 1991 | Member of the legislative assembly | Narayangarh | Communist Party of India (Marxist) | Won |
| 1996 | Member of the legislative assembly | Narayangarh | Communist Party of India (Marxist) | Won |
| 2001 | Member of the legislative assembly | Narayangarh | Communist Party of India (Marxist) | Won |
| 2006 | Member of the legislative assembly | Narayangarh | Communist Party of India (Marxist) | Won |
| 2011 | Member of the legislative assembly | Narayangarh | Communist Party of India (Marxist) | Won |
| 2016 | Member of the legislative assembly | Narayangarh | Communist Party of India (Marxist) | Lost |

== Personal life ==
Mishra is married to Usha Misra. The couple has two daughters.

Even after shifting base to Kolkata and becoming a heavy weight minister in the state cabinet, Mishra stuck to his roots.

Political offices
| Preceded by Prasanta Sur | Minister of Health, Biotechnology, Panchayat Affairs & Rural Development in the West Bengal Government; 1996 – 2011 | Succeeded by Mamata Banerjee Subrata Mukherjee |
| Preceded by Partha Chatterjee | Leader of the Opposition in the West Bengal Legislative Assembly; 2011 – 2016 | Succeeded by Abdul Mannan |
State Legislative Assembly
| Preceded by Bibhuti Bhusan De | Member of the West Bengal Legislative Assembly from Narayangarh Assembly constituency 1991 – 2016 | Succeeded by Pradyot Kumar Ghosh |
CPI-M Party political offices
| Preceded by Biman Bose | West Bengal State Secretary of the CPI(M); 2015 – | Succeeded by Incumbent |
| Preceded by - | Member of Polit Bureau of the CPI(M); 2011 – | Succeeded by Incumbent |
