= Laal Kuthi =

Lal Kuthi
- Directed by: Kanak Mukherjee
- Screenplay by: Batra Mahinder
- Story by: Batra Mahinder
- Produced by: Asish Roy
- Starring: Ranjit Mallick; Tanuja; Danny Denzongpa; Utpal Dutt; Tarun Kumar
- Cinematography: Ashok Mehta
- Edited by: Keshav Naidu
- Music by: Swapan Jagmohan
- Release date: 3 March 1978
- Country: India
- Language: Bengali

Laal Kuthi is a 1978 Indian bilingual action thriller film directed by Kanak Mukherjee. Simultaneously shot in Bengali and Hindi-languages, the film stars Ranjit Mallick, Tanuja, Danny Denzongpa, Utpal Dutt and Tarun Kumar.

The original music was by Sapan Jagmohan.

== Cast ==
- Ranjit Mallick
- Tanuja
- Utpal Dutt
- Danny Denzongpa
- Anil Dhawan

== Soundtrack ==
Bengali (Lal Kuthi)

All lyrics were written by Mukul Dutt. The songs are:

1. Tare Bholano Gelo Na (sung by Asha Bhosle)

2. Dhole Jete Jete (sung by Asha Bhosle and Kishore Kumar)

3. Karo Keu Noiko Ami (sung by Kishore Kumar and Nabanita)

4. Ke Jaay Re (sung by Asha Bhosle)

5. Karo Keu Noiko Ami- Sad version (sung by Kishore Kumar)

Hindi (Lal Kothi)

All lyrics are written by Naqsh Lall Puri; all music is composed by Sapan Jagmohan.

No.	Title	Singer(s)	Length
1.	"Ae Mere Dil Dewane"	Asha Bhosle
2.	"Dhala Din Ayse"	Amit Kumar, Asha Bhosle
3.	"Kya Kahoon Kaun Koon Main"	Kishore Kumar
4.	"Dil se Bhulayi Gayi Na Teri Yaad"	Asha Bhosle
5.	"Kya Kahoon Kaun Koon Main (Sad)"	Kishore Kumar
