= 2018 West Bengal local elections =

Local Village body elections in India

2018 West Bengal Panchayat General Elections
← 2013	14 May 2018	2023 →
- Turnout: 82.13%

	Majority party	Minority party
Leader	Mamata Banerjee	Dilip Ghosh
Party	AITC	BJP
Seats won	Gram Panchayat : 38,118 Panchayat Samiti :8,062; Zilla Parishad : 793 Vote Percentage - 72%	Gram Panchayat : 5,779 Panchayat Samiti :769; Zilla Parishad : 22 Vote Percentage - 13%
	Third party	Fourth party
Leader	Surja Kanta Mishra	Adhir Ranjan Chowdhury
Party	CPI(M)	INC
Alliance	Left Front
Seats won	Gram Panchayat : 1483 Panchayat Samiti : 110; Zilla Parishad : 1 – Vote Percentage - 6%	Gram Panchayat : 1066 Panchayat Samiti :133; Zilla Parishad : 6 Vote Percentage - 5%

Panchayat elections were held in the Indian state of West Bengal in May 2018. The polls were hit with widespread violence throughout the state. The ruling All India Trinamool Congress won 1/3 of the total electoral seats uncontested, although there were widespread instances of TMC cadres using violence to prevent candidates of the Opposition from filing their nominations.

== Results ==
2018 West Bengal Panchayat General Elections
Local body type	Local body seats won				
Local body type	AITC	BJP	LF	INC	Others
Gram Panchayats	38118	5779	1713	1066	1960
Panchayat Samitis	8062	769	129	133	121
Zilla Parishads	793	22	1	6	2
