= B. V. Raghavulu =

Indian politician

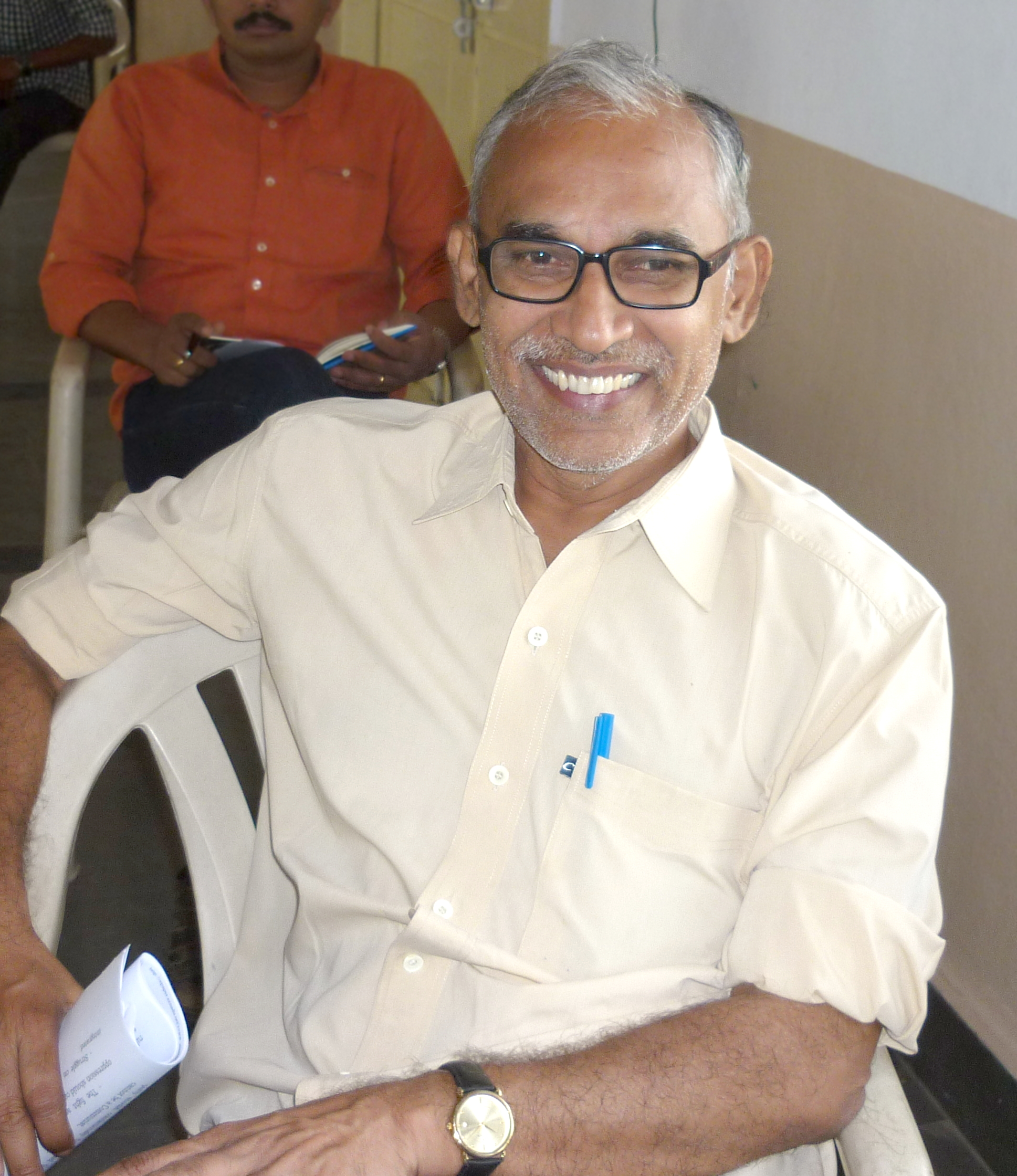
- Raghavulu

Personal details
- Party: Communist Party of India (Marxist)
- Occupation: Politician

Bodapati Venkata Raghavulu is an Indian communist politician from Andhra Pradesh. He is also a Politburo member of Communist Party of India (Marxist). He was the last state secretary of the unified Andhra Pradesh State Committee of the party, till its bifurcation in March 2014.

== Early life ==
Raghavulu was born to Venkata Subbaiah and Punnamma in Pedamopadu village in Prakasam district of Andhra Pradesh. After schooling in Kandukuru, he joined Andhra Christian College in Guntur for his intermediate education. Then, he went to Bapatla and joined Bachelor of Science at the Bapatla Agricultural College. For various reasons, he was compelled to drop out of the course. Afterwards, he joined Kavali College for Bachelor of Arts course. When he was pursuing his final year course of graduation, emergency was declared in the country. After appearing for the final examinations, he left for Nellore as a full-time activist of the party.

== Political career ==
During the emergency period, many top leaders of the party were either arrested or went underground themselves. This gave an opportunity to Raghavulu to manage the party office at his best. The party later, during emergency period itself, sent him to Visakhapatnam. There he founded the student movement. While he was at Visakhapatnam, he completed a diploma in English and enrolled for Master of Arts in history. Up to December 1981, he was the office bearer for Students Federation of India.
Completing his M.A. in distinction, he pursued a research in economics as scholar. Meanwhile, party secretary of the Visakhapatnam unit expired succumbing to ill health. Very shortly after his death, the new secretary died in a road accident. It turned on Raghavulu to take over as secretary checking his research. In 1994 he was elected as state secretary of the Centre for Indian Trade Unions (CITU).
At the state conference of the party in December 1997 in Nalgonda, Raghavulu was elected as the state secretary of the party. In February 2008, he was unanimously re-elected for the fourth consecutive term on the concluding day of the 22nd State Party Convention in Hyderabad, and remained in that office till March 2014. Later, two committees were formed for Andhra Pradesh and Telangana, following the bifurcation of the state.

=== Resignation from Polit Bureau ===
It was widely reported in the media that Raghavulu has resigned to all posts in the party other than primary membership, on allegations of his mishandling of organisational affairs. Citing sources there were news reports that he was responsible for many of its party cadre being shunned out. Sitaram Yechury clarified in a press meet that Polit Bureau discussed issues. Raghavulu is in the Polit Bureau and will continue.

== Family life ==
Raghavulu is married Sunkara Punyavathi, one of his co-activists while he was doing his research at the Andhra University in Visakhapatnam. Punyavathi is now the state vice president of the Centre of Indian Trade Unions and was the general secretary of All India Democratic Women's Association. The couple have a daughter.
