= K. Chathunni =

Indian politician (1921–1990)

General Secretary of the All India Kisan Sabha
- In office 1 April 1979 – 11 November 1982
- Preceded by: Hare Krishna Konar
- Succeeded by: Santimoy Ghosh

Member of Rajya Sabha
- In office 22 April 1979 – 21 April 1985
- Constituency: Kerala

Member of the Kerala Legislative Assembly
- In office 3 March 1967 – 22 March 1977
- Preceded by: constituency established
- Succeeded by: N.P. Moiteen
- Constituency: Beypore

Personal details
- Born: 1921
- Died: 10 August 1990 (aged 68–69)
- Party: Communist Party of India (Marxist)

K. Chatunni (1921 – 10 August 1990), popularly known as Chathunni Master, was an Indian communist politician and member of the Rajya Sabha from Kerala for 6 years and was also the general secretary of the All India Kisan Sabha. Chatunni was also a member of the Kerala Legislative Assembly for 10 years.

== Political life ==
Chathunni Master entered politics at an early age through the Indian National Congress and later became a member of the Communist Party of India. He quit his teaching job and became active full-time in the Communist Party. He had to spend several times in jail and worked from the front in building the communist movement and the peasant movement. He held the posts of Kozhikode District Secretary and State Council Member of CPI. He joined the Communist Party of India (Marxist) after the 1964 split in the Communist Party of India and held the posts of CPI(M) State Secretariat Member, Kozhikode District Secretary, and State President of The Farmers' Association. He was also active in the peasant movement and was the national general secretary of the All India Kisan Sabha. He was the editor of Chinta Weekly and a member of the editorial committee of Deshabhimani newspaper.

In 1965, he was elected as Member of the Legislative Assembly for the first time by defeating Sharada Krishnan from Beypore by more than ten thousand votes. Later, the victory was repeated from Beypur in 1967 and 1970. In 1977, Congress worker and N. P. Mohammed's brother, N. P. Moiteen, defeated him in Beypore constituency. But the very next year he was elected to the Rajya Sabha from Kerala.

== Expulsion from CPM ==
He was expelled from the party. The CPI(M) has said that he was expelled from the party because he was not honest in financial transactions, created a lack of trust and contempt among the party ranks, and acted against the party's policies. According to a press release published by the State Secretariat in Desabhimani on 24 June 1985.
