= Nilotpal Basu =

Indian politician

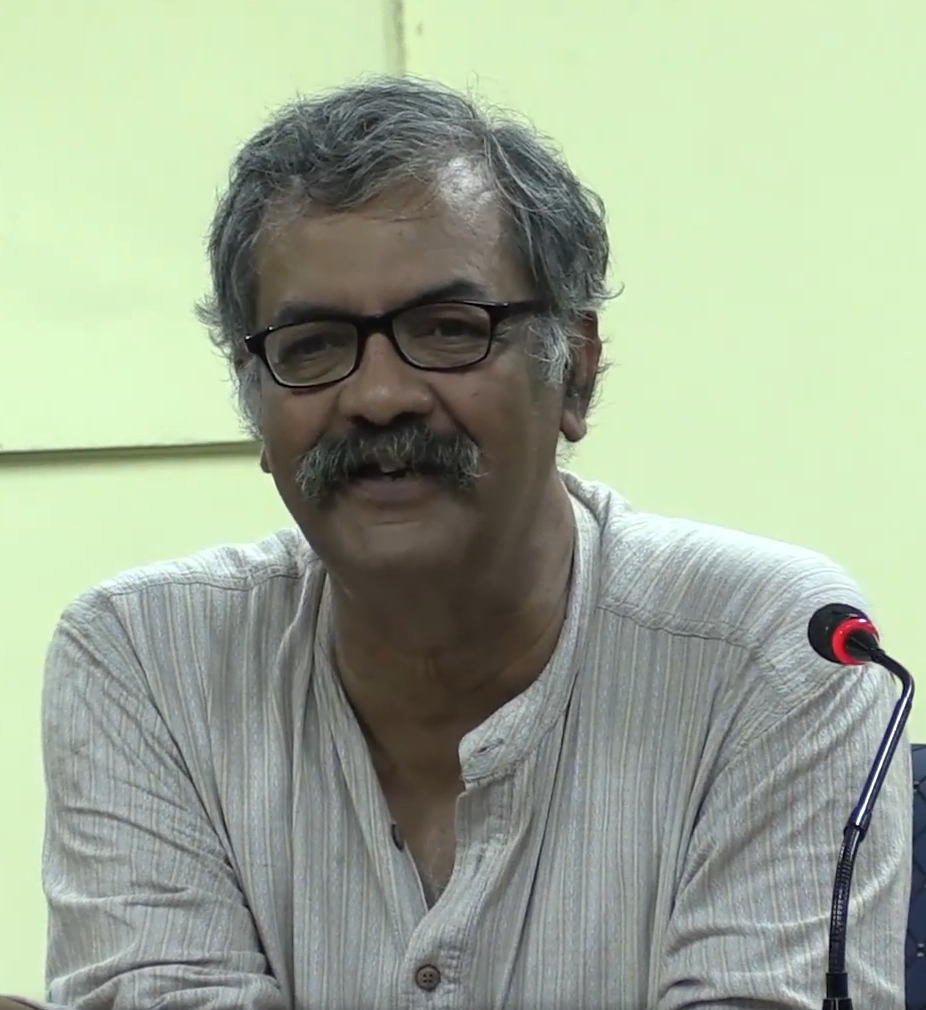

Member of the Politburo of the Communist Party of India (Marxist)
- Incumbent
- Assumed office April 2018

Member of Parliament, Rajya Sabha
- In office 1994–2006
- Constituency: West Bengal

Personal details
- Born: 31 December 1956 (age 69)
- Party: Communist Party of India (Marxist)

Nilotpal Basu is an Indian politician. He was a Member of Parliament, representing West Bengal in the Rajya Sabha, the upper house of India's Parliament, as a member of the Communist Party of India (Marxist). He runs an NGO called Grameen Sanchar Society (GRASSO) which started a Mobile PCO scheme in West Bengal with state and BSNL support. Basu got into controversy after bank loans taken by the GRASSO were not repaid.
