= Saroj Mukherjee =

Indian Politician (1911–1990)

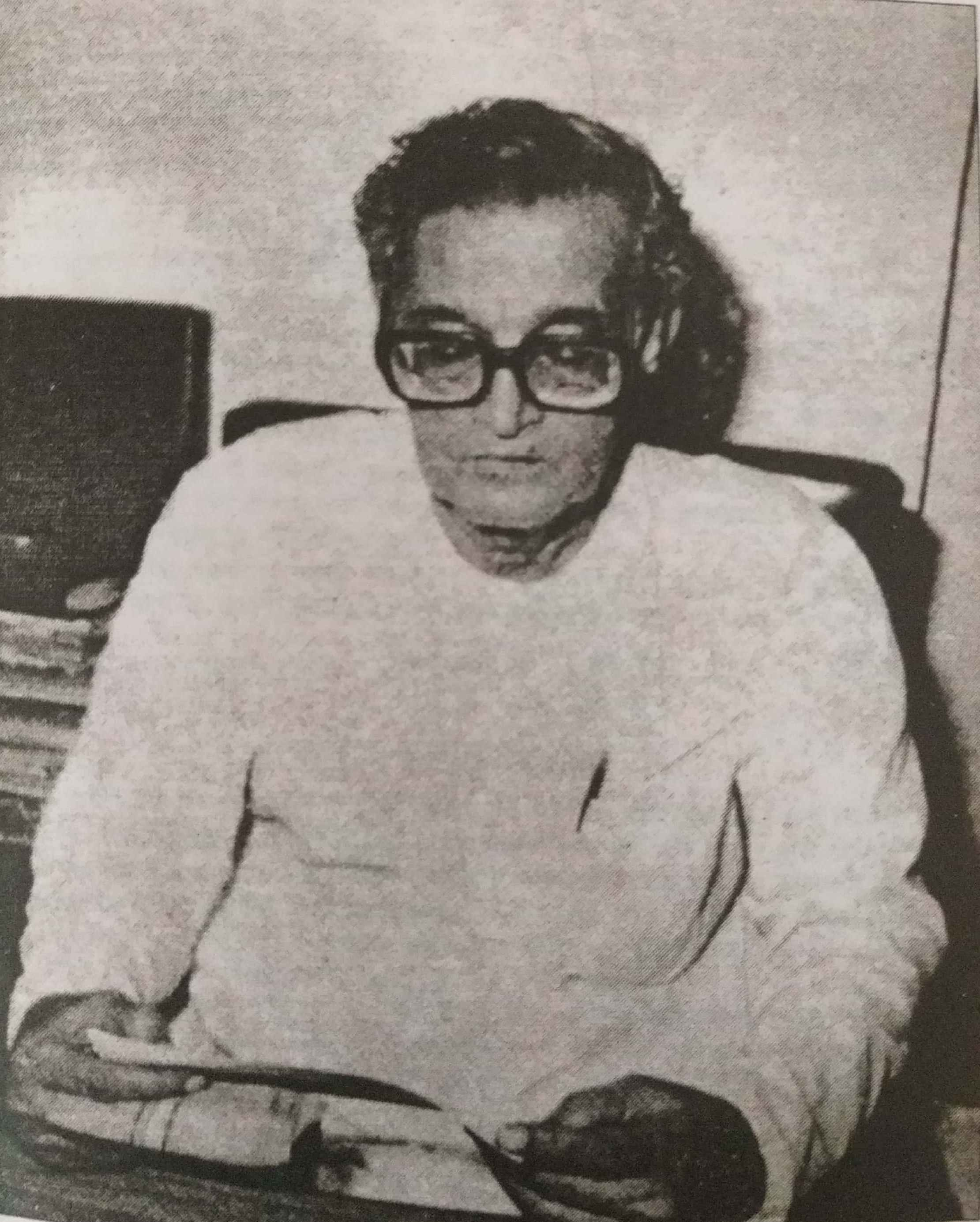

Member of the Politburo of the Communist Party of India (Marxist)
- In office 1985–1990

Chairman of the Left Front
- In office 1982 – 1990
- Preceded by: Promode Dasgupta
- Succeeded by: Sailen Dasgupta

West Bengal State Secretary of the CPI(M)
- In office 1982 – 1990
- Preceded by: Promode Dasgupta
- Succeeded by: Sailen Dasgupta

Member of Parliament, Lok Sabha
- In office 1971 – 1977
- Preceded by: D. Sen
- Succeeded by: Dhirendra Nath Basu
- Constituency: Katwa

Personal details
- Born: 14 January 1911 Bahadurpur, Bengal Presidency, British India
- Died: 10 February 1990 (aged 79)
- Party: Indian National Congress (1924–1931); Communist Party of India (1931–1964); Communist Party of India (Marxist) (1964–1990)
- Spouse: Kanak Mukherjee (m. 1941)

Saroj Mukherjee (Bengali সরোজ মুখোপাধ্যায়, 14 January 1911 – 9 February 1990) was an Indian freedom fighter and a member of the Polit Bureau of the Communist Party of India (Marxist). He was also the secretary of the West Bengal state committee of the Communist party.

== Early life ==
He was born in Bahadurpur, Paschim Bardhaman in erstwhile Bengal Presidency of British India (now in West Bengal, India). His father was Shikkhabroti Trilochan. He joined political activities from the beginning of 1920s. In 1928 he passed Matriculation from Burdwan Municipal High School. He passed I.Sc. from Serampore College with scholarship.

As a student at the age of thirteen, Mukherjee joined the Indian freedom movement, joining the Indian National Congress party in 1924 along with his friend Benoy Chowdhury. He also joined the Jugantar group in 1928. While studying in Serampore College, he and Benoy Chowdhury became acquainted with Dr. Bhupendranath Datta and Communist leaders Muzaffar Ahmed and Abdul Halim.

== Political activities ==
In 1930, he participated in the Salt March and was jailed. After being released, he got admitted in Vidyasagar College. He was again arrested before he could sit for his B.A. examination. While in jail he passed B.A. and studied for M.A. and law. He was released from jail in 1938.

He joined the Communist Party of India in 1931 and went to work for them full-time in 1938.

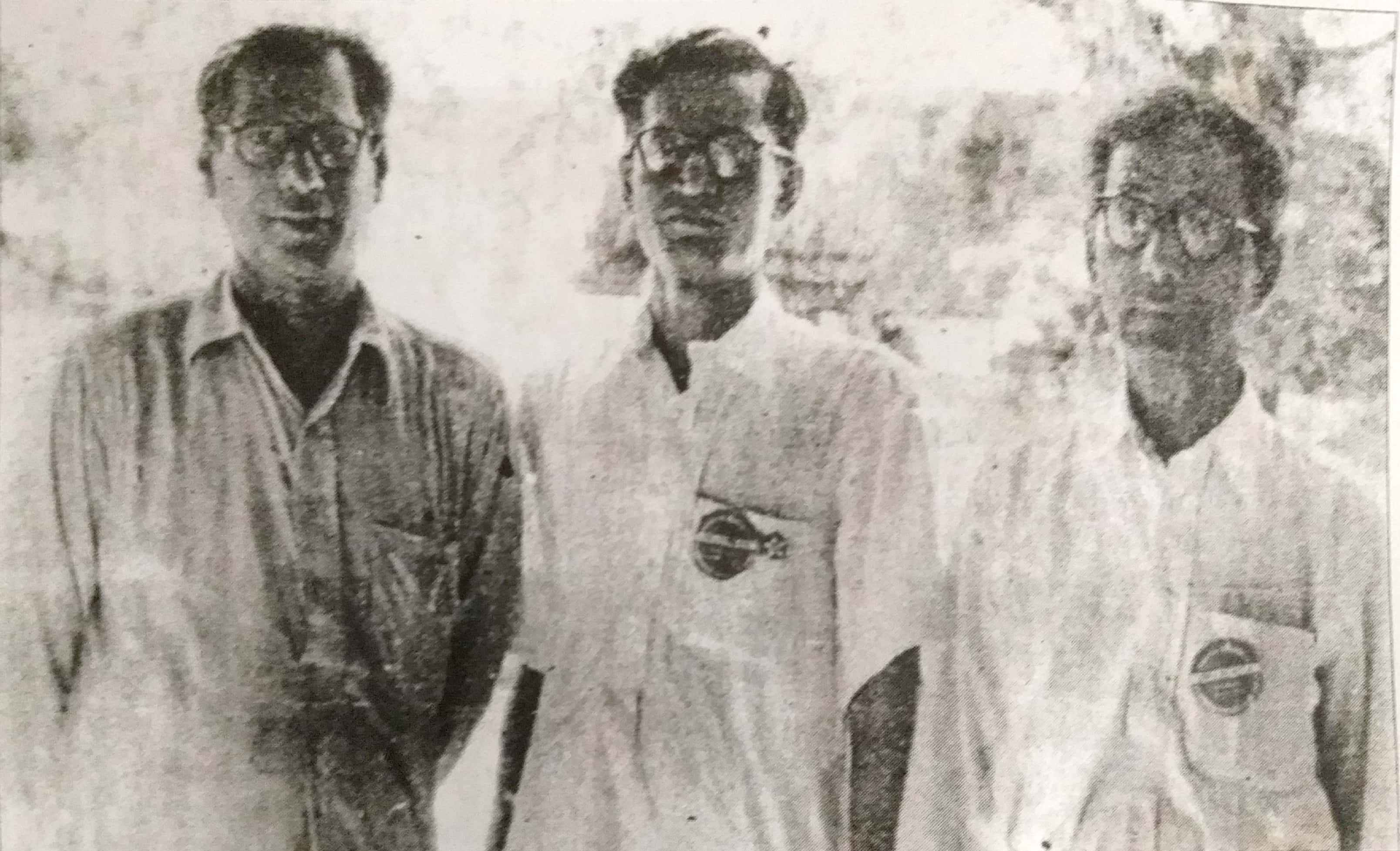
(From left to right) Abdul Halim, Saroj Mukherjee, Muzaffar Ahmed at Bengal Provincial Conference (1938 December - 1939 January) of CPI at Chandarnagore.

In 1941, Saroj Mukherjee married Kanak Dasgupta, who was also a Communist leader.

From 1939 to 1943, he was the Kolkata District Committee Secretary of CPI. From 1943 to 1948 and 1951 to 1962, he was a member of Bengal State Committee of CPI.

Mukherjee was the editor of the Bengali daily Swadhinata from 1956 to 1962. Later, he was the first editor and publisher of CPI(M)'s newspaper Ganashakti, which position he held until his death. He was one of the founder-members of CPI(M), when CPI got divided in 1964. He was a member of the Central Committee of CPI(M) from 1978 until his death. He was elected from Katwa (Lok Sabha constituency) in Barddhaman in 1971. After the death of Pramode Dasgupta in 1982, he became the West Bengal State Secretary of CPI(M). In 1985 he became a Politburo member of CPI(M).

Several books were written by him including:

- Trade Union-er gorar kotha
- 1905 saler rush biplob
- Swadhinatar Juge Rangpur
- Trade Union Andoloner Notun Dhara
- Tinti Dashak
- Dui Pathikrit
- Duiti Smaraniyo Din
- Rajniti o Sangbadikota
- Bharater Communist Party o Amra

He died on 10 February 1990.

== See also ==
- Communist Party of India (Marxist)
- Kanak Mukherjee
