= Anil Biswas (politician) =

Indian politician (1944–2006)

Comrade Anil Biswas

Member of Polit Bureau, Communist Party of India (Marxist)
- In office 11 October 1998 – 26 March 2006

West Bengal State Secretary of the CPI(M)
- In office 1998 – 26 March 2006
- Preceded by: Sailen Dasgupta
- Succeeded by: Biman Bose

Personal details
- Born: 1 March 1944 Karimpur, West Bengal, India
- Died: 26 March 2006 (aged 62) Kolkata, West Bengal, India
- Party: Communist Party of India (Marxist)
- Occupation: Politician

Anil Biswas (1 March 1944 – 26 March 2006), often referred to as Keru, was an Indian communist politician. He was the secretary of the West Bengal State Committee of Communist Party of India (Marxist) and member of the party's politburo beginning in 1998 until his death in 2006.

== Early life ==
Biswas born in a middle class Mahishya family of Darermath village near Karimpur, Nadia district, to Ashutosh Biswas and Prafulla Kumari Debi. He lost his father at a tender age. While in high school he was attracted to the Left movement in the area. in 1961 he joined the Krishnagar Government College and came under the influence of Marxist leaders like Harinarayan Adhikari and Dinesh Majumdar and also became an active member of the Students' Federation of India. He was a student leader in College elections. After taking an Honours degree in Political science, he shifted to Kolkata to pursue his academic career.

== Politics ==
He became the full-fledged party member of the CPI(M) in 1965. In the same year he was arrested under the Defence of India Rules 1962 and was imprisoned for 11 months. From jail custody he completed the master's degree in political science. In 1969, he became a whole timer of the party and began his party work as a journalist in the Ganashakti, the party's daily organ.

Biswas was elected to the CPIM West Bengal state committee in 1978 and elected to the state secretariat in 1982. Biswas remained closely associated with Ganashakti and edited it between 1983 and 1998. It was during his editorship the newspaper reached the height of circulation. Biswas became member of the Central Committee of the party in the year of 1985. "It was due to his guidance that the Ganashakthi became a full-fledged and comprehensive newspaper," CPIM said in homage to Biswas.

In 1998, he became a member of the Polit Bureau. He was mentored by Pramod Dasgupta.

In 1998, took charge as the secretary of the State committee after his predecessor Sailen Dasgupta resigned owing to ill-health and old age. He was reelected as state secretary in 2002 and 2005.

He was the editor of Marxbadi Path (The Road of the Marxist), the theoretical quarterly in West Bengal.

== Death ==
He died on 26 March 2006 after being hospitalised by a brain haemorrhage on 18 March. His body was donated to NRS Medical College and Hospital according to his last wishes. He is survived by his wife Gita and daughter Ajanta.

== Sources ==
- Obituary on sify.com
- "Anil Biswas dead" - The Hindu article dated 26 March 2006
- "CPI(M) leader Anil Biswas dead" - Hindustan Times article dated 26 March 2006
- "Homage to Comrade Anil Biswas"
- "Anil Biswas: Farewell Beloved Comrade!" People's Democracy article dated 2 April 2006
