= All India Kisan Sabha (36 Canning Lane) =

Farmers' wing of Communist Pary of India (Marxist)

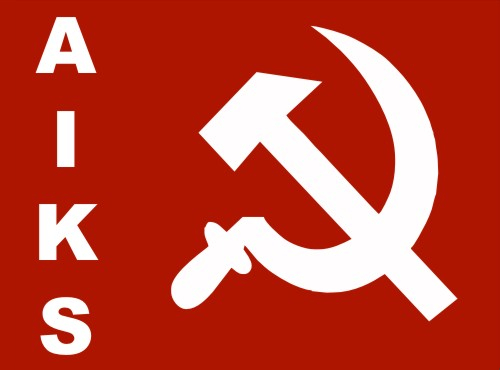
- Abbreviation: AIKS
- Formation: 28 January 1968 (57 years ago)
- Type: Peasant Organisation
- Legal status: Active
- Headquarters: Harkishan Singh Surjeet Bhawan, 10, 11, 12, Indrajit Gupta Marg, Rouse Avenue, New Delhi, India–110002
- President: Ashok Dhawale
- General Secretary: Vijoo Krishnan
- Affiliations: Communist Party of India (Marxist)
- Website: kisansabha.org

The All India Kisan Sabha (AIKS), or Akhil Bharatiya Kisan Sabha, is the peasant front of the Communist Party of India (Marxist) and works for farmer's rights, peasant rights, and anti-feudal movement in India.

This organization is sometimes referred to as All India Kisan Sabha (36 Canning Lane), to distinguish it from the All India Kisan Sabha of Communist Party of India. All India Kisan Sabha (36 Canning Lane) was previously known as All India Kisan Sabha (Ashoka Road).

== History ==
After the 1964 split in the Communist Party of India, there were efforts to retain AIKS as a united organization. However, there were tensions between the leftist and rightist factions within the AIKS. But soon, at the 28 August 1967 Central Kisan Council meeting in Madurai, differences arose over the membership figures. The Communist Party of India (Marxist) faction in AIKS accused the Communist Party of India faction of presenting falsely inflated membership data of state units in order to increase their influence in the organization. The dispute led to a walk-out from the Central Kisan Council. Due to the disruptive activities of those leaders, finally, there was a split in the Kisan Sabha, and another Kisan Sabha was constituted in October 1967, after a section of the leadership left the AIKS and formed a separate Sabha.

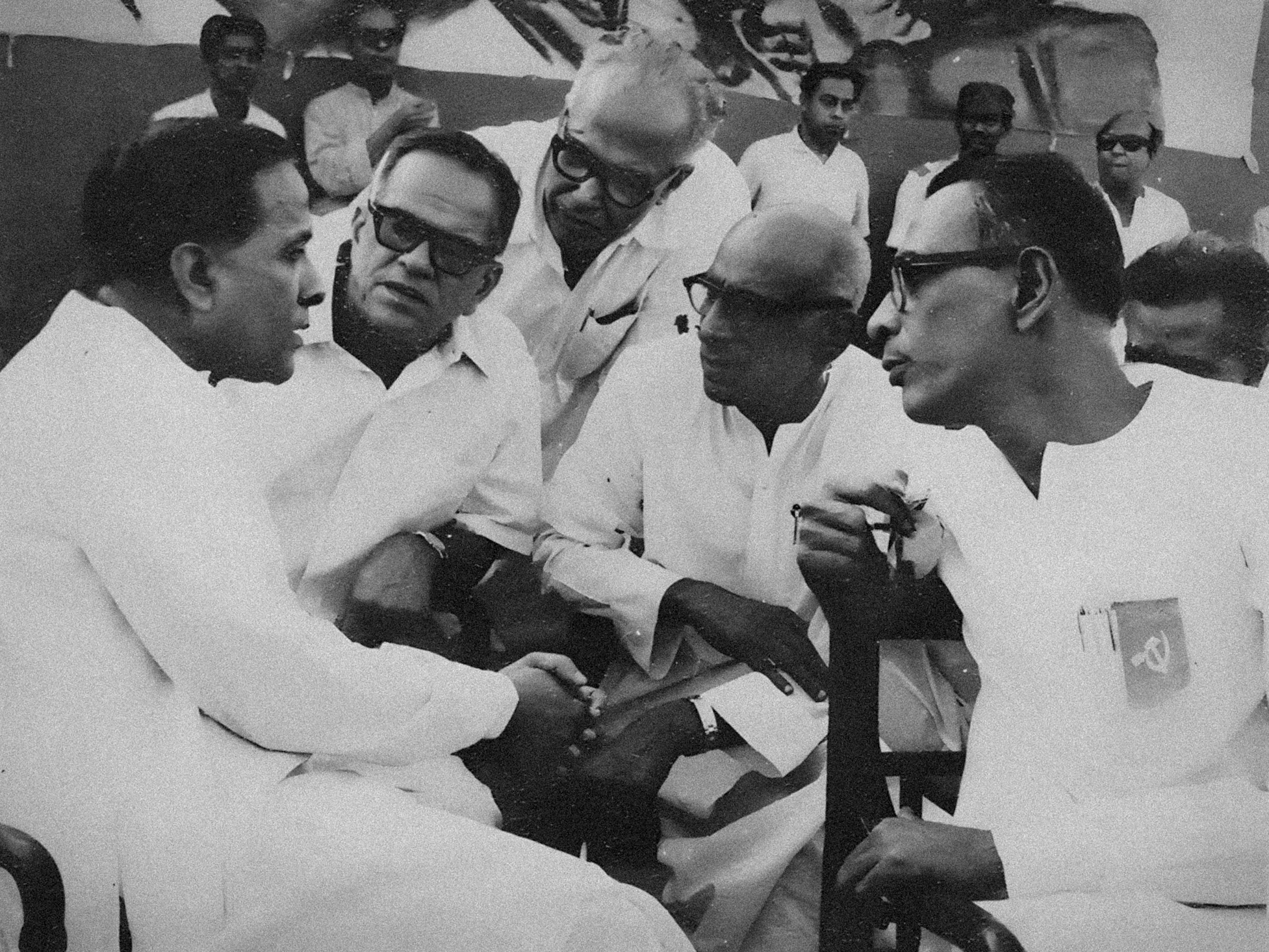
Basu, Ranadive, Mukherjee, Basavapunnaiah, and Konar in the conference of AIKS held in Barsul, West Bengal in 1969

As a result, the CPI faction constitutes a parallel All India Kisan Sabha of its own by holding their 19th All India Conference at Amravati, Maharashtra, in January 1968. And the CPI(M) faction constitutes All India Kisan Sabha (36 Canning Lane) by holding its 19th All India Conference at Madurai, Tamil Nadu, on January 26–28, 1968. In Madurai, the conference amended its constitution and abolished AIKC as it rarely met. As there was no AIKC, the conference directly elected the CKC and office bearers for the first time. The conference elected A. K. Gopalan as its president, and Hare Krishna Konar was elected the general secretary. The conference also elected a 33-member CKC, including office bearers. On the last evening, a public rally was held at Madurai. A large number of peasants, agricultural workers, and working-class people attended the huge gathering. It was addressed by J. S. Lyallpuri, E. M. S. Namboodiripad, P. Ramamurthi, and others. A decision was taken to shift the central office. The Central Office of the Kisan Sabha was shifted from Delhi, 4 Ashoka Road, in April 1968, to Calcutta, first at 49 Lake Place and then to 36A Beniapukur Road, Calcutta 14.

== National office bearers ==
The 35th All India Conference held at Thrissur, Kerala from 13–16 December 2022 elected Vijoo Krishnan as the general secretary of All India Kisan Sabha. National president Ashok Dhawale and finance secretary P. Krishna Prasad retained their positions from the previous Hisar conference.

| National Conference | Date | Place | President | General Secretary |
|---|---|---|---|---|
| 19th | 26–28 January 1968 | Madurai | A. K. Gopalan | Hare Krishna Konar |
| 20th | 30 October–3 November 1969 | Barsul | A. K. Gopalan | Hare Krishna Konar |
| 21st | 23–26 September 1971 | Rurka Kalan | A. K. Gopalan | Hare Krishna Konar |
| 22nd | 11–14 April 1974 | Sikar | A. K. Gopalan | Hare Krishna Konar |
| 23rd | 30 March–1 April 1979 | Varanasi | Benoy Choudhury | K. Chathunni |
| 24th | 8–11 November 1982 | Midnapore | Udaraju Raman | Santimoy Ghosh |
| 25th | 17–19 May 1986 | Patna | Godavari Parulekar | N. Sankaraiah |
| 26th | 27–30 April 1989 | Khammam | Harkishan Singh Surjeet | Ram Narayan Goswami |
| 27th | 27–30 September 1992 | Hisar | N. Sankaraiah | Ram Narayan Goswami |
| 28th | 19–20 November 1995 | Cuttack | Benoy Krishna Konar | S. Ramachandran Pillai |
| 29th | 5–8 March 1999 | Kozhikode | S. Ramachandran Pillai | K. Varadarajan |
| 30th | 6–9 March 2003 | Jalandhar | S. Ramachandran Pillai | K. Varadarajan |
| 31st | 28–31 January 2006 | Nashik | S. Ramachandran Pillai | K. Varadarajan |
| 32nd | 7–10 January 2010 | Guntur | S. Ramachandran Pillai | K. Varadarajan |
| 33rd | 24–27 July 2013 | Cuddalore | Amra Ram | Hannan Mollah |
| 34th | 3–6 October 2017 | Hisar | Ashok Dhawale | Hannan Mollah |
| 35th | 13–16 December 2022 | Thrissur | Ashok Dhawale | Vijoo Krishnan |

== Membership chart ==
This chart uses the Indian numeral system

| State/Union territory | 1993-94 | 1994-95 | 1995-96 | 1996-97 | 1997-98 | 1998-99 | 1999–2000 |
| Andhra Pradesh | 2,11,465 | 1,37,100 | 2,25,137 | 2,25,234 | 1,00,808 | 2,15,930 | 1,00,000 |
| Assam | 1,44,538 | 1,59,723 | 1,01,324 | 1,44,545 | 1,18,611 | 1,61,277 | 1,44,588 |
| Bihar | 2,10,000 | 2,30,100 | 1,52,000 | 2,00,000 | 2,04,000 | 2,17,000 | 1,84,000 |
| Gujarat | 13,000 | 9,140 | 11,500 | 6,000 | 6,000 | 8,400 | 10,440 |
| Haryana | 14,500 | 12,500 | 12,300 | 13,000 | 15,000 | 14,100 | 16,150 |
| Himachal Pradesh | 5,200 | 5,000 | 6,000 | 7,000 | 13,000 | 12,780 | 10,000 |
| Jammu and Kashmir | 4,500 | 5,000 | 5,000 | 5,000 | 6,000 | 4,000 | 7,000 |
| Karnataka | 52,000 | 75,000 | 89,633 | 92,568 | 67,160 | 73,515 | 70,775 |
| Kerala | 10,05,760 | 12,26,488 | 11,91,666 | 13,23,562 | 13,33,620 | 17,66,606 | 19,45,366 |
| Madhya Pradesh | 19,000 | 19,252 | 36,012 | 37,482 | 48,965 | 37,534 | 50,411 |
| Maharashtra | 69,800 | 70,000 | 85,343 | 92,273 | 90,371 | 92,340 | 1,21,807 |
| Manipur | 5,740 | 4,100 | 4,720 | 5,140 | 4,700 | 4,960 | - |
| Odisha | 22,000 | 18,349 | 26,392 | 21,700 | 22,000 | 31,364 | 30,000 |
| Punjab | 80,000 | 1,05,600 | 1,30,120 | 90,000 | 1,02,000 | 1,06,000 | 1,20,000 |
| Rajasthan | 32,432 | 71,659 | 36,000 | 54,040 | 55,893 | 59,496 | 50,950 |
| Sikkim | 500 | 1,600 | 2,000 | - | 1,600 | - | - |
| Tamil Nadu | 2,50,000 | 2,50,000 | 2,46,289 | 3,00,000 | 2,71,355 | 3,00,000 | 4,01,029 |
| Tripura K.S. | 1,01,000 | 1,11,920 | 1,26,500 | 2,12,000 (KS+GMP) | 1,21,500 | 1,38,000 | 1,35,650 |
| Tripura G.M.P | 52,000 | 60,000 | 85,000 | see above | 92,000 | 92,000 | 70,000 |
| Uttar Pradesh | 89,655 | 1,28,450 | 1,26,000 | 1,60,000 | 1,15,844 | 1,37,499 | 1,15,084 |
| West Bengal | 99,54,652 | 1,05,38,499 | 1,11,06,406 | 1,14,59,519 | 1,00,55,121 | 1,12,18,075 | 1,10,11,153 |
| Total: | 1,23,37,742 | 1,32,39,480 | 1,36,25,726 | 1,44,49,063 | 1,28,45,248 | 1,46,90,879 | 1,45,94,403 |

== Activities ==
=== Protest against three Agri-bills ===
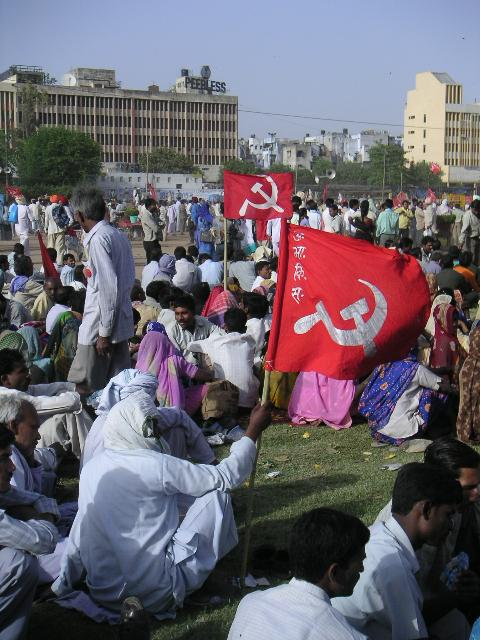
AIKS demonstrators in Ramlila Maidan, Delhi, on 2005

AIKS led nationwide protests against Farmers' Produce Trade and Commerce (Promotion and Facilitation) Act, 2020, Farmers (Empowerment and Protection) Agreement on Price Assurance and Farm Services Act, 2020 and Essential Commodities (Amendment) Act, 2020.

- 26 January 2021: AIKS organized tractor rally in national capital.
- 25 January 2021: 50,000 farmers from various regions of Maharashtra marched towards the Raj Bhavan and submitted its charter of demands to Governor Bhagat Singh Kosyari.
- 24 January 2021: 20,000 farmers’ vehicle march from Golfclub Maidan in Nashik to Mumbai, Maharashtra.
