= Biman Bose =

Indian politician (born 1940)

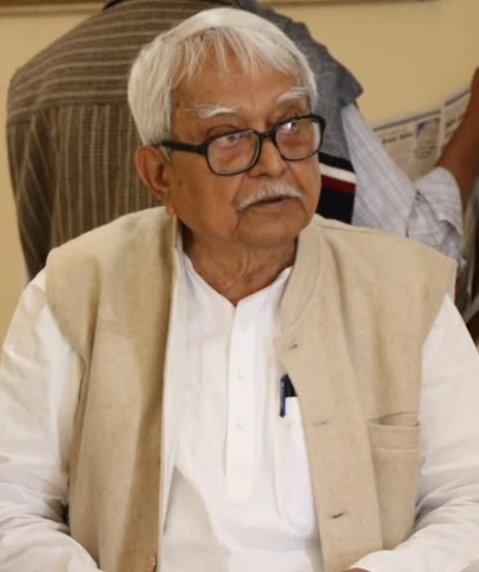

Member of the Politburo of the Communist Party of India (Marxist)
- In office 1998–2022
- Preceded by: Sunil Maitra
- Succeeded by: Ram Chandra Dome

Chairman of the Left Front
- Incumbent
- Assumed office 1998
- Preceded by: Sailen Dasgupta

West Bengal State Secretary of the CPI(M)
- In office 2006–2015
- Preceded by: Anil Biswas
- Succeeded by: Surjya Kanta Mishra

General Secretary of the Students' Federation of India
- In office 1970–1976
- Preceded by: Position established
- Succeeded by: Subhas Chakraborty

Personal details
- Born: 1 July 1940 (age 86) Calcutta, Bengal Presidency, British India
- Party: Communist Party of India (Marxist)
- Education: Maulana Azad College
- Occupation: Politician

Biman Bose (born 1 July 1940) is an Indian politician and a former State Secretary of the Communist Party of India (Marxist) West Bengal State Committee. He was later succeeded by Surya Kanta Mishra and remained a member of the Politburo of the party. Bose is the Chairman of the Left Front in West Bengal.

== Early life ==
Biman Bose was an alumnus of Maulana Azad College, under the University of Calcutta. During his educational experience, Bose was known to be involved in political and social activities. He participated in an election campaign during an assembly by-election in 1954 while he was still in school.

Though he was recommended for the Party in 1957, he was not granted a position until 1958 due to the minimum age requirement of 18 years. He participated in the movement against the Bengal–Bihar merger in 1956, as well as the food movement in 1959, and was imprisoned in 1958.

== Early political life ==
Bose was elected Secretary of the Bengal Provincial Students' Federation, Kolkata district, and vice-president of the BPSF in 1964. He continued his work as the Assistant Secretary of the Indo-Vietnam Solidarity Committee in the mid-1960s.

He was the first All India Secretary of the Students Federation of India in 1970 and continued in that position until 1976. He became a member of the West Bengal State Committee of the Communist Party of India (Marxist) in 1971 and a Secretariat member in 1978. He was mentored by Pramod Dasgupta.

== Political career ==
He was made a permanent invitee to the CPI(M) Central Committee in 1983 and was elected as a regular member in 1985. Promode Dasgupta asked Bose to contest from the Bankura Lok Sabha constituency in the 1980 Indian general election. However, he declined the offer and insisted on working in the organisation. Bose then selected Basudeb Acharia to contest from Bankura upon the instructions of Dasgupta.

He was elected as a member of the Politburo in 1998.

He played a key role in building and organising the party in several parts of West Bengal, especially undivided Medinipur, Bankura, and Puruliya districts.

He was also elected as the Chairman of the Left Front in 1998, after Sailen Dasgupta was relieved of the post due to health issues. This was the first time since 1977 that a person who was not the State Secretary of CPI(M) became Chairperson of the Left Front.

Bose was also elected as State Secretary of CPI(M) in March 2005 after Anil Biswas died suddenly. He served in the position until 2015, when Surjya Kanta Mishra succeeded him.

In 2022, he left the State Secretariat, State Committee, Central Committee, and the Politburo of CPI(M) in one go, adhering to the party's strict age limit. However, he is still serving as the Chairperson of the Left Front.

Later in 2022, he was made a special invitee to the Central and State Committees of CPI(M).
