= M. K. Pandhe =

Indian politician (1925-2011)

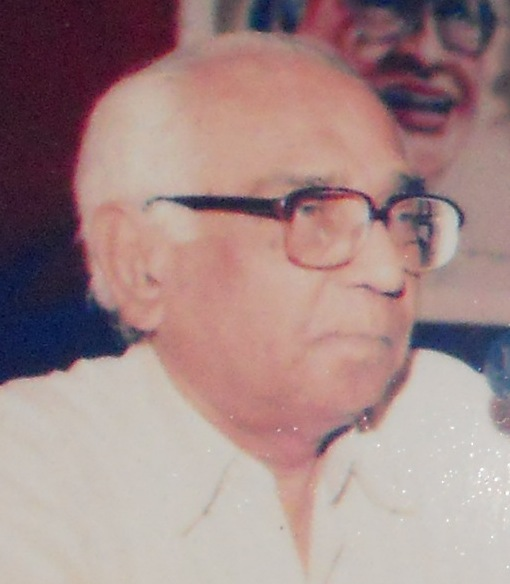
Pandhe addressing at CITU 9th state conference held in Kollam

Madhukar Kashinath Pandhe (11 July 1925 – 20 August 2011) was a Politburo member of the Communist Party of India (Marxist) from 2002 to 2011 and was also the General Secretary of the Centre of Indian Trade Unions (CITU), one of the largest trade unions in India.

== Early life ==
M.K. Pandhe was a brilliant student, who got scholarships throughout his studies, which covered his educational expenditure. When his parents were transferred to Solapur in 1939, where Pandhe's family stayed next to a textile mill, he for the first time got the opportunity to experience the problems of workers. At the age of 13, Pandhe got involved with the activities of the organization "Prakash Mandal", which tried to create awareness among people by writing political news on the roadside walls. Pandhe got master's degree from Pune University and then got a PhD in Politics and Economics. His Principal in Pune University, Prof. D.R. Gadgil inspired and supported him to become M.A and PhD. He was attracted to the left politics and became the Student Federation secretary of Sonapur.

== Communist and Trade Union Politics ==
In January 1944, Pandhe became a full-time Communist Party member. When Communist Party was banned, he worked in underground during 1948-1951 period for nearly 27 months. He was elected as the secretary of Goa Liberation Forum. In 1952 Pandhe became Joint Secretary of Lal Bawata Girni Kamgar Sabha (which was headed by R K Kum Khum who became Maharashtra Labour Minister later) with which Pandhe was associated from 1943. In 1958, he shifted his activity to the All India Trade Union Headquarters. In 1959, Pandhe visited Czechoslovakia for three weeks. Pandhe served as Director of NM Joshi School of Trade Union and was responsible for preparing its syllabus. When the Indian Communist Party split into CPI and CPI(M) in 1964, he stood with CPI(M). Later in 1966, he was elected as Secretary of AITUC. It is notable here that, When the Communist Party was split, CPI(M) initially chose not to form a separate Trade Union.

During China war, M.K. Pandhe went underground once again for 14 months from 1965 to 1966. He was elected as the secretary of CITU in 1990. He was elected to Polit Bureau of CPI(M) in its Party Congress held in Calcutta in 1998. He was elected as CITU President in 1999.

== Struggle Against Neo-Liberal Deviation ==
Dr. M.K.Pandhe was a dedicated Marxist–Leninist. He strove consistently to equip the working class movement with the ideology of socialism and to develop the political consciousness of the workers to enable them to discharge their revolutionary role in social transformation for a better world. He stood for Leftist Ideological Stands when the Neo-Liberal group led by Budhadeb Bhattacharya, Nirupam Sen (politician), Gautam Deb and Thomas Isaac got upper-hand in CPI(M) leadership and tried to reform CPI(M)'s economic policies in the line of Chinese Communist Party. His was the rare saner voice in CPI(M) who time and again warned its leadership about the folly of bowing down to the pressure of Neo-Liberal Politics. In 2009, M.K. Pandhe admitted that Budhadeb Government committed mistakes in Bengal. Pandhe refused to accept the Development Model put forward by various Institutions echoing the voice of International Finance Capital interests, and repeatedly pointed out that, it would be a mistake to go against the interest of poor farmers in West Bengal and to work in connivance with Corporate interests. However, it is pointed out that, CPM's new middle class leadership, paying little heed to Pandhe's suggestions led the CPI(M) to ruins. Pandhe also was supportive of the ideological struggles led by VS Achuthanandan in Kerala's CPI(M). It was widely perceived that, as CPI(M) top leadership is embroiled in bitter power struggle as the Bengali Neo-Liberal groups want to replace Prakash Karat with Sitaram Yechury, there was a likelihood of Dr. Pandhe emerging as a consensus General Secretary Candidate, in the Party Congress scheduled in April 2012. M.K. Pandhe also was one among the CITU leaders who proposed Prakash Karat to take over as General Secretary, in accordance with the Communist tradition that, General Secretary should be representing the Party Line, when Harkishen Singh Surjeet's proposal to participate in the Coalition Government at center was rejected by Central Committee of CPI(M). This move had the backing of Left Communist leaders like E.M.S. Namboodiripad, E. Balanandan and others. However Prakash Karat refused to take the mantle from Surjeet at that point. Nevertheless, Pandhe, as party spokesperson, on several occasions, shielded Bengal Govt from public criticisms.

== Contributions ==
Pandhe worked as Secretary of the AITUC in the 1960s, and remained an involved leader of the CITU. He remained involved in working class movements for the last three decades of his life.

M. K. Pandhe has got many feathers in his cap. He was the member of the Ramanujan Committee on Industrial Relations, and was the Vice chancellor of the National Safety Council Board. In 1979, Pandhe became the president of the Steel Workers Federation of India and in 1982, he was elected as the president of the All India Coal Workers Federation. Pandhe became a member of the National Shipping Board in 1984.

== Protagonist of Public Sector Industry ==
M K Pandhe as the leader of CITU and CPI(M) always argued for strengthening Public Sector in India. He had pointed out that the share of public sector steel producers in Indian market is slowly declining due to entry of more private players and questioned the policy of exporting two-thirds of the iron ore produced in India. He felt that strengthening the Public Sector is the way for create new jobs in the country. He had also criticised the various steps taken by the Air India management to favour the private sector, reducing in this process the market share of Air India in a planned manner. He pointed out that both Indian Airlines and Air India were running well prior to their merger but that the merged company has become sick due to government's pro-private sector policies.

== Death ==
He died at Ram Manohar Lohia Hospital, New Delhi at the age of 86 on 20 August 2011.
