= K. Varadarajan =

Indian politician (1946–2020)

Personal details
- Born: 4 October 1946
- Died: 16 May 2020 (aged 73) Karur, Tamilnadu
- Party: Communist Party of India (Marxist)

K. Varadarajan (October 4, 1946 – May 16, 2020) was a Politburo member of the Communist Party of India (Marxist) from Tamil Nadu state of India.

== Life ==
Varadharajan was born on 4 October 1946. He died at Karur, Tamil Nadu on 16 May 2020.

He had a diploma in civil engineering.

== Political career ==
=== Peasant Leader ===
Varadharajan was a peasant activist and leader of All India Kisan Sabha.

He gave leadership to numerous struggles of the Tamil Nadu Vivasayigal Sangham (or Tamil Nadu State Kisan Sabha) and took to organising the peasantry particularly in Trichy District.

- Elected as the Secretary of Trichy District Kisan Sabha in 1974.
- Elected as the Secretary of Tamil Nadu State Kisan Sabha in 1986
- Elected as the General Secretary of All India Kisan Sabha in 1998.

=== Communist Leader ===
Varadharajan became a member of CPI(M) in 1968.

- Elected as the Trichy District Secretary of CPI(M) in 1978.
- Elected to the Tamil Nadu State Committee of CPI(M) in 1972.
- Elected to the State Secretariat of CPI(M) in 1986.
- Elected to the Central Committee of CPI(M) in 1998.
- Elected to the Central Secretariat of CPI(M) in 2002.
- Elected to the Polit Bureau of CPI(M) in 2005.

During the Emergency he was underground from 1975 to 1977.

He was the All India Vice President of AIKS and member of the Central Committee of the CPI-M till his death.
