= Ganashakti =

Indian newspaper

- Type: Daily newspaper
- Format: Broadsheet
- Owner(s): Ganashakti Trust
- Editor: Samik Lahiri
- Founded: January 3, 1967
- Political alignment: Left-wing
- Language: Bengali
- Headquarters: Kolkata, West Bengal, India
- Country: India
- Sister newspapers: Deshabhimani, People's Democracy, Daily Desher Katha, Prajasakti, Theekkathir
- Website: ganashakti.com

Ganashakti Patrika (1967–present) is an Indian Bengali daily newspaper published from Kolkata, West Bengal, India. The paper is an organ of the Communist Party of India (Marxist) West Bengal State Committee.

== History ==
It first appeared as a fortnightly on 3 January 1967 and then it started as an evening daily for quite some time and finally converted into a full-fledged daily newspaper. Presently Ganashakti has 3 editions in Kolkata, Durgapur and Siliguri having a daily circulation of less than 7,50,000. One of its founders was Ashok Gupta or Ramendranath Bhattacharya, who fought in Goa liberation movement and was a prominent Marxist leader of West Bengal.

The principal catalyst behind transformation of Ganashakti was Saroj Mukherjee, a freedom fighter and CPI(M)'s state secretary during the 1980s. After Mukherjee's death his efforts were carried on by Anil Biswas. Ganashakti reached its highest circulation at the time of Biswas's editorship. Ganashakti Trust is the owner of the Ganashakti newspaper. Present the paper is running by a trust and the editor is Samik Lahiri.
