= Kanak Mukherjee =

Indian politician (1921–2005)

- কনক মুখোপাধ্যায়
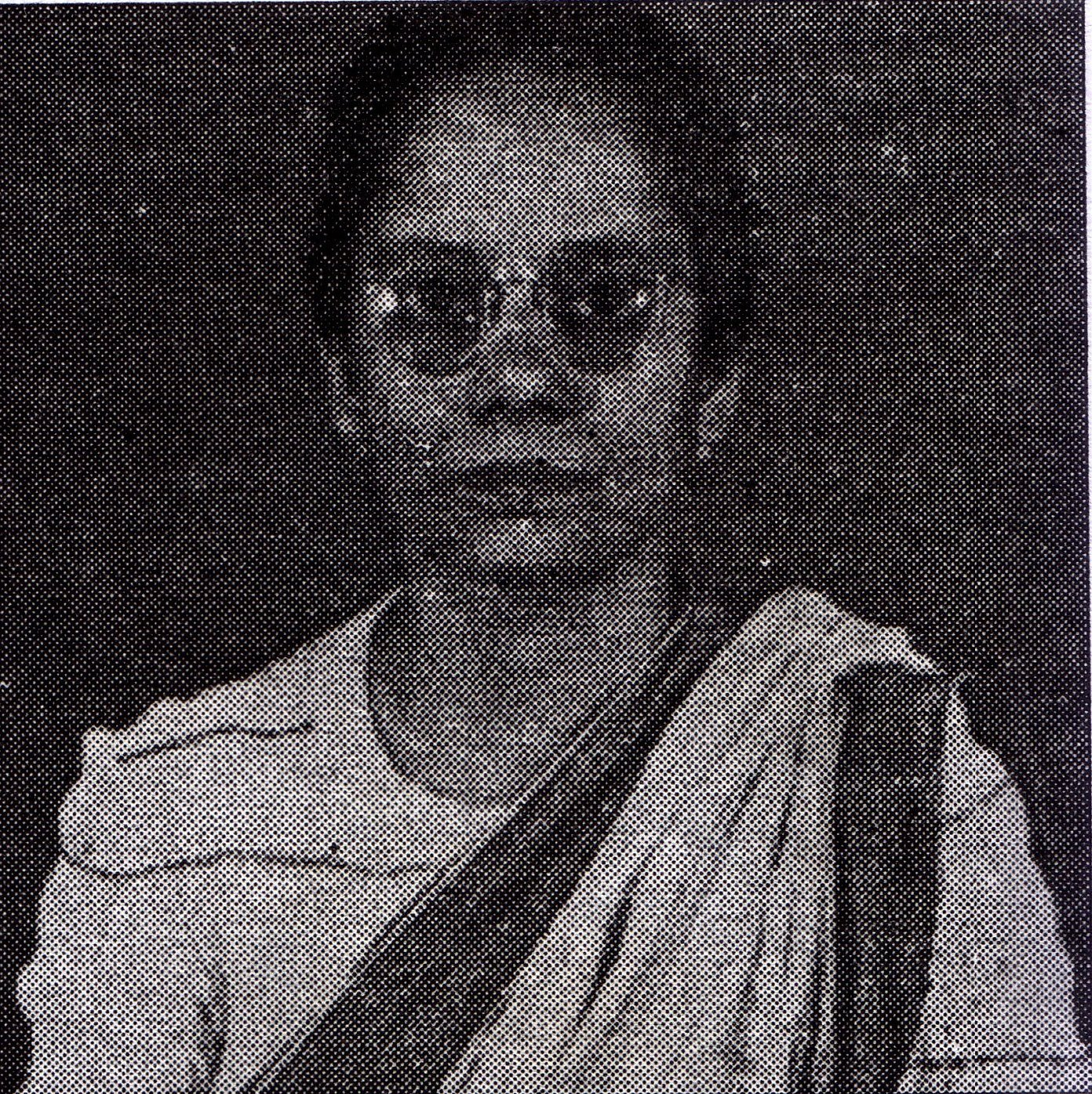

Personal details
- Born: Kanak Dasgupta; 30 December 1921 Jessore, Bengal Presidency, British India
- Died: 9 March 2005 (aged 83) Kolkata, West Bengal, India
- Citizenship: Indian
- Party: Communist Party of India (Marxist)
- Other political affiliations: All India Democratic Women's Association
- Spouse: Saroj Mukherjee

Kanak Mukherjee (née Dasgupta; 1921 – 2005) was a communist and is regarded as a pioneer of the women's movement in West Bengal. She was a Central Committee member of Communist Party of India (Marxist). She was the founder of the All India Democratic Women's Association. She also contributed in the field of literature.

== Early life ==
Kanak Mukherjee was born in December 1921 in Jessore district of undivided India. Satish Chandra Dasgupta, her father was an eminent lawyer. Her mother was Molina Devi. She passed matriculation examination in 1937, came to Calcutta and took admission in the Bethune College under the University of Calcutta. Already since studying in class 8, she had come in contact with communist leaders in Jessore like Krishna Binod Ray, Sukumar Mitra, Shantimoy Ghosh. After coming to Calcutta she worked in All India Students Federation. She joined Communist Party of India in 1938.

== Later life ==
She was the Convener of Bengal Women's Sub-Committee of CPI. When the party was divided in 1964, she joined CPI(M). She was a member of CPI(M) West Bengal State Committee from 1978 to 1998 and a member of CPI(M) Central Committee from 1989 to 1998. In 1943, she joined the first Party Congress of CPI at Bombay as a representative. She worked as a Party Whole-timer for some time. In 1941 Kanak Dasgupta married Saroj Mukherjee who was also a Communist leader. She was elected twice (in 1978 and 1984) to the Rajya Sabha (upper house of Indian Parliament) from 1978 to 1990.

In 1942-43 famine in Bengal, she worked as a leader of the Bangiyo Mahila Atmaraksha Samity. At the same time she became an activist of women's movement. Later she became a leader of the Ganatantrik Mahila Samity, she also helped to found this organization. From 1957 to 1967, she was the editor of "Ghare-Baire" magazine. In 1968, she was the founder-editor of "Eksathe" magazine.

She graduated with B.A. degree and taught in a school for sometime. From 1967 to 1981, she was a Professor of English in Calcutta Women's College. In 1998 she was awarded the title of "Bhubanmohini Dasi" award by Calcutta University for her contribution in the field of literature.

She died in Kolkata after being ill for days on 9 March 2005.

== See also ==
- Saroj Mukherjee
- Communist Party of India (Marxist)
