= S. Ramachandran Pillai =

Indian politician

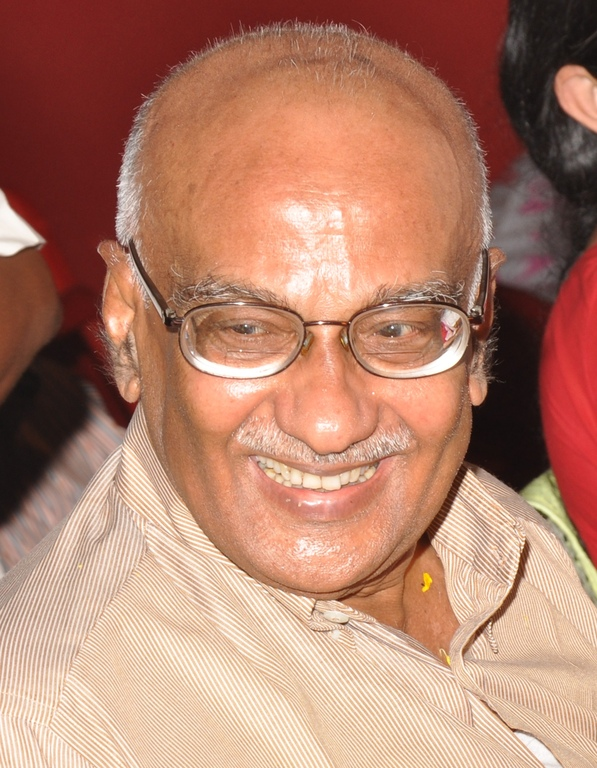

Member of Parliament, Rajya Sabha
- In office 22 April 1991 – 21 April 1997
- Constituency: Kerala
- In office 22 April 1997 – 21 April 2003
- Constituency: Kerala

Personal details
- Born: 7 February 1938 (age 88) Alappuzha, Travancore, British India
- Citizenship: Indian
- Party: Communist Party of India (Marxist)
- Spouse: Rethnamma
- Children: 3
- Education: BA, LLB
- Occupation: Politician

S. Ramachandran Pillai (born 7 February 1938) popularly known as SRP, is an Indian politician from Kerala. He is a former Politburo member of the Communist Party of India (Marxist). He is the vice president and a former General Secretary of All India Kisan Sabha (Peasants Union). He has been imprisoned due to his political work, including during the Emergency 1975–1976.

== Education and early life ==
He is from Alappuzha. He completed a BA from SD College, Alappuzha and BA BL from the Law Colleges of Thiruvananthapuram and Ernakulam.

== Political career ==
. He joined the Communist Party in 1956. He was elevated to General Secretary of the Kerala Socialist Youth Federation (the youth wing of CPI(M) in Kerala at that time) from 1968 to 1974. He was the Chief Editor of the Malayalam daily organ of CPI(M), Deshabhimani, from 1987 to 1991. SRP has represented CPI(M) in the Rajya Sabha twice, elected in 1991 and 1997.He contested the 1971 Lok Sabha election from the then Mavelikkara Lok Sabha constituency against R. Balakrishna Pillai, the Congress–Kerala Congress alliance candidate and former minister, and was defeated by a margin of 55,527 votes. He was a Politburo member of the Communist Party of India (Marxist) from 1992 to 2022.

== Personal life ==
He married Rethnamma in 1966. They have three children. Rethnamma died in 2006. His base of operation is Delhi, and he travels extensively across the country as a part of his political work.
