= Sailen Dasgupta =

Indian politician (1944–2006)

Member of Polit Bureau, Communist Party of India (Marxist)
- In office 1991–2001

West Bengal State Secretary of the CPI(M)
- In office 1990–1998
- Preceded by: Saroj Mukherjee
- Succeeded by: Anil Biswas

Chairman of Left Front
- In office 1990–1998
- Preceded by: Saroj Mukherjee
- Succeeded by: Biman Bose

Personal details
- Born: 24 October 1920; Barisal, Bengal Presidency, British India (now in Bangladesh)
- Died: 10 July 2001 (aged 80–81); Mumbai, Maharashtra, India
- Political party: Communist Party of India (Marxist)
- Occupation: Politician

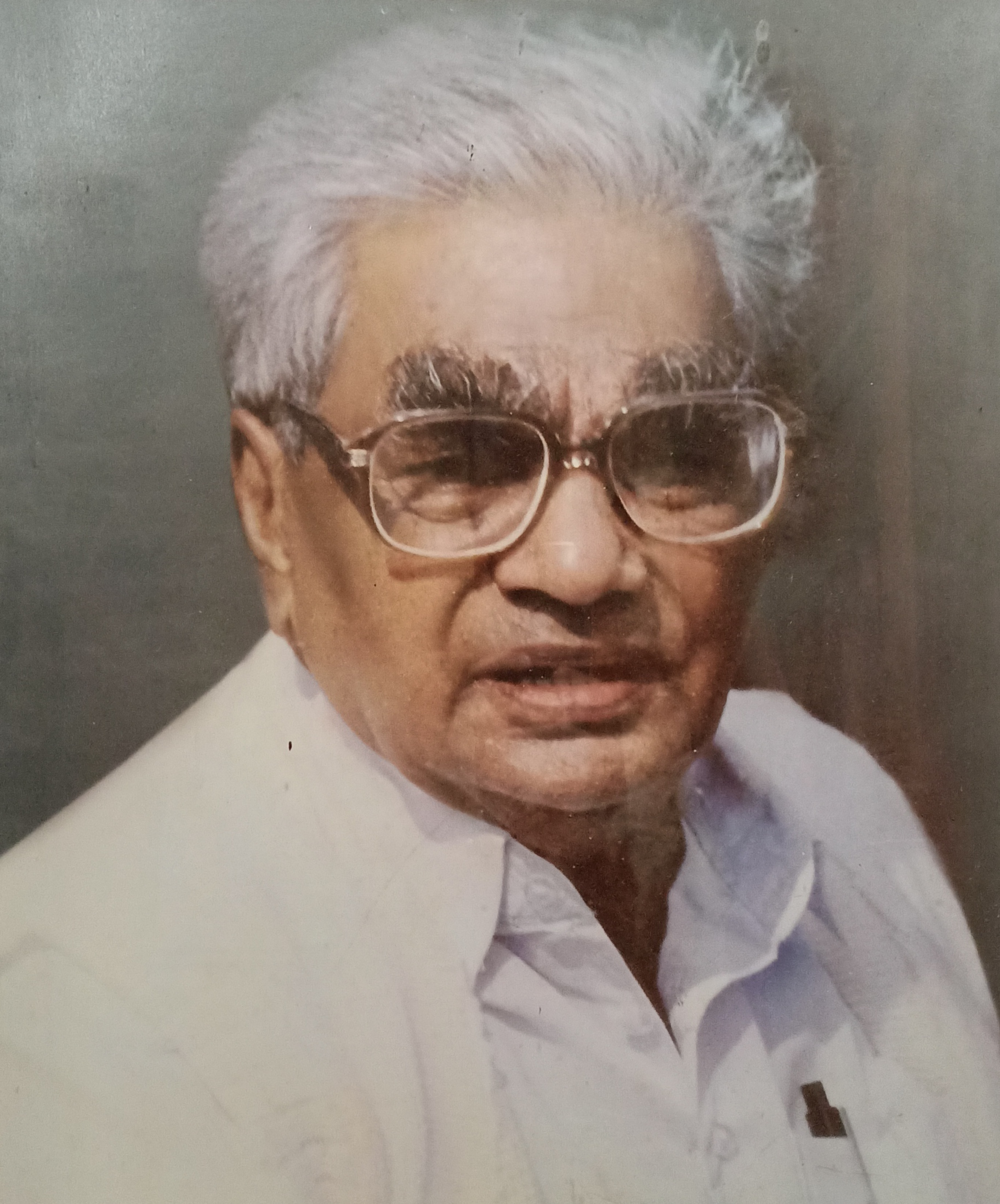

Sailen Dasgupta (24 October 1920 – 10 July 2001), was an Indian communist politician. He was the secretary of the West Bengal State Committee of Communist Party of India (Marxist) between 1990 and 1998 and member of the party's politburo beginning in 1992 until his death in 2001.

== Early life ==
Dasgupta was born on 24 October, 1920 in the Barisal district in undivided Bengal and completed his matriculation in 1938.

== Politics ==
Dasgupta joined CPI(M) in 1939. He was active in the party throughout the decades and because Secretary of the State Committee in 1990; He was reelected in 1991, 1995 and 1998. He resigned in late 1998 owing to ill-health and old age.

He was also elected as the chairperson of Left Front in West Bengal in 1990. He was also elected to the Central Committee in 1990 and to the Polit Bureau in 1991.

== Death ==
Dasgupta died in Mumbai on 10 July, 2001.
