= Tapan Sen =

Indian politician

Tapan Kumar Sen
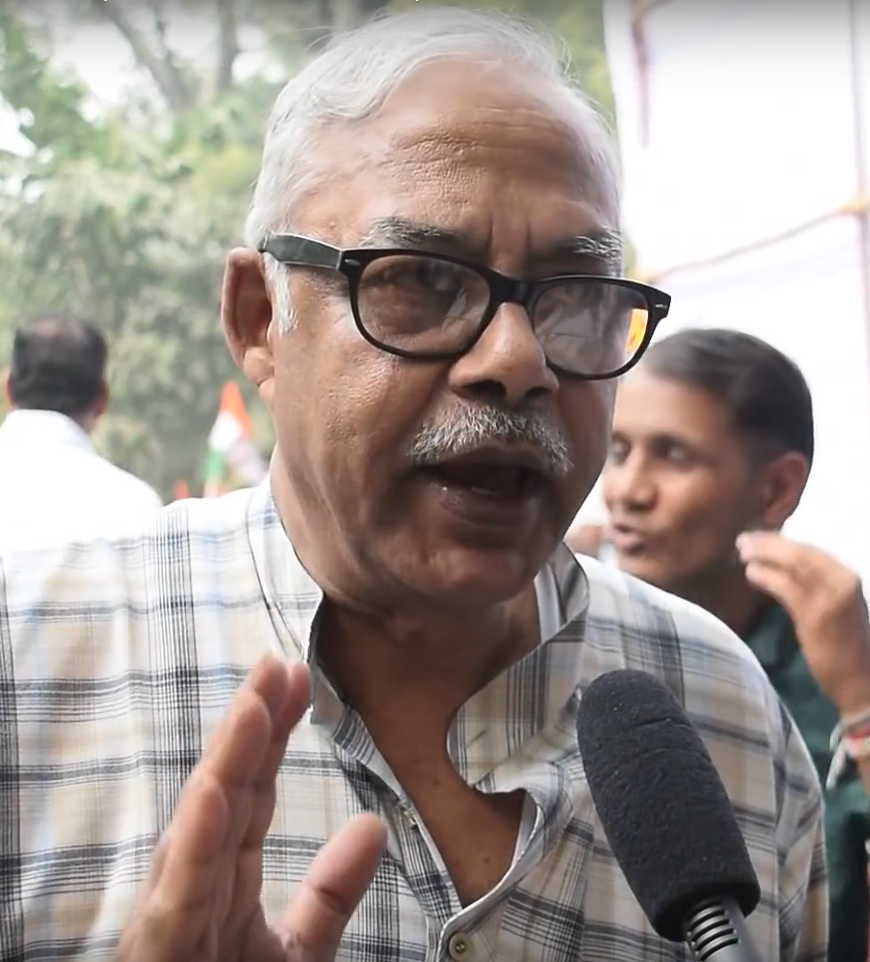

General Secretary, CITU
- Incumbent
- Assumed office 2013

Member of the Politburo of the Communist Party of India (Marxist)
- Incumbent
- Assumed office April 2018

MP of Rajya Sabha for West Bengal
- In office 2006–2018
- Preceded by: Mohammed Amin
- Succeeded by: Abhishek Manu Singhvi
- Constituency: West Bengal

Personal details
- Born: 2 October 1951 (age 75) Kolkata, West Bengal
- Party: Communist Party of India (Marxist)
- Education: University of Calcutta
- Profession: Politician, Trade Unionist, Social worker

Tapan Kumar Sen is a politician from the Communist Party of India (Marxist) and a former Member of the Parliament of India representing West Bengal in the Rajya Sabha, the upper house of the Indian Parliament.

== Electoral History ==
=== Rajya Sabha ===
Position	Party	Constituency	From	To	Tenure
Member of Parliament, Rajya Sabha (1st Term)	CPI(M)	West Bengal	3 April 2006	2 April 2012	5 years, 365 days
Member of Parliament, Rajya Sabha (2nd Term)	CPI(M)	West Bengal	3 April 2012	2 April 2018	5 years, 364 days
