= Samar Mukherjee (Howrah politician) =

Indian politician

- সমর মুখোপাধ্যায়

Member of Polit Bureau, Communist Party of India (Marxist)
- In office 1978–1992

General Secretary of CITU
- In office 1983–1991

Member of the Parliament, Lok Sabha
- In office 1971–1984
- Constituency: Howrah

Member of the Rajya Sabha
- In office 1986–1993

Personal details
- Born: 7 November 1913 Amta, British India
- Died: 18 July 2013 (aged 99) Kolkata, India
- Occupation: Communist Leader

Samar Mukherjee (7 November 1913 – 18 July 2013) was an Indian Communist leader who served as member of the Lok Sabha, the lower house of the Parliament of India for the Howrah constituency for three consecutive terms, and as a member of the Rajya Sabha. He was a member of the Polit Bureau, member of the Central Committee of Communist Party of India (Marxist) and he was also the General Secretary of Centre of Indian Trade Unions (CITU).

== Early life ==
Mukherjee was born to Sachindralal Mukherjee and Golapsundari Devi in a village near Amta in Howrah district on 7 November 1913. On 3 February 1928, the Indian Statutory Commission, headed by Sir John Simon arrived at Bombay, and was greeted by nationwide protests with black flags, and nationwide hartal was observed. Samar, who was then only a Class VII student, became a part of the students and teachers, who had convened a joint hartal in the school. In March 1930, he joined the Civil Disobedience Movement at the call of Mahatma Gandhi, and conducted picketing in front of the wine shops, and against wearing foreign clothes. On 7 July 1930 he joined and conducted a three-and-half months' long students strike in Pitambar High School, as part of the school-college boycott call given by the Indian National Congress. After the successful strike, he was rusticated from the school for participating in the strike. In the same year, he was imprisoned under a false libel suit filed by police under Section 107, Indian Penal Code. After being imprisoned for 6 months, he was set free. In March, 1931 the case was withdrawn following the Gandhi–Irwin Pact.

== Political Career ==
=== Early activism and the Indian National Congress (1932–1939) ===
In 1932, Mukherjee got admitted to the Bowbazaar High School in the 10th Standard, and passed the Matriculation next year. In 1932, he was made the Secretary of the Amta Congress Committee, and later of the Uluberia Provincial Congress Committee. He was subsequently inducted into the Howrah District Committee of the Indian National Congress.

A pivotal shift occurred in 1936 when Mukherjee met Bimal Roy, a Communist leader from Rangpur District, who was then under house arrest in Amta. By 1938, Samar became the President of Howrah District Committee of the All India Students' Federation (AISF). In 1939, he also attended a Conference of the All India Kisan Sabha at Panchla in Howrah as a delegate.

=== Transition to Communism and the Independence Era (1940–1947) ===
In 1940, he earned the membership of the Communist Party of India, and left his home to become a whole timer. He was again arrested for organizing peasant movement in Howrah district. He carried a book of historical and dialectical materialism at the time of arrest. He became the Convenor of the Communist Consolidation of the Dum Dum Jail.

Following his release three months later, he relocated to Amta under the pseudonym "Mani". In 1942, he became the first Secretary of the Howrah District Committee of the CPI. In 1943, he was a delegate in the 1st Party Congress of CPI in Bombay. In 1946, he took an active part in anti-riot campaigning, and was attacked by both Hindu and Muslim rioters.

=== Post-Independence and Party Split (1948–1964) ===
In 1948, the Indian National Congress government declared CPI as illegal, and Samar was yet again arrested. Upon release, he concentrated organizing movement in Howrah district. He even had to jump off a running train at Santragachi railway station to evade arrest.

In 1953, he was inducted as a member of the West Bengal State Council (Rajya Parishad) of the CPI. He also became associated with the United Central Refugee Council (UCRC). In 1956, he took an active part in increasing the circulation of Swadhinata, the party's state mouthpiece. In the 1957 Assembly Elections, Mukherjee contested from Howrah North, defeating the sitting Speaker of the Assembly, Shaila Mukherjee.

In 1959, he was elected Secretary of the UCRC, playing a major role in refugee rehabilitation. At the 1961 Bardhaman conference, he was elected to the CPI State Secretariat. During the Sino-Indian War of 1962, he evaded arrest warrants by scaling the back walls of his Amta home. During this period, he served as the Secretary of the Underground State Committee for the Marxist-Leninist fraction of the party using the pseudonym "Prithwiraj."

As Swadhinata remained under the control of the party's revisionist section, Mukherjee converted the Marxist periodical Howrah Hitoishee into Deshhitoishee, which was first published on 16 August 1963. On 22 April 1964, he helped found an Institute of Marxism–Leninism. He was arrested shortly before the 7th Party Congress in 1964, following the arrests of leaders like Muzaffar Ahmed, Hare Krishna Konar and Promode Dasgupta.

=== Leadership in CPI(M) and Trade Unions (1966–1993) ===
Following his release in May 1966, Mukherjee became a member of the Central Committee of the newly formed Communist Party of India (Marxist). Using the pseudonym "Ashok Mukherjee," he wrote extensively in Deshhitoishee against revisionist trends.

In 1970, he became a member of the Working Committee of the newly formed Centre of Indian Trade Unions (CITU). That same year, he represented the CPI(M) at the 5th Party Congress of the Workers' Party of Korea.

=== Parliamentary Career ===
- 1971: Elected to the 5th Lok Sabha from Howrah.
- 1974: Acted as a mainstay for railway workers during the historic Railway Strike, delivering a notable speech in their support.
- 1977: Re-elected to the 6th Lok Sabha from Howrah; joined the International Peace Conference in Paris and served as the leader of the CPI(M) group in the Lok Sabha until 1984.
- 1986–1993: Served two terms in the Rajya Sabha, representing the demands of workers and peasants.

=== Party Roles ===
Mukherjee was elected to the Polit Bureau of the CPI(M) in 1978. In January 1992, at the 14th Party Congress in Madras, he was elected Chairman of the Central Control Commission.

His international delegations included representing the CPI(M) at the 6th Congress of the Workers' Party of Korea (1980) with M. Basavapunniah and representing CITU at the 10th Congress of the World Federation of Trade Unions at Havana (1982). He served as the General Secretary of CITU from 1983 to 1991. In 1985, he visited Afghanistan as part of the CPI(M) delegation invited by the People's Democratic Party of Afghanistan, and held discussion with revolutionary leader Babrak Karmal.

== Death ==
He died on 18 July 2013 at Kolkata, after being admitted to the hospital the day before.
