= Centre of Indian Trade Unions =

Trade union in India

Coordinates: 28°37′46.5″N 77°14′18.4″E

CITU
- Centre of Indian Trade Unions
- Abbreviation: CITU
- Founded: 1970; 56 years ago
- Headquarters: New Delhi, India
- Location: India
- Members: ▲6,200,000
- President: Sudip Dutta
- General Secretary: Elamaram Kareem
- Treasurer: Mandhadapu Saibabu
- Affiliations: WFTU
- Website: citucentre.org

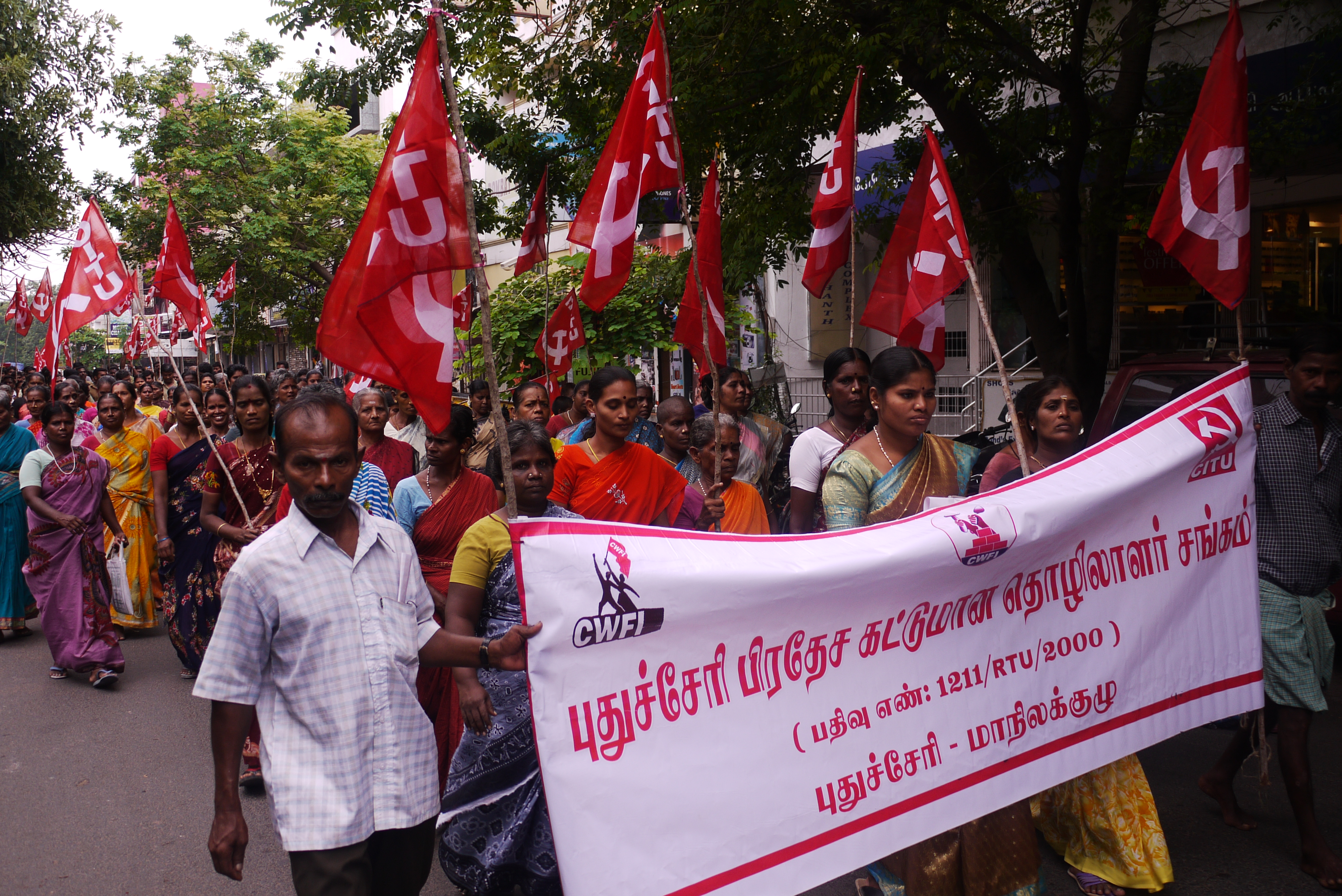
Workers of the Construction Workers Federation of India, an affiliate of CITU marching

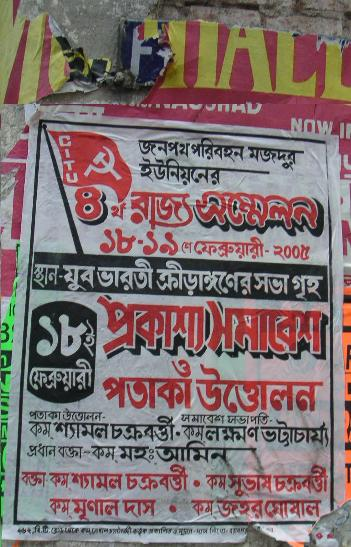
4th CITU West Bengal state conference poster

The Centre of Indian Trade Unions (CITU) is a communist trade union in India. It is associated with the Communist Party of India (Marxist). It has presence mostly in the Indian state of Tripura, West Bengal, Keralam, Tamil Nadu, Karnataka and Andhra Pradesh.

CITU has an estimated membership of 6,200,000 in 2023.

Tapan Sen is the General Secretary and K. Hemalata is the president of CITU. Hemalata was the first woman president of CITU, who was elected after A. K. Padmanabhan. It runs a monthly organ named WORKING CLASS.

CITU is affiliated to the World Federation of Trade Unions. At present the multiple industrial federations are functioning at the national level with CITU. .

It is also affiliated with AIITEU, workers union for IT/ITES employees in India.

== History of CITU Conferences ==
Dates	Details	President	General Secretary
28-30 May 1970	Foundation Conference Kolkata	B. T. Ranadive	P. Ramamurthi
18-22 Apr, 1973	2nd CITU Conference Ernakulam	B. T. Ranadive	P. Ramamurthi
21-25 May 1975	3rd CITU Conference Mumbai	B. T. Ranadive	P. Ramamurthi
11-15 Apr, 1979	4th CITU Conference Chennai	B. T. Ranadive	P. Ramamurthi
13-17 Apr, 1983	5th CITU Conference Kanpur	B. T. Ranadive	Samar Mukherjee
18-22 May 1987	6th CITU Conference Mumbai	B. T. Ranadive	Samar Mukherjee
13-17 Feb, 1991	7th CITU Conference Kolkata	E. Balanandan	M. K. Pandhe
3-7 Mar, 1994	8th CITU Conference Patna	E. Balanandan	M. K. Pandhe
21-26 Apr, 1997	9th CITU Conference Kochi	E. Balanandan	M. K. Pandhe
27-30 Dec, 2000	10th CITU Conference Hyderabad	E. Balanandan	M. K. Pandhe
9-14 Dec, 2003	11th CITU Conference Chennai	M. K. Pandhe	Chittabrata Majumdar
17-21 Jan, 2007	12th CITU Conference Bengaluru	M. K. Pandhe	Chittabrata Majumdar
17-21 Mar, 2010	13th CITU Conference Chandigarh	A.K. Padmanabhan	Tapan Sen
4-8 Apr, 2013	14th CITU Conference Kannur	A.K. Padmanabhan	Tapan Sen
26-30 Nov, 2016	15th CITU Conference Puri	K. Hemalata	Tapan Sen
23-27 Jan, 2020	16th CITU Conference Chennai	K. Hemalata	Tapan Sen
18-22 Jan, 2023	17th CITU Conference Bengaluru	K. Hemalata	Tapan Sen
2025 Dec 31 - 2026 Jan 04	18th CITU Conference Visakhapatnam	Sudip Dutta	Elamaram Kareem
