= Makineni Basavapunnaiah =

Indian politician (1914–1992)

Member of Parliament, Rajya Sabha
- In office 3 April 1952 – 2 April 1966

Personal details
- Born: 14 December 1914; Toorpupalem, Guntur district, British India
- Died: 12 April 1992 (aged 77); New Delhi, India
- Political party: Communist Party of India (Marxist)
- Spouse: Jagadamba
- Children: Jaswant Mohan
- Known for: Co-founder of Communist Party of India (Marxist)

Makineni Basavapunnaiah (Telugu: మాకినేని బసవపున్నయ్య; 14 December 1914 – 12 April 1992) was an Indian Communist leader who was a member of first Politburo of the Communist Party of India (Marxist) (CPI (M)). He was also the editor of the central organ of CPI (M), People's Democracy magazine. He was a member of the Rajya Sabha for 14 years from 3 April 1952 to 2 April 1966.

== Biography ==
He was born to Shri Venkatappaiah in Toorpupalem village near Repalle in Guntur district, Andhra Pradesh. He studied in his village, Repalle and Machilipatnam. He has graduated from Andhra Christian College, Guntur in 1936.

Makineni Basavapunnaiah was influenced by the upsurge in the Indian Independence Movement in the early 1930s. He grew increasingly disillusioned by the policies of the then Congress leadership. In 1934 he joined the Communist Party of India.

Within the Communist Party of India (CPI), he began working as a district level activist in Guntur, Andhra Pradesh. In 1943 he was elected to the Andhra Pradesh Provincial Committee of the CPI and its secretariat. Basavapunnaiah participated in the Telangana Rebellion. At the Second Congress of the CPI in 1948, he was elected to the Central Committee of the party. In June 1950, was inducted into the party politburo. He was one among the four member Indian Communist delegation who met Joseph Stalin clandestinely in 1950 to receive his advice on whether to continue the Telangana Rebellion or not.

In 1957, he represented the CPI at the international conference of communist parties in Moscow, USSR.

When the CPI was divided into two in 1964, he became a politburo member of the Communist Party of India (Marxist), the splinter group of the Communist Party of India.

Basavapunnaiah died in New Delhi in 1992.
