= Lok Lahar =

Indian newspaper

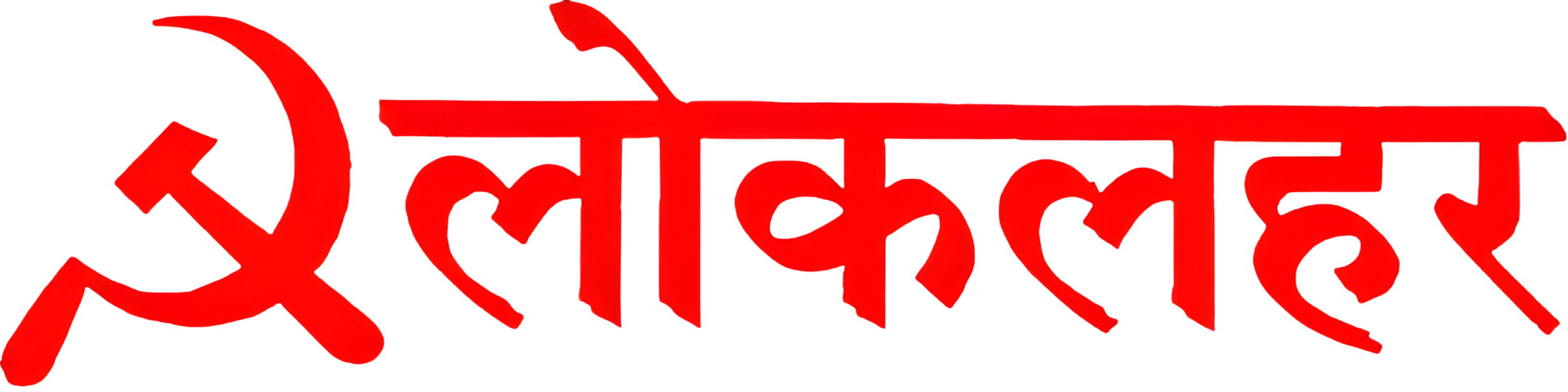
- Type: Daily newspaper
- Format: Broadsheet
- Editor: Rajendra Sharma
- Political alignment: Communism; Marxism-Leninism
- Language: Hindi
- Headquarters: New Delhi, Delhi, India
- Country: India
- Website: loklahar.in

Lok Lahar is an Indian Hindi daily newspaper published from New Delhi, Delhi, India. This paper is the central organ of the Communist Party of India (Marxist) along with People's Democracy.

Rajendra Sharma is the editor of Lok Lahar newspaper.
