= Penumalli Madhu =

Indian politician

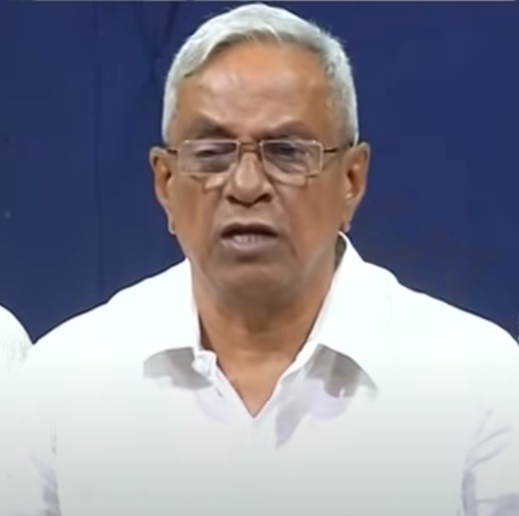
- Madhu in a press meet

Former Secretary of the Communist Party of India (Marxist), Andhra Pradesh State Council
- Succeeded by: V. Srinivasa Rao

Member of Parliament, Rajya Sabha
- In office 2004–2010
- Succeeded by: Gundu Sudha Rani
- Constituency: Andhra Pradesh

Personal details
- Party: Communist Party of India (Marxist)

Penumalli Madhu is a politician from Communist Party of India (Marxist). He was CPI(M) Andhra Pradesh state secretary. He is a former Member of the Parliament of India who represented Andhra Pradesh in the Rajya Sabha, the upper house of the Indian Parliament.
