= Kshetrimayum Santa =

Indian politician

Secretary of Communist Party of India (Marxist), Manipur
- Incumbent
- Assumed office 26 November 2017
- Preceded by: Sarat Salam

Convenor of Indian National Developmental Inclusive Alliance, Manipur
- Incumbent
- Assumed office 2023

Personal details
- Party: Communist Party of India (Marxist)
- Occupation: Politician

Kshetrimayum Santa is an Indian communist politician from Manipur. He is the secretary of Manipur state committee of Communist Party of India (Marxist). He was first elected to the post on 26 November 2017 and got reelected in the two subsequent state conferences. He also serves as the convenor of INDIA bloc in Manipur. Under his leadership, INDIA bloc managed to win both Lok Sabha seats in Manipur in 2024 Indian general election.

== Manipur violence ==
He led the group of leaders from CPI(M), CPI, RSP and AIFB which met Manipur Governor Anusuiya Uikey on 8 May 2023 to make suggestions in bid to restore normalcy in state.
