= Kisan Mazdoor =

Indian newspaper

Kisan Mazdoor (Urdu: کسان مزدور, 'Peasant-Worker') is an Urdu language (Hindi: किसान-मजदूर), weekly newspaper, published by the Communist Party of India (Marxist) from Kolkata.

Kisan Mazdoor was founded in May 1968 as a progressive Urdu weekly, by people close to CPI(M). As of 1969 it had a circulation of around 2,000. Mohammed Amin, parliamentarian and West Bengal Minister of Transport, served as editor of Kisan Mazdoor 1968–1986.

As of 1983 Kisan Mazdoor had its offices at Chandni Chowk, but later shifted to the CPI(M) state headquarters at Alimuddin Street.

Around 2014 the publication claimed a circulation of 15,940.
