= Communist Party of India (Marxist) =

Political party

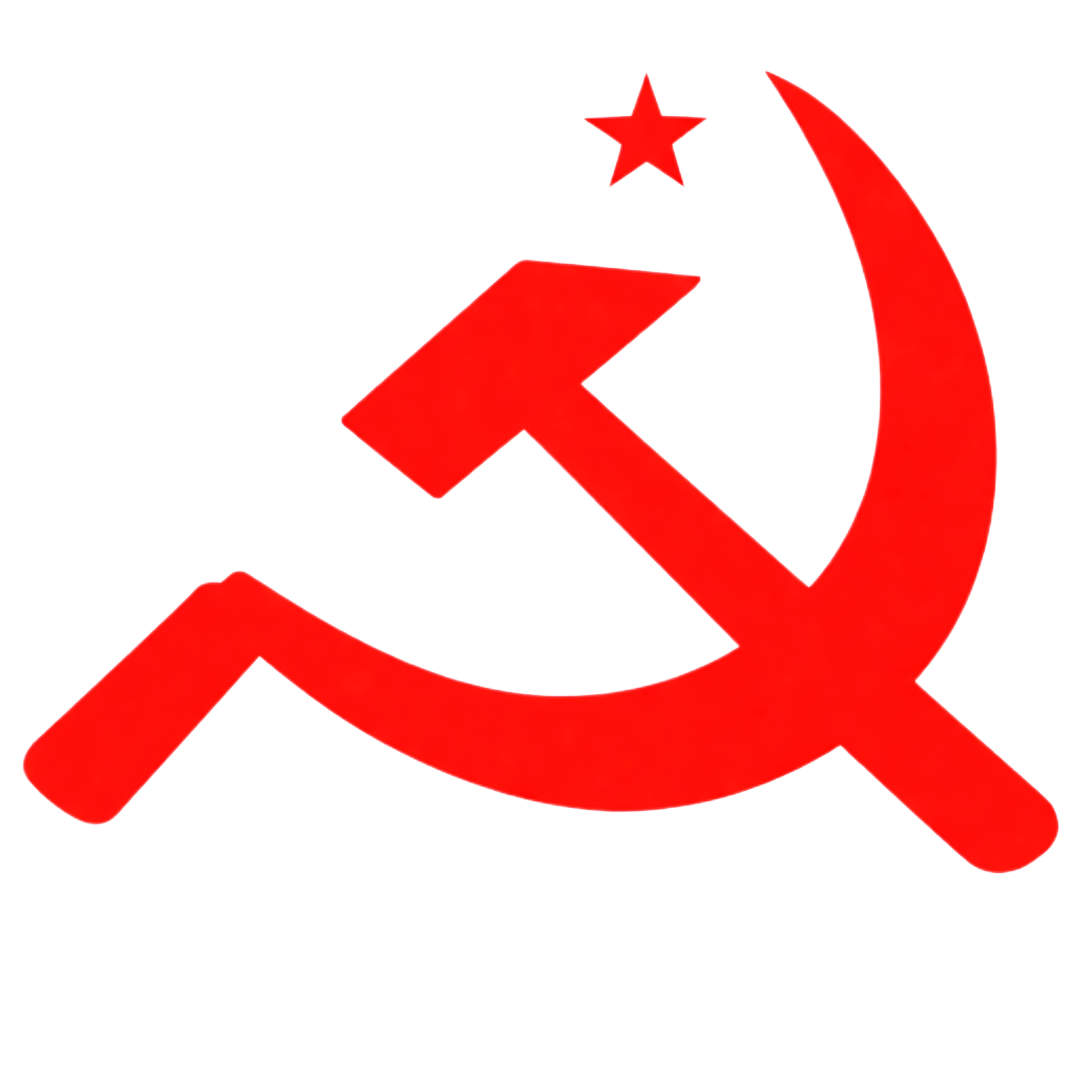
- Abbreviation: CPI(M), CPIM, CPM
- General Secretary: M. A. Baby
- Presidium: Politburo
- Rajya Sabha Leader: John Brittas
- Lok Sabha Leader: K Radhakrishnan
- Founder: List: P. Ramamurthi; M. Basavapunnaiah; E. M. S. Namboodiripad; H. S. Surjeet; Promode Dasgupta; Jyoti Basu; H. K. Konar; P. Sundarayya; B. T. Ranadive; A. K. Gopalan
- Founded: 7 November 1964; 62 years ago
- Split from: Communist Party of India
- Headquarters: A. K. Gopalan Bhawan, 27–29, Bhai Vir Singh Marg, New Delhi–110 001
- Newspaper: People's Democracy (English); Loklahar (Hindi); Ganashakti (Bengali); Daily Desher Katha (Bengali); Deshabhimani (Malayalam); Theekkathir (Tamil); Prajasakti (Telugu); Nava Telangana (Telugu); Kisan Mazdoor (Urdu)
- Student wing: Students' Federation of India; Tribal Students Union
- Youth wing: Democratic Youth Federation of India; Tribal Youth Federation
- Women's wing: All India Democratic Women's Association
- Labour wing: Centre of Indian Trade Unions
- Peasant's wing: All India Kisan Sabha; All India Agricultural Workers Union
- Membership: ▲1,019,009 (2024)
- Ideology: Communism; Marxism–Leninism; Socialism; Secularism
- Political position: Left-wing
- International affiliation: IMCWP
- Colours: Red
- ECI status: National Party
- Alliance: Alliances: INDIA (National); LDF (Kerala); LF (Tripura); LF (West Bengal); ASM (Assam); SDF (Tripura); LF+ (West Bengal); LF (Tamil Nadu); MGB (Bihar); MVA (Maharashtra); SP+ (Uttar Pradesh); MPSA (Manipur)
- Seats in Rajya Sabha: 3 / 245
- Seats in Lok Sabha: 4 / 543
- Seats in State legislatures: 43 / 4,036 (Total) List 26 / 140 (Kerala) 10 / 60 (Tripura) 2 / 234 (Tamil Nadu) 1 / 294 (West Bengal) 1 / 243 (Bihar) 1 / 90 (Jammu & Kashmir) 1 / 147 (Odisha) 1 / 288 (Maharashtra)
- Number of states and union territories in government: 1 / 31

Election symbol
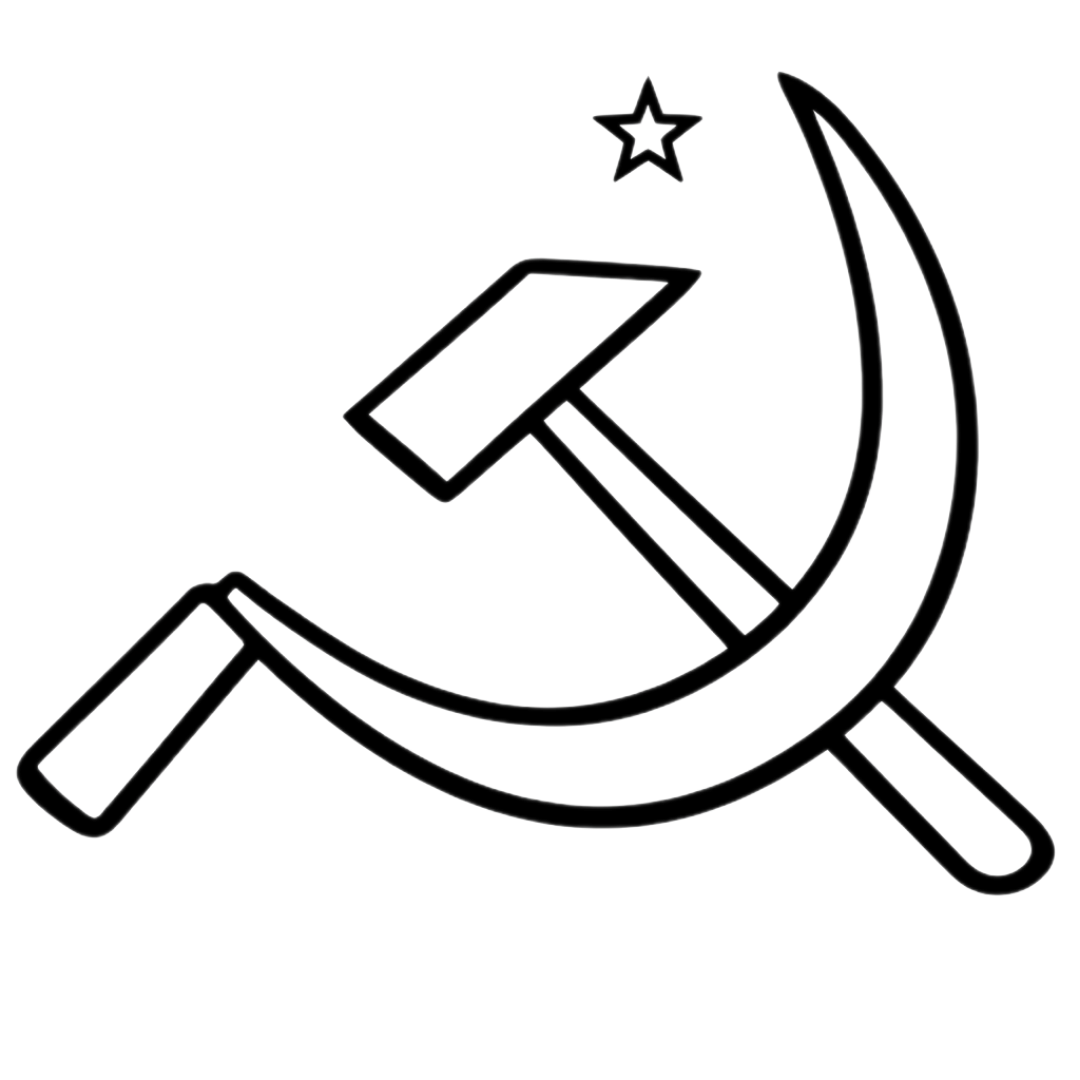
- Hammer Sickle and Star

Party flag

Website
- cpim.org

The Communist Party of India (Marxist) (abbr. CPI(M)) is a Marxist–Leninist political party in India. It is the largest communist party in India in terms of membership and electoral seats, and one of the six national parties of India. The party was founded through a splitting from the Communist Party of India in 1964; the CPI(M) quickly became the dominant faction.

The 34 years of CPI(M)-led Left Front rule in West Bengal was the longest-serving democratically elected communist-led government in the world. It emerged as the third-largest party of the parliament in the 2004 national election. Currently, CPI(M) has representation in the legislative assemblies of eight states.

The All-India Party Congress is the supreme authority of the CPI(M). However, during the time between two party congresses, the Central Committee is the highest decision-making body. The Central Committee shall elect from among its members a Polit Bureau including the General Secretary. The Polit Bureau carries on the work of the Central Committee between its two sessions and has the right to take political and organisational decisions in between two meetings of the Central Committee.

CPI(M) had a total income of ₹1.62 billion in fiscal year 2021–22. The party reported zero funding from electoral bonds.

== Name ==
CPI(M) is officially known as Bhārat kī Kamyunisṭ Pārṭī (Mārksvādī) in Hindi, but it is often known as Mārksvādī Kamyunisṭ Pārṭī, abbreviated MaKaPa, in press and media circles. During its initial years after the split, the party was often referred to by different names such as 'Left Communist Party' or 'Communist Party of India (Left)'. The party has used the name 'Left' because CPI people were dubbed 'rightist' in nature for their support of the Congress-Nehru regime. During the Kerala Legislative Assembly elections of 1965, the party adopted the name 'Communist Party of India (Marxist)'. It also applied to obtain its election symbol from the Election Commission of India.

== Background ==
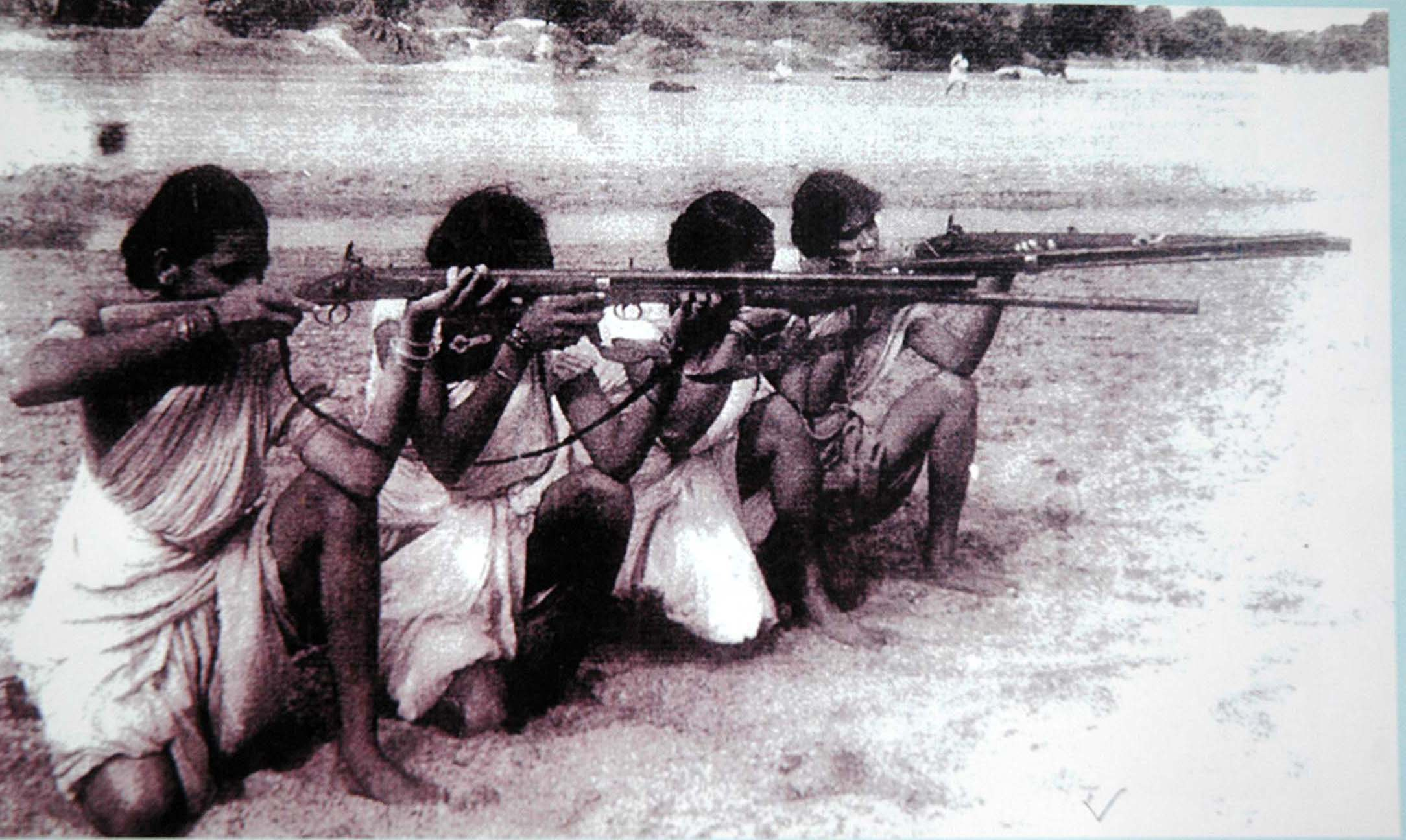
Guerrillas of the Telangana armed struggle (1946–1951)

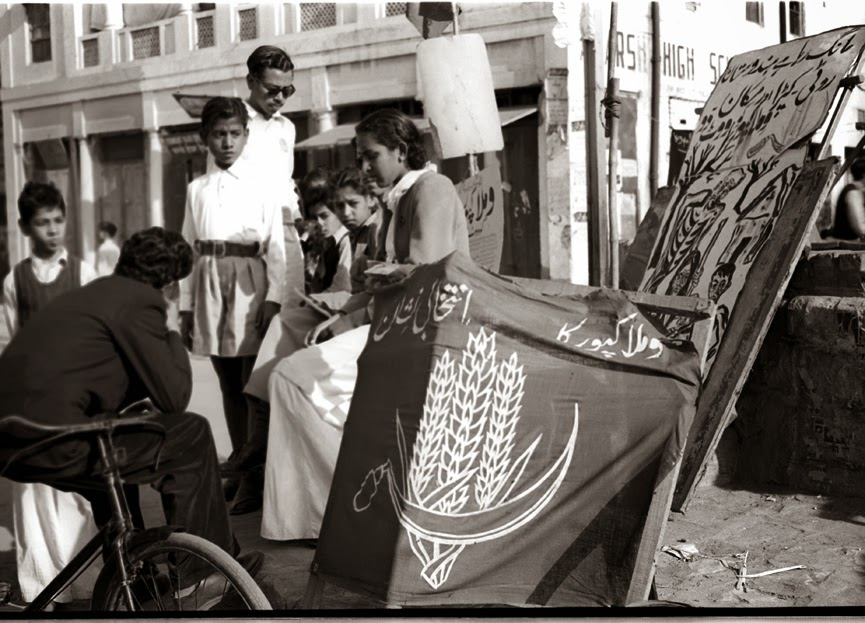
CPI election campaign in Karol Bagh, Delhi, for the 1952 Indian general election

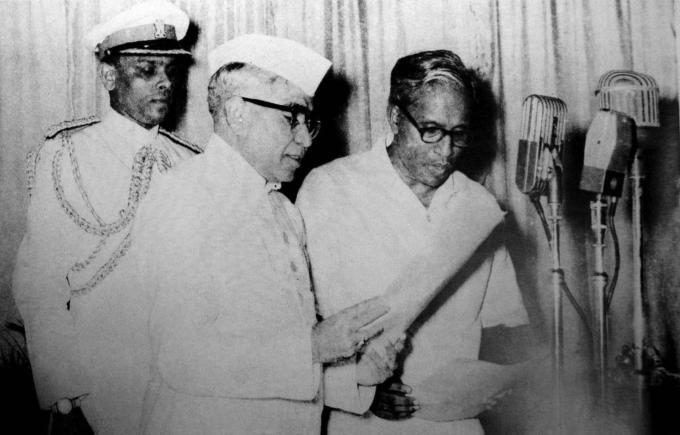
Swearing-in ceremony of E. M. S. Namboodiripad as first Chief Minister of Kerala, April 1957

The Communist Party of India (Marxist) emerged from a division within the Communist Party of India. The CPI had experienced an upsurge in support during the years following the World War II; it had also led armed rebellions in Telangana, Tripura, and Kerala. However, it soon abandoned the strategy of armed revolution in favor of working within the Parliament framework. In 1950, B. T. Ranadive, the CPI general secretary and a prominent representative of the radical sector inside the party, was demoted on grounds of left-adventurism.

Under the government of the Indian National Congress party of Jawaharlal Nehru, independent India developed close relations and a strategic partnership with the Soviet Union. The Soviet government consequently wished that the Indian communists moderate their criticism towards the Indian state and assume a supportive role towards the Congress governments. However, large sections of the CPI claimed that India remained a semi-feudal country and that class conflict could not be put on the back-burner for the sake of guarding the interests of Soviet trade and foreign policy. Moreover, the Indian National Congress appeared to be generally hostile towards political competition. In 1959 the central government intervened to impose President's rule in Kerala, toppling the E. M. S. Namboodiripad cabinet (the sole non-Congress state government in the country).

== History ==
=== Formation (1964) ===
The basis of difference in opinion between the two factions in CPI was ideological—about the assessment of the Indian scenario and the development of a party programme. This difference in opinion was also a reflection of whether the Communist Party in India would toe the line of the Communist Party of the Soviet Union (CPSU) or follow an independent path based on the concrete analysis of the Indian situation. The alleged 'right-wing' inside the party followed the Soviet path whereas the 'left-wing' wanted to follow the mass party with a class line with national characteristics, based on the 'independent' development of socialism in accordance to the India situation. Moreover, the faction of CPI which later became CPI(M) referred to the "right" strategy as a national approach of class collaboration; this was a damning charge within the communist movement, in which the prioritization of working-class interests and independence is considered paramount. Ideological difference also grew on the analysis of the role and character of the Indian bourgeoisie and the character of the Indian revolution. While the 'right wing' in the party sought the Indian bourgeoisie to have a 'progressive' character and called for a national democratic revolution, the 'left wing' sought the character of the Indian bourgeoisie to be essentially reactionary and called for a peoples' democratic revolution. However, as the 'left wing' grew, the Congress and the party's 'right wing' dubbed them as pro-Chinese and essentially made extensive efforts to incriminate them of committing 'anti-national' activities. This ideological difference later intensified, and ultimately gave rise to the establishment of CPI(M).

Hundreds of CPI leaders, accused of being pro-Chinese, were imprisoned. Thousands of Communists were detained without trial. (Note: The bulk of the detainees came from the left-wing of the CPI. However, cadres of the Socialist Unity Centre of India and the Workers Party of India were also targeted.) The CPI(M) has a strong history of championing labour rights and it supports the rights of industrial labourers, demanding fair wages, safe working conditions, and the right to unionize.

In 1962, Ajoy Ghosh, the General Secretary of the CPI died. After his death, Shripad Amrit Dange was installed as the party chairman (a new position) and E.M.S. Namboodiripad as general secretary. This was an attempt to achieve a compromise.

At a CPI National Council meeting held on 11 April 1964, 32 Council members walked out. (Note: The 32 were V. S. Achuthanandan, Muzaffar Ahmed, Guntur Bapanaiah, Makineni Basavapunnaiah, Jyoti Basu, A. K. Gopalan, Promode Dasgupta, Abdul Halim, E. K. Imbichi Bava, C. H. Kanaran, Hare Krishna Konar, A. V. Kunjambu, Jagjit Singh Lyallpuri, Shiv Kumar Mishra, Saroj Mukherjee, E. M. S. Namboodiripad, E. K. Nayanar, Mohan Punamia, P. Ramamurthi, K. Ramani, D. V. Rao, Moturu Hanumantha Rao, N. Prasad Rao, T. Nagi Reddy, N. Sankaraiah, Ram Piara Saraf, Bhag Singh, Puchalapalli Sundarayya, Harkishan Singh Surjeet, Dalip Singh Tapiala, R. N. Upadhyaya, and M. R. Venkataraman.)

The leftist section, to which the 32 National Council members belonged, organized a convention in Tenali, Andhra Pradesh 7 to 11 July. In this convention, the issues of the internal disputes in the party were discussed. 146 delegates, claiming to represent 100,000 CPI members, took part in the proceedings. The convention decided to convene the 7th Party Congress of CPI in Calcutta later the same year.

Marking a difference from the official sector of CPI, the Tenali convention was marked by the display of a large portrait of the Communist leader of China, Mao Zedong.

At the Tenali convention, a Bengal-based pro-Chinese group, representing one of the most radical streams of the CPI left-wing, presented a draft programme proposal of their own. These radicals criticized the draft programme proposal prepared by Makineni Basavapunnaiah for undermining class conflict and failing to take a clear pro-Chinese position in the ideological conflict between the CPSU and the CPC. (Note: Suniti Kumar Ghosh was a member of the group that presented this alternative draft proposal. His grouping was one of several left tendencies in the Bengali party branch.)

After the Tenali convention, the CPI left-wing organized party district and state conferences. In West Bengal, a few of these meetings became battlegrounds between the most radical elements and the more moderate leadership. At the Calcutta Party District Conference, an alternative draft programme was presented to the leadership by Parimal Das Gupta (a leading figure amongst far-left intellectuals in the party). Another alternative proposal was brought forward to the Calcutta Party District Conference by Aziz ul Haq, but Haq was initially banned from presenting it by the conference organizers. At the Calcutta Party District Conference, 42 delegates opposed M. Basavapunniah's official draft programme proposal.

At the Siliguri Party District Conference, the main draft proposal for a party programme was accepted; some additional points suggested by the far-left North Bengal cadre Charu Majumdar were added. However, Hare Krishna Konar (representing the leadership of the CPI left-wing) forbade the raising of the slogan Mao Tse-Tung Zindabad (Long live Mao Tse-Tung) at the conference.

Parimal Das Gupta's document was also presented to the leadership at the West Bengal State Conference of the CPI leftwing. Das Gupta and a few others spoke at the conference, demanding the party ought to adopt the class analysis of the Indian state of the 1951 CPI conference. His proposal was, however, voted down.

The Calcutta Congress was held between 31 October and 7 November, at Tyagraja Hall in southern Calcutta. Simultaneously, the CPI convened a Party Congress in Bombay. The group which assembled in Calcutta would later adopt the name 'Communist Party of India (Marxist)', to differentiate themselves from the CPI. The CPI(M) also adopted its own political programme. Puchalapalli Sundarayya was elected general secretary of the party.

In total, 422 delegates took part in the Calcutta Congress. CPI(M) claimed that they represented 104,421 CPI members; this is 60% of the total party membership.

At the Calcutta conference, the party adopted a class analysis of the character of the Indian state, that claimed the Indian bourgeoisie was increasingly collaborating with imperialism.

Parimal Das Gupta's alternative draft programme was not circulated at the Calcutta conference. However, Souren Bose, a delegate from the far-left stronghold Darjeeling, spoke at the conference asking why no portrait had been raised of Mao Tse-Tung along with the portraits of other communist stalwarts. His intervention was met with huge applause from conference delegates.

=== Early years (1964–1966) ===
The CPI (M) was born into a hostile political climate. At the time of the holding of its Calcutta Congress, large sections of its leaders and cadres were jailed without trial. Again on 29–30 December, over a thousand CPI (M) cadres were arrested and detained and held in jail without trial. In 1965, new waves of arrests of CPI(M) cadres took place in West Bengal, as the party launched agitations against the rise in fares in the Calcutta Tramways Company and against the then-prevailing food crisis. Statewide general strikes and hartals were observed on 5 August 1965, 10–11 March 1966, and 6 April 1966. The March 1966 general strike resulted in several deaths during confrontations with police forces.

Also in Kerala, mass arrests of CPI(M) cadres were carried out during 1965. In Bihar, the party called for a Bandh (general strike) in Patna on 9 August 1965 in protest against the Congress state government. During the strike, police resorted to violent actions against the organizers of the strike. The strike was followed by agitations in other parts of the state.

P. Sundaraiah, after being released from jail, spent the period of September 1965 to February 1966 in Moscow for medical treatment. In Moscow, he also held talks with the CPSU.

The Central Committee of CPI(M) held its first meeting on 12–19 June 1966. The reason for delaying the holding of a regular CC meeting was that several of the persons elected as CC members at the Calcutta Congress were jailed at the time. (Note: The jailed members of the new CC, at the time of the Calcutta Congress, were B.T. Ranadive, Muzaffar Ahmed, Hare Krishna Konar, and Promode Dasgupta.) A CC meeting had been scheduled to have been held in Thrissur during the last days of 1964, but had been canceled due to the wave of arrests against the party. The meeting discussed tactics for electoral alliances and concluded that the party should seek to form a broad electoral alliance with all non-reactionary opposition parties in West Bengal (i.e. all parties except Bharatiya Jana Sangh and Swatantra Party). This decision was strongly criticized by the Communist Party of China (CPC), the Party of Labour of Albania, the Communist Party of New Zealand, and the radicals within the party itself. The line was changed at a National Council meeting in Jalandhar in October 1966, where it was decided that the party should only form alliances with select left parties.

=== Naxalbari uprising (1967) ===
At this point, the party stood at crossroads. There were radical sections of the party who were wary of the increasing parliamentary focus of the party leadership, especially after the electoral victories in West Bengal and Kerala. Developments in China also affected the situation inside the party. In West Bengal, two separate internal dissident tendencies emerged, which both could be identified as supporting the Chinese line. (Note: According to Basu, there were two nuclei of radicals in the party organization in West Bengal. One "theorist" section around Parimal Das Gupta in Calcutta, which wanted to persuade the party leadership to correct revisionist mistakes through inner-party debate, and one "actionist" section led by Charu Majumdar and Kanu Sanyal in North Bengal. The 'actionists' were impatient and strived to organize armed uprisings. According to Basu, due to the prevailing political climate of youth and student rebellion, it was the 'actionists' who came to dominate the new Maoist movement in India, instead of the more theoretically advanced sections. This dichotomy is however rebuffed by followers of the radical stream, for example, the CPI(ML) Liberation.)

In 1967, a peasant uprising broke out in Naxalbari, in northern West Bengal. The insurgency was led by hardline district-level CPI(M) leaders Charu Majumdar and Kanu Sanyal. The hardliners within CPI(M) saw the Naxalbari uprising as the spark that would ignite the Indian revolution. Majumdar and others broke from CPI(M). The CPC hailed the Naxalbari movement, causing an abrupt break in CPI(M)-CPC relations. (Note: On 1 July, People's Daily carried an article titled "Spring Thunder Over India", expressing the support of CPC to the Naxalbari rebels. At its meeting in Madurai on 18–27 August 1967, the Central Committee of CPI(M) adopted a resolution titled "Resolution on Divergent Views Between Our Party and the Communist Party of China on Certain Fundamental Issues of Programme and Policy".) Majumdar and his group formed the Maoist-oriented Communist Party of India (Marxist-Leninst) in 1969.

The Naxalbari movement was violently repressed by the West Bengal government, of which CPI(M) was a major partner. Within the party, the hardliners rallied around an All India Coordination Committee of Communist Revolutionaries. Following the 1968 Burdwan plenum of CPI(M) (held on 5–12 April 1968), the AICCCR separated itself from CPI(M). This split divided the party throughout the country. But notably in West Bengal, which was the center of the violent radicalized stream, no prominent leading figure left the party. The party and the Naxalites (as the rebels were called) were soon to get into a bloody feud.

In Andhra Pradesh, another revolt was taking place. There the pro-Naxalbari dissidents had not established any presence. However, in the party organization, there were many veterans from the Telangana armed struggle; they rallied against the central party leadership. In Andhra Pradesh, the radicals had a strong base even amongst the state-level leadership. The main leader of the radical tendency was T. Nagi Reddy, a member of the state legislative assembly. On 15 June 1968, the leaders of the radical tendency published a press statement outlining the critique of the development of CPI(M). It was signed by T. Nagi Reddy, D.V. Rao, Kolla Venkaiah, and Chandra Pulla Reddy. (Note: This press statement was reproduced in full in the central CPI(M) publication, People's Democracy, on 30 June. P. Sundarayya and M. Basavapunniah, acting on behalf of the Polit Bureau of CPI(M), formulated a response to the statement on 16 June, titled 'Rebuff the Rebels, Uphold Party Unity'.)

In total, around 50% of the party cadres in Andhra Pradesh left the party to form the Andhra Pradesh Coordination Committee of Communist Revolutionaries, under the leadership of T. Nagi Reddy. (Note: Some perceive that the Chinese leadership severely misjudged the actual conditions of different Indian factions at the time, giving their full support to the Majumdar-Sanyal group whilst keeping the Andhra Pradesh radicals (that had a considerable mass following) at distance.)

=== Dismissal of United Front governments in West Bengal and Kerala (1967–1970) ===
In November 1967, the West Bengal United Front government was dismissed by the central government. Initially, the Indian National Congress formed a minority government led by Prafulla Chandra Ghosh, but that cabinet did not last long. Following the proclamation that the United Front government had been dislodged, a 48-hour hartal was effective throughout the state. After the fall of the Ghosh cabinet, the state was put under President's Rule. CPI(M) launched agitations against the interventions of the central government in West Bengal.

The 8th Party Congress of CPI(M) was held in Kochi, Kerala, on 23–29 December 1968. On 25 December 1968, whilst the congress was held, 42 Dalits were burned alive in the Tamil Nadu village of Kizhavenmani. The massacre was a retaliation from landlords after Dalit labourers had taken part in a CPI(M)-led agitation for higher wages.

The United Front government in Kerala was forced out of office in October 1969, as the CPI, RSP, KTP, and Muslim League ministers resigned. E.M.S. Namboodiripad handed in his resignation on 24 October. A coalition government led by CPI leader C. Achutha Menon was formed, with the outside support of the Indian National Congress.

==== Elections in West Bengal and Kerala ====
Fresh elections were held in West Bengal in 1969. CPI(M) contested 97 seats and won 80. The party was now the largest in the West Bengal legislative. (Note: Indian National Congress had won 23 seats, Bangla Congress 33, and CPI 30. CPI(M) allies also won several seats. (Note: Statistical Report on General Election, 1969 to the Legislative Assembly of West Bengal (PDF). Election Commission of India (Report). New Delhi. Archived from the original (PDF) on 29 November 2007.)) However, with the active support of CPI and the Bangla Congress, Ajoy Mukherjee was returned as Chief Minister of the state. Mukherjee resigned on 16 March 1970, after a pact had been reached between CPI, Bangla Congress, and the Indian National Congress against CPI(M). CPI(M) strove to form a new government, instead but the central government put the state under President's Rule.

=== Land Reform ===
Though land reform was successfully done in three Indian states (West Bengal, Kerala, and Tamil Nadu), India's first land reform was done in West Bengal in 1967, under the leadership of two Communist leaders: Hare Krishna Konar and Benoy Choudhury, in which Hare Krishna Konar played a leading role in getting surplus land held by big land owners in excess of land ceiling laws and kept 'benami' (or false names) vested with the state. The quantum of land thus vested was around one million acres (4,000 km2) of good agricultural land. Subsequently, under the leadership of Hare Krishna Konar and Benoy Choudhury land was distributed amongst 2.4 million landless and poor farmers. Later after 1970 the united front government of west Bengal fail and the land reform was also stopped for seven years and after left front came in West Bengal in 1977 this land reform was renamed to Operation Barga and this barga was the notable contribution to the people from Left Front Government of West Bengal. To begin with, group meetings between Officials and Bargadars were organized during "settlement camps" (also called "Reorientation camps"), where the bargadars could discuss their grievances. The first such camp was held at Halusai in Polba taluk in Hooghly district from 18 to 20 May 1978. In noted camp, two Adibashi Borgaders objected procedure adopted by the official for Barga Operation. They suggested to start it organising people in the field instead of sitting in the houses of rural rich people or the places dominated by them.

=== Formation of CITU (1970) ===
Centre of Indian Trade Unions, CITU is a National level Trade Union in India and its trade union wing is a spearhead of the Indian Trade Union Movement. The Centre of Indian Trade Unions is today one of biggest assembly of workers and classes of India. It has strong unchallengeable presence in the Indian state of Tripura besides a good presence in West Bengal, Kerala and Kanpur. They have an average presence in Tamil Nadu and Andhra Pradesh.

According to the provisional statistics from the Ministry of Labour, CITU had a membership of approximately 6,040,000 in 2015. Tapan Kumar Sen is the General Secretary and K. Hemalata is the president of CITU. K. Hemalata was the first woman President in CITU who was elected after A. K. Padmanabhan. It runs a monthly organ named Working Class. CITU is affiliated to the World Federation of Trade Unions.

=== Outbreak of war in East Pakistan (1971–1972) ===
In 1971, Bangladesh (formerly East Pakistan) declared its independence from Pakistan. The Pakistani military tried to quell the uprising. India intervened militarily and gave active backing to the Bangladeshi rebels. Millions of Bangladeshi refugees sought shelter in India, especially in West Bengal.

At the time, the radical sections of the Bangladeshi communist movement were divided into many factions. Whilst the pro-Soviet Communist Party of Bangladesh actively participated in the rebellion, the pro-China communist tendency found itself in a peculiar situation as China had sided with Pakistan in the war. In Calcutta, where many Bangladeshi leftists had sought refuge, CPI(M) worked to co-ordinate the efforts to create a new political organization. In the fall of 1971 three small groups, which were all hosted by the CPI(M), came together to form the Bangladesh Communist Party (Leninist). The new party became the sister party of CPI(M) in Bangladesh. (Note: The same is also true for the Workers Party of Bangladesh, which was formed in 1980 when BCP(L) merged with other groups. Although politically close, WPB can be said to have a more Maoist-oriented profile than CPI(M).)

=== Boycott of Assembly and Emergency rule (1972–1977) ===
In 1975, the Prime Minister of India, Indira Gandhi imposed a State of emergency on the premise of internal disturbances suspending elections, legitimising rule by decree and curbing civil liberties. The proposition for the declaration of the emergency and the formal draft of the ordinance were both notably corroborated to have been forwarded by Siddhartha Shankar Ray. The Communist Party of India (Marxist) emerged as one of the primary opposition to The Emergency (India). The following period witnessed a succession of authoritarian measures and political repression, which was particularly severe in West Bengal. The members of the CPI-M's labour union became the first subject to political repression and mass arrests while the rest of the members of the CPI-M went underground.

With the initiation of the Jayaprakash Narayan (JP)'s movement, the CPI-M began providing support to it and went on to participate in discussions for the creation of a united front under the umbrella of the Janata Party. Several of the leaders of the CPI-M were also influenced by JP with Jyoti Basu noted to be one of his prominent admirers having worked under him in the All India Railwaymen's Federation during the 1940s. The involvement of the Hindutva movement however complicated matters, according to JP the formal inclusion of the marxists who had undergone a splintering and whose organisation was localised in particular region would have been detrimental to the movement as the Rashtriya Swayamsevak Sangh members would switch sides if they joined. JP and Basu eventually came to an agreement that the CPI-M would not formally join the Janata Party as it would weaken the movement. After the revocation of the emergency, the CPI-M joined an electoral alliance with the Janata Party in the 1977 Indian general election which resulted in an overwhelming victory for the Janata Alliance.

=== Left Front Government formation in West Bengal, Kerala and Tripura assembly (1977 afterwards) ===
==== West Bengal ====
CPI(M) West Bengal under the leadership of Jyoti Basu fought the 1977 West Bengal Legislative Assembly election. Initially, the election was planned to fight in alliance with the Janata Party, but the negotiations between the parties broke down. This led to a three sided contested between the Indian National Congress, the Janata Party and the Communist Party of India (Marxist) led Left Front coalition. The results of the election was a surprising sweep for the Left Front winning 230 seats out of 290 with the CPI-M winning an absolute majority on its own, Basu became the Chief Minister of West Bengal. From the 1977 election through to 2011, the CPI(M) led Left Front won seven consecutive elections. Under Jyoti Basu's leadership the Left Front won, 1977, 1982, 1987, 1991, 1996 elections. For the next 23 years he was the Chief Minister of West Bengal making him the longest serving at this position.

In the late 2000s, the Left Front saw a change in leadership. Under the leadership of Buddhadeb Bhattacharjee, the Left Front won the elections of 2001 elections and 2006. From 2000 to 2011, remained the Chief Minister of West Bengal for 11 years.

Following the events of 2007 Nandigram anti land acquisition violence and the 2006 Singur anti land acquisition violence, led by opposition parties in West Bengal. In the 2011 assembly election lost the elections marking the end of 34-year rule of Left Front, the longest-serving democratically elected communist government in the world, a fact that was noted by international media. After 2021 elections the Left Front has no representatives in the West Bengal Legislative Assembly.

==== Kerala ====
After the CPI split in 1964, prominent communist leader in Kerala E.M.S. Namboodiripad, A. K. Gopalan and K. R. Gouri Amma stood with the Communist Party of India (Marxist). One year after the split, in the 1965 elections CPI(M) which was splinter faction of CPI, emerged as the largest party in the assembly with 40 seats, whereas the CPI settled with 3 seats only. However no single party could form a ministry commanding majority and hence this election is considered abortive. President's rule was invoked for the fourth time.

In the 1967 Kerala assembly election both communist parties—CPI (M) and CPI—along with smaller parties including SSP and Muslim League contested this election as a United Front. A total of seven parties contested in the front, and the front was known as Saptakakshi Munnani. The CPI(M) led front won the election with a record 113 seats out of 133 seats and formed the government under E.M.S. Namboodiripad.

In the late 1970s and early 1980s, two main pre-poll political alliances were formed: the Left Democratic Front (LDF) led by the Communist Party of India (Marxist) and Communist Party of India and the United Democratic Front (UDF), led by the Indian National Congress. These pre-poll political alliances of Kerala have stabilized strongly in such a manner that, with rare exceptions, most of the coalition partners stick their loyalty to the respective alliances (Left Democratic Front or United Democratic Front).

LDF first came into power in Kerala Legislative Assembly in 1980 under the leadership of E. K. Nayanar who later became the longest serving Chief minister of Kerala, ever since 1980 election, the power has been clearly alternating between the two alliances till the 2016. In 2016, LDF won the 2016 election and had a historic re-election in 2021 election where an incumbent government was re-elected for first time in 40 years. Pinarayi Vijayan was the first chief minister of Kerala to be re-elected after completing a full term (five years) in office. The party is currently in opposition.

==== Tripura ====
Under the leadership of Nripen Chakraborty, the CPI(M) led Left Front won the 1977 assembly elections. Nripen Chakraborty, became the first Chief minister of Tripura from CPI(M). In the next 1983 assembly elections the incumbent government of Left Front was again re-elected and therefore it was in the government for 10 years. In 1988 assembly elections CPI(M) was out of power for five years despite being the largest party by seats won. In 1993 assembly elections, the Left Front won the elections and Dasarath Deb sworn in as the Chief minister of Tripura.

From 1993 to 2013, the Left Front won five elections continuously. Since the 1998 assembly elections, Manik Sarkar was the Chief minister of Tripura for 20 years making him the longest serving at the position in Tripura. Under his leadership the Left Front has won 1998, 2003, 2008 and 2013. Currently, CPI(M) is the main opposition party in the Tripura Legislative Assembly.

The Communist Party of India (Marxist) is the dominant party in the coalition. The other four members of the Left Front are the Communist Party of India, the Revolutionary Socialist Party, the All India Forward Bloc and the Communist Party of India (Marxist–Leninist) Liberation.

=== International Meeting of Communist and Workers' Parties ===
In 2009, CPI(M) hosted 11th International Communist Parties Meeting in New Delhi. The summit was attended by 57 communist parties from 48 countries.

== Leadership and organisation ==
=== Leadership ===
Old Gallery

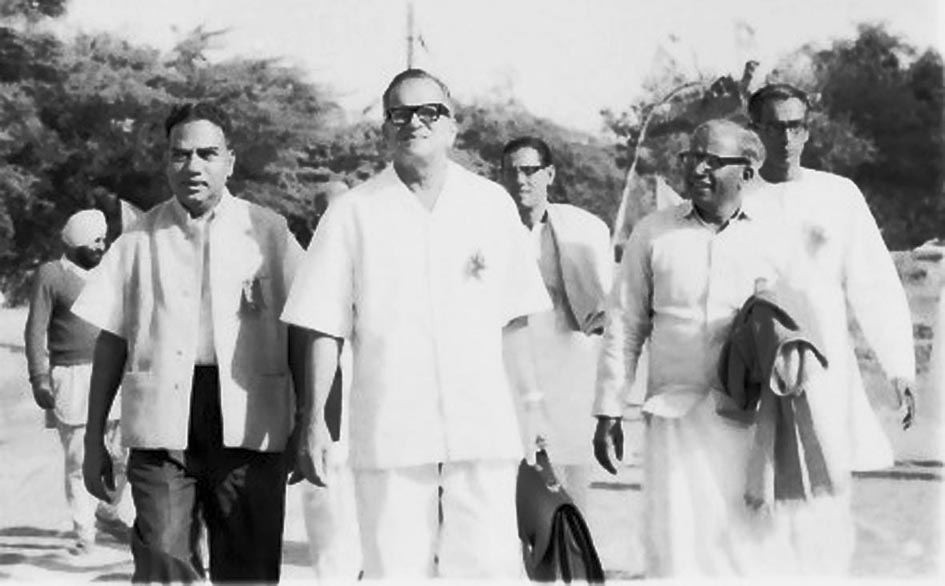
A. K. Gopalan (left), B. T. Ranadive (center), E.M.S. Namboodiripad (right) and H. K. Konar (extreme right) with other leaders in Kolkata, 1966

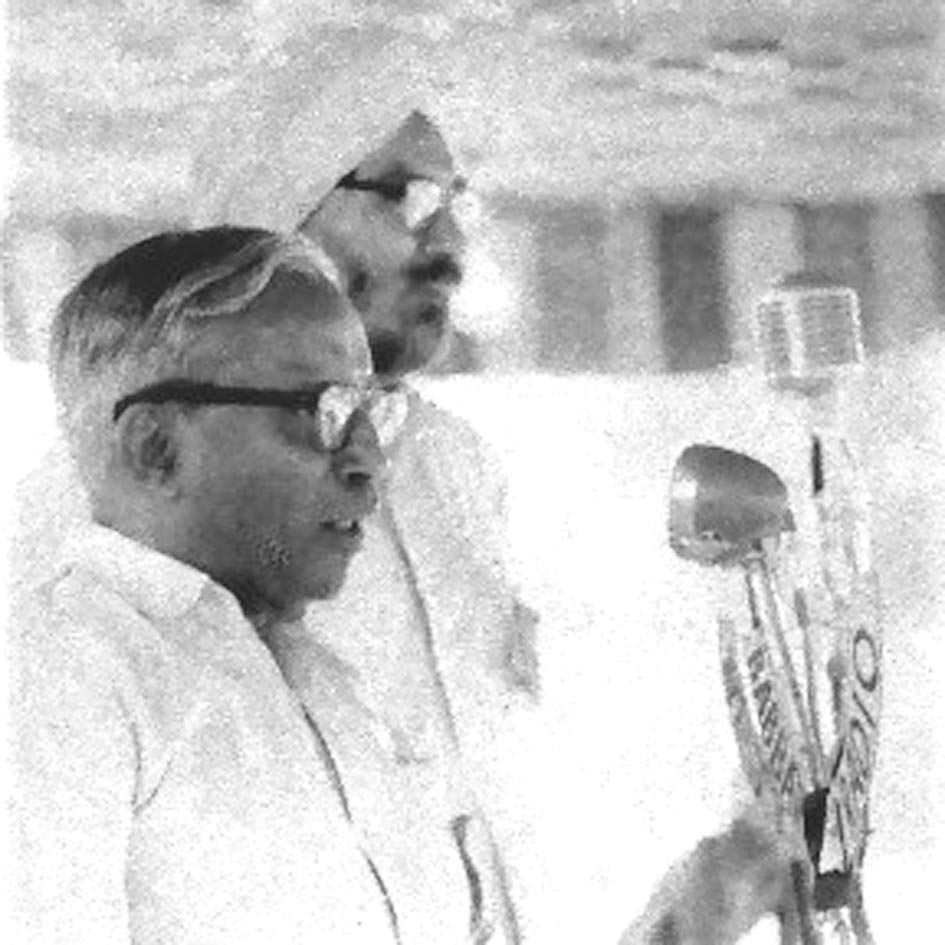
E. M. S. Namboodiripad and J. S. Lyallpuri, 1966

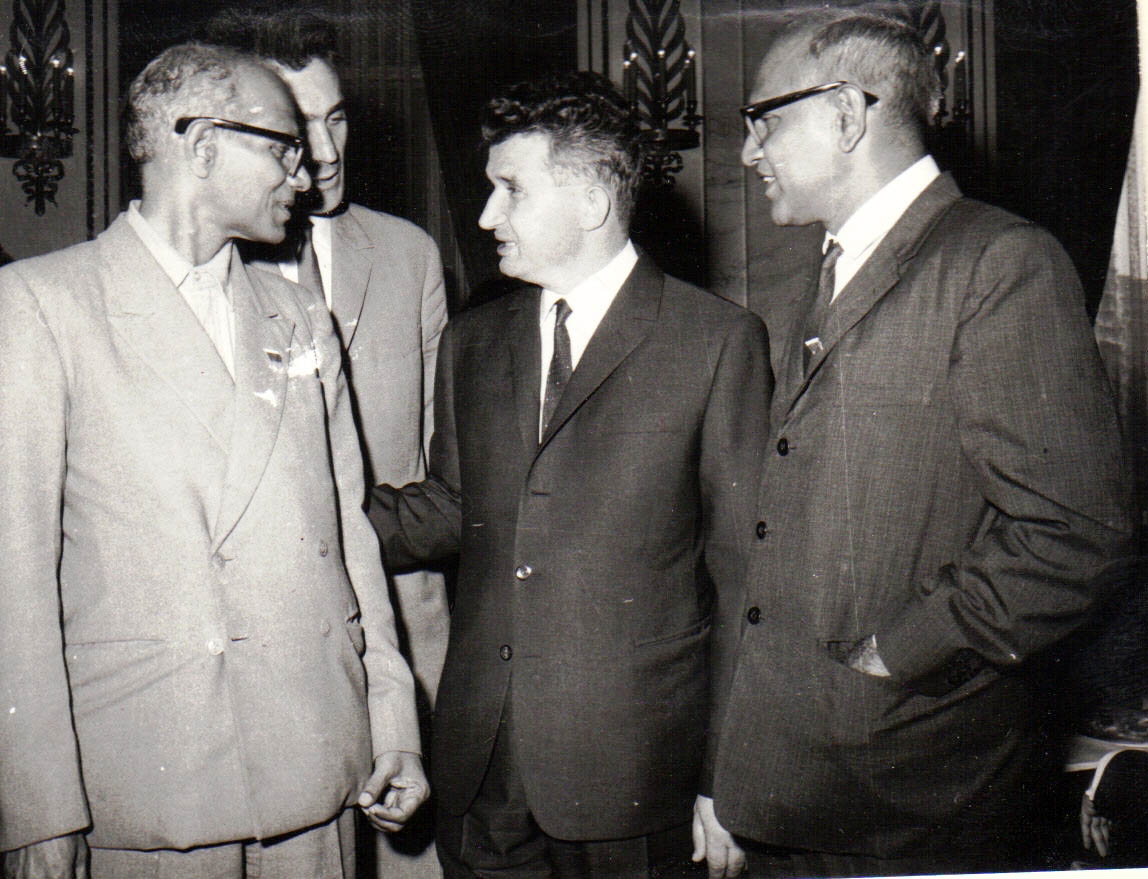
P. Sundarayya with 1st President of Romania, Nicolae Ceaușescu, 1969

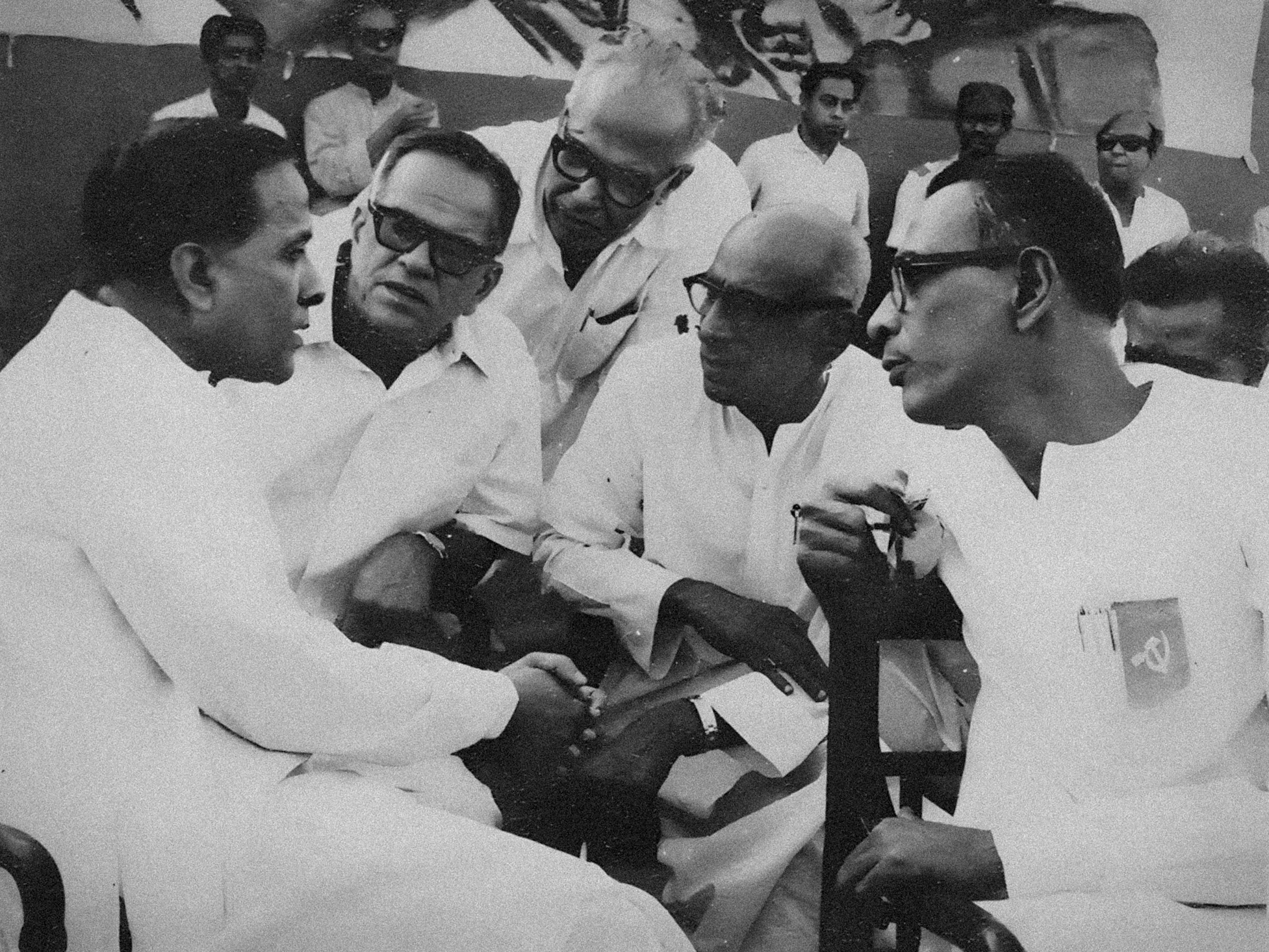
Basu, Ranadive, Mukherjee, Basavapunnaiah and Konar in the 20th conference of the AIKS held in Barsul, West Bengal, 1969

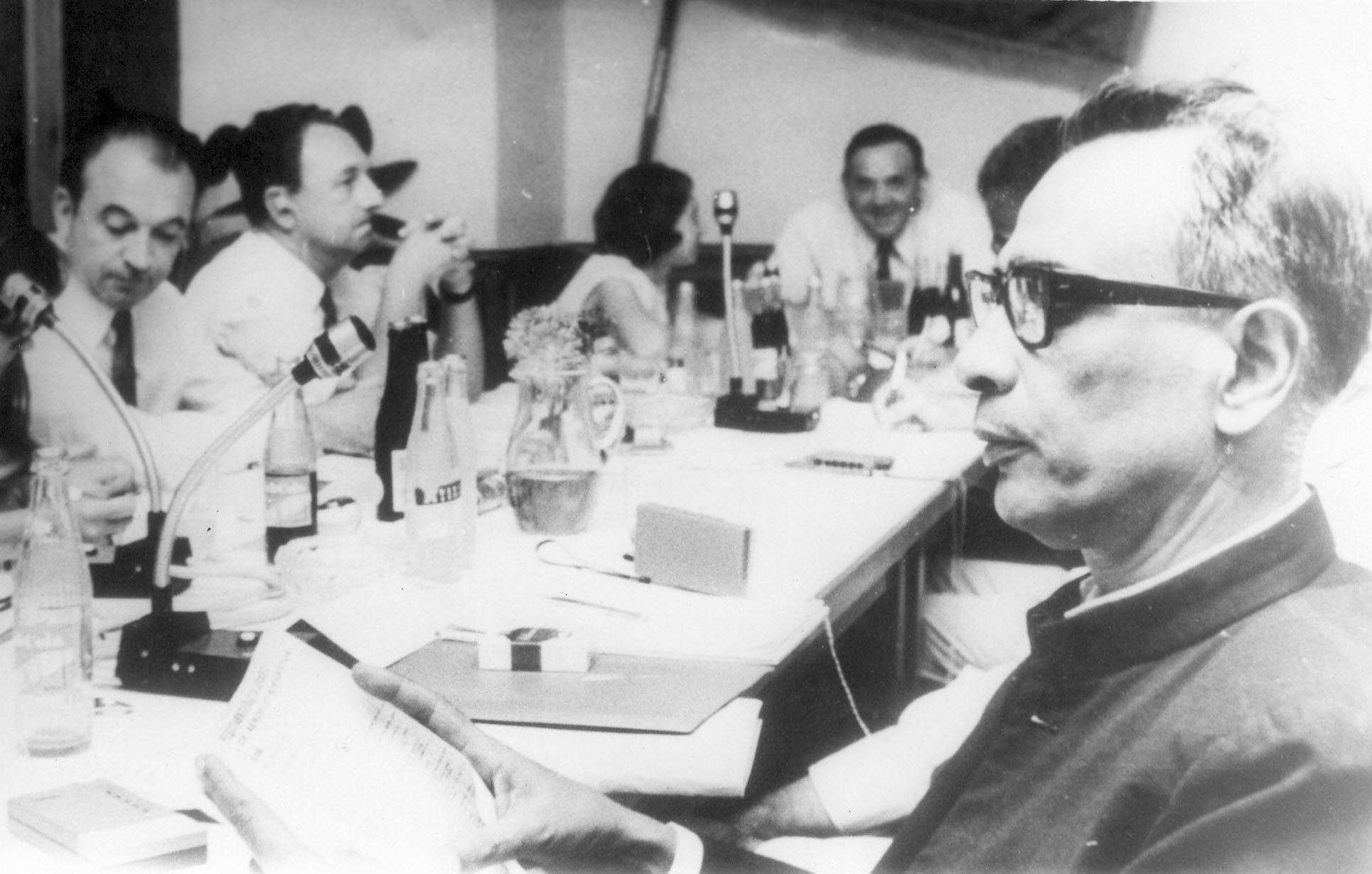
H. K. Konar leading the conference of the TUIAFPW, in the 1970s

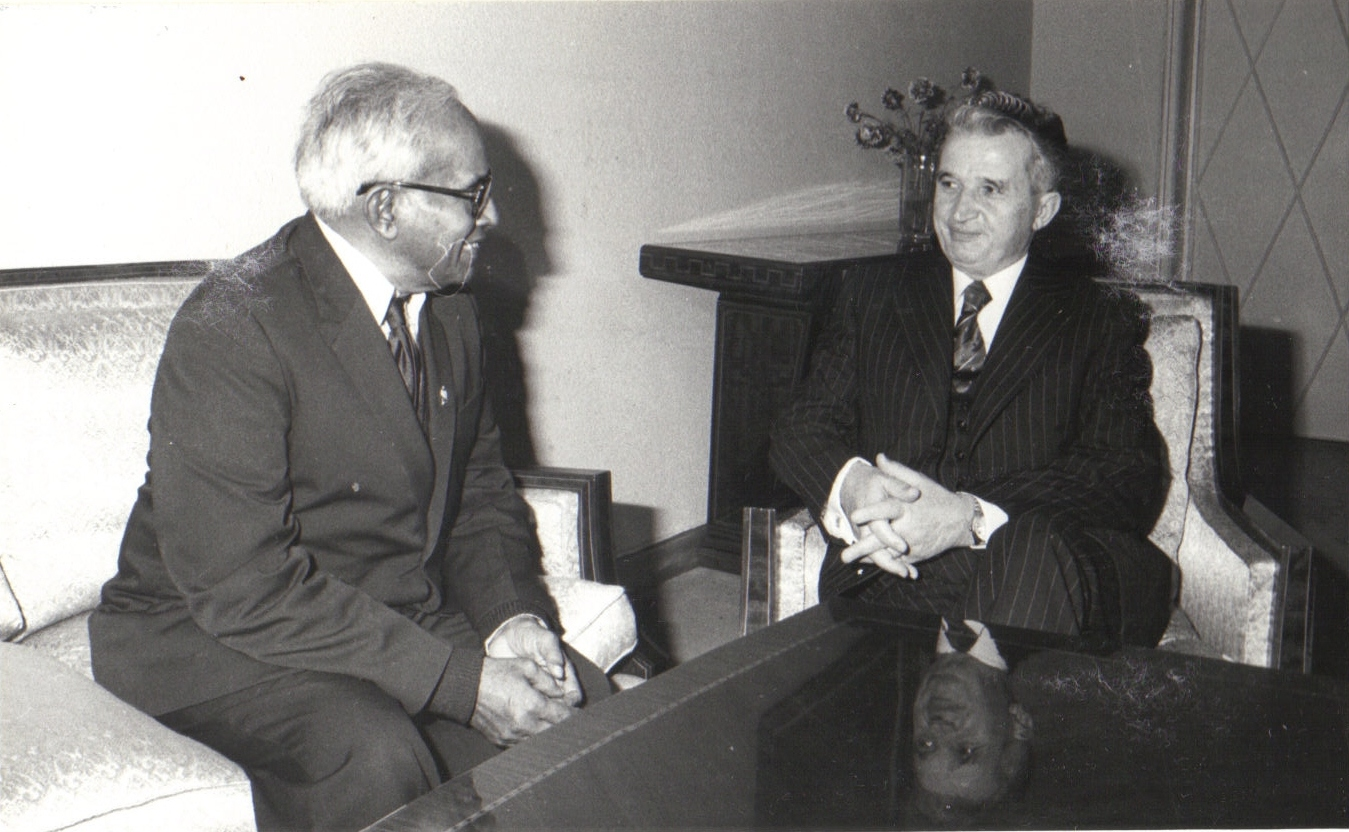
E. M. S. Namboodiripad with 1st President of Romania, Nicolae Ceaușescu, 1979

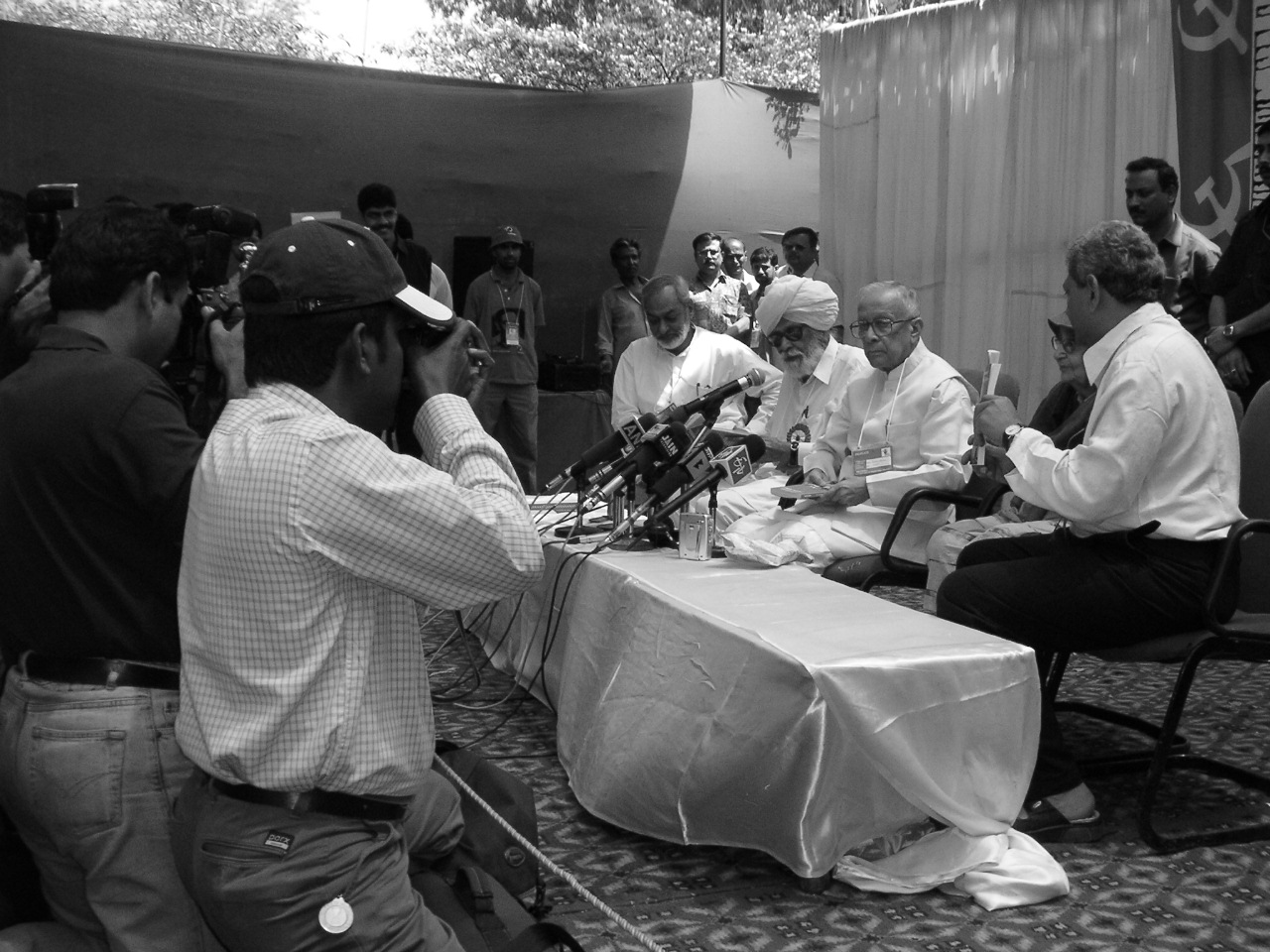
H. S. Surjeet, Jyoti Basu, Lakshmi Sahgal, and Sitaram Yechury in the 18th party congress at Delhi, 2005
New Gallery

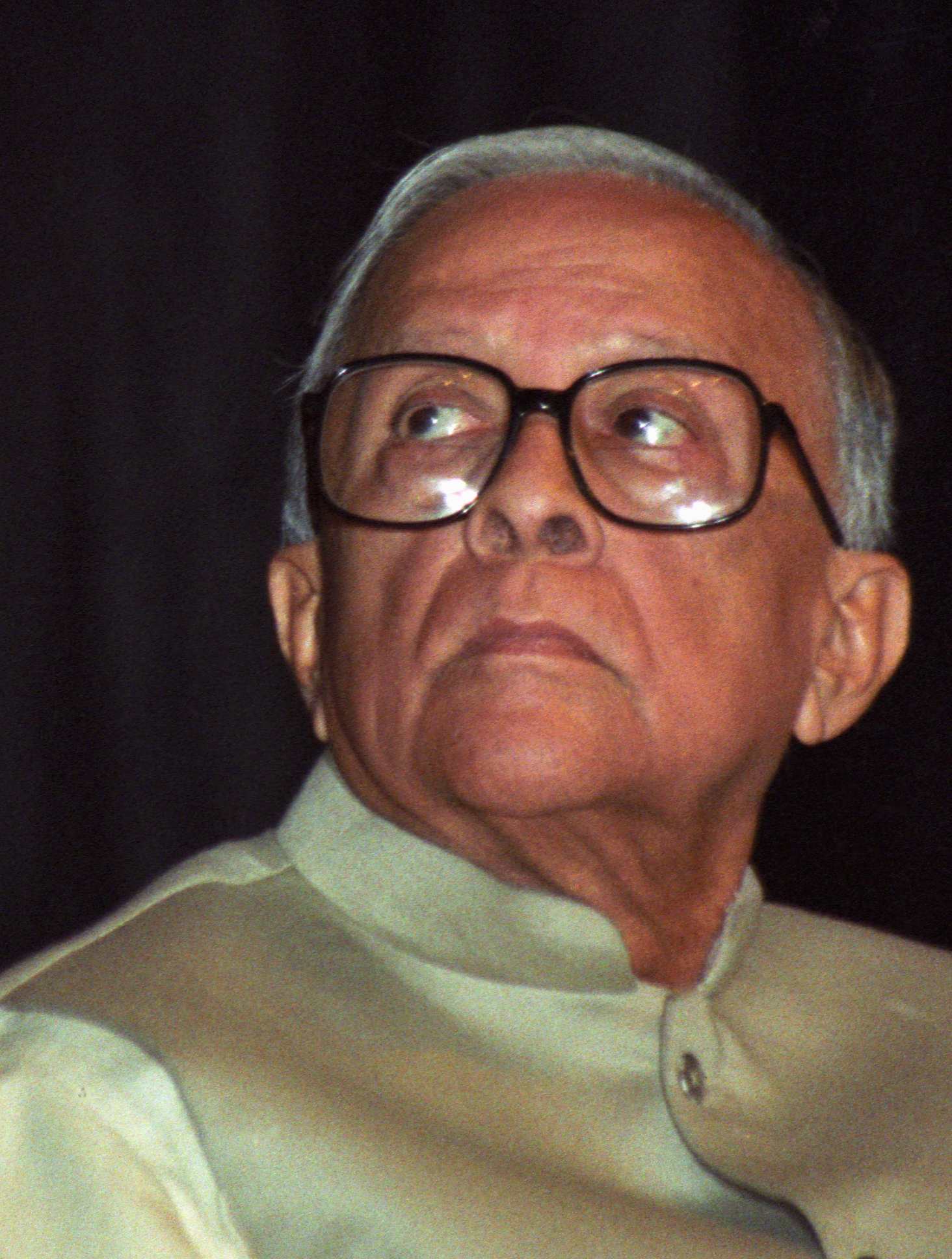
Jyoti Basu,
longest-serving Chief Minister of West Bengal

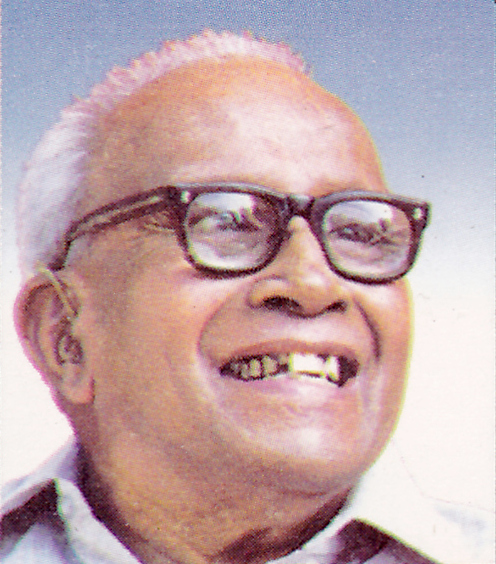
E.M.S. Namboodiripad,
1st Chief minister of Kerala

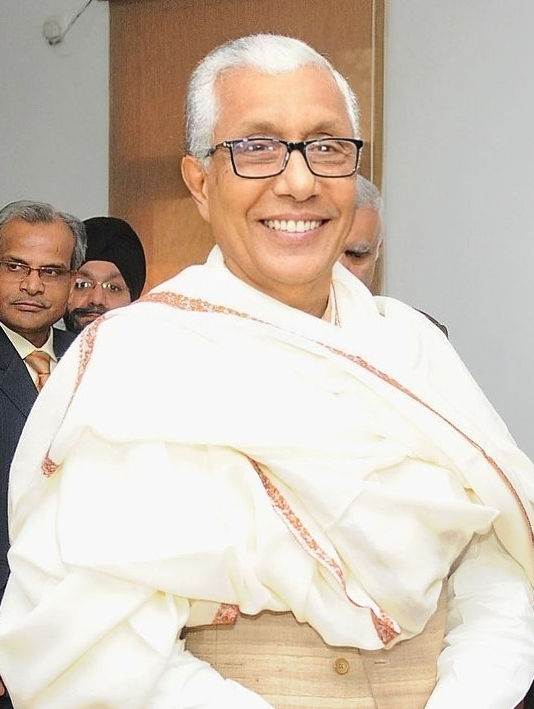
Manik Sarkar,
longest-serving Chief minister of Tripura

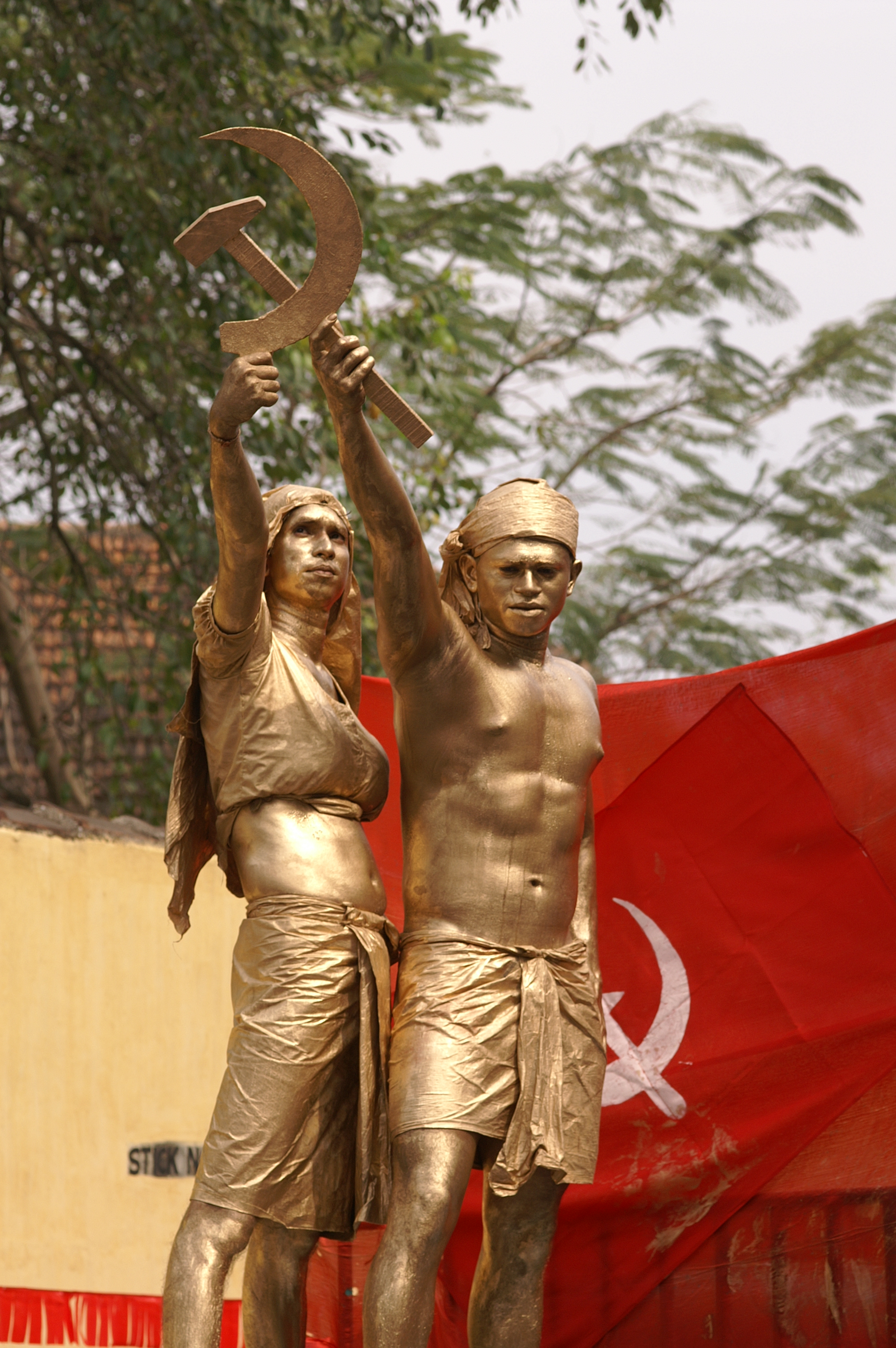
A tableau in a CPI(M) rally in Kerala, India showing two farmers forming the hammer and sickle

The 24th Congress of the CPI(M) held between 2 and 6 April 2025 at Madurai, Tamil Nadu elected an 85-member Central Committee with one seat left vacant. There are also seven special invitees and fout permanent invitees to the Central Committee. The Central Committee at its meeting held on 6 April 2025 at the conclusion of the Congress elected a 18-member Politburo. The Central Committee also elected Com. M. A. Baby as the General Secretary. The post of General Secretary was left vacant after the death of Sitaram Yechury on 12 September 2024.

=== Politburo members ===
Portrait	Name	Note
	M. A. Baby	General Secretary; Member of Central Secretariat; Former Minister for Education and Culture in Kerala; Former Member of Parliament, Rajya Sabha
	B. V. Raghavulu	Member of Central Secretariat; Former Andhra Pradesh State Secretary
	Pinarayi Vijayan	Member of Kerala State Secretariat former Chief Minister of Kerala
	Tapan Sen	CITU General Secretary; Former Member of Parliament, Rajya Sabha
	Nilotpal Basu	Former SFI General Secretary; Former Member of Parliament, Rajya Sabha
	A. Vijayaraghavan	AIAWU President; Former LDF Convenor; Former Member of Parliament, Lok Sabha; Former Member of Parliament, Rajya Sabha
	Mohammed Salim	West Bengal State Secretary; Former Member of Parliament, Rajya Sabha; Former Minister for Technical Education and Training, Youth Welfare, Minority Development and Welfare, Self Employment in West Bengal; Former Member of Parliament, Lok Sabha
	Ashok Dhawale	AIKS President; Former Maharashtra State Secretary
	Ram Chandra Dome	Member of West Bengal State Secretariat; Former Member of Parliament, Lok Sabha
	M. V. Govindan	Kerala State Secretary; Member of Legislative Assembly, Kerala; Former Minister for Local Self Governments and Excise in Kerala
	Jitendra Choudhury	Tripura State Secretary; Leader of Opposition in Tripura Legislative Assembly; Former Minister of Forest and Industry, Commerce, Sports in Tripura; Former Member of Parliament, Lok Sabha
	K. Balakrishnan	Former Tamil Nadu State Secretary; Former Member of Legislative Assembly, Tamil Nadu
	U. Vasuki	AIDWA Vice President
	Amra Ram	AIKS Vice President; Member of Parliament, Lok Sabha; Former Member of Legislative Assembly, Rajasthan
	Srideep Bhattacharya	Member of West Bengal State Secretariat
	Vijoo Krishnan	AIKS General Secretary
	Mariam Dhawale	AIDWA General Secretary
	R. Arun Kumar	Former SFI President

=== General Secretaries ===
Communist Party of India (Marxist)

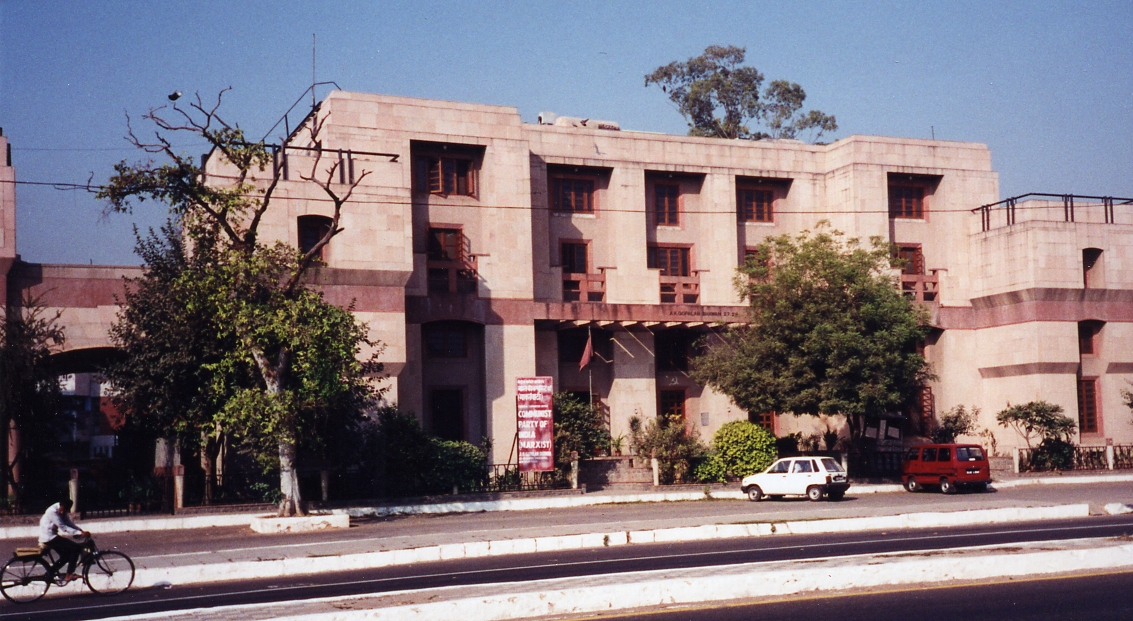
AKG Bhavan, the CPI(M) national headquarters in Delhi 28°37′53.6″N 77°12′17.9″E

Article XV, Section 15 of the party constitution says:

"No person can hold the position of the General Secretary for more than three full terms. Full term means the period between two Party Congresses. In a special situation, a person who has completed three full terms as General Secretary may be re-elected for a fourth term provided it is so decided by the Central Committee with a three-fourth majority. But in no case can that person be elected again for another term in addition to the fourth term."

List of General Secretaries
S. No.	Term	Portrait	Name	References
1	1964–1978		Puchalapalli Sundarayya	
1	After the split of the Communist Party of India in the 7th General meeting, a new political outfit was formed Communist Party of India (Marxist). Puchalapalli Sundarayya was elected as its General Secretary.			
2	1978–1992		E. M. S. Namboodiripad	
2	The two time Chief Minister of Kerala, E. M. S. Namboodiripad was elected as the General Secretary in the 10th party Congress.			
3	1992–2005		Harkishan Singh Surjeet	
3	Harkishan Singh Surjeet came to head the CPI-M as its general secretary in 1992, an influential post he held until 2005 when failing health forced him into virtual retirement.			
4	2005–2015		Prakash Karat	
4	Prakash Karat was elected as the general secretary in the 18th party Congress. He was re-elected again to hold office until 2015.			
5	2015–2024		Sitaram Yechury	
5	Sitaram Yechury was first elected as the party general secretary during the 21st party Congress at Visakhapatnam in April 2015. He was re-elected to the post at the 22nd party Congress at Hyderabad on 18 April 2018. Again re-elected for the third time at 23rd Party Congress held at Kannur, Kerala in April 2022 to hold the office until his death on 12 September 2024. Till date he is the only general secretary in the history of the party to die in office.			
Interim Co-ordinator	2024–2025		Prakash Karat	
Interim Co-ordinator	Prakash Karat was elected as the interim coordinator after Yechury's death until the new general secretary was elected.			
6	2025–		M. A. Baby	
6	M. A. Baby was elected as the general secretary in the 24th party Congress held at Madurai in 2025			

=== State Secretaries ===
State	State Secretary
Andaman and Nicobar Islands	D. Ayyappan
Andhra Pradesh	V. Srinivasa Rao
Assam	Suprakash Talukdar
Bihar	Lalan Choudhary
Delhi	Anurag Saxena
Chhattisgarh	Bal Singh
Goa	Victor Savio Bragança
Gujarat	Hitendra Bhatt
Haryana	Prem Chand
Himachal Pradesh	Sanjay Chauhan
Jammu and Kashmir	Mohammed Abass Rather
Jharkhand	Prakash Viplav
Karnataka	K. Prakash
Kerala	M. V. Govindan
Madhya Pradesh	Jaswinder Singh
Maharashtra	Ajit Nawale
Manipur	Kshetrimayum Santa
Odisha	Suresh Chandra Panigrahy
Punjab	Sukhwinder Singh Sekhon
Puducherry	S. Ramachandran
Rajasthan	Kishan Pareek
Tamil Nadu	P. Shanmugam
Telangana	John Wesley
Tripura	Jitendra Chaudhury
Uttarakhand	Rajendra Purohit
Uttar Pradesh	Ravi Shankar Mishra
West Bengal	Mohammed Salim

=== Principal mass organisations ===
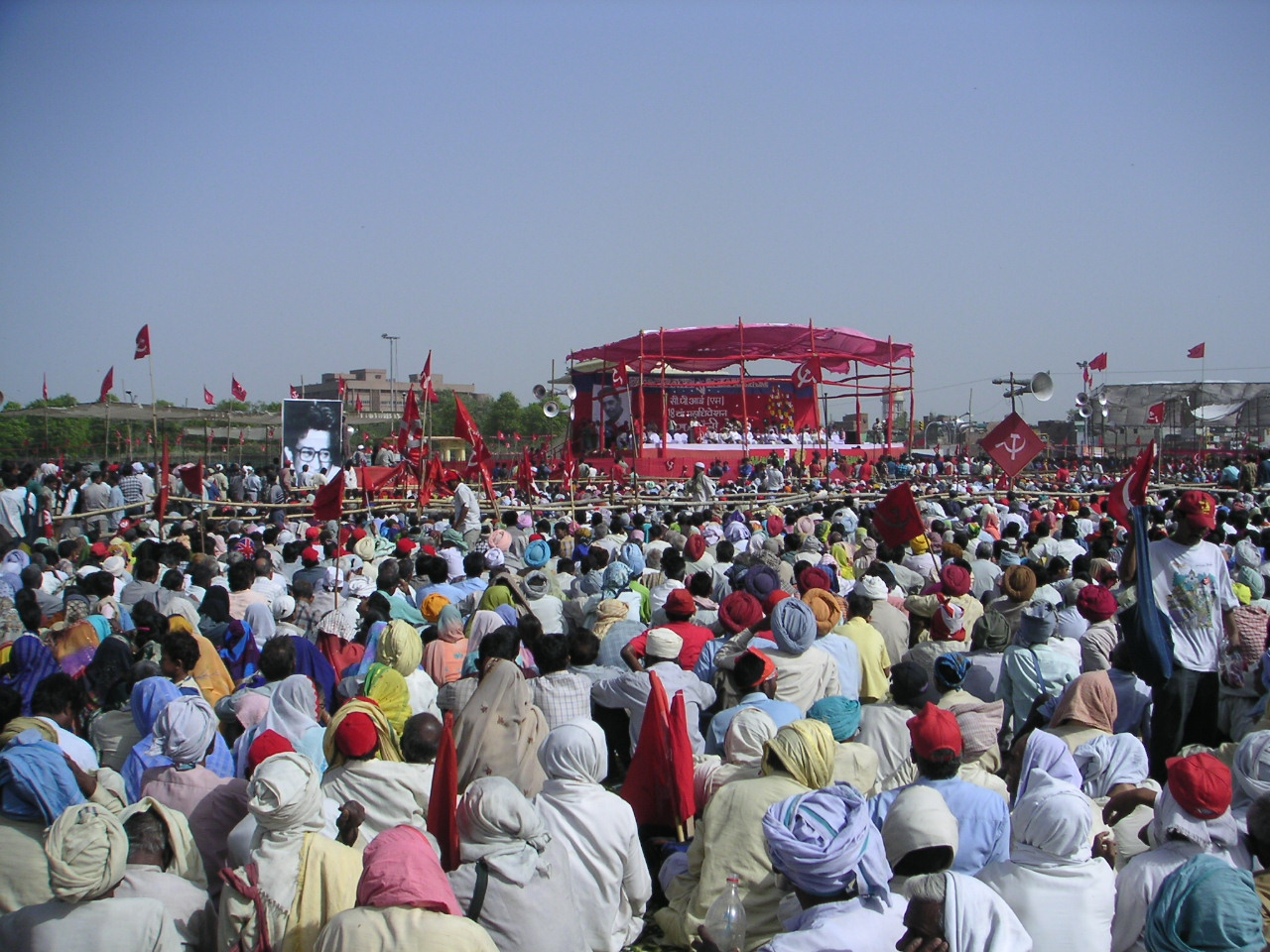
CPI(M) 18th Congress rally in Delhi

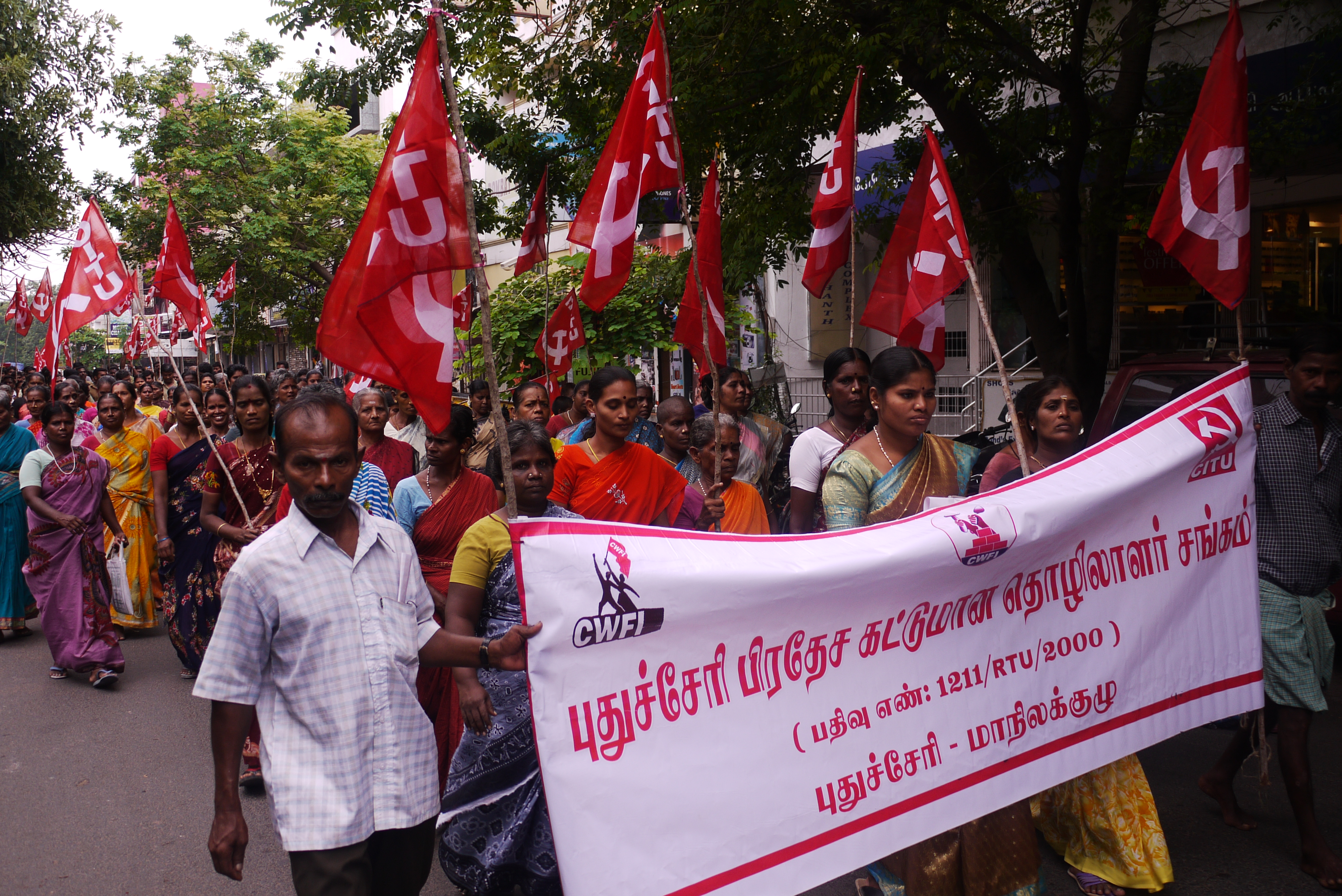
A CITU rally in Pondicherry.

- Democratic Youth Federation of India
- Students' Federation of India
- Centre of Indian Trade Unions
- All India Kisan Sabha
- All India Agricultural Workers Union
- All India Democratic Women's Association
- Balasangam
- Bank Employees Federation of India
- Ganamukti Parishad, Tripura
- Tribal Youth Federation, Tripura
- Adivasi Kshema Samithi, Kerala

=== International affiliation ===
Communist Party of India Marxist is internationally affiliated to IMCWP and Unity for Peace and Socialism. Its members in Great Britain are in the electoral front Unity for Peace and Socialism, with the Communist Party of Britain and the British-domiciled sections of the Communist Party of Bangladesh and the Communist Party of Greece (KKE). It stood 13 candidates in the London-wide list section of the London Assembly elections in May 2008.

== Indian general elections results ==
Performance of Communist Party of India (Marxist) in Loksabha elections
Year	Legislature	Party Secretary	Total constituencies	Seats won / contested	Change in seats	Total votes	Per. of votes	Change in vote %	Party Rank	Outcome	Ref.
1967	4th Lok Sabha	Puchalapalli Sundarayya	520	19 / 59	New	6,246,522	4.28 %	New	6th	Opposition	
1971	5th Lok Sabha	Puchalapalli Sundarayya	518	25 / 85	▲6	7,510,089	5.12 %	▲0.84%	▲2nd	Main Opposition	
1977	6th Lok Sabha	Puchalapalli Sundarayya	542	22 / 53	▼3	8,113,659	4.29 %	▼0.83%	▼3rd	Opposition	
1980	7th Lok Sabha	E. M. S. Namboodiripad	542	37 / 64	▲15	12,352,331	6.24 %	▲1.95%	3rd	Opposition	
1984	8th Lok Sabha	E. M. S. Namboodiripad	541	22 / 64	▼15	14,272,526	5.72 %	▼0.52%	3rd	Opposition	
1989	9th Lok Sabha	E. M. S. Namboodiripad	529	33 / 64	▲11	19,691,309	6.55 %	▲0.83	▼4th	Outside Support	
1991	10th Lok Sabha	E. M. S. Namboodiripad	534	35 / 63	▲2	17,074,699	6.14 %	▼0.41%	4th	Opposition	
1996	11th Lok Sabha	Harkishan Singh Surjeet	543	32 / 75	▼3	20,496,810	6.12 %	▼0.02%	4th	Outside Support	
1998	12th Lok Sabha	Harkishan Singh Surjeet	543	32 / 71	Steady	18,991,867	5.16 %	▼0.96%	▲3rd	Opposition	
1999	13th Lok Sabha	Harkishan Singh Surjeet	543	33 / 72	▲1	19,695,767	5.40 %	▲0.24%	3rd	Opposition	
2004	14th Lok Sabha	Harkishan Singh Surjeet	543	43 / 69	▲10	22,070,614	5.66 %	▲0.26%	3rd	Outside Support	
2009	15th Lok Sabha	Prakash Karat	543	16 / 82	▼27	22,219,111	5.33 %	▼0.33%	▼8th	Opposition	
2014	16th Lok Sabha	Prakash Karat	543	9 / 93	▼7	17,986,773	3.24 %	▼2.09%	▼9th	Opposition	
2019	17th Lok Sabha	Sitaram Yechury	543	3 / 69	▼6	10,744,908	1.75 %	▼1.49%	▼16th	Opposition	
2024	18th Lok Sabha	Sitaram Yechury	543	4 / 52	▲1	11,342,553	1.76%	▲0.01%	▲14th	Opposition	

All time-CPI(M) Lok Sabha seat count

=== 1967 general election ===
In the 1967 Lok Sabha elections, the CPI(M) nominated 59 candidates. In total 19 of them were elected. The party received 6.2 million votes (4.28% of the nationwide vote). By comparison, CPI won 23 seats and got 5.11% of the nationwide vote. In the state legislative elections held simultaneously, the CPI(M) emerged as a major party in Kerala and West Bengal. In Kerala, a United Front government led by E.M.S. Namboodiripad was formed. (Note: In Kerala the United Front consisted, at the time of the election, of Communist Party of India (Marxist), the Communist Party of India, the Muslim League, the Revolutionary Socialist Party, the Karshaka Thozhilali Party and the Kerala Socialist Party.) In West Bengal, the CPI(M) was the main force behind the United Front government formed. The Chief Ministership was given to Ajoy Mukherjee of the Bangla Congress (a regional splinter group of the Indian National Congress).

=== 1971 general election ===
With the backdrop of the Bangladesh War and the emerging role of Indira Gandhi as a populist national leader, the 1971 election to the Lok Sabha was held. The CPI(M) contested 85 seats and won in 25. In total the party mustered 7,510,089 votes (5.12% of the national vote). Twenty of the seats came from West Bengal (including Somnath Chatterjee, elected from Burdwan), two from Kerala (including A.K. Gopalan, elected from Palakkad), two from Tripura (Biren Dutta and Dasarath Deb) and one from Andhra Pradesh.

In the same year, state legislative elections were held in three states; West Bengal, Tamil Nadu, and Odisha. In West Bengal CPI(M), had 241 candidates, winning 113 seats. In total the party mustered 4,241,557 votes (32.86% of the statewide vote). In Tamil Nadu CPI(M), contested 37 seats but won none of them, obtaining 259,298 votes (1.65% of the statewide vote). In Odisha, the party contested 11 seats and won in two. The CPI(M) vote in the state was 52,785 (1.2% of the statewide vote). (Note: ECI: Statistical Report on the 1971 Orissa Legislative Election, ECI: Statistical Report on the 1971 Tamil Nadu Legislative Election, ECI: Statistical Report on the 1971 West Bengal Legislative Election)

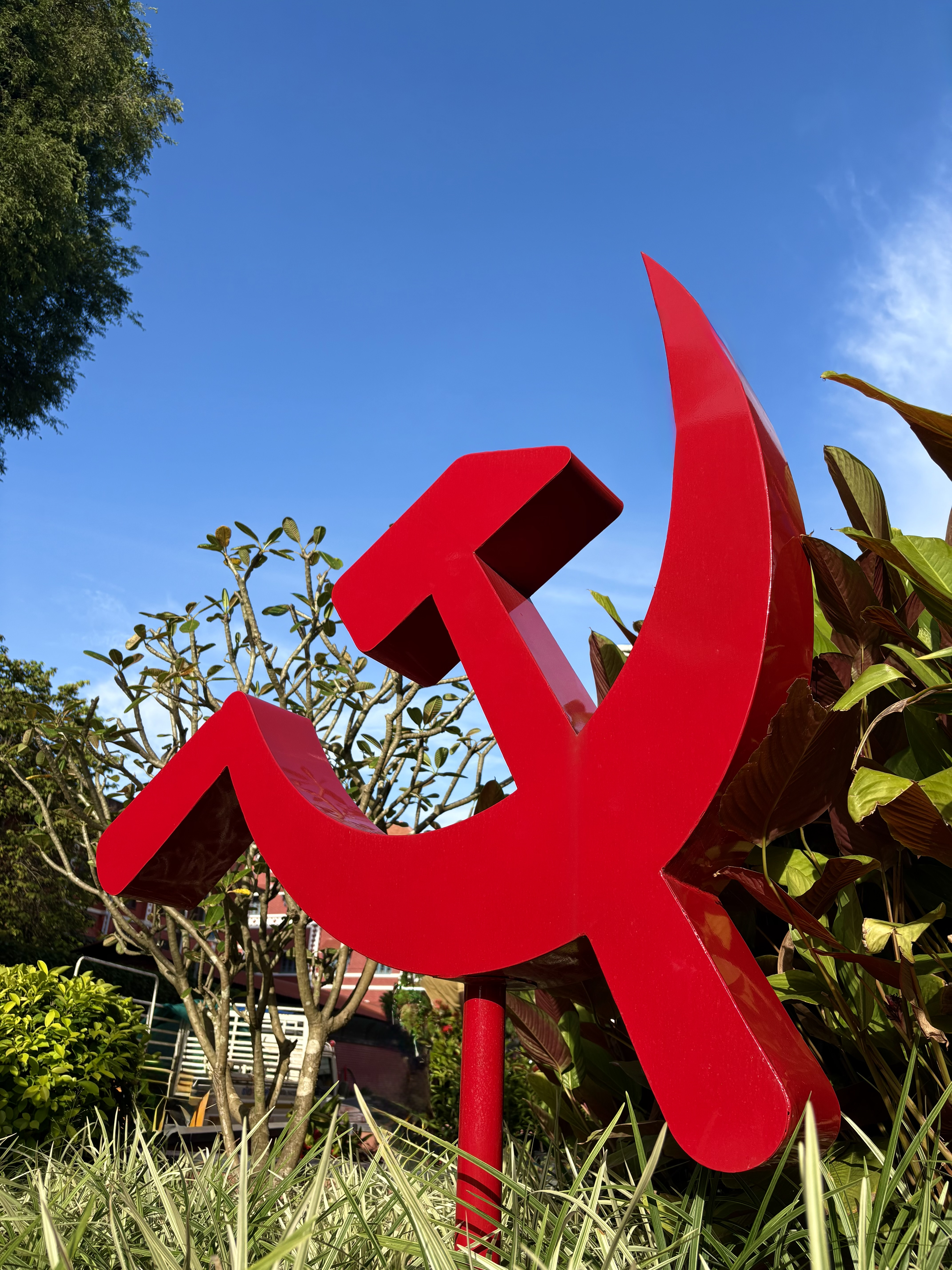
Election symbol of CPIM

=== 1977 general election ===
In the 1977 Lok Sabha election, the CPI(M) fielded its candidates on 53 seats scattered around in 14 states and union territories of India. It won 4.29% of the average votes polled in this election. The party had won 17 seats from West Bengal, three from Maharashtra, and one each from Odisha and Punjab. This election was done shortly after the Emergency imposed by Indira Gandhi and reflected a wide uproar of masses against her draconian rule. A coalition of Opposition parties was formed against the Congress regime; CPI(M) too supported this coalition by not fielding its candidates against the Janta Party.

=== 1980 general elections ===
The Janta Party coalition did not last long, and two years after its formation India faced the 1980 Lok Sabha election. This election saw an increase in the vote percentage of CPI(M) and the party secured more seats than the previous elections. The Party had contested elections in the 15 states and union territories of India and fielded its candidates on 64 seats. The party had won 37 seats in total. It won 28 seats in West Bengal, seven in Kerala, and two seats in Tripura. The party emerged out as the whole sole representative of the people of Tripura in this election.

=== 2014 Lok Sabha election ===
Nine CPI(M) candidates were elected in the 2014 Indian general election, as well as two CPI(M)-supported independents. This is further down from the previous number of 16. The national vote share of CPI(M) has also shrunk from 5.33% in 2009 to mere 3.28% in 2014. This is a significant 38.5% reduction within a span of five years which is consistent with the overall decline of the left in India. CPI(M) did not win a single seat in Tamil Nadu and its seats went down from nine to two in West Bengal where it is being heavily eroded by Mamata Banerjee governed AITC. Kerala is the only state where CPI(M) gained one more seat but this is mainly attributed to the splitting of anti-LDF votes between the UDF and emerging NDA. The NDA saw a sharp spike in vote share in decades which came coupled with a sharp decline in UDF votes. Thus, it is assumed that the NDA cut into UDF votes thereby facilitating victory for LDF. This was again mirrored during the 2016 Kerala Legislative Assembly election, which saw the NDA getting entry into the State Assembly for the first time as BJP veteran O. Rajagopal wins the Nemom seat and CPI(M)'s Pinarayi Vijayan forming the LDF-ruled government.

=== 2019 general election ===
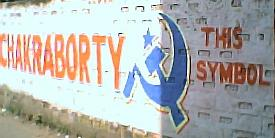
Mural for CPI(M) candidate Sujan Chakraborty in Jadavpur

The CPI(M) contested on 69 seats nationwide and won three in the 2019 general election. One seat was won in Kerala, where the CPI(M) is leading the state government. Two other seats were won in Tamil Nadu, where the CPI(M) contested within the DMK-led coalition.

=== 2024 general election ===
The CPI(M) contested on 52 seats nationwide and won four in the 2024 general election. One seat was won in Kerala, One seat in Rajasthan and two more in Tamil Nadu under the-DMK led coalition.

== Presence in states and politics ==
As of 2026, In Tamil Nadu it has 2 MLAs and provides confidence and supply to TVK government led by Joseph C.Vijay. The Left Front under CPI(M) governed West Bengal for an uninterrupted 34 years (1977–2011) and Tripura for 30 years, including 25 uninterrupted years between 1993 and 2018. The 34 years of Left Front rule in West Bengal is the longest-serving democratically elected communist-led government in the world. CPI(M) currently has three MPs in Lok Sabha. CPI(M)'s highest tally was in 2004 when it got 5.66% of votes polled in and it had 43 MPs. It won 42.31% on an average in the 69 seats it contested. It supported the new Indian National Congress-led United Progressive Alliance government, but without becoming a part of it. On 9 July 2008, it formally withdrew support from the UPA government explaining this by differences about the Indo-US nuclear deal and the IAEA Safeguards Agreement in particular.

=== Current government in State legislative assemblies ===
Sr No.	State	Govt Since	Chief Minister			Alliance Name	Parties in Alliance	Seats in Assembly
Sr No.	State	Govt Since	Name	Party	Party seats	Alliance Name	Parties in Alliance	Seats in Assembly
Alliance Government
1	Jammu and Kashmir	1 October 2024	Omar Abdullah	JKNC	42	INDIA	INC(6)	49 / 95
1	Jammu and Kashmir	1 October 2024	Omar Abdullah	JKNC	42	INDIA	CPI(M) (1)	49 / 95

=== Current seats in State legislative assemblies ===
Seats won by CPI(M) in state legislative assemblies
State legislative assembly	Last election	Contested seats	Seats won	Alliance	Result	Ref.
Bihar Legislative Assembly	2025	4	1 / 243	Mahagathbandhan	Opposition	
Kerala Legislative Assembly	2026	75	26 / 140	Left Democratic Front	Opposition	
Jammu and Kashmir Legislative Assembly	2024	1	1 / 90	INDIA	Coalition	
Maharashtra Legislative Assembly	2024	3	1 / 288	Maha Vikas Aghadi	Opposition	
Odisha Legislative Assembly	2024	7	1 / 147	—N/a	Others	
Tamil Nadu Legislative Assembly	2026	5	2 / 234	Left Front	Outside Support and Supply	
Tripura Legislative Assembly	2023	43	10 / 60	Secular Democratic Front	Opposition	
West Bengal Legislative Assembly	2026	197	1 / 294	Left Front+	—N/a	

=== Presence in Legislatures, Lok Sabha, Rajya Sabha and local bodies by states or union territories ===
==== Andhra Pradesh ====
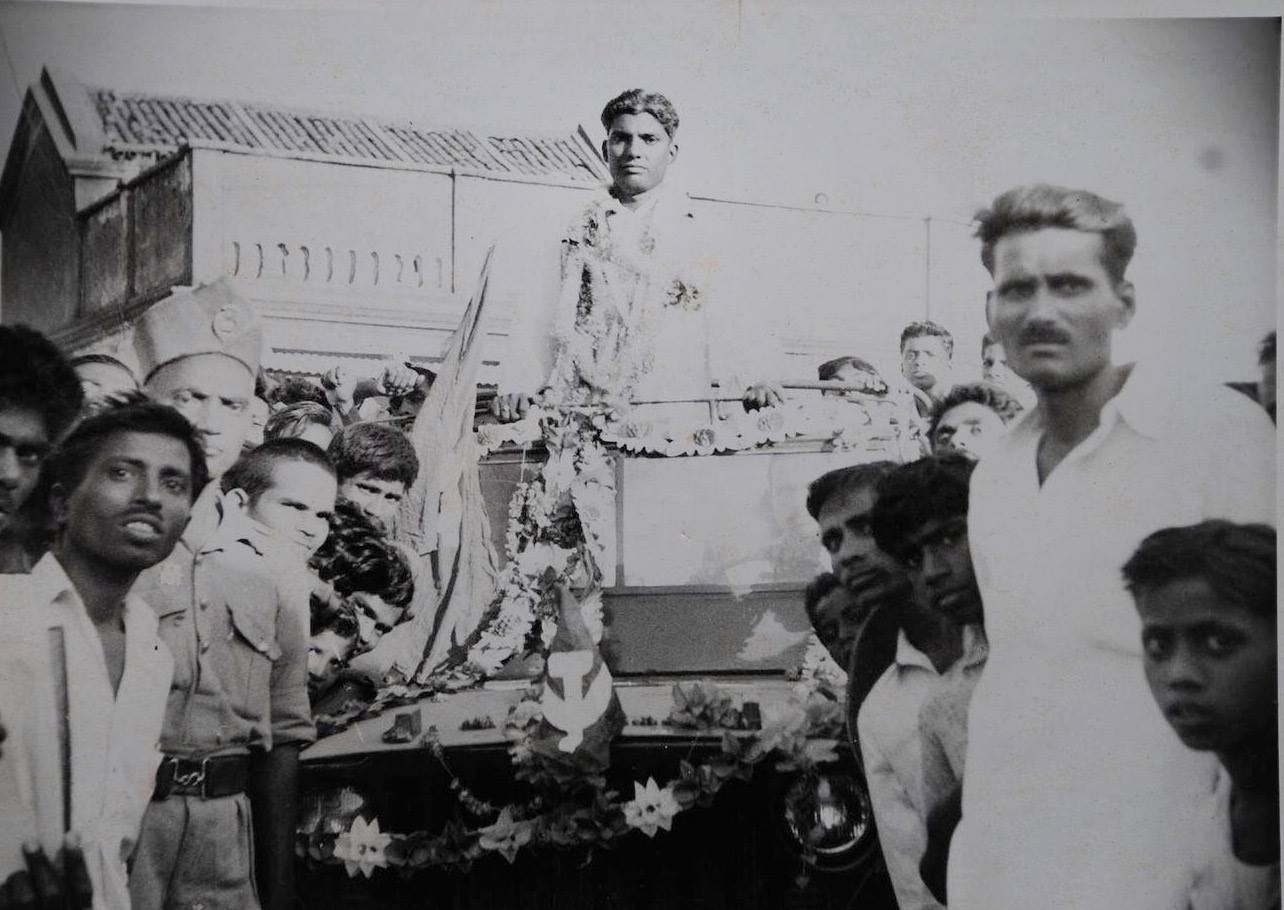
Chennamaneni Rajeshwara Rao in an election rally in 1957.

After formation of CPIM, CPIM came victorious in nine seats in 1967, one seat in 1972, eight seats in 1978, five seats in 1983, 11 seats in 1985, in six seats in 1989, 15 seats in 1994, two seats in 1999, nine seats in 2004 and one seat in 2009. In 2014, CPIM won in one seat, which subsequently went to Telangana state. However, in 2019 CPIM won no seats. CPIM came victorious for many times in local body elections. During the 1988 Lok Sabha election, Tammineni Veerabhadram, one of prominent politicians of CPIM, gathered 352,083 votes (39.01%), finishing in second place, becoming the most voted CPI(M) candidate up to then outside of the left strongholds like West Bengal and Kerala.

CPIM had MPs in Andhra Pradesh rajyasabha multiple times including M. Hanumantha Rao from 1988 to 1994, Yalamanchili Radhakrishna Murthy from 1996 to 2002 and Penumalli Madhu from 2004 to 2010.

==== Assam ====
CPIM has a moderate presence in Assam and had run Government in the state once. CPIM first time entered Assam Legislative Assembly in 1978 by winning 11 seats followed by two seats in 1983, two seats in 1985 and two seats in 1991. In the 1996 elections, CPIM won two seats with 1,76,721 votes. and along with Asom Gana Parishad they were in coalition government headed by Prafulla Kumar Mahanta for 1996–2001. But in 2001 elections, it drew blanks. In 2006, the CPI (M) had won two seats. Ananta Deka, Uddhav Barman represented CPIM from Rangia and Sorbhog seats. In 2011 and in 2016, CPIM drew blanks. In 2021, CPIM made a comeback with Mahajot winning one seat from Sorbhog by a margin of around 10,000 votes. In 2026, CPIM lost its only seat and once again got zero seats in assembly.

In lok sabha from Assam, CPIM first won in 1974 when Nurul Huda was elected in a by-election in Cachar lok sabha constituency in early 1974 by-elections. He defeated the Indian National Congress candidate and former Minister Mahitosh Purkayastha by a margin of 19,944 votes. CPIM had also won one seat in 1980, one seat in 1991 and one seat in 1996.

==== Bihar ====
CPIM Bihar has its large roots in the peasant movements by undivided CPI in the state. Communists were actively involved in various movements from the 1920s. All India Kisan Sabha (AIKS) was founded in 1936, which predominantly became active in Bihar. By 1942, AIKS and communists dominated the peasant movement in the country. The members of AIKS or Kisan Sabha were mostly communists. This created a political and social base for communists in Bihar. Sahajanand Saraswati, Karyanand Sharma, Bhogendra Jha were most notable leaders of the movement. Afterwards Bakasht movement (1946–1952), Madhubani movement, Darbhanga movement mobilised Left politics in the state. Though after 1967, neither CPIM nor CPI(ML), which was formed in 1969, grew as an alternative to CPI until the 2000s.

CPIM won four seats in 1967, three seats in 1969, 18 seats in 1972, four seats in 1977, seats in 1980, one seat in 1985, six seats in 1990, two seats in 1995, two seats in 2000, one seat in February 2005, and a seat in October 2005. The party drew blanks in 2010 and 2015; however it did come back in 2020 elections by winning two seats. CPIM fought election in alliance with Rastriya Janata Dal and fared well. It is also speculated that if more seats were given to the left parties, the election could be won with majority.

CPIM had representatives in Lok Sabha from Bihar only for three times: 1999, 1991 and 1989; each year, it won only one Lok Sabha seat. CPIM also has good presence in the panchayats.

CPIM supported JD(U), RJD and INC to form coalition government in Bihar in August, 2022. However, it did not take part in the government.

==== Chhattisgarh ====
CPIM registered its first victory in polls in the Chhattisgarh state in the 2019 municipal corporation elections, in which it bagged two wards. Surthi Kuldeep won Bairotil ward and Rajkumari won in Monkre ward.

==== Gujarat ====
CPIM has a limited presence in Gujarat. The party never won any Vidhan Sabha or Lok Sabha seat from Gujarat, though a bit number of panchayat seats are often won. But in 2020, CPIM's student wing SFI historically won the elections of Central University of Gujarat, which is considered as a right-wing bastion in India.

==== Himachal Pradesh ====
CPIM has the presence in Himachal Pradesh in areas like Summer Hill, Shimla city, Theog etc. CPIM's student wing SFI has considerably presence in the Himachal Pradesh University. CPIM had representatives in the Himachal Pradesh Legislative Assembly in 1967 and 1993. In 1993, Rakesh Singha won from Shimla seat. However, CPIM managed to win many seats in the municipal and panchayat elections.

In 2012, Shimla Municipal Corporation election, CPI(M) won the posts of Mayor and Deputy Mayor in Shimla Municipal Corporation with a huge majority with a total of 3 seats.

In 2016, CPIM won 42 seats out of 331 seats contested and received only two district panchayats. In the 2017 Shimla Municipal Corporation election, CPI(M) managed to win only one seat despite being a kingmaker in previous elections.

In 2017, CPIM made a comeback in Himachal Pradesh Legislative Assembly after 24 years by winning Theog assembly seat. Rakesh Singha, a former CPIM Central Committee member won the seat by a margin of 1,983 seats. CPIM contested for 14 seats in the election. After the election, the presence in state started to increase.

In 2021, panchayat elections, CPIM increased its tally by jumping to 337 seats. 12 zila parishad (ZP) members, 25 panchayat samiti members, 28 panchayat pradhans, 30 vice-pradhans and 242 ward members got elected from CPIM. Also, CPIM candidates got elected for president in 25 panchayats and vice-president in 30 panchayats.

==== Karnataka ====
CPIM has not won any seat in Karnataka since 2004. In 2004, CPIM won one seat; in 1994, it won one seat; in 1985, it won two seats and in 1983, it won two seats in the Karnataka Legislative Assembly.

==== Kerala ====
Kerala has a strong presence of CPIM and left parties in its politics and society. CPIM had the most of its electoral success from Kerala after 2011. After 2021 Kerala Legislative Assembly election, it historically formed Government twice breaking the 40 year old political practice of the state. CPIM currently has 26 seats in the assembly.

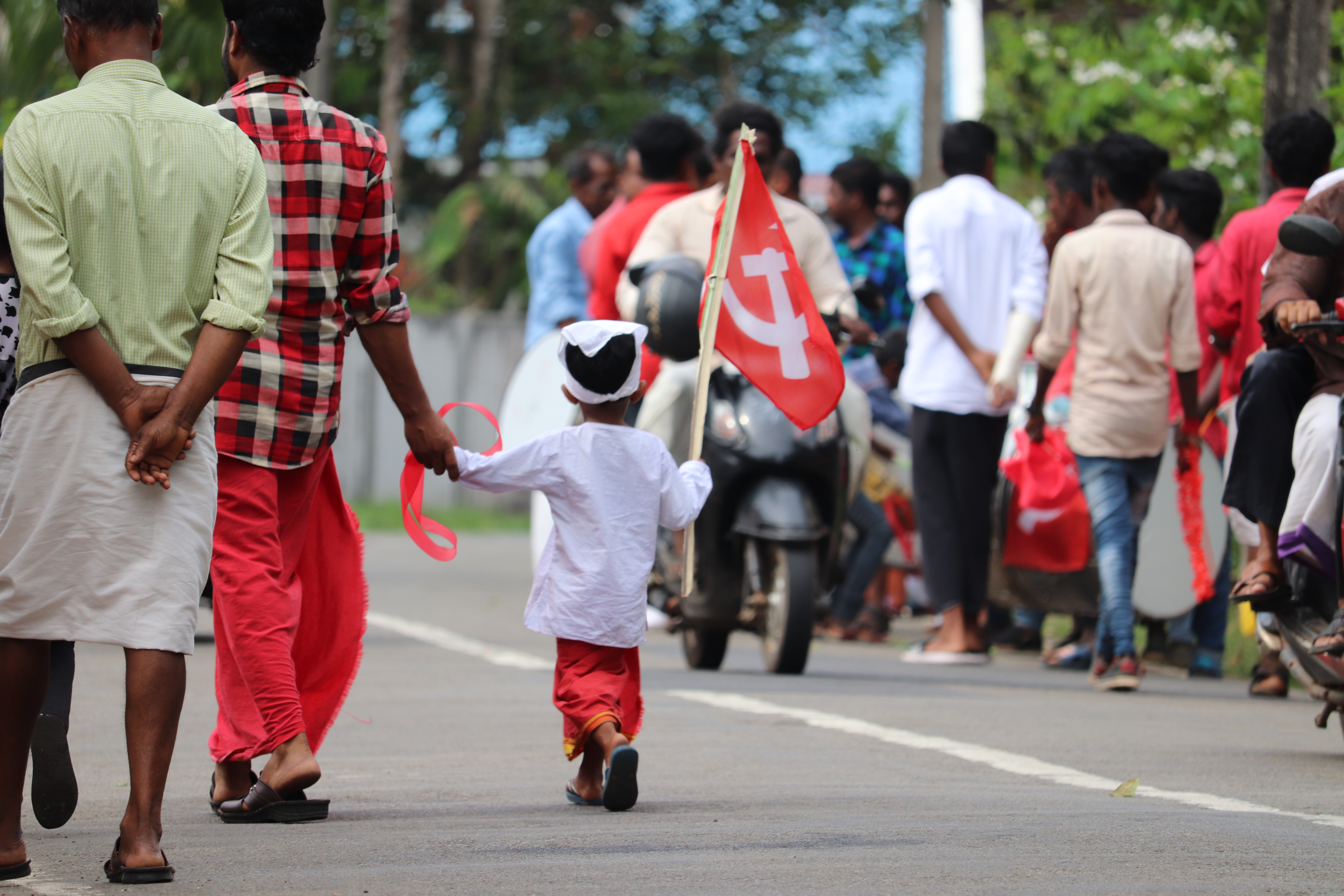
A Child from Kerala holding Communist Party of India (Marxist) Flag

In Kerala, the CPIM has pursued a policy of massive investment in poverty alleviation, including the distribution of procurement cards that provide almost free access to basic foodstuffs and the introduction of a minimum wage twice the national average, as well as in education and health. According to geographer Srikumar Chattopadhyay, "The communists also strongly developed the panchayat system, the village councils that allow everyone to participate in the development of the state."

==== Madhya Pradesh ====
CPIM has entered in Madhya Pradesh Legislative Assembly twice. In 1993 and 2003 CPIM won Sirmour Assembly constituency.

==== Maharashtra ====
Currently the party has one representative in Maharashtra Legislative Assembly. CPI(M) candidate Comrade Vinod Nikole, an Adivasi leader and CPI(M) Maharashtra State Committee member won the Dahanu by a margin of 4,742 votes. As of 2020, he is also the State Secretary and Thane-Palghar District Secretary of the Centre of Indian Trade Unions (CITU). Notably, the seat was won by CPIM simultaneously from 1978 with just a single exception of 2014.

==== Manipur ====
CPIM never won a single seat in Manipur since the party participated in 1995 Legislative Assembly election for the first time in the state. Currently, CPIM is a part of Manipur Progressive Secular Alliance, an alliance led by Indian National Congress.

==== Odisha ====
Presently, CPIM has only one representative in Odisha Legislative Assembly from Bonai.

==== Punjab ====
The Communist Party of India (Marxist) in Punjab has an eventful history, connected with the state's socio-political landscape and its struggle for workers' rights, agrarian reforms, and social justice. The roots of the CPI(M) in Punjab can be traced back to the early 20th century with the emergence of various revolutionary movements. Two significant organizations that played a crucial role in shaping the communist movement in Punjab were the Gaddar Party, formed in 1913, and the Lal Communist Party, established in 1928. While the Gaddar Party aimed at seeking India's independence from British colonial rule through armed resistance, the Lal Communist Party focused on empowering peasants and labourers through revolutionary means.

After India gained independence in 1947, the Communist Party of India (CPI) was formed through the amalgamation of various leftist groups, including the Lal Communist Party. However, ideological differences within the CPI led to a split, resulting in the formation of the Communist Party of India (Marxist) or CPI(M) in 1964. The CPI(M) in Punjab has consistently advocated for land reforms, workers' rights, and social equality. It has garnered support among the rural and urban poor, particularly in areas with a strong agrarian base. The party actively participated in various social and political movements, aiming to uplift the marginalized sections of society and improve their living conditions.

During the 1980s, Punjab faced a crisis with the rise of the Khalistan movement, seeking a separate Sikh state. The Khalistan movement posed a significant challenge to not only the Indian state but also to Punjab. During this period, the CPI(M) opposed the Khalistan movement and stood for a united India. In the late 1990s, the CPI(M) faced internal divisions, leading to a significant split. One prominent faction led by Mangat Ram Pasla formed a new party called the Communist Party of Marxist (CPM) in Punjab, pursuing its own ideological path. This internal rift had an impact on the party's organizational structure and electoral presence.

Over the years, the CPI(M) experienced a waning presence on the electoral front in Punjab. The changing political dynamics, rise of regional parties, and the diminishing appeal of communist ideology in a globalized world contributed to its reduced influence in electoral politics. Despite the challenges, the Communist Party of India (Marxist) in Punjab continues to be active in advocating for workers' and peasants' rights and participating in social and political movements. Its history reflects the complexities of Punjab's political landscape and its contribution to the larger communist movement in India.

==== Rajasthan ====
In the 2008 Rajasthan Legislative Assembly election, CPIM secured three seats from Anupgarh, Dhod and Danta Ramgarh. Along with six other parties, CPIM formed Loktantrik Morcha in 2013. However, CPIM could not win any seats in the 2013 Legislative Assembly election. The party made a comeback in the state by winning two seats out 28 seats they contested in the 2018 Legislative Assembly election.

==== Tamil Nadu ====
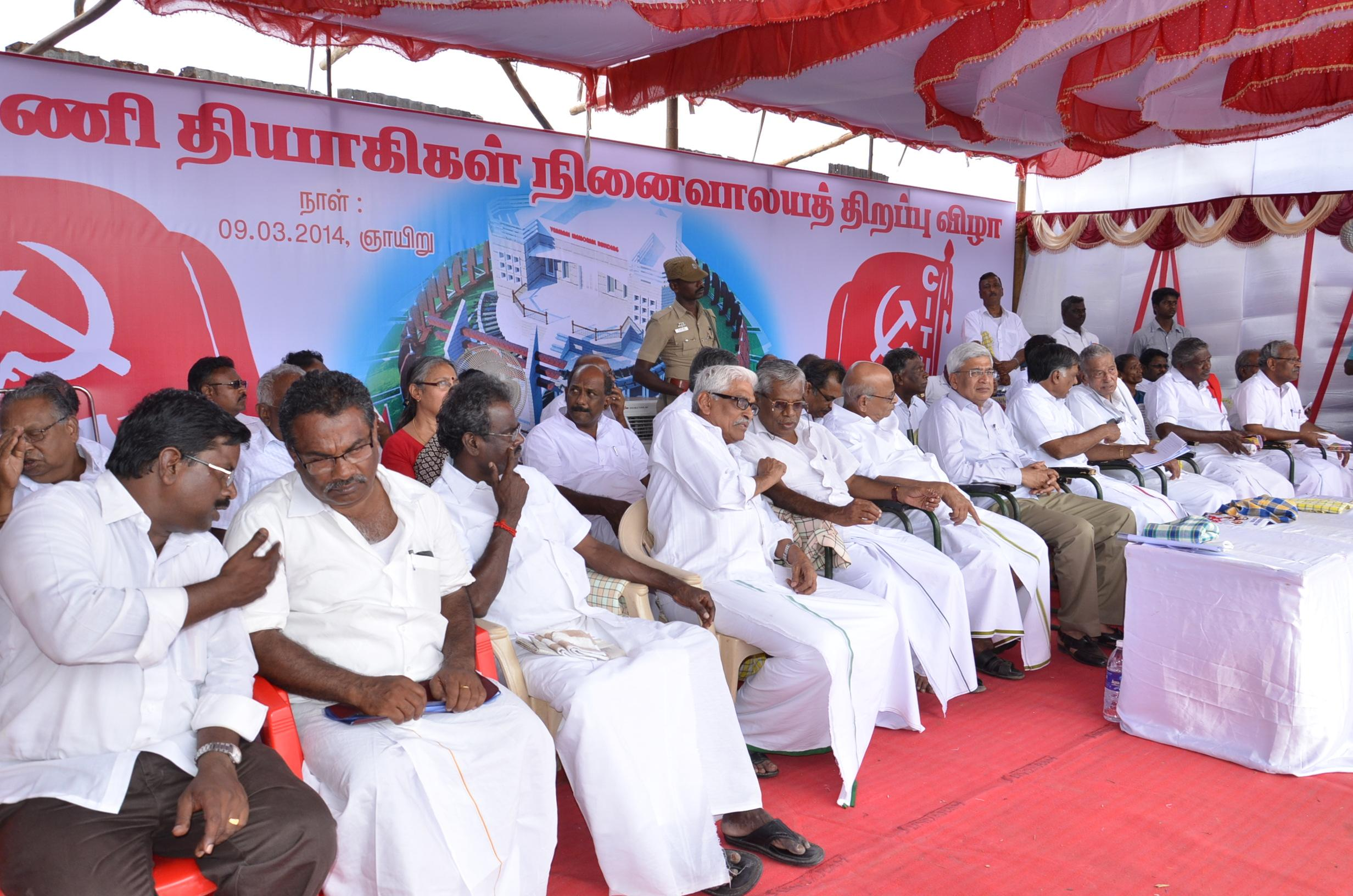
Members of CPI(M) Tamil Nadu during an inauguration ceremony of a building

CPIM, as a part of Dravida Munnetra Kazhagam front in 1989 Tamil Nadu Legislative Assembly election, won 15 seats. In 2006, CPIM was the part of the alliance led by DMK. The party contested in 13 seats and won nine seats. In the next election, CPIM joined All India Anna Dravida Munnetra Kazhagam coalition and won 10 seats out of the 12 seats they contested. However, the party was unable to secure any seats in the 2016 election. In 2019 Indian general election, CPIM won two seats from Coimbatore and Madurai in Tamil Nadu. In 2021 Tamil Nadu Legislative Assembly election, CPIM made a comeback by winning two seats. In 2022, CPI(M) won many seats in the municipal corporation elections. T. Nagarajan of CPI(M) got the post of Deputy Mayor in Madurai Municipal Corporation.

==== Telangana ====
In 2014, CPIM won in one seat in Andhra Pradesh, which subsequently went to Telangana state. However, in 2018 election CPIM won no seats. In the 2022 Munugode by-election, CPIM supported the candidate fielded by Bharat Rashtra Samithi. In 2023, CPIM allianced with BRS to contest election, but didn't.

== State legislative assembly election results ==
=== Andhra Pradesh ===
Election Year	Overall votes	% of overall votes	Total seats	seats won/ seats contensted	+/- in seats	+/- in vote share	Sitting side
Andhra Pradesh Legislative Assembly
2024	43,012	0.13	175	0 / 8	—	▼0.19%	—
2019	1,01,071	0.32%	175	0 / 7	▼1	▼0.52	—N/a
2014	4,07,376	0.84%	175	1 / 68	Steady	▼0.59	—N/a
2009	6,03,407	1.43%	294	1 / 18	▼8	▼0.49	—N/a
2004	6,56,721	1.84%	294	9 / 14	▲7	▲0.14	—N/a
1999	5,67,761	1.70%	294	2 / 48	▼14	▼1.26	—N/a
1994	9,23,204	2.96%	294	15 / 16	▲9	▲0.50	—N/a
1989	7,07,686	2.96%	294	6 / 15	▼5	▲0.15	—N/a
1985	5,30,349	2.69%	294	11 / 11	▲6	▲0.20	—N/a

=== Assam ===
Election Year	Overall votes	% of overall votes	Total seats	seats won/ seats contensted	+/- in seats	+/- in vote share	Sitting side
Assam Legislative Assembly
2026	102,190	0.48%	126	0 / 2	▼1	▼0.36	—N/a
2021	160,758	0.84%	126	1 / 2	▲1	▲0.29	Opposition
2016	93,506	0.55%	126	0 / 19	Steady	Steady	—N/a

=== Bihar ===
Election Year	Overall votes	% of overall votes	Total seats	seats won/ seats contensted	+/- in seats	+/- in vote share	Sitting side
Bihar Legislative Assembly
2025	302,974	0.61%	243	1 / 4	▼1	▼0.04%	Opposition
2020	274,155	0.65%	243	2 / 4	▲2	▲0.04%	Opposition
2015	232,149	0.61%	243	0 / 43	Steady	▼0.21	—N/a

=== Gujarat ===
Election Year	Overall votes	% of overall votes	Total seats	seats won/ seats contensted	+/- in seats	+/- in vote share	Sitting side
Gujarat Legislative Assembly
2022	10,647	0.03%	182	0 / 9	Steady	▼0.01%	—N/a

=== Haryana ===
Election Year	Overall votes	% of overall votes	Total seats	seats won/ seats contensted	+/- in seats	+/- in vote share	Sitting side
Haryana Legislative Assembly
2024	34,373	0.25%	90	0 / 1	—	▲0.18%	—

=== Himachal Pradesh ===
Election Year	Overall votes	% of overall votes	Total seats	seats won/ seats contensted	+/- in seats	+/- in vote share	Sitting side
Himachal Pradesh Legislative Assembly
2022	27,812	0.66%	68	0 / 11	▼1	▼0.81%	Steady
2017	55,558	1.5%	68	1 / 14	▲1	▼0.1%	—N/a

=== Jammu and Kashmir ===
Election Year	Overall votes	% of overall votes	Total seats	seats won/ seats contensted	+/- in seats	+/- in vote share	Sitting side
Jammu and Kashmir Legislative Assembly
2024	33,634	0.6%	90	1 / 1	-	▲0.1%	Coalition
2014	24,017	0.5%	87	1 / 3	—	▼0.3%	Opposition

=== Kerala ===
Election Year	Overall votes	% of overall votes	Total seats	seats won/ seats contensted	+/- in seats	+/- in vote share	Sitting side
Kerala Legislative Assembly
2026	47,00,662	21.77%	140	26 / 75	▼36	▼3.61	Opposition
2021	5,288,502	25.38%	140	62 / 77	▲4	▼1.14	Government
2016	5,365,472	26.7%	140	59 / 84	▲14	▼1.48	Government
2011	4,921,354	28.18%	140	45 / 84	▼16	▼2.27	Opposition
2006	4,732,381	30.45%	140	61 / 84	▲37	▲6.60	Government
2001	3,752,976	23.85%	140	24 / 74	▼16	▲2.26	Opposition
1996	3,078,723	21.59%	140	40 / 62	▲12	▲0.15	Government
1991	3,082,354	21.74%	140	28 / 64	▼10	▼2.12	Opposition
1987	2,912,999	22.86%	140	38 / 70	▲12	▲4.06	Government
1982	1,798,198	18.80%	140	26 / 51	▼9	▼0.55	Opposition
1980	1,846,312	19.35%	140	35 / 50	▲18	▼2.83	Government
1977	1,946,051	22.18%	140	17 / 68	▼12	▼1.65	Opposition
1970	1,794,213	23.83%	140	29 / 73	▼23	▲0.32	Opposition
1967	1,476,456	23.51%	140	52 / 59	▲12	▲3.64	Government
1965	1,257,869	19.87%	140	40 / 73	New	New	—N/a

=== Maharashtra ===
Election Year	Overall votes	% of overall votes	Total seats	seats won/ seats contensted	+/- in seats	+/- in vote share	Sitting side
Maharashtra Legislative Assembly
2024	222,277	0.3%	288	1 / 3	Steady	Steady	Opposition
2019	204,933	0.37%	288	1 / 8	Steady	▼0.02%	Opposition
2014	207,933	0.39%	288	1 / 20	Steady	▼0.21%	—N/a
2009	270,052	0.60%	288	1 / 20	▼2	▼0.02%	—N/a

=== Odisha ===
Election Year	Overall votes	% of overall votes	Total seats	seats won/ seats contensted	+/- in seats	+/- in vote share	Sitting side
Odisha Legislative Assembly
2024	93,295	0.37%	147	1 / 7	—	▲0.07%	—
2019	70,119	0.32%	147	1 / 8	Steady	—N/a	—N/a
2014	80,274	0.40%	147	1 / 8	Steady	—N/a	—N/a

=== Punjab ===
Election Year	Overall votes	% of overall votes	Total seats	seats won/ seats contensted	+/- in seats	+/- in vote share	Sitting side
Punjab Legislative Assembly
2022	9,503	0.06%	117	0 / 14	—N/a	—N/a	—N/a

=== Rajasthan ===
Election Year	Overall votes	% of overall votes	Total seats	seats won/ seats contensted	+/- in seats	+/- in vote share	Sitting side
Rajasthan Legislative Assembly
2023	382,387	0.96%	200	0 / 17	▼2	▼0.24	—N/a
2018	434,210	1.2%	200	2 / 28	▲2	▲0.33	—N/a
2013	629,002	0.9%	200	0 / 38	▼3	▼0.7	—N/a

=== Tamil Nadu ===
Election Year	Overall votes	% of overall votes	Total seats	seats won/ seats contensted	+/- in seats	+/- in vote share	Sitting side
Tamil Nadu Legislative Assembly
2026	2,93,817	0.6%	234	2 / 5	Steady	▼0.25	Outside Support
2021	3,90,819	0.85%	234	2 / 6	▲2	▲0.13	Government
2016	3,07,303	0.72%	234	0 / 25	▼10	▼1.58	—N/a
2011	8,88,364	2.40%	234	10 / 12	▲1	▼0.3	Government
2006	8,72,674	2.70%	234	9 / 13	▼10	▲0.33	Government

=== Telangana ===
Election Year	Overall votes	% of overall votes	Total seats	seats won/ seats contensted	+/- in seats	+/- in vote share	Sitting side
Telangana Legislative Assembly
2023	52,364	0.22%	119	0 / 19	▼2	▼0.18%	—N/a
2018	91,099	0.40%	119	2 / 28	▼1	—N/a	—N/a

=== Tripura ===
Election Year	Overall votes	% of overall votes	Total seats	seats won/ seats contensted	+/- in seats	+/- in vote share	Sitting side
Tripura Legislative Assembly
2023	6,22,829	24.62%	60	11 / 43	▼5	▼17.6	Opposition
2018	9,93,605	42.22%	60	16 / 57	▼33	▼5.51	Opposition
2013	10,59,327	48.11%	60	49 / 57	▲3	▲0.01	Government
2008	9,03,009	48.01%	60	46 / 56	▲8	▲1.10	Government
2003	7,11,119	46.82%	60	38 / 55	Steady	▲1.30	Government
1998	6,21,804	45.49%	60	38 / 55	▲6	▲0.80	Government
1993	5,99,943	44.78%	60	44 / 51	▲18	▼0.40	Government
1988	5,20,697	45.82%	60	26 / 55	▼11	▲0.10	Opposition

=== Uttar Pradesh ===
Election Year	Overall votes	% of overall votes	Total seats	seats won/ seats contensted	+/- in seats	+/- in vote share	Sitting side
Uttar Pradesh Legislative Assembly
2022	5,617	0.01%	403	0 / 1	—N/a	▼0.03	—N/a

=== West Bengal ===
Election Year	Overall votes	% of overall votes	Total seats	seats won/ seats contensted	+/- in seats	+/- in vote share	Sitting side
West Bengal Legislative Assembly
2026	2,818,360	4.45%	294	1 / 197	▲1	▼0.28	—N/a
2021	2,837,276	4.73%	294	0 / 136	▼26	▼15.02	—N/a
2016	10,802,058	19.75%	294	26 / 148	▼14	▼10.35	Opposition
2011	14,330,061	30.08%	294	40 / 213	▼136	▼7.05	Opposition
2006	14,652,200	37.13%	294	176 / 212	▲33	▲0.54	Government
2001	13,402,603	36.59%	294	143 / 211	▼14	▼1.33	Government
1996	13,670,198	37.16%	294	153 / 213	▼32	▲1.05	Government
1991	11,418,822	36.87%	294	182 / 204	▲2	▼2.43	Government
1987	10,285,723	39.12%	294	187 / 212	▲13	▲0.89	Government
1982	8,655,371	38.49%	294	174 / 209	▼4	▲3.03	Government
1977	5,080,828	35.46%	294	178 / 224	▲164	▲8.01	Government

== Indian Presidential elections ==
=== 2002 presidential election ===
In the 2002 Presidential election, Left Front announced Captain Lakshmi Sehgal as its presidential candidate. Against her was the ruling Bharatiya Janata Party's candidate A. P. J. Abdul Kalam. CPI(M)'s leadership announced that in form of Captain Lakshmi, they were fielding an 'Alternative Candidate'. They said that though it was clear that Captain Lakshmi could not become president because of the opposition of the BJP-led National Democratic Alliance (NDA) and the Indian National Congress to her, yet through this Presidential Election, the Left wished to raise key national issues and make them heard by the masses. Captain Lakshmi herself pointed out that this Presidential election reflected the opposition of the Indian Left to the communal-sectarian politics of BJP, and the Left's solidarity with the religious minorities who had suffered greatly under the NDA's leadership.

=== 2012 Presidential election ===
While CPI(M) supported Pranab Mukherjee as presidential candidate in 2012 presidential election, it was in favour of a non-Congress candidate for the post of the Vice-President.

== List of chief ministers from CPI(M) ==
Key
†	Denotes the person is the incumbent chief minister

No.	Name	Portrait	Term of office		Days in office
Kerala
1	E. M. S. Namboodiripad	A portrait of E.M.S. Namboodiripad	6 March 1967	1 November 1969	2 years 240 days
2	E. K. Nayanar		25 January 1980	20 October 1981	10 years 353 days
2	E. K. Nayanar		26 March 1987	23 June 1991	10 years 353 days
2	E. K. Nayanar		20 May 1996	16 May 2001	10 years 353 days
3	V. S. Achuthanandan	A photograph of V.S. Achutanandan	18 May 2006	17 May 2011	4 years 364 days
4	Pinarayi Vijayan		25 May 2016	20 May 2021	9 years, 358 days
4	Pinarayi Vijayan		20 May 2021	18 May 2026	9 years, 358 days
Tripura
1	Nripen Chakraborty		5 January 1978	4 February 1983	10 years 31 days
1	Nripen Chakraborty		5 February 1983	5 February 1988	10 years 31 days
2	Dasarath Deb		10 April 1993	11 March 1998	4 years, 335 days
3	Manik Sarkar		11 March 1998	26 February 2003	19 years 363 days
3	Manik Sarkar		27 February 2003	23 February 2008	19 years 363 days
3	Manik Sarkar		24 February 2008	14 February 2013	19 years 363 days
3	Manik Sarkar		15 February 2013	8 March 2018	19 years 363 days
West Bengal
1	Jyoti Basu		21 June 1977	23 May 1982	23 years 137 days
1	Jyoti Basu		24 May 1982	29 March 1987	23 years 137 days
1	Jyoti Basu		30 March 1987	18 June 1991	23 years 137 days
1	Jyoti Basu		19 June 1991	15 May 1996	23 years 137 days
1	Jyoti Basu		16 May 1996	5 November 2000	23 years 137 days
2	Buddhadeb Bhattacharya		6 November 2000	14 May 2001	10 years, 195 days
2	Buddhadeb Bhattacharya		15 May 2001	17 May 2006	10 years, 195 days
2	Buddhadeb Bhattacharya		18 May 2006	20 May 2011	10 years, 195 days

== List of Rajya Sabha members ==
Current Rajya Sabha members from CPI(M)
Name	State	Appointment date	Retirement date
**John Brittas**	Kerala	4 April 2021	23 April 2027
V. Sivadasan	Kerala	24 April 2021	23 April 2027
A. A. Rahim	Kerala	3 April 2022	2 April 2028

- **Bold** indicates CPI(M) leader in Rajya Sabha

== List of Lok Sabha members ==
Current Lok Sabha (18th) members from CPI(M)
Name	Constituency	State
**K. Radhakrishnan**	Alathur	Kerala
R. Sachithanantham	Dindigul	Tamil Nadu
S. Venkatesan	Madurai	Tamil Nadu
Amra Ram	Sikar	Rajasthan

== Splits and offshoots ==
A large number of parties have been formed as a result of splits from the CPI(M), such as

- CPI(ML)
- CPI(ML)L
- CPI(ML)RF
- RMPI
- MCPI(U)
- PDS in West Bengal,
- OCP in Odisha
- CMP(J) in Kerala
- Janganotantrik Morcha in Tripura
- Lok Sangharsh Morcha in Punjab

== See also ==
- Communist Party of India (Marxist), West Bengal
- Communist Party of India (Marxist), Kerala
- Communist Party of India (Marxist), Tripura
- Communist Party of India (Marxist), Tamil Nadu
- List of political parties in India
- List of communist parties in India
- List of communist parties
- Left Front (West Bengal)
- Left Democratic Front (Kerala)
- Left Front (West Bengal)
- Left Front (Tripura)
- Politics of India

== Sources ==
- Basu, Jyoti (1999). Memoirs – A Political Autobiography. Calcutta: National Book Agency.
- Basu, Pradip (2000). Towards Naxalbari (1953–1967) – An Account of Inner-Party Ideological Struggle. Calcutta: Progressive Publishers.
- Bose, Shanti Shekar (2005). A Brief Note on the Contents of Documents of the Communist Movement in India. Kolkata: National Book Agency.
- Rao, M.V.S. Koteswara (2003). Communist Parties and United Front – Experience in Kerala and West Bengal. Hyderabad, India: Prajasakti Book House..
