= R. N. Upadhyaya =

Indian politician and trade unionist

R. N. Upadhyaya was an Indian politician and trade unionist. He joined the Hindustan Socialist Republican Army in 1938. In 1940 he became a member of the Revolutionary Socialist Party. He participated in the August 1942 Quit India movement. He was jailed for his role in the independence struggle, and was released in 1946. He joined the Communist Party of India in 1952.

During the 1964 split in the Communist Party of India, he sided with the Communist Party of India (Marxist). When CPI(M) was subsequently divided, he belonged to the group that supported the Naxalbari uprising and was expelled from CPI(M) mid-1967. He joined the Communist Party of India (Marxist-Leninist). He was a delegate, representing Uttar Pradesh, at the 1970 party congress of CPI(ML). He took part in organizing the CPI(ML) Uttar Pradesh State Conference in Muzaffarnagar, at which Charu Majumdar participated. Within he shared the positions of Satya Narayan Singh who opposed Majumdar's dominance over the party.

Upadhyaya was an active trade unionist. He led a strike of cigarette factory workers in Saharanpur in 1973. Following the strike he was imprisoned for six months. He worked with the trade union at Mansurpur Sugar Factory. As CPI(ML) collapsed in the 1970s, Upadhyaya rejoined CPI. The 1981 conference of the Uttar Pradesh Trade Union Council (of AITUC) elected Upadhyaya as one of its vice presidents.

In 1997 he joined the Communist Party of India (Marxist-Leninist) Liberation, and became the Uttar Pradesh President of the All India Central Council of Trade Unions.

Upadhyaya died on 18 November 2003 at PGI Hospital in Lucknow.
