= V. Srinivasa Rao =

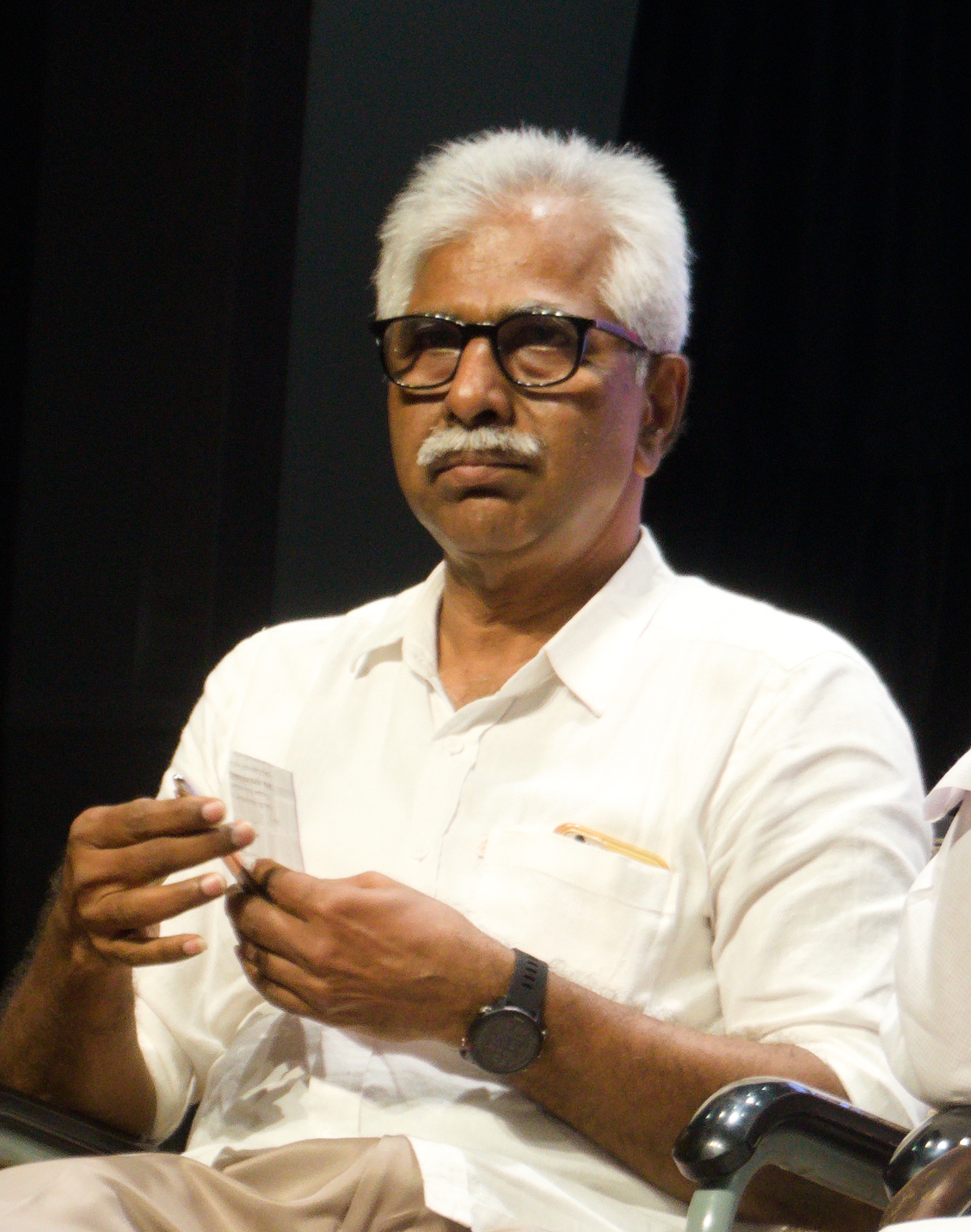

Member of Central Committee, Communist Party of India (Marxist)
- Incumbent
- Assumed office 11 April 2005

Secretary of Communist Party of India (Marxist), Andhra Pradesh
- Incumbent
- Assumed office 29 December 2021
- Preceded by: Penumalli Madhu

Personal details
- Party: Communist Party of India (Marxist)
- Occupation: Politician

Vankayalapati Srinivasa Rao or Srinivasa Rao is an Indian communist politician and the current Secretary of the Communist Party of India (Marxist), Andhra Pradesh. He was first elected as the state secretary in the 26th state conference in December 2021 and then re-elected again in the 27th state conference in February 2025. He is serving as the Central Committee of the party since 11 April 2005. He was formerly member of CPIM Central Secretariat.
