= Bharatiya Janata Party – West Bengal =

West Bengal affiliate of the BJP

- Abbreviation: BJP
- Leader: Suvendu Adhikari (Chief Minister)
- President: Samik Bhattacharya
- General Secretary: Amitava Chakravorty
- Founder: Atal Bihari Vajpayee; Lal Krishna Advani; Murli Manohar Joshi; Nanaji Deshmukh; K. R. Malkani; Sikandar Bakht; Vijay Kumar Malhotra; Vijaya Raje Scindia; Bhairon Singh Shekhawat; Shanta Kumar; Ram Jethmalani; Jagannathrao Joshi
- Headquarters: 6, Muralidhar Sen Lane, College Square, Kolkata-700073, West Bengal
- Newspaper: Banga Kamal Barta
- Student wing: None
- Youth wing: Bharatiya Janata Yuva Morcha, West Bengal
- Women's wing: BJP Mahila Morcha, West Bengal
- Ideology: National conservatism; Hindutva; Right-wing populism; Neoliberalism
- Political position: Right-wing to far-right
- Colours: Saffron
- Slogan: Joy Maa Kali, Joy Maa Durga, Joy Shree Ram ("Victory to Mother Kali, victory to Mother Durga, victory to Shri Ram")
- Alliance: National Democratic Alliance
- Seats in West Bengal Legislative Assembly: 209 / 294
- Seats in Rajya Sabha: 7 / 16
- Seats in Lok Sabha: 12 / 42

Election symbol

Party flag

Website
- bjpbengal.org

The Bharatiya Janata Party – West Bengal (BJP - West Bengal) is the state unit of Bharatiya Janata Party in the Indian state of West Bengal. The party headquarter is in Kolkata and is currently led by state president Samik Bhattacharya.

The party holds 6 seats in the Rajya Sabha and 12 seats in the Lok Sabha from the state. Furthermore, the party has 209 seats in the West Bengal Legislative Assembly by having a landslide victory in the 2026 West Bengal Legislative Assembly election and is the current ruling party in the state.

== History ==
=== Predecessors and formation ===
The origins of the BJP lies in the Bharatiya Jana Sangh (BJS) and the Rashtriya Swayamsevak Sangh (RSS). Syama Prasad Mukherjee, the founder of the BJS, was born in Calcutta (Now Kolkata), while K. B. Hedgewar, the founder of the RSS also studied in the city. In the 1960s, plenty of RSS offices opened across the state. They mostly worked with Marwari traders as well as migrants from eastern Uttar Pradesh and Bihar, in Kolkata's Burrabazar. By late 1960s, local meetings were conducted in Bengali as well.

=== Electoral performance ===
Vote share in consecutive assembly elections
2026	45.92%
2021	38.14%
2016	10.16%
2011	6.52%
2006	1.93%
2001	5.19%
1996	6.45%
1991	11.34%
1987	0.51%
1982	0.58%

Vote share in consecutive Lok Sabha elections
2024	38.73%
2019	40.25%
2014	17.02%
2009	6.14%
2004	8.06%
1999	11.13%
1998	10.2%
1996	6.88%
1991	11.66%
1989	1.67%
1984	0.4%

=== 1980s ===
The BJP started its operation within the state from the grassroots level of governance, particularly the panchayat politics. The party also used various cultural icons in the state, including Bankim Chandra Chatterjee and Swami Vivekananda in its election campaigns.

The Bharatiya Janata Party contested the West Bengal assembly election for the first time in 1982. The primary objective of the party was to create a nucleus for a future third force in West Bengal politics. The party supported the call of the West Bengal government to hold the elections in March 1982. The party contested on 52 assembly constituencies and got around 129,994 votes in the state.

In 1984 Lok Sabha election, BJP contested on 9 seats and got 101165 (0.4%) votes in West Bengal.

In the 1987 the party contested on 57 constituencies and slightly increased its votes to 134,867.

In 1989 Lok Sabha election, BJP contested on 19 seats and got 529618 (1.67%) votes in West Bengal.

=== 1990s ===
The Bharatiya Janata Party fielded 291 candidates across the state in 1991 Vidhan Sabha election, and managed to increase its share of votes from 0.51% in 1987 to 11.34% (3,513,121 votes). This was the first time BJP fielded such a large number of candidates in West Bengal assembly elections. The party also fielded 42 candidates for the 1991 Lok Sabha election which took place simultaneously with the Vidhan Sabha election. The BJP got 3624974 (11.66%) votes in this election. Rather than focusing primarily on the Ayodhya issue, which was highlighted in the BJP campaigns across the country, the West Bengal BJP campaign concentrated on agitations against immigration from Bangladesh. The campaign sought to invoke Bengali memories of Partition. While support for BJP increased among Bengali communities due to crime & violence by CPIM workers such as 1990 Bantala rape case, Besides this, the party was able to mobilise the rural voters who were not benefitted from Left government's land reforms.

In 1996, both Assembly election and Lok Sabha election took place simultaneously, the party contested on 292 assembly constituencies and got 2,372,480 (6.45%) votes and contested 42 Lok Sabha seats and got 2525864 (6.88%) votes across the state.

In 1998, the BJP contested on 14 seats and won 1 Lok Sabha seat for the first time in West Bengal from Dum Dum. It got 3724662 (10.2%) votes. Tapan Sikdar, who was serving as the West Bengal State President of BJP, won the Dum Dum constituency with 631,383 (50.7%) votes defeating nearest rival Nirmal Kanti Chatterjee of the CPI (M).

In 1999, the BJP in an alliance with All India Trinamool Congress contested 13 seats and won 2 Lok Sabha seats and got 3,928,424 votes (11.13). The two elected Member of Parliament, Lok Sabha were Satyabrata Mookherjee from Krishnanagar with 43.82% votes and Tapan Sikdar from Dum Dum with 51.59% votes.

=== 2000s ===
In 2001 Assembly election, BJP contested on 266 constituencies and got 1901351 (5.19%) votes throughout the state and 5.68% in seats contested.

In the 2004 Indian general election, the National Democratic Alliance was completely decimated by CPI (M) led Left Front and INC led United Progressive Alliance. The BJP didn't win a single seat and its ally All India Trinamool Congress was reduced to just 1 Lok Sabha seat. The BJP however managed to get 2983950 (8.06%) votes.

In the 2006 Assembly election, BJP entered into an alliance with the All India Trinamool Congress and contested on 29 constituencies. The BJP got 760236 (1.93%) votes throughout West Bengal and 19.89% on seats it contested.

In 2009 Indian general election, BJP candidate Jaswant Singh, with support from Gorkha Janmukti Morcha, won the Darjeeling Lok Sabha seat getting a total of 4,97,649 (51.50%) votes. Across the state BJP got only 6.14% votes.

=== 2010s ===
In 2011 Legislative Assembly election the BJP allied with GJM.

In 2014 Indian general election the BJP won only 2 seats. BJP candidates for the first time, returned runner-up in 3 seats and got 17.2% vote share throughout the state. This performance was better than BJP's previous best of 11.66% in 1991 elections. However the All India Trinamool Congress dominated the election winning 34 seats.

In 2016 Assembly election the BJP in an alliance with GJM contested 291 seats and got 5,555,134 (10.16%) votes and created history by winning 3 assembly seats for the first time.

There was a major political shift from the left to the right in the 2019 Lok Sabha election in West Bengal. The Bharatiya Janata Party, won 18 Lok Sabha seats out of the 42 constituencies with 23,028,343 (40.25%) votes. On 24 May 2019, The Statesman reported that BJP had made CPI-M a marginalised party and setting a strong challenge to the ruling Trinamool Congress. The shift in the voting pattern was seen across the state.

After the election the Government of India passed the Citizenship (Amendment) Act, 2019 (CAA) in the Parliament, allowing a quicker route to citizenship to non Muslim immigrants from neighbouring countries. The party hoped to benefit from the votes of the Hindu immigrants from Bangladesh.

=== Post 2020 ===
The BJP's Bengali booklet released in January 2020 claimed that the National Register of Citizens will be implemented to identify any undocumented migrants including Hindus, Sikhs, Muslims and non-Muslims by the Citizenship Amendment Act.

In 2021 Assembly election the BJP in an alliance with AJSU contested 293 seats and got 28,968,281(38.15%) votes and created history by winning 77 assembly seats for the first time and becoming the second largest party and the official opposition. Ahead of the election, numerous politicians from other parties, including the governing Trinamool Congress, joined the BJP. Notably, Suvendu Adhikari and Mihir Goswami, both of whom switched parties before the elections, were appointed as leader of opposition and deputy leader of opposition in the legislative assembly respectively.

In 2026 election, 7 Judicial Officers held hostage in bengal for 9 hours due to which Supreme court was forced to deploy central forces as there was complete breakdown of law and order.

The BJP has started campaigning for the 2026 West Bengal Legislative Assembly election with the slogan, "Paltano Darkar Chai BJP Sarkar". They are targeting Hindu voters and potentially Trinamool Congress's women vote bank with the appointment of Ratna Debnath in Panihati constituency.Finally they won the 2026 legislative election with a landslide victory, winning 208 out of 294 seats.

== Electoral performance ==
=== Lok Sabha ===
Year	Seats Won	Seats +/-	Vote Share (%)	+/- (%)	Outcome
Bharatiya Jana Sangh
1951–52	2 / 31	New	5.94%	New	Others
1957	0 / 36	▼2	1.43%	▼4.51%	Others
1962	0 / 36	Steady	1.05%	▼0.38%	Others
1967	0 / 40	Steady	1.39%	▲0.34%	Others
1971	0 / 40	Steady	0.85%	▼0.54%	Others
Janata Party (Note: Janata Party was the amalgamation of Bharatiya Lok Dal & Bharatiya Jana Sangh, formed in 1977.)
1977	15 / 42	New	21.46%	New	Government
1980	0 / 42	▼15	4.53%	▼16.93%	Opposition
Bharatiya Janata Party
1984	0 / 42	New	0.4%	New	Others
1989	0 / 42	Steady	1.67%	▲1.37%	Opposition
1991	0 / 42	Steady	11.66%	▲9.99%	Opposition
1996	0 / 42	Steady	6.88%	▼4.78%	Opposition
1998	1 / 42	▲1	10.2%	▲3.32%	Government
1999	2 / 42	▲1	11.13%	▲0.93%	Government
2004	0 / 42	▼2	8.06%	▼3.07%	Opposition
2009	1 / 42	▲1	6.14%	▼1.92%	Opposition
2014	2 / 42	▲1	16.84%	▲10.7%	Government
2019	18 / 42	▲16	40.64%	▲23.8%	Government
2024	12 / 42	▼6	39.1%	▼1.54%	Government

=== Legislative Assembly ===
Year	Assembly	Seats contested	Seats won	(+/-) in seats	% of votes	Vote swing	Popular vote	Outcome
1982	9th	52	0 / 294	New entry	0.58%	New entry	1,29,994	Others
1987	10th	57	0 / 294	Steady	0.51%	▼0.07	1,34,867	Others
1991	11th	291	0 / 294	Steady	11.34%	▲10.83	35,13,121	Others
1996	12th	292	0 / 294	Steady	6.45%	▼4.89	23,72,480	Others
2001	13th	266	0 / 294	Steady	5.19%	▼1.26	19,01,351	Others
2006	14th	29	0 / 294	Steady	1.93%	▼3.26	7,60,236	Others
2011	15th	289	0 / 294	Steady	4.06%	▲2.13	19,34,650	Others
2016	16th	291	3 / 294	▲3	10.16%	▲6.10	55,55,134	Opposition
2021	17th	293	77 / 294	▲74	37.97%	▲27.81	2,29,05,474	Opposition
2026	18th	294	208 / 294	▲131	45.92%	▲7.95	2,93,74,470	Government

=== Local elections ===
==== Municipal Corporation ====
Year	Municipal Corporation	Seats Won	Change in Seats	Status
Darjeeling district
2015	Siliguri Municipal Corporation	2 / 47	▲2	Opposition
2022	Siliguri Municipal Corporation	5 / 47	▲3	Opposition
Hooghly district
2015	Chandannagar Municipal Corporation	1 / 33		Opposition
2022	Chandannagar Municipal Corporation	0 / 33	▼1	Others
Howrah district
2013	Howrah Municipal Corporation	2 / 50		Opposition
Kolkata district
2015	Kolkata Municipal Corporation	7 / 144		Opposition
2021	Kolkata Municipal Corporation	3 / 144	▼4	Opposition
North 24 Parganas district
2015	Bidhannagar Municipal Corporation	0 / 41		Others
2022	Bidhannagar Municipal Corporation	0 / 41		Others
Paschim Bardhaman district
2015	Asansol Municipal Corporation	8 / 106		Opposition
2022	Asansol Municipal Corporation	7 / 106	▼1	Opposition
2017	Durgapur Municipal Corporation	0 / 43		Others

== Leadership and organisational structure ==
The following is the current organisational structure of the Bharatiya Janata Party – West Bengal as of May 2026:

=== Chief minister ===
#	Portrait	Name	Constituency	Term of office			Assembly
1		Suvendu Adhikari	Bhabanipur	9 May 2026	Incumbent	189 days	18th

=== Leaders of the Opposition in the Legislative Assembly ===
#	Portrait	Name	Constituency	Term of office			Assembly	Chief Minister
1		Suvendu Adhikari	Nandigram	13 May 2021	6 May 2026	4 years, 358 days	17th	Mamata Banerjee

=== Legislative party leader ===
No.	Portrait	Name	Constituency	Term of Office			Assembly	Election
1		Badal Bhattacharya	Ashoknagar	1999	2001	2 years		1999 (by- elected)
2		Samik Bhattacharya	Basirhat Dakshin	2014	2016	2 years	15th	2014 (by- elected)
3		Dilip Ghosh	Kharagpur Sadar	2016	2019 (Note: Resigned)	3 years	16th	2016
4		Manoj Tigga	Madarihat (ST)	2019	2021	2 years	16th	2016
5		Suvendu Adhikari	Nandigram	13 May 2021	Incumbent	5 years, 185 days	17th	2021
5		Suvendu Adhikari	Bhabanipur	13 May 2021	Incumbent	5 years, 185 days	18th	2026

=== State Office Bearers (2026) ===
Office	Officeholder(s)
State President	Samik Bhattacharya
General Secretary (Organisation)	Amitava Chakravorty
Joint General Secretary (Organisation)	Satish Dhond
General Secretaries	Jyotirmay Singh Mahato; Locket Chatterjee; Saumitra Khan; Bijan Goswami; Shashi Agnihotri
Vice-Presidents	Raju Anindya Banerjee; Debasree Chaudhuri; Prabal Raha; Sanjay Kumar Singh; Raju Bista; Amitava Roy; Tanuja Chakraborty; Phalguni Patra; Rampada Das; Vidyasagar Chakraborty; Manoj Pandey; Ananta Dev Adhikari
State Secretaries	Deepanjan Kumar Guha; Mahadev Sarkar; Sakharav Sarkar; Sintu Senapati; Mohon Sharma; Biva Majumdar; Sanjay Varma; Sonali Murmu; Ajit Das; Anal Biswas; Nilanjan Adhikari; Sankar Chakraborty
State Spokesperson	Ritwick Paul
Treasurer	Kedarashish Bapat
Social Media Convener	Saptarshi Choudhury
Media Convener	Bimal Shankar Nanda

=== Morcha Presidents (2026) ===
Morcha	President
Yuva Morcha	Amit Samanta
Mahila Morcha	Anjana Basu
SC Morcha	Biswajit Biswas
ST Morcha	Khagen Murmu
OBC Morcha	Dhananjay Ghosh
Kisan Morcha	Rajib Bhowmick
Minority Morcha	Ali Hussain

=== List of State Presidents ===
No.	Name	Term in office
1	Haripada Bharati	1980–1982
2	Vishnu Kant Shastri	1982–1986
3	Sukumar Banerjee	1986–1991
4	Tapan Sikdar	1991–1995
(2)	Vishnu Kant Shastri	1995–1997
(4)	Tapan Sikdar	1997–1999
5	Ashim Kumar Ghosh	1999–2002
6	Tathagata Roy	2002–2006
(3)	Sukumar Banerjee	2006–2008
7	Satyabrata Mookherjee	2008–2009
8	Rahul Sinha	2009–2015
9	Dilip Ghosh	2015–2021
10	Sukanta Majumdar	2021–2025
11	Samik Bhattacharya	2025–Incumbent

The West Bengal BJP has one president, twelve vice-presidents and five general secretaries & twelve secretaries. As of July 2025, the President of the West Bengal state branch of the party is Samik Bhattacharya.

For the first time under leadership of Rahul Sinha the party got 2 loksabha seats from the state in 2014 Indian General Elections without any alliance. And got 17.02% votes from the state in loksabha election.

Under the leadership of Dilip Ghosh as state president the party achieve one of the major win in the state and recognised as opposition party status in state for first time after the party formed. During his leadership party gain 18 MP in 2019 lok sabha election. And in 2021 Vidhan sabha election party gain 77 MLA.

Under the leadership of Sukanta Majumdar the party secures 39.08% votes and 12 Lok Sabha seats from the state in 2024 lok sabha election. In 2023 West Bengal local election party stood second position securing 23% votes and 2022 West Bengal local Elections party secures 13% votes.

In 2026 West Bengal Legislative Assembly Election for first time after formation the party come in Government with 208 seats i.e. 70% of seats and 45.92% of vote share in the state under the leadership of the state president Shri Samik Bhattacharya.

=== List of president of the Mahila Morcha ===
Name	Term in office
Jyotsna Banerjee	2010 - 2015
Roopa Ganguly	2015 – 24 July 2017
Locket Chatterjee	24 July 2017 – 1 June 2020
Agnimitra Paul	1 June 2020 – 22 December 2021
Tanuja Chakraborty	22 December 2021 – 3 May 2023
Falguni Patra	3 May 2023 – 25 September 2026
Anjana Basu	25 September 2026 – present

== Current elected members ==
=== Incumbent member(s) of Rajya Sabha ===
S.No.	Name	Term Start	Term End	Remarks				
S.No.	Name	Term Start	Term End	Remarks	01.	Rahul Sinha	03-Apr-2026	02-Apr-2032
02.	Samik Bhattacharya	03-Apr-2024	02-Apr-2030	WB State President				
03.	Ananta Maharaj	19-Aug-2023	18-Aug-2029					
04.	Sushmita Dev	17-Jul-2026	02-Apr-2030					
05.	Prakash Chik Baraik	17-Jul-2026	18-Aug-2029					
06.	Sukhendu Sekhar Roy	17-Jul-2026	18-Aug-2029					
07.	Koel Mallick	10-Oct-2026	02-Apr-2032					

=== Incumbent member(s) of Lok Sabha ===
S.No.	Constituency		Name	Win Margin in 2024
S.No.	#	Name	Name	Win Margin in 2024
01.	2	Alipurduars	Manoj Tigga	75,447
02.	3	Jalpaiguri	Jayanta Kumar Roy	86,693
03.	4	Darjeeling	Raju Bista	1,78,525
04.	5	Raiganj	Kartick Chandra Paul	68,197
05.	6	Balurghat	Sukanta Majumdar	10,386
06.	7	Maldaha Uttar	Khagen Murmu	77,708
07.	13	Ranaghat	Jagannath Sarkar	1,86,899
08.	14	Bongaon	Shantanu Thakur	73,693
09.	30	Tamluk	Abhijit Gangopadhyay	77,733
10.	31	Kanthi	Soumendu Adhikari	47,764
11.	35	Purulia	Jyotirmay Singh Mahato	17,079
12.	37	Bishnupur	Saumitra Khan	5,567

=== Incumbent member(s) of Legislative Assembly ===
S.No.	Constituency		Name	Remarks	Win Margin in 2026
S.No.	#	Name	Name	Remarks	Win Margin in 2026
Cooch Behar district
01.	1	Mekliganj (SC)	Dadhiram Ray		29,584
02.	2	Mathabhanga (SC)	Nisith Pramanik	Cabinet minister	57,090
03.	3	Cooch Behar Uttar (SC)	Sukumar Roy		70,384
04.	4	Cooch Behar Dakshin	Rathindra Bose	Speaker	22,747
05.	5	Sitalkuchi (SC)	Sabitri Barman		25,278
06.	7	Dinhata	Ajay Ray		17,447
07.	8	Natabari	Girija Shankar Ray		34,613
08.	9	Tufanganj	Malati Rava Roy	Minister of State (Independent Charge)	26,457
Alipurduar district
09.	10	Kumargram (ST)	Manoj Kumar Oraon	Cabinet Minister	52,877
10.	11	Kalchini (ST)	Bishal Lama	Minister of State	37,843
11.	12	Alipurduars	Paritosh Das		70,420
12.	13	Falakata (SC)	Dipak Barman	Cabinet Minister	45,999
13.	14	Madarihat (ST)	Laxuman Limbu		40,910
Jalpaiguri district
14.	15	Dhupguri (SC)	Naresh Roy		38,550
15.	16	Maynaguri (SC)	Dalim Chandra Roy		56,503
16.	17	Jalpaiguri (SC)	Ananta Deb Adhikari		68,805
17.	18	Rajganj (SC)	Dinesh Sarkar		21,477
18.	19	Dabgram-Phulbari	Shikha Chatterjee		97,715
19.	20	Mal (ST)	Sukra Munda		15,492
20.	21	Nagrakata (ST)	Puna Bhengra		25,858
Kalimpong district
21.	22	Kalimpong	Bharat Kumar Chhetri		21,464
Darjeeling district
22.	23	Darjeeling	Noman Rai		6,057
23.	24	Kurseong	Sonam Lama		17,007
24.	25	Matigara-Naxalbari (SC)	Anandamoy Barman	Minister of State	1,04,265
25.	26	Siliguri	Shankar Ghosh	Cabinet Minister	73,192
26.	27	Phansidewa (ST)	Durga Murmu		45,263
Uttar Dinajpur district
27.	32	Karandighi	Biraj Biswas	Minister of State	19,869
28.	33	Hemtabad (SC)	Haripada Barman		12,361
29.	34	Kaliaganj (SC)	Utpal Brahmachari		76,425
30.	35	Raiganj	Koushik Chowdhury		58,641
Dakshin Dinajpur district
31.	37	Kushmandi (SC)	Tapas Chandra Roy		9,063
32.	39	Balurghat	Bidyut Kumar Roy		47,576
33.	40	Tapan (ST)	Budhrai Tudu		36,987
34.	41	Gangarampur (SC)	Satyendra Nath Ray		28,339
Malda district
35.	43	Habibpur (ST)	Joyel Murmu	Minister of State	78,188
36.	44	Gazole (SC)	Chinmoy Deb Barman		38,192
37.	49	Manikchak	Gour Chandra Mandal		13,938
38.	50	Maldaha (SC)	Gopal Chandra Saha		50,128
39.	51	English Bazar	Amlan Bhaduri		93,784
40.	54	Baisnabnagar	Raju Karmakar		46,881
Murshidabad district
41.	58	Jangipur	Chitta Mukherjee		10,542
42.	64	Murshidabad	Gouri Shankar Ghosh	Cabinet Minister	31,521
43.	65	Nabagram (SC)	Dilip Saha		5,919
44.	66	Khargram (SC)	Mitali Mal		9,333
45.	67	Burwan (SC)	Sukhen Kumar Bagdi		22,300
46.	68	Kandi	Gargi Das Ghosh	Minister of State	10,335
47.	70	Rejinagar	Sakharav Sarkar		75,816
48.	71	Beldanga	Bharat Kumar Jhawar		13,208
49.	72	Baharampur	Subrata Maitra		17,548
Nadia district
50.	77	Karimpur	Samarendranath Ghosh		10,185
51.	78	Tehatta	Subrata Kabiraj		28,253
52.	81	Nakashipara	Shantanu Dey		17,327
53.	83	Krishnanagar Uttar	Tarak Nath Chatterjee		78,361
54.	84	Nabadwip	Shruti Shekhar Goswami		21,444
55.	85	Krishnanagar Dakshin	Sadhan Ghosh		27,801
56.	86	Shantipur	Swapan Kumar Das		45,376
57.	87	Ranaghat Uttar Paschim	Parthasarathi Chatterjee		57,551
58.	88	Krishnaganj (SC)	Sukanta Biswas		60,899
59.	89	Ranaghat Uttar Purba (SC)	Ashim Biswas		51,743
60.	90	Ranaghat Dakshin (SC)	Ashim Kumar Biswas		64,464
61.	91	Chakdaha	Bankim Chandra Ghosh		36,945
62.	92	Kalyani (SC)	Anupam Biswas		34,792
63.	93	Haringhata (SC)	Ashim Kumar Sarkar		22,055
North 24 Parganas district
64.	94	Bagdah (SC)	Soma Thakur		34,616
65.	95	Bangaon Uttar (SC)	Ashok Kirtania	Cabinet Minister	40,670
66.	96	Bangaon Dakshin (SC)	Swapan Majumder		37,814
67.	97	Gaighata (SC)	Subrata Thakur		47,683
68.	100	Habra	Debdas Mondal		31,462
69.	101	Ashoknagar	Sumay Hira		9,408
70.	103	Bijpur	Sudipta Das		13,343
71.	104	Naihati	Sumitro Chatterjee		10,430
72.	105	Bhatpara	Pawan Kumar Singh		22,807
73.	106	Jagaddal	Rajesh Kumar		20,909
74.	107	Noapara	Arjun Singh	Cabinet Minister	17,656
75.	108	Barrackpore	Kaustuv Bagchi		15,822
76.	109	Khardaha	Kalyan Chakraborty	Cabinet Minister	24,486
77.	110	Dum Dum Uttar	Sourav Sikdar		26,404
78.	111	Panihati	Ratna Debnath		28,836
79.	113	Baranagar	Sajal Ghosh		16,956
80.	114	Dum Dum	Arijit Bakshi		25,273
81.	115	Rajarhat New Town	Piyush Kanodia		316
82.	116	Bidhannagar	Sharadwat Mukherjee	Cabinet Minister	37,330
83.	117	Rajarhat Gopalpur	Tarunjyoti Tewari		27,757
84.	119	Barasat	Shankar Chatterjee		34,558
85.	123	Sandeshkhali (ST)	Sanat Sardar		17,510
86.	126	Hingalganj (SC)	Rekha Patra		5,421
South 24 Parganas district
87.	127	Gosaba (SC)	Bikarna Naskar		16,100
88.	131	Kakdwip	Dipankar Jana	Minister of State	4,760
89.	132	Sagar	Sumanta Mandal		7,881
90.	144	Falta	Debangshu Panda		1,09,021
91.	145	Satgachhia	Agniswar Naskar		401
92.	147	Sonarpur Dakshin	Roopa Ganguly		35,782
93.	150	Jadavpur	Sarbari Mukherjee		27,716
94.	151	Sonarpur Uttar	Debasish Dhar		9,807
95.	152	Tollygunge	Papiya Adhikari		6,013
96.	153	Behala Purba	Shankar Sikder		25,137
97.	154	Behala Paschim	Indranil Khan	Minister of State (Independent charge)	24,699
Kolkata district
98.	159	Bhabanipur	Suvendu Adhikari	Chief Minister	15,105
99.	160	Rashbehari	Swapan Dasgupta	Cabinet Minister	20,865
100.	165	Jorasanko	Vijay Ojha		5,797
101.	166	Shyampukur	Purnima Chakraborty	Minister of State	14,633
102.	167	Maniktala	Tapas Roy	Cabinet Minister	15,644
103.	168	Kashipur-Belgachhia	Ritesh Tiwari		1,651
Howrah district
104.	169	Bally	Sanjay Kumar Singh		11,997
105.	170	Howrah Uttar	Umesh Rai	Minister of State	11,250
106.	172	Shibpur	Rudranil Ghosh		16,058
107.	177	Uluberia Uttar (SC)	Chiran Bera		4,177
108.	179	Shyampur	Hiran Chatterjee		22,260
109.	181	Amta	Amit Samanta		4,454
110.	183	Jagatballavpur	Anupam Ghosh		6,671
Hooghly district
111.	185	Uttarpara	Dipanjan Chakraborty		10,415
112.	186	Sreerampur	Bhaskar Bhattacharya	Minister of State	8,685
113.	187	Champdani	Dilip Singh		3,026
114.	188	Singur	Arup Kumar Das		21,438
115.	189	Chandannagar	Dipanjan Kumar Guha		13,441
116.	190	Chunchura	Subir Nag		43,435
117.	191	Balagarh (SC)	Sumana Sarkar	Minister of State	41,914
118.	192	Pandua	Tushar Kumar Majumder		5,228
119.	193	Saptagram	Swaraj Ghosh		23,289
120.	195	Jangipara	Prosenjit Bag		862
121.	196	Haripal	Madhumita Ghosh		3,488
122.	198	Tarakeswar	Santu Pan		30,999
123.	199	Pursurah	Biman Ghosh		53,453
124.	200	Arambagh (SC)	Hemanta Bag		28,959
125.	201	Goghat (SC)	Prasanta Digar	Arambagh district org. President	49,582
126.	202	Khanakul	Susanta Ghosh		34,483
Purba Medinipur district
127.	203	Tamluk	Hari Krishna Bera	Minister of State	34,729
128.	204	Panskura Purba	Subrata Maity		17,903
129.	205	Panskura Paschim	Sintu Senapati		32,567
130.	206	Moyna	Ashok Dinda	Minister of State	16,241
131.	207	Nandakumar	Nirmal Khanra		30,603
132.	208	Mahisadal	Subhash Chandra Panja		26,238
133.	209	Haldia (SC)	Pradip Kumar Bijali		49,062
134.	210	Nandigram	Hasi Rani Rath		1,22,753
135.	211	Chandipur	Pijush Kanti Das		20,270
136.	212	Patashpur	Tapan Maity		9,051
137.	213	Kanthi Uttar	Sumita Sinha		20,055
138.	214	Bhagabanpur	Shantanu Pramanik	Minister of State	20,878
139.	215	Khejuri (SC)	Subrata Paik		32,690
140.	216	Kanthi Dakshin	Arup Kumar Das	Cabinet Minister	31,472
141.	217	Ramnagar	Chandra Shekhar Mondal		26,939
142.	218	Egra	Dibyendu Adhikari		25,692
Jhargram district
143.	220	Nayagram (ST)	Amiya Kisku	Minister of State	6,424
144.	221	Gopiballavpur	Rajesh Mahata	Minister of State (Independent charge)	26,675
145.	222	Jhargram	Lakshmikanta Sau		38,147
146.	237	Binpur (ST)	Pranat Tudu		22,977
Paschim Medinipur district
147.	219	Dantan	Ajit Kumar Jana		10,376
148.	223	Keshiary (ST)	Bhadra Hembram		15,887
149.	224	Kharagpur Sadar	Dilip Ghosh	Cabinet Minister	30,506
150.	225	Narayangarh	Rama Prasad Giri		20,367
151.	226	Sabang	Amal Kumar Panda		11,136
152.	227	Pingla	Swagata Manna		18,480
153.	229	Debra	Subhasish Om		28,801
154.	230	Daspur	Tapan Kumar Dutta		32,134
155.	231	Ghatal (SC)	Shital Kapat		37,657
156.	232	Chandrakona (SC)	Sukanta Dolui		33,481
157.	233	Garbeta	Pradip Lodha		26,225
158.	234	Salboni	Biman Mahata		15,243
159.	236	Medinipur	Shankar Guchhait		38,747
Purulia district
160.	238	Bandwan (ST)	Labsen Baskey		29,577
161.	239	Balarampur	Jaladhar Mahato		35,051
162.	240	Baghmundi	Rahidas Mahato		40,817
163.	241	Joypur	Biswajit Mahato		22,218
164.	242	Purulia	Sudip Kumar Mukherjee		49,253
165.	243	Manbazar (ST)	Mayna Murmu		27,283
166.	244	Kashipur	Kamalakanta Hansda		21,276
167.	245	Para (SC)	Nadiar Chand Bouri	Minister of State	33,721
168.	246	Raghunathpur (SC)	Mamoni Bauri		44,059
Bankura district
169.	247	Saltora (SC)	Chandana Bauri		32,135
170.	248	Chhatna	Satyanarayan Mukhopadhyay		47,174
171.	249	Ranibandh (ST)	Kshudiram Tudu	Cabinet Minister	52,269
172.	250	Raipur (ST)	Kshetra Mohan Hansda		28,742
173.	251	Taldangra	Souvik Patra		50,073
174.	252	Bankura	Niladri Sekhar Dana		54,177
175.	253	Barjora	Billeswar Sinha		41,310
176.	254	Onda	Amarnath Shakha		31,723
177.	255	Bishnupur	Shukla Chatterjee		30,605
178.	256	Katulpur (SC)	Lakshmikanta Majumdar		34,367
179.	257	Indas (SC)	Nirmal Kumar Dhara		900
180.	258	Sonamukhi (SC)	Dibakar Gharami	Minister of State	29,410
Purba Bardhaman district
181.	260	Bardhaman Dakshin	Moumita Biswas Mishra	Minister of State	30,470
182.	261	Raina (SC)	Subhash Patra		834
183.	262	Jamalpur (SC)	Arun Halder		11,178
184.	263	Monteswar	Saikat Panja		14,798
185.	264	Kalna (SC)	Siddharth Majumdar		28,630
186.	265	Memari	Manab Guha		7,106
187.	267	Bhatar	Soumen Karfa		6,528
188.	268	Purbasthali Dakshin	Prankrishna Tapadar		16,662
189.	269	Purbasthali Uttar	Gopal Chattopadhyay		30,226
190.	270	Katwa	Krishna Ghosh		35,066
191.	271	Ketugram	Anadi Ghosh		27,610
192.	272	Mangalkot	Shishir Ghosh		12,723
193.	273	Ausgram (SC)	Kalita Maji	Minister of State	12,535
194.	274	Galsi (SC)	Raju Patra		10,494
Paschim Bardhaman district
195.	275	Pandabeswar	Jitendra Tiwari		1,398
196.	276	Durgapur Purba	Chandra Shekhar Banerjee		30,934
197.	277	Durgapur Paschim	Lakshman Chandra Ghorui		37,598
198.	278	Raniganj	Partho Ghosh		17,786
199.	279	Jamuria	Bijan Mukherjee		22,514
200.	280	Asansol Dakshin	Agnimitra Paul	Cabinet Minister	40,839
201.	281	Asansol Uttar	Krishnendu Mukherjee		11,615
202.	282	Kulti	Ajay Kumar Poddar	Cabinet Minister	26,498
203.	283	Barabani	Arijit Roy		11,722
Birbhum district
204.	284	Dubrajpur (SC)	Anup Kumar Saha		27,647
205.	285	Suri	Jagannath Chattopadhyay	Cabinet Minister	28,686
206.	288	Labhpur	Debasish Ojha		3,550
207.	289	Sainthia (SC)	Krishna Kanta Saha		10,306
208.	290	Mayureswar	Dudh Kumar Mondal	Cabinet Minister	21,002
209.	284	Rampurhat	Dhruba Saha		24,233

== Banga Kamal Barta ==
Bharatiya Janata Party – West Bengal
- Banga Kamal Barta Cover, May 2026
- Editor: Jagannath Chattopadhyay
- Frequency: Monthly
- Founded: 2016
- Company: Bharatiya Janata Party - West Bengal
- Country: India
- Based in: Kolkata
- Language: Bangla
- Website: kamalbarta.in

Banga Kamal Barta is the official mouthpiece of the Bharatiya Janata Party's West Bengal unit. The mouthpiece was launched in 2016 by the party, after winning 2 seats in the legislative assembly election. Currently, Jagannath Chattopadhyay is the editor of the mouthpiece.

== See also ==
- Bharatiya Janata Party – Kerala
- Bharatiya Janata Party, Gujarat
- Bharatiya Janata Party, Uttar Pradesh
- Bharatiya Janata Party, Madhya Pradesh
- Bharatiya Janata Party, Bihar
- Bharatiya Janata Party, Chhattisgarh
- Bharatiya Janata Party, Odisha
- State units of the Bharatiya Janata Party
- Communist Party of India (Marxist), West Bengal
- West Bengal Pradesh Congress Committee
