= 2015 Siliguri Municipal Corporation election =

Local election in India

- 25 April 2015

All 47 seats in Siliguri Municipal Corporation 24 seats needed for a majority

	First party	Second party	Third party
Leader	Ashok Bhattacharya	Goutam Deb	Gangotri Dutta
Party	CPI(M)	AITC	INC
Last election	16	14	16
Seats won	23	17	4
Seat change	▲7	▲3	▼12
	Fourth party
Party	BJP
Last election	0
Seats won	2
Seat change	▲2
Mayor before election
Gangotri Dutta
INC
Mayor after election
Ashok Bhattacharya
CPI(M)

The Siliguri Municipal Corporation election, 2015 is an election of members to the Siliguri Municipal Corporation which governs Siliguri. The 2015 SMC election was conducted on 25 April 2015 to elect members to all 47 wards of the municipal corporation.

== Result ==
The Left Front formed the board in the Siliguri Municipal Corporation. TMC jumping from 14 to 17 seats. Indian National Congress had fallen to 4 seats.

Party		Seats	Seat Change
	CPI(M)	23	+7
	AITC	17	+3
	INC	4	-12
	BJP	2	+2
	Others		
Total	47		

== Results By Ward ==
The results were announced in April 2015, The Left Front has won 23 wards while Trinamool Congress and INC have won 17 and 4 wards respectively.

Results
Type		Winner			Runner Up			Margin
#	Name	Candidate	Party	Votes	Candidate	Party	Votes	Margin
1	SCW	Arindom biswas	BJP	2730	LALPARI ROUTH (MAHATO)	AITC	2079	651
2	W	SNIGDHA HAZRA (HALDER)	CPI(M)	2777	GARGI CHATTERJEE	AITC	2397	380
