= 2022 Siliguri Municipal Corporation election =

Election to Siliguri Municipal Corporation, 2022

- 12 February 2022

All 47 seats in Siliguri Municipal Corporation 24 seats needed for a majority

	First party	Second party	Third party
Leader	Goutam Deb		Ashok Bhattacharya
Party	AITC	BJP	CPI(M)
Alliance	–		LF
Last election	17	2	23
Seats won	37	5	4
Seat change	▲20	▲3	▼19
Percentage	47.24%	23.24%	18.28%
	Fourth party	Fifth party
Party	INC	Independents
Alliance	UPA
Last election	4	1
Seats won	1	0
Seat change	▼3	▼1
Percentage	5.32%	5.91%
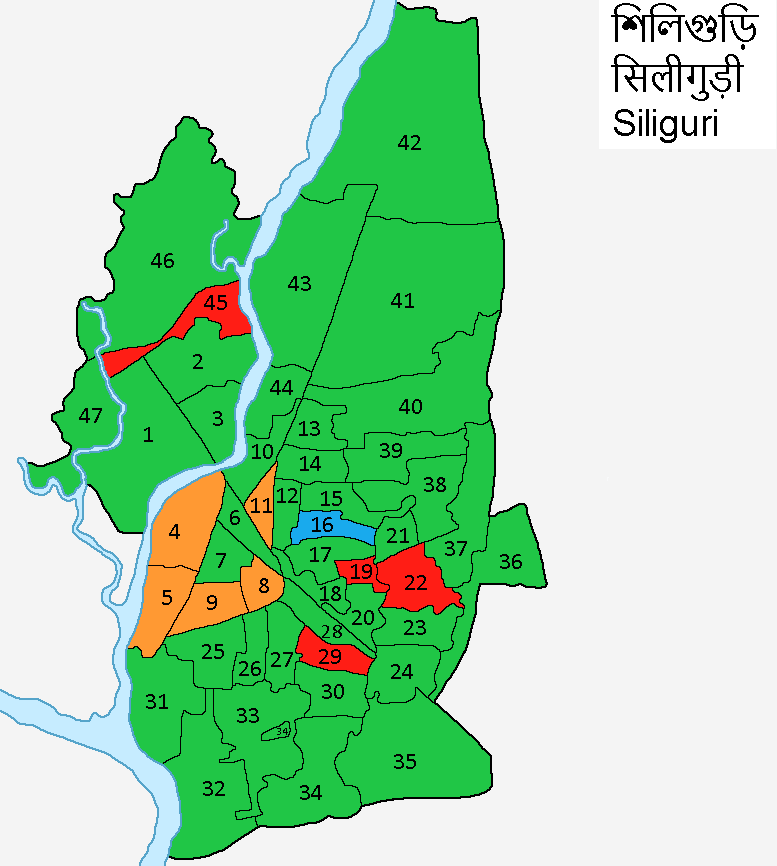
- Results by wards

- Structure after the election
Mayor before election
Ashok Bhattacharya
CPI(M)
Elected Mayor
Goutam Deb
AITC

Municipal elections were held in Siliguri on 12 February 2022 to elect members of the Siliguri Municipal Corporation.

The Trinamool Congress party won the election defeating CPI(M) led Left Front with an overwhelming majority. The sitting mayor of Siliguri Ashok Bhattacharya lost his ward to TMC candidate Alam Khan by 482 votes. After the result, Goutam Deb became the new Mayor. The Bharatiya Janata Party emerged as the second largest party.

== Schedule ==
Poll event	Schedule
Notification date	28 Dec, 2021
Last Date for filing nomination	3 Jan, 2022
Last Date for withdrawal of nomination	6 Jan, 2022
Date of poll	12 Feb, 2022
Date of counting of votes	14 Feb, 2022

== Parties and alliances ==
Following is a list of political parties and alliances which contested in this election:

Party	Symbol	Alliance	No. of contesting candidates
All India Forward Bloc (AIFB)		Left Front	3
Communist Party of India (CPI)		Left Front	2
Communist Party of India (Marxist) (CPI(M))		Left Front	36
Revolutionary Socialist Party (RSP)		Left Front	2
All India Trinamool Congress (AITC)		None	47
Bharatiya Janata Party (BJP)		None	46
Indian National Congress (INC)		None	34
Communist Party of India (Marxist–Leninist) Liberation CPI(ML)L		None	1
Independents (IND)		None	30

== Candidates ==
List of candidates
Ward		Reservation	Left Front		AITC		BJP		INC	
#	Name	SC/ST/Women	Party	Candidate	Party	Candidate	Party	Candidate	Party	Candidate
1	Ward No. 1	None	RSP	Biswajit Roy	AITC	Sanjay Pathak	BJP	Kanhaiya Kumar Pathak	INC	Maksudan Sahani
2	Ward No. 2	Women	CPI(M)	Snighda Hazra(Halder)	AITC	Gargi Chatterjee	BJP	Bani Paul	INC	Tanu Ghosh
3	Ward No. 3	None	RSP	Chhanda Goswami Sarkar	AITC	Ram Bhajan Mahato	BJP	Binod Kumar Gupta	INC	Roshan Kumar Jha
4	Ward No. 4	None	CPI(M)	Sourove Kanti Sarkar	AITC	Parimal Mitra	BJP	Vivekananda Singh	INC	Chabi Das
5	Ward No. 5	Women	AIFB	Rina Yadav	AITC	Saroj Goenka	BJP	Anita Mahato	INC	Shruti Yadav
6	Ward No. 6	None	CPI(M)	Ashok Narayan Bhattacharya	AITC	Alam Khan	BJP	Noor Jahan Ansari	INC	Md Shahanawaz Hussain
7	Ward No. 7	None	Left Front supports INC		AITC	Pintu Ghosh	BJP	Shakuntala Mishra	INC	Rajeev Kumar Mishra
8	Ward No. 8	Women	CPI(M)	Sabita Mitruka	AITC	Khusboo Mittal	BJP	Shalini Dalmia	INC supports CPI(M)	
9	Ward No. 9	None	AIFB	Mohan Lal Mandal	AITC	Pradip Kumar Goyel	BJP	Amit Jain	INC	Harendra Lohia
10	Ward No. 10	None	CPI(M)	Suraj Kundu	AITC	Kamal Agarwal	BJP	Prasenjit Paul	INC supports CPI(M)	
11	Ward No. 11	Women	Left Front supported Independent candidate Santosh Devi Singhal		AITC	Uma Goyal	BJP	Manjushree Paul	INC supports Left Front	
12	Ward No. 12	None	CPI(M)	Pradip Ghosh	AITC	Basudeb Ghosh	BJP	Nantu Paul	INC	Soubhik Sengupta
13	Ward No. 13	None	CPI	Raman Tuli	AITC	Manik Dey	BJP	Bhushan Jain	INC supports CPI	
14	Ward No. 14	Women	CPI(M)	Munmun Bhowmik	AITC	Srabani Dutta	BJP	Madhabi Mukherjee	INC	Shilpi Sarkar
15	Ward No. 15	None	CPI	Habul Ghosh	AITC	Ranjan Sarkar	BJP	Raju Saha	INC	Subin Bhowmick
16	Ward No. 16	None	Left Front supports INC		AITC	Sanjeeb Chakraborty	BJP	Shibendhu Dutta	INC	Sujoy Ghatak
17	Ward No. 17	Women	CPI(M)	Joyita Mitra	AITC	Mili Seal Sinha	BJP	Shipra Mondal	INC	Ruma Nath
18	Ward No. 18	None	CPI(M)	Deepak Kumar Sahani	AITC	Sanjay Sharma	BJP	Debkumar Sengupta	INC supports CPI(M)	
19	Ward No. 19	None	CPI(M)	Mousumi Hazra	AITC	Bimal Ghosh	BJP	Tridib Saha	INC supports CPI(M)	
20	Ward No. 20	Women	CPI(M)	Anjana Dey	AITC	Abhaya Bose	BJP	Pala Balo Majumder	INC	Shampa Bhattacharjee
21	Ward No. 21	None	Left Front supports INC		AITC	Kuntal Roy	BJP	Suman Sarkar	INC	Tapan Dutta
22	Ward No. 22	None	CPI(M)	Dipta Karmakar	AITC	Dhiman Bose	BJP	Shyama Shankar Rakshit	INC	Sujit Dutta
23	Ward No. 23	Women	CPI(M)	Ayantika Chakraborty	AITC	Lakshmi Paul	BJP	Sharmistha Dey Sarkar	INC	Ayantika Ghosh Guha
24	Ward No. 24	None	CPI(M)	Indrajit Chanda	AITC	Pratul Chakraborty	BJP	Sankar Ghosh	INC	Dipak Kar
25	Ward No. 25	None	AIFB	Dalia Ghosh	AITC	Jayanta Saha	BJP	Santosh Modak	INC	Shankar Choudhury
26	Ward No. 26	Women	CPI(M)	Binapani Dutta	AITC	Sikta Dey Basu Ray	BJP	Anindita Roy Das	INC	Ruchira Malakar
27	Ward No. 27	None	CPI(M)	Sudip Bhattacharjee	AITC	Prasanta Chakraborty	BJP	Ranvir Majumder	INC supports CPI(M)	
28	Ward No. 28	SC Women	CPI(M)	Aparna Dalai	AITC	Samprita Das	BJP	Jyoti Prasad Bhagat	INC supports CPI(M)	
29	Ward No. 29	None	CPI(M)	Saradindu Chakraborty	AITC	Susmita Bose Moitra	BJP	Prosenjit Saha	INC	Nandita Saha Bose
30	Ward No. 30	Women	CPI(M)	Manju Karmakar	AITC	Sathi Das	BJP	Rinku Dutta	INC supports CPI(M)	
31	Ward No. 31	SC Women	CPI(M)	Bani Barman	AITC	Moumita Mondal	BJP	Rinku Bagchi	INC	Navaneeta Tirkey
32	Ward No. 32	None	CPI(M)	Bidhayak Chandra Das	AITC	Tapas Chatterjee	BJP	Kajal Das	INC supports CPI(M)	
33	Ward No. 33	None	CPI(M)	Ashim Kumar Saha	AITC	Goutam Deb	BJP	Parimal Sutradhar	INC	Niranjan Acharjya
34	Ward No. 34	SC	CPI(M)	Golap Roy Das	AITC	Biman Chandra Tapadar	BJP	Ratan Das	INC	Swati Sarkar Bhattacharjee
35	Ward No. 35	Women	CPI(M)	Shefali Bhattacharjee	AITC	Sampa Nandi	BJP	Arpita Das	INC	Rita Chaudhury
36	Ward No.36	None	CPI(M)	Barun Talukdar	AITC	Ranjan Sil Sharma	BJP	Partha Baidya	INC supports CPI(M)	
37	Ward No. 37	SC	CPI(M)	Nakul Chandra Sarkar	AITC	Alok Bhakta	BJP	Amrit Poddar	INC supports CPI(M)	
38	Ward No. 38	None	CPI(M)	Tapas Das	AITC	Dulal Dutta	BJP	Nityananda Pal	INC supports CPI(M)	
39	Ward No. 39	Women	CPI(M)	Priya Dey	AITC	Pinki Saha	BJP	Arundhati Jha	INC	Pritilata Roy
40	Ward No. 40	None	CPI(M)	Biplab Dutta	AITC	Rajesh Prasad Sah	BJP	Dilip Roy	INC	Manoj Agarwal
41	Ward No. 41	None	CPI(M)	Naresh Singh	AITC	Shivika Mittal	BJP	Julee Tamang	INC	Kamal Majumdar
42	Ward No. 42	ST	CPI(M)	Sunita Gheesing	AITC	Shobha Subba	BJP	Kersensia Kindo	INC	Chingzong Helena Lepcha
43	Ward No. 43	SC	CPI(M)	Surendra Sharma	AITC	Sukhdeo Mahato	BJP	Sachin Prasad	INC	Santosh Roy
44	Ward No. 44	SC	CPI(M)	Mahua Bhattacharjee	AITC	Pritikana Biswas	BJP	Iti Acharjee	INC	Nabina Sarkar
45	Ward No. 45	Women	CPI(M)	Munshi Nurul Islam	AITC	Bedabrata Dutta	BJP	Dinesh Singh	INC	Bablu Mahato
46	Ward No. 46	None	CPI(M)	Paresh Chandra Sarkar	AITC	Dilip Barman	Didn't Field Candidate		INC	Shikha Roy
47	Ward No. 47	SC	CPI(M)	Mukul Sengupta	AITC	Amar Ananda Das	BJP	Nirmal Bagchi	INC	Sudhan Bhowmick

== Result ==
=== Party-wise result ===
37	5	4	1
AITC	BJP	CPI(M)	INC

Vote share by alliance
1. AITC (47.2%)
2. BJP (23.2%)
3. LF (18.3%)
4. INC (5.32%)
5. IND (5.91%)
6. Others (0.01%)

=== Ward-wise result ===
The Ward-wise Results were announced by the West Bengal State Election Commission after the counting.

Results
Ward number	Winner			Runner Up			Margin
Ward number	Party	Candidate	Votes	Party	Candidate	Votes	Margin
Ward No. 1	AITC	Sanjay Pathak	3,341	Independent	Birandra Kapoor	2,472	869
Ward No. 2	AITC	Gargi Chatterjee	3,613	CPI(M)	Snigdha Hazra(Halder)	2,557	1,056
Ward No. 3	AITC	Rambhajan Mahato	3,606	BJP	Binod Kumar Gupta	2,046	1,560
Ward No. 4	BJP	Vivek Singh	4,936	AITC	Parimal Mitra	4,867	69
Ward No. 5	BJP	Anita Mahato	2,551	Independent	Rakhi Gupta	2,315	236
Ward No. 6	AITC	Alam Khan	1,929	CPI(M)	Ashok Bhattacharya	1,447	482
Ward No. 7	AITC	Pintu Ghosh	3,206	BJP	Shakuntala Mishra	1,239	1,967
Ward No. 8	BJP	Shalini Dalmia	2,160	AITC	Khushboo Mittal	1,367	793
Ward No. 9	BJP	Amit Jain	2,168	AITC	Pradip Kumar Goyel	2,097	71
Ward No. 10	AITC	Kamal Agarwal	1363	BJP	Prasenjit Paul	1,042	321
Ward No. 11	BJP	Manjushree Paul	833	AITC	Uma Goyal	793	40
Ward No. 12	AITC	Basudeb Ghosh	1,056	BJP	Nantu Paul	791	265
Ward No. 13	AITC	Manik Dey	1,762	BJP	Bhushan Jain	892	870
Ward No. 14	AITC	Srabani Dutta	2,312	BJP	Madhabi Mukherjee	1,102	1,210
Ward No. 15	AITC	Ranjan Sarkar	2,612	BJP	Raju Saha	1,276	1,336
Ward No. 16	INC	Sujoy Ghattak	1,804	AITC	Sanjeeb Chakroborty	980	824
Ward No. 17	AITC	Mili Sil Sinha	1,850	CPI(M)	Joyita Mitra(Jaya)	531	1,319
Ward No. 18	AITC	Sanjay Sharma	1,862	BJP	Deb Kumar Sengupta	1,449	213
Ward No. 19	CPI(M)	Mousumi Hazra	1,208	AITC	Bimal Ghosh	757	451
Ward No. 20	AITC	Abhaya Bose	2,878	CPI(M)	Anjana Dey	1,247	1,631
Ward No. 21	AITC	Kuntal Roy	1,961	INC	Tapan Dutta	1,307	654
Ward No. 22	CPI(M)	Dipta Karmakar	3,776	AITC	Dhiman Bose	2,569	1,209
Ward No. 23	AITC	Lakshmi Paul	3,247	CPI(M)	Sayantika Chakroborty (Mou)	774	1,145
Ward No. 24	AITC	Pratul Chakraborty	2,102	IND	Bikash Sarkar	2,091	11
Ward No. 25	AITC	Jayanta Saha	2,629	BJP	Santosh Modak	1,367	1,269
Ward No. 26	AITC	Sikta Dey Basu Ray	810	BJP	Anindita Roy Das	629	181
Ward No. 27	AITC	Prasanta Chakraborty	2,225	CPI(M)	Sudip Bhattacharjee	1,216	1,009
Ward No. 28	AITC	Samprita Das	1,577	CPI(M)	Aparna Dalai	1,514	63
Ward No. 29	CPI(M)	Sharadidu Chakraborty	2,494	AITC	Susmita Bose Moitra	1,260	1,234
Ward No. 30	AITC	Sathi Das	2,915	CPI(M)	Manju Karmakar	1,056	1,859
Ward No. 31	AITC	Moumita Mondal	4,833	BJP	Rinku Bagchi	2,653	2,180
Ward No. 32	AITC	Tapas Chatterjee	3,516	BJP	Kajal Das	1,211	2,305
Ward No. 33	AITC	Goutam Deb	4,820	IND	Bijan Sarkar	1,384	3,436
Ward No. 34	AITC	Biman Chandra Tapadar	4,531	CPI(M)	Golap Roy	2,662	1,869
Ward No. 35	AITC	Sampa Nandi	4,632	CPI(M)	Shefali Bhattacharjee	2,732	1,900
Ward No. 36	AITC	Ranjan Shil Sharma	5,911	BJP	Partha Baidya	2,457	3,454
Ward No. 37	AITC	Alak Bhakta	4,325	BJP	Amrit Poddar	3,810	515
Ward No. 38	AITC	Dulal Dutta	5,072	BJP	Nityananda Pal	1,860	3,212
Ward No. 39	AITC	Pinki Saha	3,288	IND	Rina Das	1,726	1,562
Ward No. 40	AITC	Rajesh Prasad Sah	6,677	BJP	Dilip Roy	3,733	2,944
Ward No. 41	AITC	Shivika Mittal	3,115	BJP	Julee Tamang	2,785	330
Ward No. 42	AITC	Shobha Subba	3,537	BJP	Kersensia Kindo	3,370	167
Ward No. 43	AITC	Sukhdeo Mahato	3798	BJP	Sachin Prasad	3,103	695
Ward No. 44	AITC	Pritikana Biswas	4,473	BJP	Iti Acharjee	1,589	2,884
Ward No. 45	CPI(M)	Munshi Nurul Islam	2,036	AITC	Bedabrata Dutta	1,933	103
Ward No. 46	AITC	Dilip Barman	9,549	CPI(M)	Paresh Chandra Sarkar	3,983	5,566
Ward No. 47	AITC	Amar Nanda Das	2,309	CPI(M)	Mukul Sengupta	2,172	137
