= Siliguri Assembly constituency =

Siliguri
- Constituency No. 26 for the West Bengal Legislative Assembly
- Interactive Map Outlining Siliguri Assembly Constituency

Constituency details
- Country: India
- Region: East India
- State: West Bengal
- District: Darjeeling
- Lok Sabha constituency: Darjeeling
- Established: 1951
- Total electors: 201,008
- Reservation: None

Member of Legislative Assembly
- 18th West Bengal Legislative Assembly
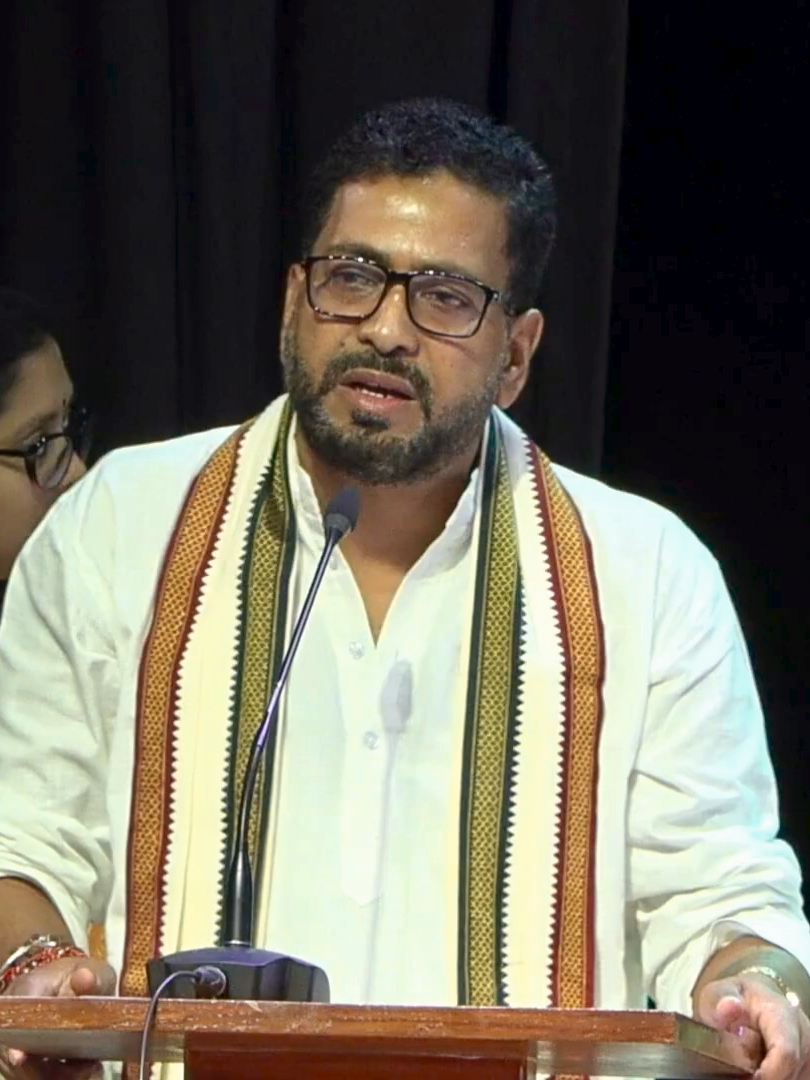
- Incumbent Shankar Ghosh
- Party: Bharatiya Janata Party
- Elected year: 2026
- Preceded by: Ashok Bhattacharya

Most Successful parties from Siliguri assembly
1. Communist Party of India (Marxist) (8 times) (44.5%)
2. Indian National Congress (5 times) (27.8%)
3. Bharatiya Janata Party (2 times) (11.1%)
4. Communist Party of India (1 time) (5.55%)
5. Akhil Bharatiya Gorkha League (1 time) (5.55%)
6. All India Trinamool Congress (1 time) (5.55%)

Siliguri Assembly constituency is an assembly constituency in Darjeeling district in the Indian state of West Bengal.

== Overview ==
As per orders of the Delimitation Commission, No. 26 Siliguri Assembly constituency covers ward nos. 1 to 30 and 45 to 47 of Siliguri Municipal Corporation.

Siliguri Assembly constituency is part of No. 4 Darjeeling (Lok Sabha constituency).

== Members of the Legislative Assembly ==
Election Year	MLA	Party
Siliguri-Kurseong
1951	Tenzing Wangdi	Indian National Congress
	George Mahbert Subba	Independent
Siliguri Constituency
1957	Satyendra Narayan Mazumdar	Communist Party of India
	Tenzing Wangdi	Indian National Congress
1962	Jagadish Chandra Bhattacharjee	Indian National Congress
1967	Arun Kumar Moitra	Indian National Congress
1969	Prem Thapa	Akhil Bharatiya Gorkha League
1971	Arun Kumar Moitra	Indian National Congress
1972	Arun Kumar Moitra	Indian National Congress
1977	Biren Bose	Communist Party of India (Marxist)
1982	Biren Bose	Communist Party of India (Marxist)
1987	Gour Chakraborty	Communist Party of India (Marxist)
1991	Ashok Bhattacharya	Communist Party of India (Marxist)
1996	Ashok Bhattacharya	Communist Party of India (Marxist)
2001	Ashok Bhattacharya	Communist Party of India (Marxist)
2006	Ashok Bhattacharya	Communist Party of India (Marxist)
2011	Rudra Nath Bhattacharya	All India Trinamool Congress
2016	Ashok Bhattacharya	Communist Party of India (Marxist)
2021	Shankar Ghosh	Bharatiya Janata Party
2026	Shankar Ghosh	Bharatiya Janata Party

Ward Nos. 31 to 44 of Siliguri municipal corporation are covered by Dabgram-Phulbari Assembly constituency

== Election results ==
=== 2026 ===
In the 2026 West Bengal Legislative Assembly election, Shankar Ghosh of BJP defeated his nearest rival Goutam Deb of TMC by 73,192 votes.

2026 West Bengal Legislative Assembly election: Siliguri
Party	Candidate	Votes	%	±%
BJP	Shankar Ghosh	120,760	65.78	▲15.75
AITC	Goutam Deb	47,568	25.91	▼4.20
CPI(M)	Saradindu Chakraborty (Joy)	9,168	4.99	▼11.15
INC	Alok Dhara	2,275	1.24	New entry
IND	Tarun Talapatra	567	0.31	New entry
BSP	Priyanka Bose	561	0.31	▼0.39
IND	Suraj Bishwakarma	457	0.25	New entry
IND	Krishna Nand Singh	271	0.15	New entry
AMB	Mamata Das	251	0.14	▼0.19
SUCI(C)	Dr. Shahriar Alam	245	0.13	▼0.08
IND	Sunil Pandit	226	0.12	New entry
NOTA	Nota	1,224	0.67	▼0.49
Majority		73,192	39.87	▲19.95
Turnout		183,573	91.33	▲13.11
Registered electors		201,008		▼11.99
BJP hold		Swing	9.97	

=== 2021 ===
In the 2021 West Bengal Legislative Assembly election, Shankar Ghosh of BJP defeated his nearest rival Omprakash Mishra of TMC.

2021 West Bengal Legislative Assembly election: Siliguri constituency
Party	Candidate	Votes	%	±%
BJP	Shankar Ghosh	89,370	50.03	▲38.57
AITC	Omprakash Mishra	53,784	30.11	
CPI(M)	Ashok Bhattacharya	28,835	16.14	▼30.22
NOTA	None of the above	2,074	1.16	
Majority		35,586	19.92	
Turnout		178,650	78.22	
BJP gain from CPI(M)		Swing		

=== 2016 ===
In the 2016 West Bengal Legislative Assembly election, Ashok Bhattacharya of CPI(M) defeated his nearest rival Bhaichung Bhutia of TMC.

2016 West Bengal Legislative Assembly election: Siliguri constituency
Party	Candidate	Votes	%	±%
CPI(M)	Ashok Bhattacharya	78,054	46.36	
AITC	Bhaichung Bhutia	63,982	38.00	
BJP	Gita Chatterjee	19,300	11.46	
GRC	Rabindra Rai	924	0.55	
BSP	Haridas Thakur	832	0.49	
JMM	Mahendra Kumar Jain	618	0.36	
Independent	Md. Zafar Eqbal	499	0.29	
AMB	Vishwjeet Chatterji	491	0.29	
SUCI(C)	Tanmay Dutta	439	0.26	
ABHM	Dasarath Karmakar	334	0.19	
None of the Above	None of the Above	2,877	1.71	
Majority		14,072	8.36	
Turnout		1,68,350	80.66	
CPI(M) gain from AITC		Swing		

=== 2011 ===
In the 2011 West Bengal Legislative Assembly election, Rudra Nath Bhattacharya of TMC defeated his nearest rival Ashok Bhattacharya of CPI(M).

2011 West Bengal Legislative Assembly election: Siliguri constituency
Party	Candidate	Votes	%	±%
AITC	Rudra Nath Bhattacharya	72,019	48.08	Winner
CPI(M)	Ashok Bhattacharya	67,013	44.73	
BJP	Arun Prasad Sarker	6,069	4.05	
Independent	Hardwar Singh	1,310	0.87	
BSP	Shankar Das	1,054	0.70	
LJP	Hiralal Paswan	1,028	0.69	
AMB	Khushi Ranjan Mondal	804	0.54	
JD(U)	Adhir Singha	503	0.34	
Majority		5,006	3.34	
Turnout		1,49,800	81.28	
AITC gain from CPI(M)		Swing		

=== 2006 ===
In the 2006, 2001, 1996 and 1991 state assembly elections, Ashok Bhattacharya of CPI(M) won the Siliguri assembly seat defeating Nantu Paul of Congress, Prasanta Nandy of Trinamool Congress, Sankar Malakar of Congress and Prasanta Nandy of Congress, respectively. Contests in most years were multi cornered but only winners and runners are being mentioned. Gour Chakraborty of CPI(M) defeated Prasanta Nandy of Congress in 1987. Biren Bose of CPI(M) defeated Krishnendra Narayan Chowdhury and Arun Kumar Moitra, both of Congress, in 1982 and 1977, respectively.

=== 1972 ===
Arun Kumar Moitra of Congress won in 1972 and 1971. Prem Thapa of IGL won in 1969. Arun Kumar Moitra of Congress won in 1967. Jagadish Chandra Bhattacharjee of Congress won in 1962. In 1957, the Siliguri seat was a joint seat with one reserved for scheduled tribes. Satendra Narayan Mazumdar of CPI and Tenzing Wangdi of Congress won in 1957. In independent India's first election in 1951 Kurseong-Siliguri was a joint seat. Tenzing Wangdi of Congress and George Mahbert, Independent, won in 1951.
