= Tapan Sikdar =

Indian politician

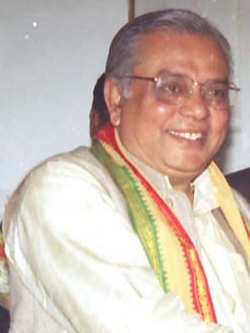
- Tapan Sikdar in 2004

4th President of Bharatiya Janata Party, West Bengal
- In office 1997–1999
- Preceded by: Sukumar Banerjee
- Succeeded by: Vishnu Kant Shastri
- In office 1991–1995
- Preceded by: Dr. Vishnukant Shastri
- Succeeded by: Ashim Kumar Ghosh

Union Minister of State
- In office 13 October 1999 – 22 May 2004
- 13 October 1999 – 1 July 2002: Communications & Information Technology
- 1 July 2002 – 22 May 2004: Chemicals and Fertilizers

Member of Parliament, Lok Sabha
- In office 4 March 1998 — 14 May 2004
- Preceded by: Nirmal Kanti Chatterjee
- Succeeded by: Amitava Nandy
- Constituency: Dum Dum, West Bengal

Personal details
- Born: 20 September 1944
- Died: 2 June 2014 (aged 69) New Delhi, India
- Party: Bharatiya Janata Party
- Education: Malda College (B.Com)
- Profession: Politician

Tapan Sikdar (20 September 1944 – 2 June 2014) was a Union minister of state in the National Democratic Alliance government of India and a Bharatiya Janata Party politician. He was born on 20 September 1944 in Jessore. His father Dr. D. N. Sikdar was a physician. His mother's name was Bela Rani Sikdar. He was member of 12 and 13 Lok Sabha representing Dum Dum (Lok Sabha constituency) in West Bengal.

Tapan Shikdar died on 2 June 2014 in Delhi, AIIMS due to respiratory problems.

== Positions held ==
- 1998 Elected to 12th Lok Sabha
- 1998-99 Member, Committee on External Affairs and its Sub-Committee-III; Member, Committee on Finance; Member, Consultative Committee, Ministry of Water Resources
- 1999 Re-elected to 13th Lok Sabha (2nd term)
- 13 Oct. 1999-2002 Union Minister of State, Ministry of Communications
- 10 Jan - 30 June 2002 Union Minister of State, Ministry of Communications and Information Technology
- 1 July 2002 -2004 Union Minister of State, Ministry of Chemicals and Fertilizers (India)

He was Union Minister of Communications and Information Technology (India). Later he was Union Minister of State, Ministry of Chemicals and Fertilizers. He unsuccessfully contested the Dum Dum Lok Sabha constituency in the 2009 general election where the All India Trinamool Congress candidate (who won and became the MP) got 458,988 votes whereas the Communist Party of India (Marxist) candidate got 438,510 votes) and he polled only 55,679 votes.

== Dr. Syamaprasad Jana Jagaran Manch ==
Dr. Syamaprasad Jana Jagaran Manch is a forum of Bharatiya Janata Party (BJP) dissidents in the Indian state of West Bengal. The forum was launched on 5 December 2004 by former Union Minister Tapan Sikdar.

The organisation held its first convention in Kolkata on 8 March 2006.

The forum is named after Syama Prasad Mookerjee, the founder of Bharatiya Jana Sangh. Sikdar maintains that the organisation is apolitical (in the sense that it is not a political party), and that he still sympathises with BJP.
