= Sukumar Banerjee =

Indian politician (1924–2019)

3rd State President of Bharatiya Janata Party, West Bengal
- In office 2006–2008
- Preceded by: Tathagata Roy
- Succeeded by: Satyabrata Mookherjee
- In office 1986–1991
- Preceded by: Vishnu Kant Shastri
- Succeeded by: Tapan Sikdar

Personal details
- Born: 1924
- Died: 26 July 2019 (aged 94–95)
- Party: Bharatiya Janata Party
- Profession: Politician

Sukumar Banerjee (1924 – 26 July 2019) was an Indian politician from West Bengal. He was president of Bharatiya Janata Party, West Bengal in (1986–1991) and (2006–2008).
