= Rahul Sinha =

Indian politician (born 1963)

Member of Parliament, Rajya Sabha
- Incumbent
- Assumed office 3 April 2026
- Preceded by: Bikash Ranjan Bhattacharya
- Constituency: West Bengal

National Secretary of Bharatiya Janata Party
- In office 11 December 2015 – 26 September 2020
- President: Amit Shah

President of Bharatiya Janata Party, West Bengal
- In office 24 October 2009 – 11 December 2015
- Preceded by: Satyabrata Mookherjee
- Succeeded by: Dilip Ghosh

Personal details
- Born: 20 October 1963 (age 62) Calcutta, West Bengal, India
- Party: Bharatiya Janata Party (since 1980)
- Education: Netaji Nagar College (B.Com)
- Occupation: Politician, businessman

Biswajit Sinha alias Rahul (born 20 October 1963) is an Indian politician, who is serving as Member of Parliament, Rajya Sabha since 2026. Prior to that, he was the State Party President of BJP West Bengal from 2009 until 2015.

== Early life and career ==
Sinha was born on 20 October 1963 in Calcutta, West Bengal. He earned a Bachelor of Commerce degree from the Netaji Nagar College in 1982. He joined Bharatiya Janata Party since the formation in 1980. He was elected as BJP State President in West Bengal for two-consecutive terms (2009 and 2012 respectively).

== Electoral performance ==
Year	Constituency	Legislature	Party	Votes for Sinha		Result
Year	Constituency	Legislature	Party	Pos.	Votes	Result
2006	Jagaddal	Assembly	BJP	2nd	N/A	Lost
2009	Bankura	Lok Sabha	BJP	3rd	42,660	Lost
2014	Kolkata Uttar	Lok Sabha	BJP	2nd	2,47,461	Lost
2016	Jorasanko	Assembly	BJP	2nd	38,476	Lost
2019	Kolkata Uttar	Lok Sabha	BJP	2nd	347,796	Lost
2021	Habra	Assembly	BJP	2nd	86,692	Lost
2026	West Bengal	Rajya Sabha	BJP	Unopposed (Note: Sufficient electors from the BJP MLAs were enough for a majority through proportional representation.)		Elected
