= Department of North Bengal Development =

State government department in West Bengal, India

Department overview
- Jurisdiction: Government of West Bengal
- Headquarters: Uttar Kanya, Siliguri
- Minister responsible: Nisith Pramanik, Cabinet Minister
- Deputy Minister responsible: Biraj Biswas, MoS
- Department executives: Smt. R VIMALA, I.A.S, Secretary; TBA
- Website: Official Website

Department of North Bengal Development, popularly known as the NBDD, is a West Bengal government department. It is an interior ministry mainly responsible for the administration of the North Bengal's seven districts in West Bengal.

== Ministerial team ==
The ministerial team at the NBDD is headed by the Cabinet Minister for North Bengal Development, who may be supported by Ministers of State. Civil servants are assigned to them to manage the ministers' office and ministry. Uttar Kanya is the headquarter of the North Bengal Development department.

== List of ministers ==
- Ashok Bhattacharya (till 2011)
- Goutam Deb (2011–2016)
- Rabindra Nath Ghosh (2016–2021)
- Mamata Banerjee (2021–August 2022)
- Udayan Guha (August 2022–May 2026)
- Nisith Pramanik (from May 2026)
