= Ashim Kumar Ghosh =

19th Governor of Haryana (born 1944)

Professor Ashim Kumar Ghosh
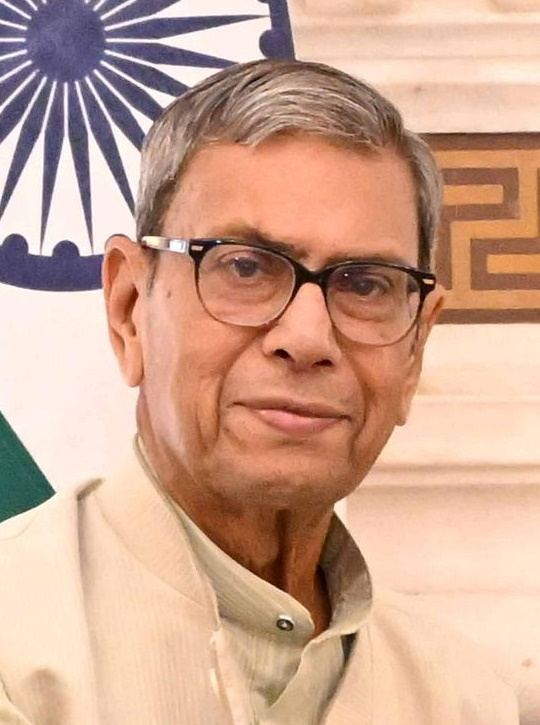
- Ghosh in 2025

Governor of Haryana
- Incumbent
- Assumed office 21 July 2025
- Chief Minister: Nayab Singh Saini
- Preceded by: Bandaru Dattatreya

5th State President of Bharatiya Janata Party, West Bengal
- In office 1999 ‍–‍ 2002
- Preceded by: Tapan Sikdar
- Succeeded by: Tathagata Roy

Personal details
- Born: 12 March 1944 (age 82) Howrah, Bengal Presidency, British India (present-day West Bengal, India)
- Party: Bharatiya Janata Party (since 1991)
- Education: Vidyasagar College (BA); University of Calcutta (MA)
- Occupation: Politician
- Profession: Academician

Ashim Kumar Ghosh (born 12 March 1944) is an Indian academician and politician who is serving as 19th Governor of Haryana. Before that, he served as the president of BJP West Bengal from 1999 to 2002.

== Early life and career ==
Ghosh was born on 12 March 1944 at Howrah, British India. He completed his primary education in Vivekananda Institution, Howrah. He earned a bachelor's and master's degree in political science at Vidyasagar College and Calcutta University respectively. He has served as a professor of political science since 1966.

Ghosh joined Bharatiya Janata Party in 1991. According to Saurav Sikdar, Tapan Sikdar's son, Ghosh was brought to politics by Tapan. He became the party's state secretary in 1996, then as state vice-president in 1998. Prime Minister Atal Bihari Vajpayee recommended him to become the party's state president. After completing his term, he served as the observer for the Tripura BJP unit from 2003 to 2005.

Ghosh was a member of the BJP National Executive from 2004 to 2006. He was appointed as Governor of Haryana by President Droupadi Murmu on 14 July 2025, becoming the third Bengali person after Birendra Narayan Chakraborty and Hari Anand Barari to be appointed as governor of Haryana.

Political offices
Preceded by Bandaru Dattatreya	Governor of Haryana; 21 July 2025 - Present	Incumbent
