= Vivekananda Institution =

Howrah Vivekananda Institution
- Logo

Location
- 75 & 77 Swami Vivekananda Road; Howrah; Howrah, West Bengal 711104; India; 22.5784°N 88.3166°E

Information
- School type: Government Autonomous Boys high school
- Established: February 2, 1923; 103 years ago
- Headmaster: Brajmohan majumdar (2001-2015)Sobhan kumar bera( 2015-2017),Shatdal gayen(2021-2026) Subirkumar bera (2026-present)
- International students: 0
- Classes: 12
- Language: Bengali, English
- Hours in school day: 6
- Classrooms: 50
- Campuses: 1
- Houses: 3
- Colours: Saffron and white for primary house
- Sports: Cricket, football etc
- Affiliations: WBBSE, WBCHSE
- Website: vivekanandainstitution.com

The main building of the school ("Boro Bari") holds classes from VIII to XII

Vivekananda Institution is a high school in West Bengal, India. It is located in the Howrah district of West Bengal. The school was established in 1923 (the first school named after the great Indian sage Swami Vivekananda) and is inspired by his philosophy "Education is the manifestation of the perfection already in man". The school is a leading performer in the secondary and higher secondary exams of the state of West Bengal. The school is located at 75 & 77 Swami Vivekananda Road, Santragachhi, Howrah 711104, India.

== Affiliations ==
The school is affiliated to WBBSE (West Bengal Board of Secondary Education) for tenth Exam and WBCHSE (West Bengal Council of Higher Secondary Education) for 12th exam.

== History ==
The institution is named after the Hindu monk Swami Vivekananda and was established in 1923.

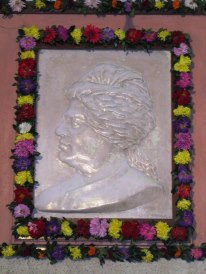
Swami Vivekananda's image at the Swami Vivekananda's birth anniversary ceremony in the school

In 1928, the school was graced by the presence of Swami Shivananda. In 1956 the new main building was inaugurated by Dr. Harendra Coomar Mookerjee, the then Governor of West Bengal.

The principal function of the school is to observe the ‘Swamiji Janmo Tithi’. The presidents of this function in the previous years were men like Ajit Kumar Ghosh, Swami Chidatmananda, Charuchandra Bhattacharya, Kumud Bandhu Sen, Pramathanath B. C., and Mahendranath Sarkar.

Mrigendranath Mukhopadhyay was one of the founders of the institution. Two ex-Headmasters (Sudhangshu Sekhar Bhattacharya and Sri Brojamohan Majumder) were honoured by the government of India when they received the National Award for Teachers.

The institution has a roll strength of about two thousand students from class I to XII. The teaching and non-teaching staff range from 50 to 60.

== Notable alumni ==
- Jahar Das, former Indian football player
- Sankari Prasad Basu, writer
- Ritabrata Ghosh, Visual performer
- Swapan Sadhan Bose, industrialist
- Bholanath Chakraborty, Homeopath doctor
- Nemai Sadhan Basu, historian
- Samyo Bhaumik, Singer, Filmmaker, Writer
- Ashim Kumar Ghosh, 19th Governor of Haryana

== See also ==
- List of schools in Howrah
