= Shankar Ghosh (politician) =

Indian politician

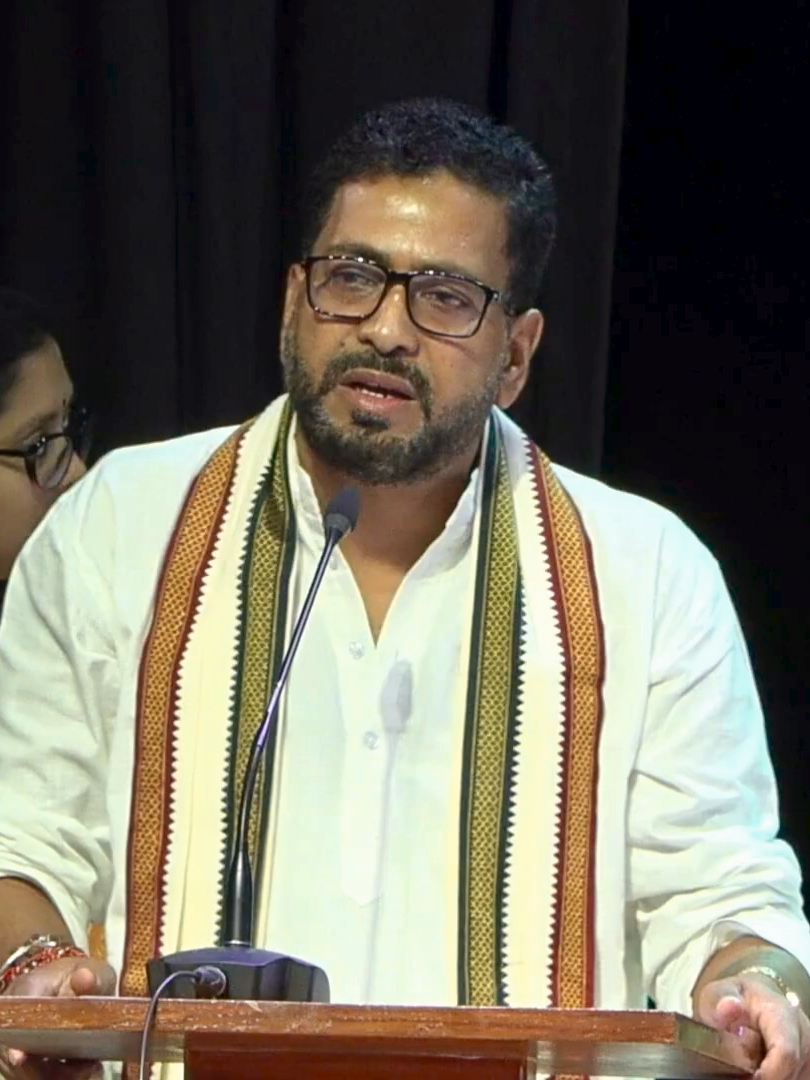
- On 20th June 2026, Bengal Day celebration at WBLA.

Cabinet Minister, Government of West Bengal
- Incumbent
- Assumed office 1 June 2026
- Governor: R. N. Ravi
- Chief Minister: Suvendu Adhikari
- Departments: Tourism; Parliamentary Affairs
- Preceded by: Indranil Sen (Tourism); Sovandeb Chattopadhyay (Parliamentary Affairs)

Member of the West Bengal Legislative Assembly
- Incumbent
- Assumed office 2 May 2021
- Preceded by: Ashok Bhattacharya
- Constituency: Siliguri

Personal details
- Born: 12 June 1974 (age 52) Bishnupur, West Bengal, India
- Party: Bharatiya Janata Party (2021–present)
- Other political affiliations: Communist Party of India (Marxist) (1991–2021)
- Spouse: Sudipa Chowdhury
- Children: 1
- Profession: Politician

Shankar Ghosh (born 12 June 1974) is an Indian politician affiliated with the Bharatiya Janata Party (BJP). He has served as a member of the West Bengal Legislative Assembly from the Siliguri Assembly constituency since 2021. He was re-elected in the 2026 West Bengal Legislative Assembly election. In 2024, he was appointed Chief Whip of the West Bengal Legislative Assembly.

== Political career ==
Shankar Ghosh joined the Students' Federation of India (SFI) in 1991 and the Democratic Youth Federation of India (DYFI) in 1995.

In 2010, he was part of the Indian delegation to the 17th World Festival of Youth and Students held in South Africa. In 2015, he was elected councillor from Ward No. 24 of Siliguri.

He subsequently served as a Member Mayor-in-Council (MMiC) for Education, Sports, Culture, and Youth, and was later additionally entrusted with the Health Department of the Siliguri Municipal Corporation. He also served as a member of the Board of Administrators of the Siliguri Municipal Corporation.

Ghosh joined the Bharatiya Janata Party (BJP) on 12 March, 2021. In the 2021 West Bengal Legislative Assembly election, he was elected as a Member of the Legislative Assembly (MLA) from the Siliguri Assembly constituency, defeating Omprakash Mishra of the All India Trinamool Congress (AITC) by a margin of 35,586 votes. He was re-elected from the constituency in the 2026 West Bengal Legislative Assembly election, defeating Goutam Deb of the AITC by a margin of 73,192 votes.

In May 2026, Ghosh organised a public outreach programme titled “Sorashori Shankar” at Baghajatin Park in Siliguri, where residents from Siliguri and other districts, including Malda, Cooch Behar and Kolkata, presented grievances, complaints and suggestions related to civic and administrative issues. During the programme, attendees raised issues including land disputes and alleged corruption in recruitment. Ghosh stated that the concerns would be communicated to the Chief Minister and relevant government departments. He also announced plans to organise similar ward-level outreach programmes under the Siliguri Municipal Corporation area.

On 1 June 2026, he was sworn in as a Cabinet Minister of West Bengal, along with twelve other members.

== Electoral performance ==
West Bengal Legislative Assembly
Year	Constituency	Party	Votes	%	Opponent	Party	Votes	%	Margin	Result
2026	Siliguri	BJP	1,20,760	65.78	Goutam Deb	AITC	47,568	25.91	73,192	Won

== See also ==
- 2026 West Bengal Legislative Assembly election
- List of chief ministers of West Bengal
- West Bengal Legislative Assembly
- 18th West Bengal Assembly
