= Uttar Kanya =

Administrative headquarters of the West Bengal Government

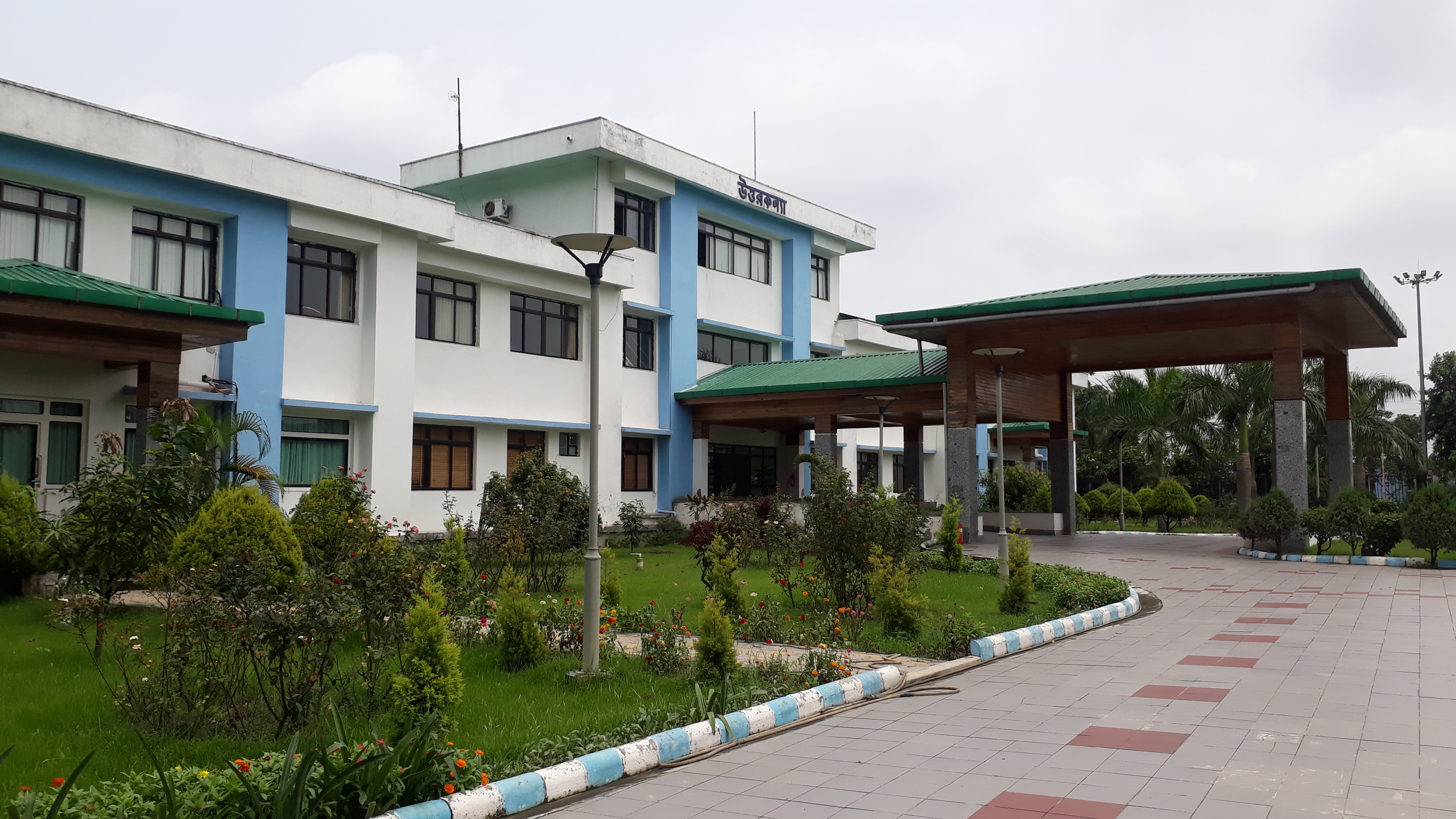
- Front building of Uttar Kanya
- Interactive map of the Uttar Kanya area

General information
- Status: Completed
- Type: Office
- Location: Burdwan Rd, Satellite Township, Fulbari, West Bengal 734015, Siliguri
- Coordinates: 26°40′24″N 88°25′04″E
- Construction started: Nov 2012
- Estimated completion: 20 Jan 2014
- Opened: 20 January 2014
- Owner: Government of West Bengal

Technical details
- Floor count: 2
- Floor area: 80,000

Uttar Kanya is a building in satellite township of which houses the temporary State Secretariat for North Bengal Development Department of West Bengal. It was inaugurated on 20 January 2014 by Chief Minister, Mamata Banerjee.

== Geography ==
Uttar Kanya is located at 26.6734°N 88.4178°E in Siliguri, West Bengal, India.

== History ==
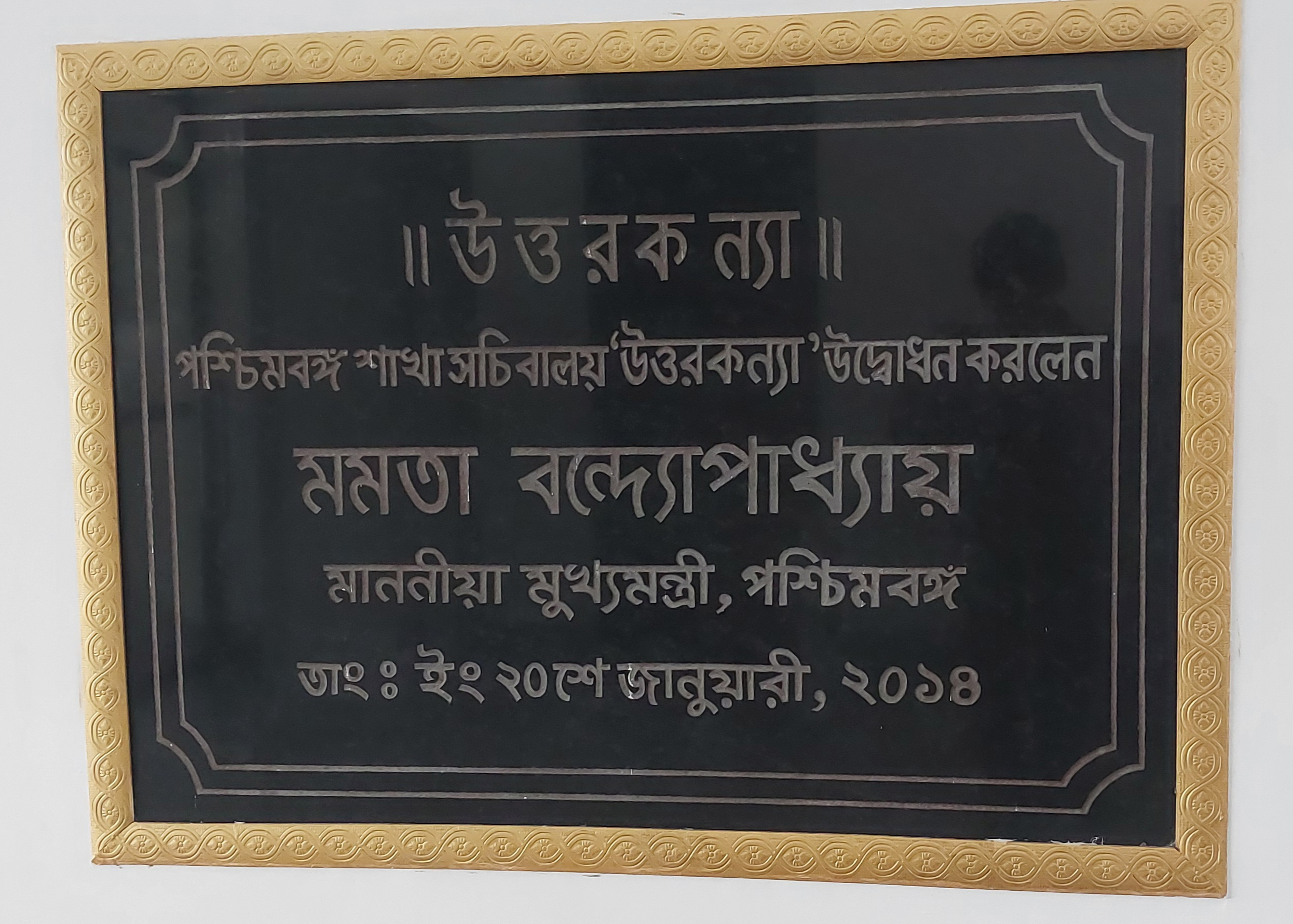
Inauguration plaque of Uttar Kanya

On 20 January 2014, West Bengal Chief Minister Mamata Banerjee had inaugurated the mini-state secretariat for North Bengal in Siliguri, in a bid to expedite development in the region and remove bottlenecks in governance.

== District covers ==
North Bengal comprises eight districts- Darjeeling district, Kalimpong district, Jalpaiguri district, Alipurduar district, Coochbehar district, North Dinajpur, South Dinajpur and Malda district.
