= Ashok Bhattacharya =

Indian politician (born 1949)

Mayor of Siliguri
- In office 12 May 2015 – 21 March 2021
- Preceded by: Gangotri Dutta
- Succeeded by: Goutam Deb (As Chairman for Board of Administrators)

Cabinet Minister of Government of West Bengal
- In office 1996–2011
- Chief Minister: Jyoti Basu; Buddhadeb Bhattacharjee
- Department: North Bengal Development; Urban Development and Municipal Affairs
- Preceded by: Prasanta Chandra Sur
- Succeeded by: Firhad Hakim (Urban Development and Municipal Affairs); Goutam Deb (North Bengal Development)

Member of Legislative Assembly of West Bengal
- In office 2016–2021
- Preceded by: Rudra Nath Bhattacharya
- Succeeded by: Shankar Ghosh
- Constituency: Siliguri
- In office 1991–2011
- Preceded by: Gour Chakraborty
- Succeeded by: Rudra Nath Bhattacharya
- Constituency: Siliguri

Personal details
- Born: 1 April 1949 (age 77) Siliguri, West Bengal, India
- Party: Communist Party of India (Marxist)
- Spouse: Ratna Bhattacharjee (died 2021)
- Education: University of North Bengal (B.Com)
- Profession: Politician, Social worker

Ashok Bhattacharya is an Indian politician and the former mayor of Siliguri Municipal Corporation in the state of West Bengal. He is a member of Communist Party of India (Marxist) (CPI(M)). He is a prominent leader of CPI(M) in the northern region of West Bengal. He was the Minister of Urban Development and Municipal Affairs in the Government of West Bengal for three consecutive terms (1996–2011).

== Early life ==
He was born in 1949 in Siliguri of West Bengal in Independent India. He completed his graduation from University of North Bengal in Siliguri, West Bengal.

== Political career ==
Ashok Bhattacharya started his political career as a corporator in Siliguri Municipal Corporation. He became the chairman of Siliguri municipality in 1987 and remained as the chairman till 1991. He was elected to the West Bengal Legislative Assembly from Siliguri (Vidhan Sabha constituency) as a CPI(M) candidate for the first time in 1991. He is a five-time MLA of West Bengal Legislative Assembly from Siliguri. He won elections from Siliguri in 1991, 1996, 2001, 2006 and 2016. In 1996, he became the Minister for Urban Development and Municipal Affairs in the Left Front Government in West Bengal under chief minister Jyoti Basu. He also continued as cabinet minister under chief minister Buddhadeb Bhattacharjee till 2011 when the Left Front Government lost the power to All India Trinamool Congress (AITC). In 2011 West Bengal Legislative Assembly election, he was defeated by AITC candidate Rudra Nath Bhattacharya in Siliguri. But he won from Siliguri again in 2016 West Bengal Legislative Assembly election against AITC candidate and former captain of India national football team Bhaichung Bhutia.

In May 2015, Ashok Bhattacharya became the Mayor of Siliguri Municipal Corporation after the Left Front won the municipal election in Siliguri. Ashok Bhattacharya lost the Siliguri corporation election 2021 by Md Alam Khan of TMC from ward number 6.

State Legislative Assembly
Preceded by Rudra Nath Bhattacharya; All India Trinamool Congress	Member of the West Bengal Legislative Assembly from Siliguri Assembly constituency 2016-2021	Succeeded by Shankar Ghosh; Bharatiya Janata Party
Political offices
Preceded by Prasanta Chandra Sur	Cabinet Minister for Urban Development and Municipal Affairs in the West Bengal Government; 1996 – 2011	Succeeded by Firhad Hakim
Civic offices
Preceded by Gangotri Dutta	Mayor of Siliguri Municipal Corporation; 2015 – 2021	Succeeded by Goutam Deb
