= 2022 Bidhannagar Municipal Corporation election =

Election to Bidhannagar Municipal Corporation, 2022

- 12 February 2022

All 41 seats in Bidhannagar Municipal Corporation 21 seats needed for a majority

	First party	Second party	Third party
Party	AITC	INC	Independents
Last election	40	1	1
Seats won	39	1	1
Seat change	▼1	Steady	Steady
Mayor before election
Krishna Chakraborty
AITC
Elected mayor
Krishna Chakraborty
AITC

The 2022 Bidhannagar Municipal Corporation election was held on 12 February 2022 to elect 41 members of the Bidhannagar Municipal Corporation (BMC) which governs Bidhannagar, the Satellite city of the capital city of Indian state of West Bengal, Kolkata in the district of North 24 Parganas.

== Schedule ==
Poll event	Schedule
Notification date	28 December 2021
Last Date for filing nomination	3 January 2022
Last Date for withdrawal of nomination	6 January 2022
Date of poll	12 February 2022
Date of counting of votes	14 February 2022

== Parties and alliances ==
Following is a list of political parties and alliances which contested in this election:

Party	Symbol	Alliance	No. of contesting candidates
All India Trinamool Congress (AITC)		None	41
All India Forward Bloc (AIFB)		Left Front	2
Communist Party of India (CPI)		Left Front	2
Communist Party of India (Marxist) (CPI(M))		Left Front	35
Bharatiya Janata Party (BJP)		None	41
Indian National Congress (INC)		None	29
Socialist Unity Centre of India (Communist) (SUCI)		None	2
Independents (IND)		None	53

== Candidates ==
List of candidates
Ward		Reservation	AITC		Left Front		BJP		INC	
#	Name	SC/ST/Women	Party	Candidate	Party	Candidate	Party	Candidate	Party	Candidate
1	Ward No. 1	None	AITC	PINAKI NANDI	CPI(M)	Ujjwal KANTI Paul	BJP	Ashutosh Paul	INC	Alamgir Hossain
2	Ward No. 2	Women	AITC	Rahima Bibi Mondal	CPI(M)	Susmita Fouzder	BJP	Dola Ghosh	INC	Zeba Shaheen
3	Ward No. 3	None	AITC	Aratrika Bhattacharjee	CPI(M)	Arafat Ali Mondal	BJP	Abhijit Das	INC	Monsur Ali Mondal
4	Ward No. 4	None	AITC	SK RAFIQUEL ISLAM l	CPI(M)	Ashim Kumar Ghosh	BJP	Abhijeet Kumar Shaw	INC	Surendra Singh
5	Ward No. 5	Women	AITC	Nandini Banerjee	CPI(M)	Priyanka Barman	BJP	Sikha Das	INC	Sandhya Roy
6	Ward No. 6	None	AITC	Samrat Barua	CPI(M)	Debashis Hazra	BJP	Raju Singh	INC	Sk Azar Uddin
7	Ward No. 7	None	AITC	Debraj Chakraborty	CPI(M)	Hannan Ali Ostagar	BJP	Sanjoy Das	INC	Jamil Ahemad
8	Ward No. 8	Women	AITC	Suparna Ghosh Paul	CPI(M)	Sathi Chakraborty	BJP	Swagata Deb	INC supports CPI(M)	
9	Ward No. 9	None	AITC	Samaraesh Chakraborty	CPI(M)	Rabin Mondal	BJP	Bhaskar Naskar	INC supports CPI(M)	
10	Ward No. 10	None	AITC	Pranay Kumar Ray	CPI(M)	Amarnath Guha	BJP	Amor Dutta	INC supports CPI(M)	
11	Ward No. 11	SC	AITC	Anita Biswas	CPI(M)	Debasish Kumar Naskar	BJP	Suvojit Das	INC	Sudip Mondal
12	Ward No. 12	Women	AITC	Salima Bibi Mondal	CPI(M)	Rinku Rahaman	BJP	Taniya Singha Roy	INC	Rumina Sultana
13	Ward No. 13	None	AITC	Md. Sirajul Haque	CPI(M)	Md. Mohasin Ahmed	BJP	Tinku Biswas	INC	Md. Surabuddin Peada
14	Ward No. 14	SC Women	AITC	Sikha Mohanta	AIFB	Anima Mondal	BJP	Tumpa Howlader	INC	Gita Sardar
15	Ward No. 15	None	AITC	Sujit Mondal	CPI(M)	Sajal Kumar Saha	BJP	Tapan Ghosh	INC supports CPI(M)	
16	Ward No. 16	Women	AITC	Jayashri Bagui	Left Front supported Independent candidate Swagata Mazumder		BJP	Susmita Sen	INC	Kakali Bagui Ghosh
17	Ward No. 17	None	AITC	Ashutosh Nandi	Left Front supported Independent candidate Shambu Nath Dey		BJP	Arun Kumar Hait	INC	Samir Roy
18	Ward No. 18	None	AITC	Indranath Bagui	CPI(M)	Nilratan Roy	BJP	Anupam Banik	INC	Debasis Chatterjee
19	Ward No. 19	Women	AITC	Piyali Sarkar	CPI(M)	Mithu Dutta	BJP	Sunita Ghosh	INC supports CPI(M)	
20	Ward No. 20	SC	AITC	Prosenjit Nag	CPI(M)	Jayanta Das	BJP	Debrabata Haldar	INC supports CPI(M)	
21	Ward No. 21	None	AITC	Monoranjan Ghosh	CPI(M)	Sanjoy Biswas	BJP	Nihar Sarkar	INC supports CPI(M)	
22	Ward No. 22	SC	AITC	Atindra Prasad Sana	CPI(M)	Soumya Kanti Roy	BJP	Sujan Krishna Howladar	INC	Raman Poddar
23	Ward No. 23	SC Women	AITC	Jhunku Mondal	CPI(M)	Debika Das Mondal	BJP	Saraswati Biswas	INC supports CPI(M)	
24	Ward No. 24	None	AITC	Manish Mukherjee	CPI(M)	Aloke Kumar Roy	BJP	Swapan Sikder	INC	Prabhat Saha
25	Ward No. 25	Women	AITC	Purnima Naskar	CPI(M)	Soma Mitra	BJP	Dipa Naskar	INC	Mira Poddar
26	Ward No. 26	None	AITC	Susobhan Mondal	CPI(M)	Gouri Nandi	BJP	Sadhana Dhali	INC	Jaydeb Dey
27	Ward No. 27	None	AITC	Bina Mondal	CPI(M)	Subham Das	BJP	Sankar Mondal	INC supports CPI(M)	
28	Ward No. 28	ST	AITC	Prabir Sardar	CPI(M)	Belpati Munda	BJP	Indrajit Prasad Singh	INC	Kesto Munda
29	Ward No. 29	Women	AITC	Krishna Chakraborty	CPI(M)	Saswati Dutta	BJP	Mitali Mukherjee	INC	Sikha Bhattacharjee
30	Ward No. 30	None	AITC	Anita Mondal	CPI(M)	Arindam Das	BJP	Uma Shankar Ghoshdastidar	INC	Sagar Dutta
31	Ward No. 31	None	AITC	Sabyasachi Dutta	AIFB	Bimalesh Thakur	BJP	Devasis Jana	INC	Partha Dey
32	Ward No. 32	Women	AITC	Kakali Saha	CPI(M)	Sukanta Banerjee	BJP	Piyali Basu	INC	Indrani Bhattacharya
32	Ward No. 32	Women	AITC	Kakali Saha	CPI	Suhita Basu Mallik	BJP	Piyali Basu	INC	Indrani Bhattacharya
33	Ward No. 33	None	AITC	Banibrata Banerjee	CPI(M)	Basab Basak	BJP	Molly Paul	INC	Susanta Mondal
34	Ward No. 34	None	AITC	Alokananda Das	CPI(M)	Kamal Kumar Patra	BJP	Kaushik Biswas	INC	Mriganka Mallick
35	Ward No. 35	SC	AITC	Jaydev Naskar	CPI(M)	Santanu Bar	BJP	Biswanath Panja	INC supports CPI(M)	
36	Ward No.36	Women	AITC	Chamili Naskar	CPI(M)	Chandana Mondal	BJP	Shampa Debnath	INC	Shibani Munda
37	Ward No. 37	SC Women	AITC	Minu Das Chakraborty	CPI(M)	Soma Pramanik Ghosh	BJP	Promita Saha	INC supports CPI(M)	
38	Ward No. 38	SC	AITC	Alo Dutta	CPI(M)	Anup Malik	BJP	Mintu Maity	INC supports CPI(M)	
39	Ward No. 39	None	AITC	Rajesh Chirimar	CPI(M)	Radhanath Chand	BJP	Soumyadeep Bhattacharya	INC	Dilip Kumar Bhattacharya
40	Ward No. 40	None	AITC	Tulsi Sinha Roy	CPI	Sumanta Basu	BJP	Mrinmoy Kanti Sorcar	INC	Ashok Kundu
41	Ward No. 41	Women	AITC	Ratna Bhaumik	CPI(M)	Sutanuka bandopadhyay	BJP	Priyanka Chakraborty	INC	Pooja Parajita Roychoudhury

== Result ==
=== Party-wise Result ===
39	1	1
AITC	INC	IND

Vote share by alliance
1. AITC (74.1%)
2. LF (10.9%)
3. BJP (8.20%)
4. INC (3.42%)
5. IND (3.28%)
6. Others (0.04%)
