= 2022 Chandernagore Municipal Corporation election =

Election to Chandernagore Municipal Corporation, 2022

- 12 February 2022

All 33 seats in Chandernagore Municipal Corporation 17 seats needed for a majority

	First party	Second party
Party	AITC	CPI(M)
Alliance		LF
Last election	31 seats	2 seats
Mayor before election
Ram Chakraborty
AITC
Elected mayor
Ram Chakraborty
AITC

The 2022 Chandernagore Municipal Corporation election was held on 12 February 2022 to elect 33 members of the Chandernagore Municipal Corporation (CMC) which governs Chandernagore and Mankundu, the twin cities in the Hooghly district Indian state of West Bengal.

== Schedule ==
Poll event	Schedule
Notification date	28 Dec, 2021
Last Date for filing nomination	3 Jan, 2022
Last Date for withdrawal of nomination	6 Jan, 2022
Date of poll	12 Feb, 2022
Date of counting of votes	14 Feb, 2022

== Parties and alliances ==
Following is a list of political parties and alliances which contested in this election:

Party	Symbol	Alliance	No. of contesting candidates
All India Trinamool Congress (AITC)		None	33
All India Forward Bloc (AIFB)		Left Front	3
Communist Party of India (Marxist) (CPI(M))		Left Front	29
Bharatiya Janata Party (BJP)		None	33
Indian National Congress (INC)		None	19
Independents (IND)		None	3

== Candidates ==
List of candidates
Ward		Reservation	AITC		Left Front		BJP		INC	
#	Name	SC/Women	Party	Candidate	Party	Candidate	Party	Candidate	Party	Candidate
1	Ward No. 1	None	AITC	Papia Singha Roy	CPI(M)	Chinmoy Biswas	BJP	Gopal Choubey	INC	Sukumar Mal
2	Ward No. 2	None	AITC	Mohit Nandi	CPI(M)	Somnath Ganguly	BJP	Indrani Mitra	INC	Sandip Kumar Banerjee
3	Ward No. 3	Women	AITC	Gitanjali Seth	Left Front supported Independent candidate Sipra Dey		BJP	Sanchita Dey	INC supports Left Front	
4	Ward No. 4	None	AITC	Animesh Banerjee	CPI(M)	Somnath Pal	BJP	Arunava Sarkar	INC	Prabir Kumar Das
5	Ward No. 5	None	AITC	Monika Mandal	CPI(M)	Gopal Shukla	BJP	Rina Ghosh	INC supports CPI(M)	
6	Ward No. 6	Women	AITC	Moumita Banerjee	CPI(M)	Rekha Tiwari	BJP	Sipra Ghosh	INC	Mamata Das
7	Ward No. 7	None	AITC	Partha Sarathi Dutta	CPI(M)	Sumit Sarkar	BJP	Narayan Das	INC supports CPI(M)	
8	Ward No. 8	None	AITC	Om Prakash Mahato	CPI(M)	Bappaditya Roy	BJP	Subrata Singha	INC	Tapan Dey
9	Ward No. 9	Women	AITC	Snigdha Ray	CPI(M)	Suchandra Dutta	BJP	Ranju Singh	INC supports CPI(M)	
10	Ward No. 10	None	AITC	Ajoy Ghosh	CPI(M)	Sobhanlal Sengupta	BJP	Samit Bandyopadhyay	INC	Sunil Chaudhuri
11	Ward No. 11	None	AITC	Md Samad Ali	CPI(M)	Md Mahboob Alam	BJP	Sanjoy Kumar Ghosh	INC	Shek Sabir
12	Ward No. 12	Women	AITC	Rituparna Shaw Mondal	CPI(M)	Meena Sharma	BJP	Kiran Adhikari	INC	Mithu Biswas(Majumder)
13	Ward No. 13	None	AITC	Subhojit Shaw	CPI(M)	Nilmoni Konar	BJP	Srabani Malik	INC	Debashish Das
14	Ward No. 14	None	AITC	Ranjit Kundu	CPI(M)	Oikatan Dasgupta	BJP	Abhijit Dhara	INC	Manoj Kumar Bose
15	Ward No. 15	None	AITC	Mamata Dutta Patra	CPI(M)	Anindita Chattopadhyay	BJP	Laxmi Pasman	INC supports CPI(M)	
16	Ward No. 16	None	AITC	Samir Guha Mallik	CPI(M)	Abhijit Sen	BJP	Somnath Das	INC supports CPI(M)	
17	Ward No. 17	None	AITC	Sujit Kumar Nath	CPI(M)	Asoke Ganguly	BJP	Soumen Das	INC	Mukul De
18	Ward No. 18	SC	AITC	Sabita Das	CPI(M)	Sanjay Das	BJP	Sekhar Biswas	INC supports CPI(M)	
19	Ward No. 19	Women	AITC	Supriti Dutta	CPI(M)	Pampa Chatterjee Adhikary	BJP	Sunabda Saha	INC	Pinki Dey
20	Ward No. 20	None	AITC	Pijush Biswas	CPI(M)	Debojit Biswas	BJP	Runa Kar	INC	Palash Kanti Roy
21	Ward No. 21	None	AITC	Suvendu Mukherjee	CPI(M)	Sujit Dey	BJP	Tapas Ray	INC	Ashok Roy
22	Ward No. 22	Women	AITC	Soma Roy Chowdhury	CPI(M)	Lipika Chakraborty	BJP	Madhabi Bag Santra	INC	Soma Roy Chowdhury
23	Ward No. 23	None	AITC	Prosenjit Mukherjee	CPI(M)	Tapas Kumar Ghosh	BJP	Ashutosh Ghosh	INC	Ashoke Kumar Khan
24	Ward No. 24	None	AITC	Hiranmay Chatterjee	CPI(M)	Subhadip Dey	BJP	Avijit Panda	INC	Nikhil Kumar Ghosh
25	Ward No. 25	Women	AITC	Indu Barman	AIFB	Mausumi Kumari Thakur (Sharma)	BJP	Rita Chowdhary	INC supports AIFB	
26	Ward No. 26	SC Women	AITC	Sarada Choudhury	AIFB	Ritika Choudhury	BJP	Sandhya Das	INC supports AIFB	
27	Ward No. 27	None	AITC	Binay Kumar Shaw	CPI(M)	Swarup Ghosh	BJP	Dipa Choudhary	INC supports CPI(M)	
28	Ward No. 28	SC Women	AITC	Puja Patra	CPI(M)	Labanya Ghosh	BJP	Soma Roy	INC supports CPI(M)	
29	Ward No. 29	SC	AITC	Bimal Patra	CPI(M)	Sunil Kumar Patra	BJP	Manik Roy	INC supports CPI(M)	
30	Ward No. 30	None	AITC	Ram Chakraborty	CPI(M)	Sk. Luftar Rahaman	BJP	Prabir Pakira	INC	Biswajit Mitra
31	Ward No. 31	None	AITC	Munna Agarwal	AIFB	Arup Kumar Das	BJP	Nemai Das	INC	Hiran Kumar Ghosh
32	Ward No. 32	Women	AITC	Subhra Das	CPI(M)	Gita Das	BJP	Priya Patra(Biswas)	INC supports CPI(M)	
33	Ward No. 33	None	AITC	Sima Das	CPI(M)	Dhiren Saha	BJP	Babla Samaddar	INC supports CPI(M)	

== Result ==
=== Party-wise result ===
31	2
AITC	CPI(M)

Vote share by alliance
1. AITC (59.4%)
2. LF (28.7%)
3. BJP (9.80%)
4. INC (1.50%)
5. IND (0.56%)
6. Others (0.00%)

Alliance	Party	Seats					Popular Vote			
Alliance	Party	Contested	Won		Change	Earned Second Position	Votes	%		Change (%)
Alliance	Party	Contested	Party-wise	Alliance-wise	Change	Earned Second Position	Votes	Party-wise	Alliance-wise	Change (%)
None	AITC	32	31		▲10	2	62,352	59.42		▲
Left Front	CPI(M)	29	2	2	▼5	24	27,699	26.40	28.72	▼
Left Front	AIFB	3	0	2	▼1	2	1020	0.97	28.72	▼
Left Front	Independent(Supported by Left Front	1	0	2	Steady	1	1414	1.42	28.72	▲
None	BJP	33	0		▼1	1	10,283	9.80		▼
None	INC	19	0		▼3	1	1572	1.50		▼
None	Independents	2	0		Steady	0	597	0.56		▼
Total Polled Votes / Voter Turnout										
Registered Voters

Seat share by alliance
1. AITC (93.9%)
2. LF (6.04%)

=== Ward-wise result ===
The Ward-wise Results were announced by the West Bengal State Election Commission after the counting.

Results
	Winner			Runner Up			Margin
Ward number	Party	Candidate	Votes	Party	Candidate	Votes	Margin
Ward No. 1	AITC	Papia Singha Roy	2776	CPI(M)	Chinmoy Biswas	1605	1171
Ward No. 2	AITC	Mohit Nandi	1851	CPI(M)	Somnath Ganguly	1352	499
Ward No. 3	AITC	Gitanjali Seth	1457	Ind (supported by LF)	Sipra Dey	1414	43
Ward No. 4	AITC	Animesh Banerjee(Babai)	1859	CPI(M)	Somnath Pal	611	1248
Ward No. 5	AITC	Monika Mandal	1704	CPI(M)	Gopal Shukla	803	901
Ward No. 6	AITC	Moumita Banerjee(Riya)	1035	CPI(M)	Rekha Tiwari	1022	13
Ward No. 7	AITC	Partha Sarathi Dutta	1804	CPI(M)	Sumit Sarkar(Chotka)	745	1059
Ward No. 8	AITC	Om Prakash Mahato	2597	CPI(M)	Bappaditya Roy	2283	314
Ward No. 9	AITC	Snigdha Ray	2168	CPI(M)	Suchandra Dutta	861	1307
Ward No. 10	AITC	Ajoy Ghosh	1730	CPI(M)	Sobhanlal Sengupta	1052	678
Ward No. 11	AITC	Md Samad Ali(Chunna)	2557	CPI(M)	Md. Mahboob Alam	1072	1485
Ward No. 12	AITC	Rituparna Shaw Mondal	2241	INC	Mithu Biswas(Majumdar)	488	1753
Ward No. 13	AITC	Subhojit Shaw	1582	CPI(M)	Nilmoni Konar	952	630
Ward No. 14	AITC	Ranjit Kundu	1486	CPI(M)	Oikatan Dasgupta(Top)	1431	55
Ward No. 15	AITC	Mamata Dutta Patra	1835	CPI(M)	Anindita Chattopadhyay	1341	494
Ward No. 16	CPI(M)	Abhijit Sen(Hada)	1549	AITC	Samir Guha Mallick(Kalua)	1426	123
Ward No. 17	CPI(M)	Asoke Ganguly(Monu)	1018	AITC	Sujit Kumar Nath	888	130
Ward No. 18	AITC	Sabita Das	2243	CPI(M)	Sanjoy Das(Sujoy)	806	1437
Ward No. 19	AITC	Supriti Dutta	1926	CPI(M)	Pampa Chatterjee Adhikary	1114	812
Ward No. 20	AITC	Pijush Biswas	2754	CPI(M)	Debojit Biswas(Chandan)	723	2031
Ward No. 21	AITC	Suvendu Mukherjee(Shovon)	2922	CPI(M)	Sujit Dey	1193	1729
Ward No. 22	AITC	Soma Roy Chowdhury	2332	CPI(M)	Lipika Chakraborty	930	1402
Ward No. 23	AITC	Prosenjit Mukherjee	1896	CPI(M)	Tapas Mukherjee	806	1090
Ward No. 24	AITC	Hiranmay Chatterjee(Kalu)	1857	CPI(M)	Subhadip Dey	348	1509
Ward No. 25	AITC	Indu Barman (Saha)	2069	AIFB	Mausumi Kumari Thakur (Sharma)	320	1749
Ward No. 26	AITC	Sarada Choudhury	1774	BJP	Sandhya Das	1078	696
Ward No. 27	AITC	Binay Kumar Shaw(Vicky)	943	CPI(M)	Swarup Ghosh	251	692
Ward No. 28	AITC	Puja Patra	1748	CPI(M)	Labanya Ghosh	752	996
Ward No. 29	AITC	Bimal Patra(Chhotka)	2180	CPI(M)	Sunil Kumar Patra	748	1432
Ward No. 30	AITC	Ram Chakraborty	2619	CPI(M)	Sk. Luftar Rahaman(Danny)	803	1816
Ward No. 31	AITC	Munna Agarwal	1656	AIFB	Arup Kumar Das	543	1113
Ward No. 32	AITC	Subhra Das	1549	CPI(M)	Gita Das	598	951
Ward No. 33	AITC	Sima Das (Moni)	1740	CPI(M)	Dhiren Saha	1585	155

== By-elections ==
Date	District	Body	Ward No.	Winning Party	Runner Up	Margin
26 June 2022	Hooghly	Chandernagore Municipal Corporation	17	CPI(M)	AITC	130
