= Satyabrata Mookherjee =

Indian politician (1932–2023)

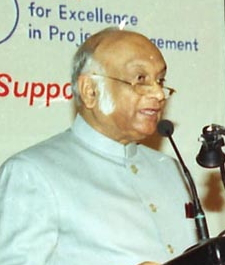

Member of Parliament, Lok Sabha
- In office 1999–2004
- Preceded by: Ajoy Mukhopadhyay
- Succeeded by: Jyotirmoyee Sikdar
- Constituency: Krishnanagar

Union Minister of State for Commerce & Industry
- In office 1 July 2002 – 13 May 2004

Union Minister of State For Chemicals & Fertilizers
- In office 1 September 2000 – 3 June 2002

7th President of Bharatiya Janata Party, West Bengal
- In office 2008–2009
- Preceded by: Sukumar Banerjee
- Succeeded by: Rahul Sinha

Personal details
- Born: 8 May 1932 Sylhet, Assam Province, British India
- Died: 3 March 2023 (aged 90) Kolkata, West Bengal, India
- Party: Bharatiya Janata Party
- Education: Calcutta University
- Profession: Advocate
- Nickname: Jolu

Satyabrata Mookherjee (Bengali: সত্যব্রত মুখার্জী; 8 May 1932 – 3 March 2023) was an Indian Union minister of state and the president of BJP's West Bengal state unit from 2008 before being replaced by Rahul Sinha in October 2009. He was minister of state for Chemicals and Fertilizers (September 2000 – June 2002) and later for Commerce and Industry (July 2002 – October 2003) in Atal Bihari Vajpayee ministry.

== Career ==
Mookherjee was born on 8 May 1932 in Sylhet in Assam (now Bangladesh), he was educated at Calcutta University. He did his Bar-at-law from The Honourable Society of Lincoln's Inn and also pursued further studies at the Regent Street Polytechnic in London.

Mookherjee being a Senior Advocate, was an additional solicitor general of India before being elected, in 1999, to the 13th Lok Sabha from Krishnagar (Lok Sabha constituency) in West Bengal as a candidate of Bharatiya Janata Party.

== Personal life and death ==
Mookherjee was the nephew of Sankar Das Banerji, Speaker of West Bengal.

Mookherjee died on 3 March 2023, at age 90 in Kolkata.
