= Vishnu Kant Shastri =

Indian politician (1929-2005)

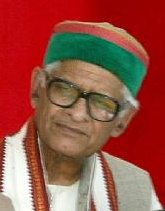

16th Governor of Uttar Pradesh
- In office 24 November 2000 – 2 July 2004
- Preceded by: Suraj Bhan
- Succeeded by: Sudarshan Agrawal (acting)

13th Governor of Himachal Pradesh
- In office 2 December 1999 – 23 November 2000
- Preceded by: V. S. Ramadevi
- Succeeded by: Suraj Bhan

Member of Parliament, Rajya Sabha
- In office 1992–1997

Personal details
- Born: 2 May 1929
- Died: 17 April 2005 (aged 75)
- Education: University of Calcutta

Vishnu Kant Shastri (2 May 1929 – 17 April 2005) was an Indian politician who served as the governor of Uttar Pradesh and Himachal Pradesh. He was also an academic, scholar, poet, philosopher, author, critic, orator, editor and administrator.

== Early life ==
A native of Kolkata, Vishnu Kant Shastri completed his B.A. LLB and M.A. from the University of Calcutta and chose to become a lecturer in Hindi. After 41 years, he retired as Acharya of the Hindi department of the University of Calcutta in 1994, marking the end of his academic career.

== Politics ==
Associated with Rashtriya Swayamsevak Sangh, he entered active politics and served as a member of the West Bengal Legislative Assembly in 1977 from the Jorasanko Assembly constituency. He went on to become one of the founding members of the Bharatiya Janata Party in 1980 and a member of the Rajya Sabha in 1992.

He was appointed Governor of Himachal Pradesh on 2 December 1999, serving until 23 November 2000 and, the following day, 24 November, was sworn in as Governor of Uttar Pradesh, where he served until 2004, less than a year before his death.

== Literature ==
Vishnu Kant Shastri was a well-known figure in the Hindi literary world and authored several books, including: Kavi Nirala Ki Kavya Vedna Tatha Anya Nibandh, Kuch Chandan Ki Kuch Kapur Ki, Chintan Mudra, Anuchintan (literary criticism), Tulsi Ke Hiye Heyri (essay on Tulsidas), Bangla Desh Ke Sandarbh Main (reportage), Smaran Ko Patheya Banahe Do, Sudhiyan Us Chandan Ke Van Ki (travelogue and reminiscence), Bhakti Aur Sharanagati, Gyan Aur Karma (thought-philosophy), Anant Path Ke Pathik-Dharamveer Bharti, Jeevan Path Par Chalte Chalte (poetry).

Apart from translating several Bengali and English poems into Hindi, he translated several books into Hindi as well, including: Upma Kalidasasya (Bangla to Hindi), Sankalp-Santras-Sankalp (Poetic translation of fiery poems of Bangla Desh) and Mahatma Gandhi Ka Samaj Darshan (English to Hindi).

Some of the several accolades and laurels Vishnu Kant Shastri won for his literary efforts were "Acharya Ramchandra Shukla Puruskar" by the Government of Uttar Pradesh for his book Kuch Chandan Ki Kuch Kapur Ki in 1972-73, the Government's State Literary Award for his book Bangla Desh Ke Sandarbh Mein in 1974-75, Special Award by U.P. Hindi Sansthan for Smaran Ko Patheya Banahe Do (1978–79), Special Award by Ramayan Mahotsava Pratishthan, Chitrakoot, U.P. for his work on the literature of Tulsidas (1979), Sahitya Bhushan Samman, Dr. Ram Manohar Lohia Samman, Rajrishi Tandon Hindi Sevi Samman, special lecture on "Ram Charit Manas mein Gyan Aur Karma" as lecturer at Rama Krishna Mission Institute of Culture (1979).

== Family ==
At age 75, Vishnu Kant Shastri was travelling on the Danapur Express to Patna, intending to provide a discourse on Gita, when he suffered a fatal heart attack. He was married to Indira Devi from 26 January 1953 until her death in 1988. They had one daughter, Bharti Sharma, who survives him.
