= Goutam Deb =

Mayor, Siliguri Municipal Corporation

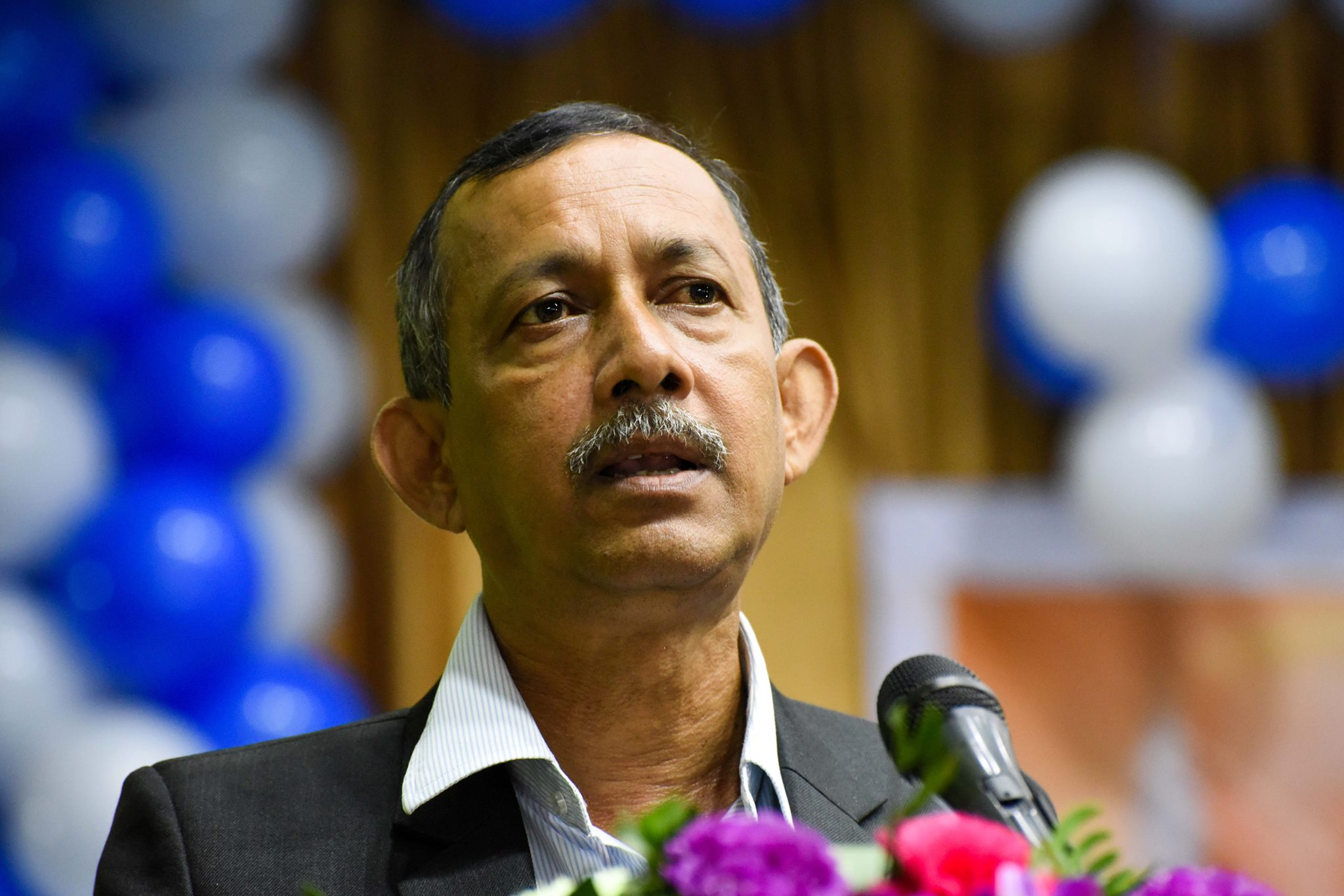
- Goutam Deb delivering a speech at a seminar.

5th Mayor of Siliguri
- In office 22 February 2022 – 19 June 2026
- Deputy: Ranjan Sarkar
- Preceded by: Himself (as Chairman of Board of Administrators)
- Succeeded by: TBD
- Constituency: Ward no.33

Cabinet Minister, Government of West Bengal
- In office 27 May 2016 – 2 May 2021
- Governor: Keshari Nath Tripathi; Jagdeep Dhankhar
- Ministry and Departments: Tourism
- Chief Minister: Mamata Banerjee
- Preceded by: Bratya Basu
- Succeeded by: Indranil Sen
- In office May 20, 2011 – May 19, 2016
- Governor: M. K. Narayanan; D. Y. Patil (additional charge); Keshari Nath Tripathi
- Chief Minister: Mamata Banerjee
- Ministry and Departments: North Bengal Development
- Preceded by: Ashok Bhattacharya
- Succeeded by: Rabindra Nath Ghosh

Member of the West Bengal Legislative Assembly
- In office 13 May 2011 – 2 May 2021
- Preceded by: Constituency established
- Succeeded by: Sikha Chatterjee
- Constituency: Dabgram-Phulbari

Chairman of Board of Administrators, Siliguri Municipal Corporation
- In office 7 May 2021 – 21 February 2022
- Preceded by: Ashok Bhattacharya (as mayor)
- Succeeded by: Himself (as mayor)

Personal details
- Born: 6 January 1957 (age 69) Siliguri, West Bengal, India
- Party: Trinamool Congress
- Spouse: Smt. Shukla Deb
- Children: Sreya Deb (Daughter); Saswata Deb (Son)
- Education: University of Calcutta, (LLB)
- Website: www.gautamdeb.org

Goutam Deb (born 6 January 1957) is an Indian politician. He was the Mayor of Siliguri Municipal Corporation in West Bengal, from 22 February 2022 to 19 June 2026. He was the Minister of Department of Tourism of West Bengal from 2016 to 2021. He also served as the Minister of the Department of North Bengal Development, a newly formed department in 2011 by Mamata Banerjee. He was a MLA from Dabgram-Phulbari assembly constituency two times. He is also serving as an observer of the Jalpaiguri District Trinamool Congress Committee.

== Early life and education ==
Goutam Deb did his schooling from Siliguri Boys' High School and thereafter he graduated from Siliguri College with B.A. followed by LL.B. Degree from Surendranath Law College under University of Calcutta.

He enrolled as an advocate at the Siliguri Bar in 1982. His father, Late Tejendra Binod Deb, was also a lawyer and Central Government Standing Counsel at the Calcutta High Court from 1971 to 1988.

He was Panel Counsel and Standing Counsel for the Indian Railways for Darjeeling, Jalpaiguri, Cooch Behar and West Dinajpur District Courts and Arbitrations from 1986 to 1995. His elder brother was the State Advocate General of Sikkim and also acted as Judge in Guwahati, Orissa and Sikkim High Court. He also acted as Acting Chief Justice of Hon’ble High Court of Sikkim for a while.

His elder brother, Late Anup Deb was Acting Chief Justice of Hon’ble High Court of Sikkim.

== Personal life ==
His wife is a social worker and elected as Councillor from Ward No. 17, Siliguri Municipal Corporation.

His son Saswata Deb studied in St. Xavier's Collegiate School. He is currently pursuing Computer Science and Engineering from VIT Bhopal. His daughter Dr. Sreya Deb obtained her M.B.B.S. degree from Calcutta National Medical College and Hospital and is currently pursuing her MD degree from St. Johns Medical College, Bengaluru.

== Political career ==
- 1975 - He entered politics as a member of Chhatra Parishad (CP) of Darjeeling District.
- 1978 – He was directly elected General Secretary of Chhatra Parishad at Siliguri College in North Bengal.
- 1978 to 1986 – He was the President of Chhatra Parishad of Darjeeling District.
- From 1988 up to 2015, four times, he remained Councillor of Siliguri Municipal Corporation (formerly Siliguri Municipality) except from 2004 to 2009 (when the seat was reserved)
- He was President of Youth Congress of Darjeeling District.
- He remained Leader of Opposition of Siliguri Municipal Corporation 2 times.
- Joined All India Trinamool Congress in 1998 (AITC).
- He has been working as President of Darjeeling District Trinamool Congress from 2004, both for plains and hills.
- He acted as Chairman of Trinamool Congress Core Committee of North Bengal comprising 8 districts.
- Member, National Working Committee, All India Trinamool Congress.

== Official positions held ==
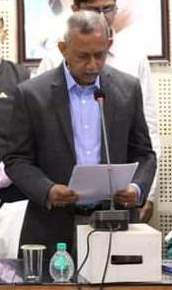
Goutam Deb is taking Oath as Mayor of Siliguri Municipal Corporation

- Former Mayor, Siliguri Municipal Corporation. (since 22-Feb-2022 till 19-Jun-2026)
- Chairman, Board of Administrators, Siliguri Municipal Corporation. (7-May-2021 to 27-Dec-2021)
- Minister-in-Charge, Tourism Department (27-May-2016 to 2 May 2021).
- Chairman, West Bengal Tourism Development Corporation Ltd. (21-March-2017 to 2019)
- Minister-in-Charge, North Bengal Development Department (20-May-2011 till 19-May-2016)
- Chairman, Siliguri Jalpaiguri Development Authority (from 15/03/2013 to 04/03/2016)
- Chairman of North Bengal State Transport Corporation (from 23/04/2012 to 10/06/2015).
- Chairman of Cooch Behar Development Fund Committee.
- Chairman of I.C.D.S. for Darjeeling and Jalpaiguri Districts.
- Chairman of Dinabandhu Mancha Advisory Committee. (Since 24 Aug. 2011)
- Chairman of Rogi Kalyan Samity of North Bengal Medical College and Hospital, North Bengal Dental College, Siliguri District Hospital, Jalpaiguri District Hospital and Darjeeling District Hospital (Eden Hospital).
- Chairman of Uttarbanga Unnayan Parshad formed for monitoring and reviewing the progress of development of all 8 districts of North Bengal. (17-Feb-2017 to 25-05-2019)
- Chairperson of Selection Committee for contractual employees to be engaged under Department of Health & Family Welfare, Govt. of West Bengal in Darjeeling SMP area.
- Chairperson, Rural ASHA & Block ASHA Facilitator of Darjeeling SMP area.
- President of Managing Committee of Siliguri Boys' High School.
- President of Managing Committee of Siliguri Girls' High School.
- Chairman of Tea Advisory Council. (Since 25-May-2017 till 2019)
- Member, Tea Advisory Council (Since 2019 to 2021)
- Present Chairman of Rogi Kalyan Samity of North Bengal Medical College and Hospital.
- Present Chairperson, West Bengal Minimum Wages Advisory Board from 22 November 2022.
