= Siliguri Municipal Corporation =

Local civic body in Siliguri, West Bengal, India

- Seal of the Siliguri Municipal Corporation

Type
- Type: Municipal Corporation
- Term limits: 5 years

History
- Founded: 1994; 32 years ago

Leadership
- Administrator: R. Vimala,IAS; Since 22 June 2026
- Mayor: vacant since 22 February 2022
- Deputy Mayor: vacant since February 2022
- Leader of the Opposition: vacant since 22 February 2022

Structure
- Seats: 63
- Political groups: "dissolved"

Elections
- Voting system: First past the post
- Last election: 12 February 2022
- Next election: November 2026

Meeting place
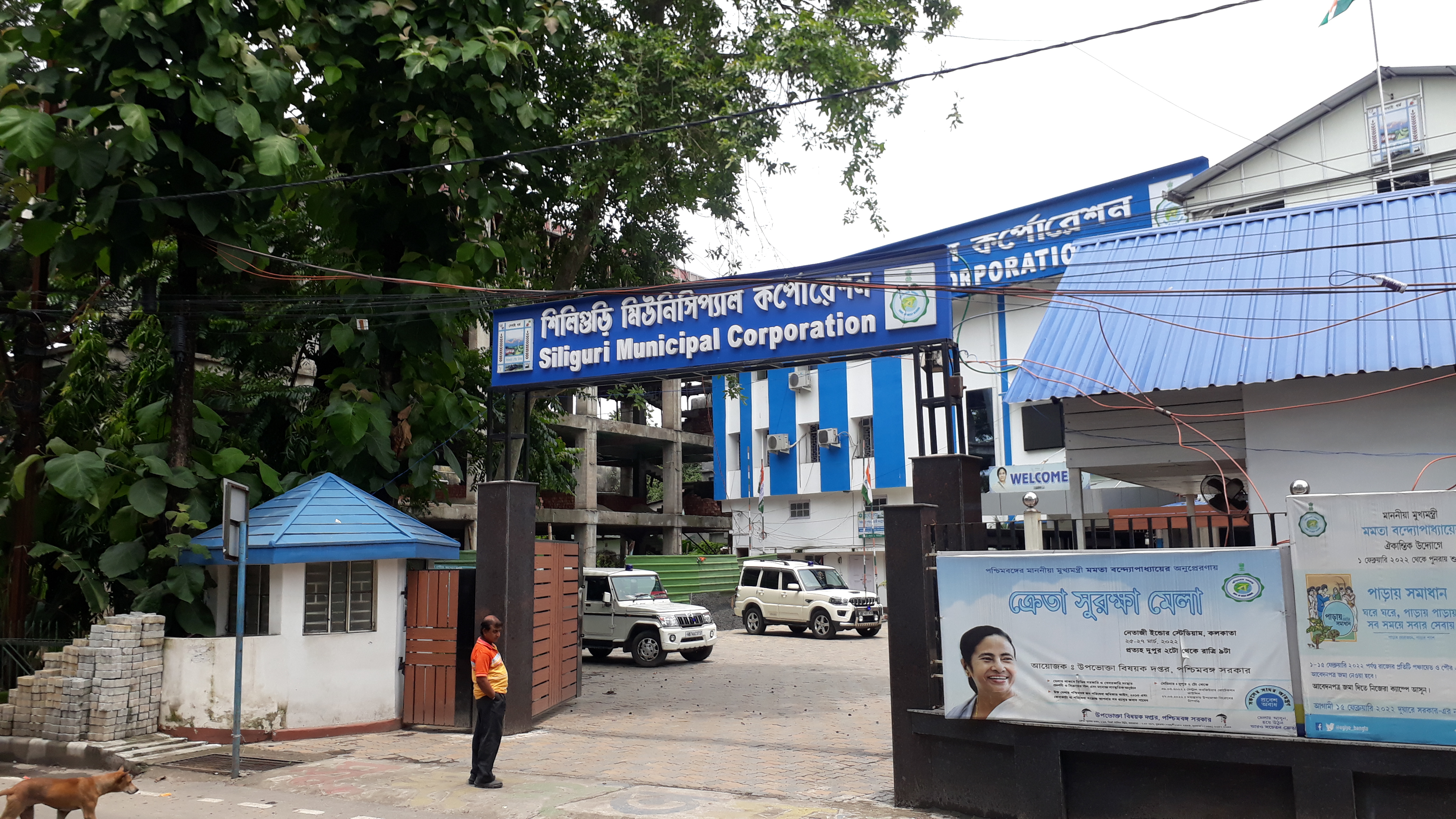
- Siliguri, West Bengal

Website
- www.siligurismc.in

Siliguri Municipal Corporation (SMC) was established in the year 1994 and has been responsible for the civic infrastructure and administration of the city of Siliguri.

== History ==
Siliguri Municipality was established in the year 1949. The first municipality office was set up in Hill Cart Road. It was a wooden construction. The first chairman of Siliguri Municipality was the then Sub Divisional Officer (SDO) Sachindra Mohan Guha. In the year 1994, Siliguri Municipality was awarded Corporation status.

== Area Coverage ==
Siliguri Municipal Corporation areas include both in Darjeeling and Jalpaiguri district. Out of 47 wards of SMC, 14 are in Jalpaiguri district. It administers an area of 41.90 km^{2} (16.18 sq mi).

== Departments ==
Name of the Department	Work / Activities
Education & Culture	Maintenance Charges of SC / ST Students of Darjeeling & Jalpaiguri District.; Mid-day-Meal Programme.; Felicitation programme for meritorious students of Madhyamik & Higher Secondary Exam.
Assessment & Mutation	Correction of Mutation; Assessment(Issue of new holding number); Vacant Land Land with building Property on Railway land/Vest land
Electricity	Maintenance and Development of Street Light and Project Work with in SMC Area.
Public Works Department	Repairing and widening of roads.; Construction of drains and roads.
Accounts	Carry out account activity of Corporation.; Handling of treasury.
General	All types of computer related works and maintaining all types of files and records..; Maintaining telephone/mobile register of Councillors and to dispatch Govt. letters to Mayor/Deputy Mayor/Commissioner /Secretary.
Birth and Death	Issue of Birth & Death Certificate; Maintain of Vital Statistics by Age, Sex & Religion.
Trade Licence	Issuance & Renewal of Certificate of Enlistment.; Advertisement related works.; Cycle Rickshaw & Cycle Rickshaw Van related works.
Building	Approval of the building plan.
U.P.E. Section	Slum Improvement.
Water Supply	Registration of water supply connection house and commercial establishment.
Estlablishment	Pension Matter and Staff salary.
Public Health and Hospital	Regular immunization program.; Health check-up.; Awareness program on vector-borne diseases like Malaria, Dengue and Encephalitis.; Prevent prenatal sex determination of foetus and to maintain the sex ratio between male & female.
Vehicle	Manages and control vehicle carrying water tank and garbage.
Market	Improvement of commercial establishment.
Conservancy Section	Collection and disposal of garbage.
Tax	Property tax collection.
Cash Section	Parking Fee and Site Planning Fee.
Law Section	To look after various day to day court cases of SMC and give legal opinion if needed.
Sports	Co-ordanating sports activities and events organised by SMC.
Guest House Booking Cell	Looks after bookings of guest house owned by SMC.

== Current members ==
Siliguri Municipal Corporation has a total of 47 members or councillors, who are directly elected after a term of 5 years. The council is led by the Mayor. The latest elections were held in 12 February 2022.The Mayor post is Vacant since 19 June 2026, following the resignation of seating mayor Goutam Deb. The current deputy mayor is Ranjan Sarkar of the Trinamool Congress.

Mayor: Goutam Deb
Deputy Mayor: Ranjan Sarkar
Ward No.	Name of Councillor	Party	Remarks
1	Sanjay Pathak	Trinamool Congress	
2	Gargi Chatterjee	Trinamool Congress	
3	Ram Bhajan Mahato	Trinamool Congress	
4	Vivek Singh	Bharatiya Janata Party	
5	Anita Mahato	Bharatiya Janata Party	
6	Alam Khan	Trinamool Congress	
7	Pintu Ghosh	Trinamool Congress	
8	Shalini Dalmia	Bharatiya Janata Party	
9	Amit Jain	Bharatiya Janata Party	Leader of Opposition
10	Kamal Agarwal	Trinamool Congress	
11	Manjushree Paul	Bharatiya Janata Party	
12	Basudeb Ghosh	Trinamool Congress	
13	Manik Dey	Trinamool Congress	
14	Srabani Dutta	Trinamool Congress	
15	Ranjan Sarkar	Trinamool Congress	Deputy Mayor
16	Sujoy Ghatak	Indian National Congress	
17	Mili Seal Sinha	Trinamool Congress	
18	Sanjay Sharma	Trinamool Congress	
19	Mousumi Hazra	Communist Party of India (Marxist)	
20	Abhaya Bose	Trinamool Congress	
21	Kuntal Roy	Trinamool Congress	
22	Dipto Karmakar	Communist Party of India (Marxist)	
23	Lakshmi Paul	Trinamool Congress	
24	Pratul Chakraborty	Trinamool Congress	Chairperson
25	Jayanta Saha	Trinamool Congress	
26	Sikta Dey Basu Ray	Trinamool Congress	
27	Prasanta Chakraborty	Trinamool Congress	
28	Samprita Das	Trinamool Congress	
29	Saradindu Chakraborty	Communist Party of India (Marxist)	
30	Sathi Das	Trinamool Congress	
31	Moumita Mondal	Trinamool Congress	
32	Tapas Chatterjee	Trinamool Congress	
33	Goutam Deb	Trinamool Congress	Former Mayor
34	Biman Chandra Tapadar	Trinamool Congress	
35	Sampa Nandi	Trinamool Congress	
36	Ranjan Sil Sharma	Trinamool Congress	
37	Alak Bhakta	Trinamool Congress	
38	Dulal Dutta	Trinamool Congress	
39	Pinki Saha	Trinamool Congress	
40	Rajesh Prasad Sah	Trinamool Congress	
41	Shivika Mittal	Trinamool Congress	
42	Shobha Subba	Trinamool Congress	
43	Sukhdeo Mahato	Trinamool Congress	
44	Pritikana Biswas	Trinamool Congress	
45	Munshi Nurul Islam	Communist Party of India (Marxist)	
46	Dilip Barman	Trinamool Congress	
47	Amar Ananda Das	Trinamool Congress	
