= Kalyanpur =

Kalyanpur, which means "City of Progress", may refer to:

== Places ==
=== India ===
- Kalyanpur village, Saran district, Bihar
- Kalyanpur, Goalpara, Assam
- Kalyanpur, Bhopal (census code 482425), a village in Huzur tehsil of Bhopal district, Madhya Pradesh, located near Sukhi Sewaniya railway station and Bhopal Bypass road
- Kalyanpur, Bhopal (census code 482497), a village in Huzur tehsil of Bhopal district, Madhya Pradesh, located near Bhopal-Sehore road
- Kalyanpur, Maharashtra
- Kalyanpur, Karnataka
- Kalyanpur, Puri, Odisha
- Kalyanpur, Rajasthan
- Kalyanpur, Baruipur, West Bengal
- Kalyanpur, Howrah, West Bengal
- Kalyanpur, Uttar Pradesh
- Jam-Kalyanpur, Gujarat, in Devbhumi Dwarka district
- Kalyanpur, Baleswar, Odisha

=== Bangladesh ===
- Kallyanpur, a neighbourhood of Dhaka
- A union of Chandpur Sadar Upazila

=== Nepal ===
- Kalyanpur, Bagmati, a village development committee in Nuwakot District in the Bagmati Zone
- Kalyanpur, Sagarmatha, headquarters of Khadak Municipality in Saptari District
- Kalyanpur Jabadi, a village development committee in Siraha District in the Sagarmatha Zone

== Electoral constituencies ==
- Kalyanpur, Purvi Champaran (Vidhan Sabha constituency), Bihar
- Kalyanpur, Samastipur (Vidhan Sabha constituency), Bihar
- Kalyanpur, Tripura Assembly constituency
- Kalyanpur, Kanpur (Vidhan Sabha constituency), Uttar Pradesh
- Kalyanpur, Howrah (Vidhan Sabha constituency), West Bengal

== See also ==
- Kalyanpura (disambiguation)
