= Hannan Mollah =

Indian politician (born 1946)

- হান্নান মোল্লা
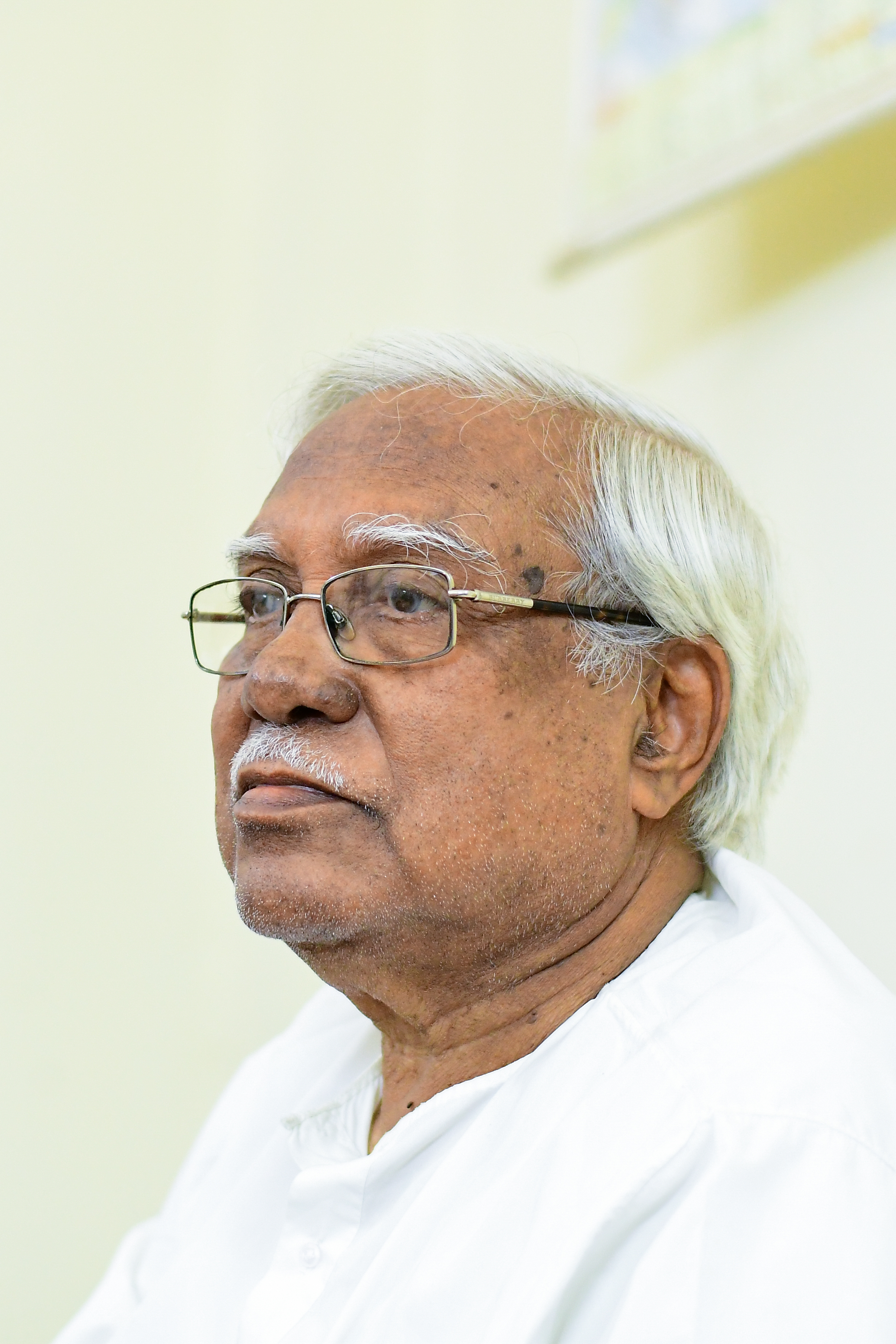
- Mollah in the 2022

Member of Polit Bureau, Communist Party of India (Marxist)
- In office 22 April 2018 – 10 April 2022
- Succeeded by: Ashok Dhawale

General Secretary of the All India Kisan Sabha
- In office 2012–2022
- Affiliation: Communist Party of India (Marxist)
- Succeeded by: Vijoo Krishnan

Member of Parliament, Lok Sabha
- In office 1980–2009
- Preceded by: Shyamaprasanna Bhattacharyya
- Succeeded by: Sultan Ahmed
- Constituency: Uluberia

Personal details
- Born: 3 January 1946 (age 80) Howrah, West Bengal, India
- Party: Communist Party of India (Marxist)
- Spouse: Maimoona (Abbas) Mollah
- Education: Presidency College, University of Calcutta

Hannan Mollah (born 3 January 1946) is an Indian communist, politician and a senior leader of the All India Kisan Sabha. He was the member of Indian parliament and elected to the Lok Sabha (lower house of Indian parliament) eight times from constituency of Uluberia in Howrah district of West Bengal. Mollah is a member of Politburo of the Communist Party of India (Marxist).

== Early life ==
Mollah was born on 3 January 1946 in Paschim Bauria, Howrah district of West Bengal to a working class family. His father Abdul Latif Mollah was a jute-mill worker, who died when he was very young and he was raised by his mother Jamila Khatoon in his maternal grandparents' house. He studied at Chengail Junior Madrasa. He was active in a local club, which led him to Left politics. He became a member of the undivided Communist Party of India (CPI) in 1962 when he was 16. After 1964, he joined CPI(M). He graduated with MA from Presidency College, University of Calcutta.

== Political life ==
Mollah was the general secretary of the Democratic Youth Federation of India (DYFI) from 1980 to 1991. He is a member of the CPI(M), serving as West Bengal State Committee Member from 1982, Central Committee Member from 1986 and politburo member of the party from the 21st Party Congress in April 2015. He currently serves as the General Secretary of the All India Kisan Sabha (AIKS) (from 2012) and as a Joint Secretary of the All India Agricultural Workers' Union.

He is a senior leader and a member of the working committee (highest body) of the All India Kisan Sangharsh Coordination Committee (AIKSCC) and played pivotal role in bringing together farmer unions from different parts of the country. He has been playing a leadership role in the farmers movement of India for 40 years. He is playing a senior leader in the ongoing Indian farmers' protest. He is also part of the delegation representing the farmer protesters in the meetings with the Indian Government.

In December 2020, a notice for arrest was issued by Delhi Police to Mollah, which Kisan Sabha claimed as "attempt for intimidation" in background of the Indian farmers' protest.

When asked by journalists regarding what happened in a nationally important farmers and government meeting on 8 December, Mollah made the notable reply - "Kuch nahi. Murgi baethi rahi, par anda nahi diya (Nothing really. The chicken sat but laid no eggs)." The Central Government and Home Minister Amit Shah was referred by chicken here. This quote gained popularity.

Under his secretaryship, AIKS has organized massive farmer movements - Kisan Long March in Maharashtra (2018), Kisan Movement in Rajasthan (2018), Kisan Mukti March to Delhi (2018) and all Indian farmers' protest (2020).

== Electoral career ==
Mollah has been a Member of Parliament from 1980 to 2009. He won the seat of Uluberia constituency eight times in a row but lost his seat to Sultan Ahmed of the Trinamool Congress in the 2009 election. He was a member from the 7th Lok Sabha to the 14th Lok Sabha. He has served as the Chairman of Wakf Board, West Bengal.

== Personal life ==
Mollah married AIDWA leader Maimoona Abbas in 1982. He has a daughter and a son.
