= Uluberia Lok Sabha constituency =

Lok Sabha constituency in West Bengal

Coordinates: 22°28′N 88°07′E

Uluberia WB-26
- Lok Sabha constituency
- Interactive Map Outlining Uluberia Lok Sabha Constituency

Constituency details
- Country: India
- Region: East India
- State: West Bengal
- Assembly constituencies: Uluberia Purba; Uluberia Uttar; Uluberia Dakshin; Shyampur; Bagnan; Amta; Udaynarayanpur
- Established: 1951
- Total electors: 15,78,032
- Reservation: None

Member of Parliament
- 18th Lok Sabha
- Incumbent Sajda Ahmed
- Party: MAITC
- Alliance: INDIA
- Elected year: 2024

Uluberia Lok Sabha constituency is one of the 543 parliamentary constituencies in India. The constituency centres on Uluberia in West Bengal. All the seven assembly segments of No. 26 Uluberia Lok Sabha constituency are in Howrah district.

== Assembly segments ==
Parliamentary constituencies in West Bengal - 1. Cooch Behar, 2. Alipurduars, 3. Jalpaiguri, 4. Darjeeling, 5. Raiganj, 6. Balurghat, 7. Maldaha Uttar, 8. Maldaha Dakshin, 9. Jangipur, 10. Baharampur, 11. Murshidabad, 12. Krishnanagar, 13. Ranaghat, 14. Bangaon, 15. Barrackpore, 16. Dum Dum, 17. Barasat, 18. Basirhat, 19. Jaynagar, 20. Mathurapur, 21. Diamond Harbour, 22. Jadavpur, 23. Kolkata Dakshin, 24. Kolkata Uttar, 25. Howrah, 26. Uluberia, 27. Serampore, 28. Hooghly, 29. Arambagh, 30. Tamluk, 31, Kanthi, 32. Ghatal, 33. Jhargram, 34. Medinipur, 35. Purulia, 36. Bankura, 37. Bishnupur, 38. Bardhaman Purba, 39. Bardhaman Durgapur, 40. Asansol, 41. Bolpur, 42. Birbhum

As per order of the Delimitation Commission issued in 2006 in respect of the delimitation of constituencies in the West Bengal, parliamentary constituency no. 26 Uluberia is composed of the following segments:

#	Name	District	Member	Party	2024 Lead
176	Uluberia Purba	Howrah	Ritabrata Banerjee	AITC	AITC
177	Uluberia Uttar (SC)	Howrah	Chiran Bera	BJP	AITC
178	Uluberia Dakshin	Howrah	Pulak Roy	AITC	AITC
179	Shyampur	Howrah	Hiran Chatterjee	BJP	AITC
180	Bagnan	Howrah	Arunava Sen	AITC	AITC
181	Amta	Howrah	Amit Samanta	BJP	AITC
182	Udaynarayanpur	Howrah	Samir Kumar Panja	AITC	AITC

== Members of Parliament ==
Year	Member	Party
1952	Satyaban Roy	Indian National Congress
1957	Aurobindo Ghosal	Marxist Forward Bloc
1962	Purnendu Khan	Indian National Congress
1967	J. K. Mondal	Indian National Congress
1971	Shyamaprasanna Bhattacharyya	Communist Party of India (Marxist)
1977	Shyamaprasanna Bhattacharyya	Communist Party of India (Marxist)
1980	Hannan Mollah	Communist Party of India (Marxist)
1984	Hannan Mollah	Communist Party of India (Marxist)
1989	Hannan Mollah	Communist Party of India (Marxist)
1991	Hannan Mollah	Communist Party of India (Marxist)
1996	Hannan Mollah	Communist Party of India (Marxist)
1998	Hannan Mollah	Communist Party of India (Marxist)
1999	Hannan Mollah	Communist Party of India (Marxist)
2004	Hannan Mollah	Communist Party of India (Marxist)
2009	Sultan Ahmed	Trinamool Congress
2014	Sultan Ahmed	Trinamool Congress
2018^	Sajda Ahmed	Trinamool Congress
2019	Sajda Ahmed	Trinamool Congress
2024	Sajda Ahmed	Trinamool Congress

== Election results ==
=== General election 2024 ===
2024 Indian general election: Uluberia
Party	Candidate	Votes	%	±%
AITC	Sajda Ahmed	724,622	52.10	▼0.90
BJP	Arun Uday Pal Chaudhary	505,949	36.30	▼0.20
INC	Richik Bandyopadhyay	78,589	5.65	▲3.55
NOTA	None of the above	11,318	0.81	▲0.09
Majority		218,673	15.80	
Turnout		1,390,794		
AITC hold		Swing		

=== General election 2019 ===
2019 Indian general elections: Uluberia
Party	Candidate	Votes	%	±%
AITC	Sajda Ahmed	694,945	53.00	▼8.00
BJP	Joy Banerjee	479,586	36.58	▲13.25
CPI(M)	Maksuda Khatun	81,314	6.20	▼4.84
INC	Shoma Ranishri Roy	27,568	2.10	▲0.26
Independent	Durgadas Hajra	6,770	0.52	▲0.52
NOTA	None of the above	9,399	0.72	▲0.01
Majority		215,359		
Turnout		1,311,120	81.18	
AITC hold		Swing	▼8.00	

=== By election 2018 ===
Bye-election, 2018: Uluberia
Party	Candidate	Votes	%	±%
AITC	Sajda Ahmed	7,67,556	61.00	+12.88
BJP	Anupam Mallik	2,93,046	23.29	+11.73
CPI(M)	Sabiruddin Molla	1,38,892	11.04	−20.11
INC	S. K. Maddassar Hossain Warsi	23,109	1.84	−3.87
Independent	Tapas Mondal	7,682	0.61	
Indian Unity Centre	Simal Saren	5,383	0.43	
Independent	Kamal Krishna Mallick	4,566	0.36	
Independent	Sanjib Karmakar	3,684	0.29	
Independent	Amal Barman	2,560	0.20	
NOTA	None of the Above	11,757	0.93	
Majority		4,74,510	37.71	
Turnout		12,58,303	79.74	−2.13
AITC hold		Swing		

=== General election 2014 ===
2014 Indian general elections: Uluberia
Party	Candidate	Votes	%	±%
AITC	Sultan Ahmed	5,70,785	48.12	−2.8
CPI(M)	Sabiruddin Molla	3,69,563	31.15	−9.97
BJP	Ranjit Kishore Mahanty	1,37,137	11.56	+7.36
INC	Asit Mitra	67,826	5.71	
Indian Unity Centre	Abul Quasem	6,607	0.55	
AIUDF	Hasan Nawaj	5,709	0.48	−0.63
Independent	Dilip Kumar Hait	3,947	0.33	
BSP	Rekha Das	3,918	0.33	−0.43
Independent	Susanta Kumar Dalui	2,990	0.25	
SUCI(C)	Minati Sarkar	2,902	0.24	
Independent	Ramesh Dhara	2,529	0.21	
Independent	Ashis Kumar Das	2,437	0.20	
BMP	Sujata Dutta	1,400	0.11	
Majority		2,01,222	16.97	
Turnout		11,86,027	81.87	
AITC hold		Swing		

=== General election 2009 ===
General Election, 2009: Uluberia
Party	Candidate	Votes	%	±%
AITC	Sultan Ahmed	5,14,193	50.92	
CPI(M)	Hannan Mollah	4,15,257	41.12	
BJP	Rahul Chakrabarty	42,434	4.20	
AUDF	Kazi Nabab	11,238	1.11	
BSP	Narendra Nath Mandal	7,714	0.76	
Independent	Sekh Aorangjeb	6,475	0.64	
Independent	Swapan Das	6,005	0.59	
RDMP	Rabin Dolui	3,362	0.33	
Independent	Ashish Das	3,141	0.31	
Majority		98,936	9.80	
Turnout		10,09,819	80.68	
AITC gain from CPI(M)		Swing		

=== General election 2004 ===
General Election, 2004: Uluberia
Party	Candidate	Votes	%	±%
CPI(M)	Hannan Mollah	424,749		
AITC	Rajib Banerjee	272,634		
INC	Kazi Abdul Rajjak	124,326		
IJP	Snehanshu Maity	8,785		
RJP	Dilip Kumar Palit	6,687		
BSP	Sandhya Mandal	6,677		
LJP	Bharat Chandra Manna	4,030		
Independent	Baidyanath Choudhury	3,658		
Majority		152,115		
Turnout		1,009,820	80.68	
CPI(M) hold		Swing		

=== General elections 1951-2004 ===
Most of the contests were multi-cornered. However, only winners and runners-up are mentioned below:

Year	Winner		Runner-up	
	Candidate	Party	Candidate	Party
1951	Satyaban Roy	Indian National Congress	Aurobindo Ghosal	Marxist Forward Bloc
1957	Aurobindo Ghosal	Marxist Forward Bloc	Kalobaran Ghosh	Indian National Congress
1962	Purnendu Khan	Indian National Congress	Aurobindo Ghosal	All India Forward Bloc
1967	J.K.Mondal	Indian National Congress	Shyamaprasanna Bhattacharya	Communist Party of India (Marxist)
1971	Shyamaprasanna Bhattacharya	Communist Party of India (Marxist)	Murari Mohan Manna	Indian National Congress
1977	Shyamaprasanna Bhattacharya	Communist Party of India (Marxist)	Nirmalendu Bhattacharjee	Indian National Congress
1980	Hannan Mollah	Communist Party of India (Marxist)	Ardhendu Hazra	Indian National Congress (I)
1984	Hannan Mollah	Communist Party of India (Marxist)	Anwar Ali Sheikh	Indian National Congress
1989	Hannan Mollah	Communist Party of India (Marxist)	Anwar Ali Sheikh	Indian National Congress
1991	Hannan Mollah	Communist Party of India (Marxist)	Minati Adhikari	Indian National Congress
1996	Hannan Mollah	Communist Party of India (Marxist)	Minati Adhikari	Indian National Congress
1998	Hannan Mollah	Communist Party of India (Marxist)	Saradindu Biswas	Trinamool Congress
1999	Hannan Mollah	Communist Party of India (Marxist)	Sudipta Roy	All India Trinamool Congress
2004	Hannan Mollah	Communist Party of India (Marxist)	Rajib Bannerjee	All India Trinamool Congress

== See also ==
- List of constituencies of the Lok Sabha
