= Kalyanpura =

Kalyanpura may refer to:

- Kalyanpura, Bhopal, a village in Madhya Pradesh, India
- Kalyanpura, Udupi, a village in Karnataka, India
- Kalyanpura (Ahmedabad), a neighbourhood in Ahmedabad, India

== See also ==
- Kalyanpur (disambiguation)
