= Kalyanpur, Bhopal (census code 482497) =

Kalyanpur
- village
- Location within Madhya Pradesh Location within India
- Coordinates: 23.162311°N 77.245063°E
- Country: India
- State: Madhya Pradesh
- District: Bhopal
- Tehsil: Huzur

Population (2011)
  - Total: 138
- Time zone: UTC+5:30 (IST)
- ISO 3166 code: MP-IN
- 2011 census code: 482497

Kalyanpur is a village in the Bhopal district of Madhya Pradesh, India. It is located in the Huzur tehsil and the Phanda block.

It is located near Moondla, Teela Khedi and Dehriya Kalan, not far from the Sehore-Bhopal road.

== Demographics ==
According to the 2011 census of India, Kalyanpur has 19 households. The effective literacy rate (i.e. the literacy rate of population excluding children aged 6 and below) is 66.95%.

Demographics (2011 Census)
	Total	Male	Female
Population	138	66	72
Children aged below 6 years	20	9	11
Scheduled caste	0	0	0
Scheduled tribe	5	2	3
Literates	79	51	28
Workers (all)	66	33	33
Main workers (total)	63	32	31
Main workers: Cultivators	60	31	29
Main workers: Agricultural labourers	2	1	1
Main workers: Household industry workers	1	0	1
Main workers: Other	0	0	0
Marginal workers (total)	3	1	2
Marginal workers: Cultivators	2	1	1
Marginal workers: Agricultural labourers	0	0	0
Marginal workers: Household industry workers	0	0	0
Marginal workers: Others	1	0	1
Non-workers	72	33	39
