= Kalyanpur Assembly constituency =

Kalyanpur Assembly constituency may refer to these electoral constituencies in India:

- Kalyanpur, Samastipur Assembly constituency in Bihar
- Kalyanpur, Purvi Champaran Assembly constituency in Bihar
- Kalyanpur, Uttar Pradesh Assembly constituency
- Kalyanpur, West Bengal Assembly constituency
- Kalyanpur–Pramodenagar Assembly constituency in Tripura
- Kalyanpur, Tripura Assembly constituency (defunct)

== See also ==
- Kalyanpur (disambiguation)
