= Sukanta Kumar Paul =

Indian politician

Member of West Bengal Legislative Assembly
- In office 2 May 2021 – 5 May, 2026
- Preceded by: Asit Mitra
- Succeeded by: Amit Samanta
- Constituency: Amta

Personal details
- Born: 12 January Amta
- Party: AITC
- Profession: Politician

Sukanta Kumar Paul is an Indian politician. He is a youth leader. He is a member of All India Trinamool Congress. He was elected as MLA of West Bengal Legislative Assembly in 2021 assembly election from Amta Constituency. He lost his seat to Amit Samanta in 2026.
