= Kanadi village (Chandgad taluka) =

Village in Maharashtra

Kanadi-Padatewadi
- Village
- Country: India

Population
  - Total: 924

Kanadi-Padatewadi is a village on the bank of the Ghatprabha River in Chandgad Taluka, India. It belongs to the Pune division. Kanadi is 10 kilometres (6.2 mi) away from the city of Chandgad. The village's population was 924 in 2020, up from 865 in the census of 2011.

Kanadi is home to farmers and the main crops are rice, sugarcane, groundnut, and maize. There is also a primary school in Kanadi, named Kumar Vidya Mandir, Kanadi.

== Sacred sites ==
Kanadi is home to several Hindu temples including God Shree Ramling Prasanna, Goddess Shree Bhaveshvari, Saibaba Mandir-Padatewadi, and the Goddess Shree Margubai temples are all within the villages. Janmashtami, a holiday celebrating the birth of Krishna, is celebrated every year in Kanadi, while Devi Margubai yatra is celebrated every two years.
