= Purnendu Khan =

Indian politician

Member of Parliament, Lok Sabha
- In office 1962–1967
- Preceded by: Aurobindo Ghosal
- Succeeded by: J. K. Mondal
- Constituency: Uluberia, West Bengal

Personal details
- Born: 21 April 1911 Chakur, Howrah district, Bengal Presidency, British India
- Party: Indian National Congress
- Spouse: Ashalata Khan

Purnendu Narayan Khan (born 21 April 1911, date of death unknown) was an Indian politician. He was elected to the Lok Sabha, the lower house of the Parliament of India from the Uluberia in West Bengal as a member of the Indian National Congress.
