= Patne =

Village in Maharashtra

Coordinates: 15°52′N 74°13′E

- Village
- Interactive map of Patne
- Country: India
- State: Maharashtra
- District: Kolhapur

Languages
  - Official: Marathi
- Time zone: UTC+5:30 (IST)
- Nearest city: Chandgad

Patne is a village in Kolhapur District in the northern part of Maharashtra, India.

== History ==
There are evidences showing Stone Age habitation in Patne including ostrich eggshell beads, chalcedony and jasper tools. In medieval times, the village was held by the Nikhumbas as a feudatory of the Yadavas. Inscriptions of these people have been found at the ruins of old Patne which lies 1.5 km south of Patne village.

== Population ==
In 2011, there were 1099 people living in Patne in 254 families. Some families are of Chardo origin.

== Location ==
Patne is situated on the left bank of the Ad Nala River, a tributary of the Tapti River. The nearest large town is Belgaum to the East. It rests 410 metres (1,350 ft) above sea level on a wide fluvial plain. To the south are the Ajanti Hills

== Language ==
Konkani is spoken by Goan migrants to Patne.

== Sites ==
- Pithalkora caves and Stone Age archeological site.
- Kedarkund Falls, waterfalls on the Ad Nala river.
