= Vijoo Krishnan =

Indian social activist (born 1974)

Dr. Vijoo Krishnan
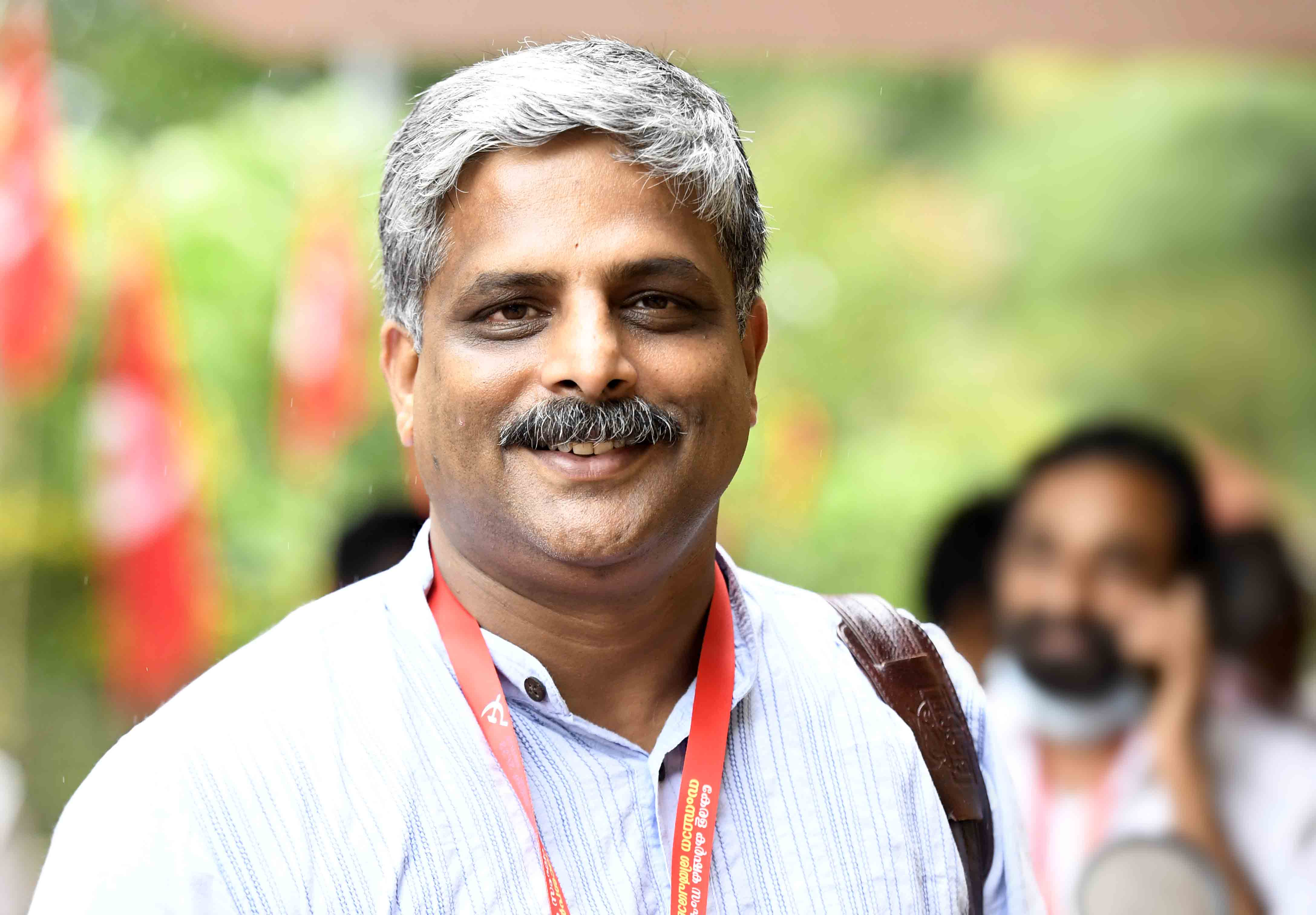

General Secretary of the All India Kisan Sabha
- Incumbent
- Assumed office 16 December 2022
- Affiliation: Communist Party of India (Marxist)
- Preceded by: Hannan Mollah

Personal details
- Born: 20 February 1974 (age 52) Karivellur, India
- Party: Communist Party of India (Marxist)
- Education: Doctor of Philosophy
- Alma mater: St Joseph's College, Bangalore; Jawaharlal Nehru University

Dr. Vijoo Krishnan is an Indian peasant leader, writer on agrarian Issues and General Secretary of the All India Kisan Sabha. He is a politburo member of Communist Party of India (Marxist). He was also part of the six-member central secretariat of CPI(M) from 2022 to 2025. He is one of the key organiser of Bhoomi Adhikar Andolan (Movement for Land Rights).

== Life ==
Vijoo Krishnan was born to Dr P Krishnan and Shyamala in Karivellur, the land posturing the legacy of peasant movements in Kerala. He spend much of his childhood in Bangalore and got enrolled at St. Joseph's Indian High School. He did his graduation in Political Science from St Joseph's College, Bangalore and joined School of International Studies, JNU for his master's degree. He completed both his MPhil and PhD from Jawaharlal Nehru University (JNU) with a specialisation in Indian Agrarian Economy.

== Student politics ==
Vijoo Krishnan's first involvement in protest politics came in 1992, against the Babri Masjid demolition while he was a student at St Joseph's College of Arts & Science, Bangalore. On 25 August 1996, Krishnan enrolled himself as a member of Students' Federation of India at Jawaharlal Nehru University, New Delhi. In 1996-97, his active involvement in student politics through left politics made him the Vice President of Jawaharlal Nehru University Students Union (JNUSU), a seat which was lost to Govind Chandra Mishra from ABVP in the previous year. In 1996-97 JNUSU election Akhil Bharatiya Vidyarthi Parishad won three major central panel seats including vice president, general secretary and joint secretary. In 1997-98, Battilal Bairwa (President), Vijoo Krishnan (Vice President) and Naseer Hussain (Joint Secretary) from SFI won the JNUSU elections, and Jatin Mohanty from ABVP won as General Secretary. A left alliance of SFI-AISF won the JNUSU elections again in 1998–99 with Krishnan as the president. After amending the JNUSU constitution, during his tenure, the first GSCASH (Gender Sensitisation Committee Against Sexual Harassment) was formed. This model was later adopted by several universities in India. His tenure also included a hostel movement that led the university administration to rent an off-campus hotel and arrange transport for affected students, and the launch of on-campus entrance-exam training for students from marginalised backgrounds. By 2004, he was elected as both the State President of Delhi and a member of Central Executive Committee of Students' Federation of India (SFI).

== Peasant leader and social activist ==
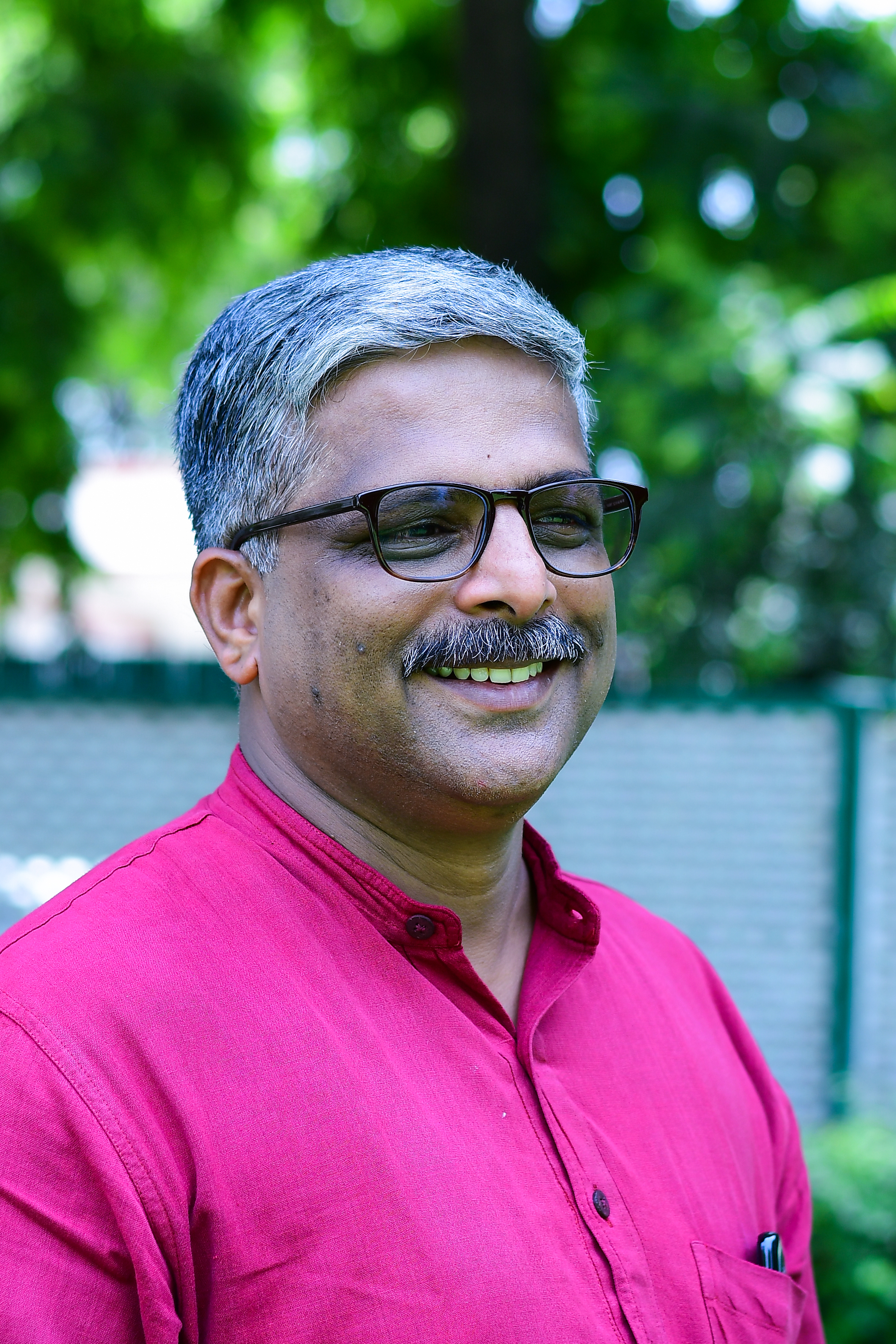
Vijoo Krishnan in 2022

After earning his PhD, Vijoo Krishnan joined St Joseph's College, Bangalore and there he became the Head of the post-graduate department of political science. After Gujarat 2002 riot, Vijoo Krishnan along with Dr. Kamal Mitra Chenoy, Vishnu Nagar and Prasenjit Bose headed the two day fact finding team of SAHMAT (Safdar Hashmi Memorial Trust) in Ahmedabad. This committee claimed that 2002 Gujarat riots is not a communal riot but a pogrom. He was the one to expose the religious profiling of a Muslim boy named Sajid by the Bangalore police in connections with the 25 July 2016 serial bomb blast in the city. From 2009 onwards, Vijoo Krishnan is working close with agrarian issues and other matters concerning peasants. He is a frequent contributor to The Frontline Magazine, The Hindu on Agrarian issues. Krishnan played a crucial role in organising the peasant long march in Maharashtra, massive protests in Rajasthan, Karnataka, Madhya Pradesh, Uttar Pradesh and Delhi. The Mazdoor Kisan Sangharsh rally conducted in Delhi and Delhi Chalo March (29-30 November 2018) was two major important events. He warned the Maharashtra government of bigger peasant movements if they roll back from the promises after Kisan Long March. The Kisan march in Delhi witnessed a participation of more than one lakh farmers. Around 300 districts in India witnessed the intensification of struggles led by All India Kisan Sabha in recent past. The farmers march has given Vijoo Krishnan a celebrity status and a lot of appreciations from Bollywood (including Sanjay Khan). He is also involved with the activities of the People's Resistance Forum against Free Trade Agreements. He along with Medha Patkar demanded amendments in Land Acquisition Act 2013.

He was one of the key organiser of Bhoomi Adhikar Andolan (Movement for Land Rights), a gathering of more than 500 social activists and 65 organisations at Sabarmati, Ahmedabad from 16–17 July 2016 demanding the withdrawal of 100 per cent FDI from agricultural sector. Vijoo and his organisation was involved in the protest demonstrations against the banning of cattle trade for slaughter purpose in 2017 at Delhi. His leadership in Bhoomi Adhikar Andolan lead to the activities of fact finding team in Rajasthan against the lynching of Muslims. He has taken strong position against the murders of cow vigilantes in Rajasthan. He accused the police in Alwar and Bharatpur districts of Rajasthan to be working hand in hand with the vigilante group. He pointed out the negative correlation between farmer economy and cow vigilantism.

Vijoo Krishnan gave leadership for the nationwide protest day on 16 June 2017 by farmers which demanded the loan waiver for peasants and reversal of fund cuts in MNREGA. He is a strong advocate against the Forest Rights Act (Amendment) Bill, 2019 and argues that the provisions of bill makes corporate land grab of adivasi land more easy. Nationwide protest demonstration was held against the bill in the month of July 2019 with the leadership of Bhoomi Adhikar Andolan, Adivasi Adhikar Rashtriya Manch and All India Agricultural Workers’ Union. Vijoo played a crucial role in organizing farmers protest against the government acquisition of 1000 acres of agricultural land for Mumbai-Ahmedabad high speed rail corridor(MAHSRC) project. He and his organisation despite the brutal police action played a crucial role in organising protest demonstrations against the Chennai-Salem Green Corridor in Tamil Nadu. He was in the forefront to demand to amend the central governments manual for Drought Management (2016) in service of farmers and bring up the issue of under reporting of farmers suicides in India. He accused the Modi government for being anti-farmer and pointed out that, of the more than 3600 farmer suicides which happened in India from 2014 and 2017, 70% of the suicides belonged to BJP-ruled and its partner States. His solution for combating farmers suicides were a) low interest farm credits to farmers and b) price control of input costs. He organised farmers march to Indian Parliament against the increasing farmers suicide. He emphasised the importance of solidarity based not just for minimum support prices and loan waivers but also for achieving land rights, ownership of land and forest rights. He accused the ultranationalist political campaign for the re-election of Narendra Modi government despite its anti-farmers policies.

Vijoo Krishnan has been vocal for the implementation of MS Swaminathan Committee recommendations for bettering the conditions of farmers. He has been the leadership for organising the protest action against farmers suicides. He along with P Sainath has constantly demanded fair prices for agricultural goods, protection and encouragement of sustainable farming activities. He demanded the extension of PM-Kisan pension to old farmers and tenants as well. He was the first one to expose the corruption in Pradhan Mantri Fasal Bima Yojana (PMFBY) and its bitter implications for tenant farmers. In PMFBY, he strongly opposed the heavy premiums collected by the insurance companies and least return to farmers as compensation. Vijoo Krishnan strongly opposed the involvement of multinationals in crop insurance schemes. Vijoo Krishnan has played a very crucial role in mainstreaming the farmers issue in India. He was invited to India Today Conclave 2019 and he strongly argued for the case of reversing the neoliberal economic policies since 1991 for combating agrarian crisis. He is a frequent face of Indian Peasantry in International Media and has been featured in Al Jazeera, Brasil de Fato, Telesur English, Asia Times, Gulf News, Express etc. He was recognised by Memories of Change exhibition for his contributions in Agrarian Mobilisations. He was one of the contributor to the India Disasters Report II published by Oxford University Press in 2013. He called for the importance of Peasant movement rooted in production level in order to ensure the security of employment, food security and inverse the insecurity of land. He along with Utsa Patnaik and Harsh Mander was the speakers on Agrarian Distress at the Idea of India conclave conducted to evaluate the first year of Modi Government. Just before the 2019 Lok Sabha election, Vijoo and his team organised a huge peasant rally in Wayanad to counter the candidature of Rahul Gandhi. He was also key person behind experimenting Bahujan Left Front (BLF) in Telangana to oppose the pro- neoliberal economic policies of Telangana Rashtra Samithi government.

He was one of the signatory to the Supreme Court which demanded the reconsideration of the verdict on Justice Loya's death. He was also a signatory against the attempt of Uttar Pradesh Government charging FIR against The Wire and its editor Siddharth Varadarajan. He translated Huchangi Prasad's poem against caste discrimination from Kannada to English. Prasad, a young Dalit writer was earlier attacked by right-wing goons for his book Odala Kicchu (The Fire Within).

Vijoo played instrumental role in the peasant agitations against the Farmers’ Produce Trade and Commerce (Promotion and Facilitation) Bill, 2020, the Farmers (Empowerment and Protection) Agreement of Price Assurance and Farm Services Bill, 2020 and the Essential Commodities (Amendment) Bill, 2020. He called the three farm laws as anti-famers and perpetuating "corporate profiteering" and "corporate loot" in agrarian sector. The withdrawal of farm laws, indicated the victory of farmer's unity, as per Vijoo.

He was elected as the general secretary of AIKS on 16 December 2022. He is the youngest general secretary in the past 60 years of AIKS.
