= Satyaban Roy =

Indian politician

Member of Parliament, Lok Sabha
- In office 1952–1957
- Succeeded by: Aurobindo Ghosal
- Constituency: Uluberia, West Bengal

Personal details
- Born: 1898 Chitrasenpur, Howrah, Bengal Presidency, British India
- Party: Indian National Congress
- Spouse: Amiyabala Roy

Satyaban Roy was an Indian politician. He was elected to the Lok Sabha, the lower house of the Parliament of India from Uluberia in West Bengal as a member of the Indian National Congress.
