= Barindra Nath Koley =

Indian politician

Member of West Bengal Legislative Assembly
- In office 1977–1996
- Preceded by: Afiabuddin Mondal
- Succeeded by: Pratyush Mukherjee
- Constituency: Amta

Personal details
- Born: 1 December 1931 Khoshalpur, Amta
- Died: 11 April 2018 (aged 86) SSKM Hospital, Kolkata, West Bengal
- Party: Communist Party of India (Marxist)
- Spouse: Santi Koley
- Relatives: Suchismita Koley (Jana) (Elder Daughter); Sangita Koley (Das) (Younger Daughter)
- Profession: Politician; Teacher

Barindra Nath Koley was an Indian politician. He was a peasant leader and a member of Communist Party of India (Marxist). He represented Amta Assembly constituency from 1977 to 1996. He was a teacher of history in Baneswarpur Ramchandrapur Anulia United High School in Amta I.

== Electoral performance ==
=== 1972 ===
West Bengal Assembly election, 1972 : Amta
Party	Candidate	Votes	%	±%
INC	Afiabuddin Mondal	26,322	50.19	+26.83
CPI(M)	Barindra Nath Koley	24,710	47.12	−14.02
INC(O)	Nirmal Kumar Roy	1,411	2.69	−1.64
Majority		1,616	3.07	–34.71
INC gain from CPI(M)		Swing		

=== 1977 ===
West Bengal Assembly election, 1977 : Amta
Party	Candidate	Votes	%	±%
CPI(M)	Barindra Nath Koley	33,747	66.72	+19.6
INC	Aftabuddin Mondal	10,527	20.81	−29.38
JP	Bhabani Charan Pramanik	5,071	10.03	New
Majority		23,220	45.91	+42.41
CPI(M) gain from INC		Swing		

=== 1982 ===
West Bengal Assembly election, 1982 : Amta
Party	Candidate	Votes	%	±%
CPI(M)	Barindra Nath Koley	42,464	56.95	−9.77
INC	Sk. Ainuddin	30,423	40.8	+19.99
JP	Nirod Baran Ghosh	959	1.29	−8.74
Majority		12,041	16.15	−29.76
CPI(M) hold		Swing		

=== 1987 ===
West Bengal Assembly election, 1987 : Amta
Party	Candidate	Votes	%	±%
CPI(M)	Barindra Nath Koley	50,751	55.13	−1.82
INC	Aftabuddin Mondal	39,804	43.23	+2.43
LKD	Sk. Abdul Rashid	441	1.29	New
Majority		10,947	11.9	−4.25
CPI(M) hold		Swing		

=== 1991 ===
West Bengal Assembly election, 1991 : Amta
Party	Candidate	Votes	%	±%
CPI(M)	Barindra Nath Koley	56,548	53.92	−1.21
INC	Aftabuddin Mondal	43,449	41.43	−1.8
BJP	Pasupati Hal	4,548	4.34	New
AMB	Susanta Chongdar	325	0.31	New
Majority		13,099	12.49	+0.59
CPI(M) hold		Swing		
