= Amta Assembly constituency =

West Bengal Legislative Assembly constituency

Amta
- Constituency No. 181 for the West Bengal Legislative Assembly
- Interactive Map Outlining Amta Assembly Constituency

Constituency details
- Country: India
- Region: East India
- State: West Bengal
- District: Howrah
- Lok Sabha constituency: Uluberia
- Established: 1951
- Total electors: 206,691
- Reservation: None

Member of Legislative Assembly
- 18th West Bengal Legislative Assembly
- Incumbent Amit Samanta
- Party: BJP
- Alliance: NDA
- Elected year: 2026

Amta Assembly constituency is an assembly constituency in Howrah district in the Indian state of West Bengal.

== Overview ==
As per orders of the Delimitation Commission, No. 181, Amta Assembly constituency is composed of the following: Amta II community development block, and Bainan, Baksirhat, Kalyanpur and Sabsit gram panchayats of Bagnan I community development block. Amta Assembly constituency is part of No. 26 Uluberia (Lok Sabha constituency).

== Members of the Legislative Assembly ==
Year	Name	Party
1951	Arabinda Roy (Amta South)	Indian National Congress
1951	Tarapada Pramanick (Amta Central)	Indian National Congress
1951	Alamohan Das (Amta North)	Independent politician
1957	Gobinda Charan Maji (Amta East)	Praja Socialist Party
1957	Arabinda Roy (Amta West)	Indian National Congress
1962	Tarapada Pramanick	Indian National Congress
1967	Nitai Bhandari	Communist Party of India (Marxist)
1969	Nitai Bhandari	Communist Party of India (Marxist)
1971	Bapindra Koley	Communist Party of India (Marxist)
1972	Afiabuddin Mondal	Indian National Congress
1977	Barindra Nath Koley	Communist Party of India (Marxist)
1982	Barindra Nath Koley	Communist Party of India (Marxist)
1987	Barindra Nath Koley	Communist Party of India (Marxist)
1991	Barindra Nath Koley	Communist Party of India (Marxist)
1996	Pratyush Mukherjee	Communist Party of India (Marxist)
2001	Pratyush Mukherjee	Communist Party of India (Marxist)
2006	Pratyush Mukherjee	Communist Party of India (Marxist)
2011	Asit Mitra	Indian National Congress
2016	Asit Mitra	Indian National Congress
2021	Sukanta Kumar Paul	Trinamool Congress
2026	Amit Samanta	Bharatiya Janata Party

== Election results ==
=== 2026 ===
2026 West Bengal Legislative Assembly election: Amta
Party	Candidate	Votes	%	±%
BJP	Amit Samanta	104,649	44.16	+7.65
AITC	Sukanta Kumar Paul	100,195	42.28	−6.78
CPI(M)	Joshimuddin Mallick	23,193	9.79	
INC	Tapan Das	2,350	0.99	−11.03
NOTA	None of the above	1,855	0.78	+0.16
Majority		4,454	1.88	−10.67
Turnout		237,001	92.18	+12.45
BJP gain from AITC		Swing		

=== 2021 ===
In the 2021 election, Sukanta Kumar Paul of Trinamool Congress defeated his nearest rival Debtanu Bhattacharjee of Bharatiya Janata Party.

2021 West Bengal Legislative Assembly election: Amta constituency
Party	Candidate	Votes	%	±%
AITC	Sukanta Kumar Paul	102,445	49.06	
BJP	Debtanu Bhattacharjee	76,240	36.51	+30.68
INC	Asit Mitra	25,109	12.02	−32.65
NOTA	None of the above	1,302	0.62	
Majority		26,205	12.55	
Turnout		208,810	79.73	
AITC gain from INC		Swing		

=== 2016 ===
In the 2016 election, Asit Mitra of Indian National Congress defeated his nearest rival Tushar Kanti Sil of Trinamool Congress.

2016 West Bengal state assembly election: Amta constituency
Party	Candidate	Votes	%	±%
INC	Asit Mitra	89,149	47.05	−4.77
AITC	Tushar Kanti Sil	84,645	44.67	
BJP	Suman Sarkar	11,045	5.83	+3.61
NOTA	None of the above	1,794	0.95	
Independent	Ratan Chandra Malick	1,379	0.73	
SUCI(C)	Sanjib Santra	789	0.42	
Independent	Dilip Kumar Hait	674	0.36	−0.13
Turnout		189,475	79.86	−2.55
INC hold		Swing		

=== 2011 ===
In the 2011 election, Asit Mitra of Congress defeated his nearest rival Rabindra Nath Mitra of CPI(M).

2011 West Bengal state assembly election: Amta constituency
Party	Candidate	Votes	%	±%
INC	Asit Mitra	88,264	51.82	+6.58#
CPI(M)	Rabindra Nath Mitra	74,545	43.76	−8.17
BJP	Sanat Hazra	3,781	2.22	
Independent	Ratan Chandra Malick	1,757		
Independent	Asit Sengupta	1,155		
Independent	Dilip Kumar Hait	835	0.49	
Turnout		170,337	82.41	
INC gain from CPI(M)		Swing	14.57#	

.# Swing calculated on Congress+Trinamool Congress vote percentages taken together in 2006.

=== 2006 ===
In the 2006, 2001 and 1996 state assembly elections, Pratyush Mukherjee of CPI(M) won the Amta assembly seat, defeating his nearest rivals Ashok Maji of Trinamool Congress in 2006 and 2001, and Prasun Bakuly of Congress in 1996. Contests in most years were multi cornered but only winners and runners are being mentioned. Barindranath Koley of CPI(M) defeated Aftabuddin Mondal of Congress in 1991 and 1987, Ainuddin Sk. of Congress in 1982, and Aftabuddin Mondal of Congress in 1977.

=== 1972 ===
Aftabuddin Mondal of Congress won in 1972. Barindranath Koley of CPI(M) won in 1971. Nitai Bhandari of CPI(M) won in 1969 and 1967. Tarapada Pramanick of Congress won in 1962. In 1957 Amta had two seats. Gobinda Charan Maji of PSP won the Amta East seat. Arabinda Roy of Congress won the Amta West seat. In 1951 Amta had three seats. Arabinda Roy of Congress won the Amta South seat. Tarapada Pramanick of Congress won the Amta Central seat. Alamohan Das, Independent, won the Amta North seat.
