= Bagnan Assembly constituency =

West Bengal Legislative Assembly constituency

Bagnan
- Constituency No. 180 for the West Bengal Legislative Assembly
- Interactive Map Outlining Bagnan Assembly Constituency

Constituency details
- Country: India
- Region: East India
- State: West Bengal
- District: Howrah
- Lok Sabha constituency: Uluberia
- Established: 1951
- Total electors: 180,514
- Reservation: None

Member of Legislative Assembly
- 18th West Bengal Legislative Assembly
- Incumbent Arunava Sen
- Party: Democratic Trinamool Congress
- Elected year: 2026

Bagnan Assembly constituency is an assembly constituency in Howrah district in the Indian state of West Bengal.

== Overview ==
As per orders of the Delimitation Commission, No. 180 Bagnan Assembly constituency is composed of the following: Bagnan II community development block, and Bagnan I, Bagnan II, Bangalpur, Haturia I, Haturia II and Khalore gram panchayats of Bagnan I community development block.

The constituency is part of Uluberia Lok Sabha constituency.

== Members of the Legislative Assembly ==
Year	Name	Party
1951	Shambhu Charan Mukhopadhyay	Indian National Congress
1957	Amal Kumar Ganguli	Communist Party of India
1962	Ranjit Kumar Ghosh Choudhury	Indian National Congress
1967	Ranjit Kumar Ghosh Choudhury	Indian National Congress
1969	Nirupama Chatterjee	Communist Party of India (Marxist)
1971	Nirupama Chatterjee	Communist Party of India (Marxist)
1972	Susanta Bhattacharjee	Indian National Congress
1977	Nirupama Chatterjee	Communist Party of India (Marxist)
1982	Nirupama Chatterjee	Communist Party of India (Marxist)
1987	Nirupama Chatterjee	Communist Party of India (Marxist)
1991	Nirupama Chatterjee	Communist Party of India (Marxist)
1996	Sabuj Dutta	Indian National Congress
2001	Nirupama Chatterjee	Communist Party of India (Marxist)
2006	Akkel Ali Khan	Communist Party of India (Marxist)
2011	Arunava Sen	Trinamool Congress
2016	Arunava Sen	Trinamool Congress
2021	Arunava Sen	Trinamool Congress
2026	Arunava Sen	Trinamool Congress

== Election results ==
=== 2026 ===
2026 West Bengal Legislative Assembly election: Bagnan
Party	Candidate	Votes	%	±%
AITC	Arunava Sen	105,060	48.1	−4.94
BJP	Pramanshu Rana	93,744	42.92	+4.95
CPI(M)	Bhaskar Roy	13,921	6.37	−0.91
NOTA	None of the above	2,048	0.94	+0.17
Majority		11,316	5.18	−9.89
Turnout		218,406	94.66	+8.19
AITC hold		Swing		

=== 2021 ===
2021 West Bengal Legislative Assembly election: Bagnan
Party	Candidate	Votes	%	±%
AITC	Arunava Sen	106,042	53.04	
BJP	Anupam Mallick	75,922	37.97	
CPI(M)	Sheikh Boshir Ahmed	14,555	7.28	
NOTA	None of the above	1,548	0.77	
Majority		30,120	15.07	
Turnout		199,935	86.47	
AITC hold		Swing		

=== 2016 ===
2016 West Bengal Legislative Assembly election: Bagnan
Party	Candidate	Votes	%	±%
AITC	Arunava Sen	97,834	54.10	▲0.55
CPI(M)	Mina Mukherjee Ghosh	67,637	37.40	▼3.68
BJP	Samiran Roy	10,332	5.71	▲3.14
NOTA	None of the above	2,222	1.23	New
Independent	Sanjit Patra	885	0.49	▼0.49
CPI(ML)L	Dilip Dey	470	0.26	▼0.19
IUC	Dilip Kumar Bauri	443	0.24	▼0.22
Majority		30,197	16.7	▲4.23
Turnout		1,80,838	85.91	▲0.4
AITC hold		Swing		

=== 2011 ===
2011 West Bengal Legislative Assembly election: Bagnan
Party	Candidate	Votes	%	±%
AITC	Arunava Sen	82,730	53.55	
CPI(M)	Akkel Ali Khan	63,460	41.08	
BJP	Tapan Kumar Mondal	3,965	2.57	
Independent	Sanjit Patra	1,519	0.98	
Independent	Abesh Mitra	764	0.49	
IUC	Anwar Mallick	710	0.46	
CPI(ML)L	Debabrata Bhakta	533	0.45	
Independent	Begam Fatema	410	0.27	
JD(U)	Amal Ghosh	386	0.25	
Majority		19,270	12.47	
Turnout		1,54,477	85.51	
AITC gain from CPI(M)		Swing		

=== 2006 ===
In the 2006 state assembly elections, Akkel Ali Khan of CPI(M) won the Bagnan assembly seat, defeating his nearest rival Arup Roy of Trinamool Congress. Contests in most years were multi cornered but only winners and runners are being mentioned. Nirupama Chatterjee of CPI(M) defeated Sabuj Dutta of Trinamool Congress in 2001. Sabuj Dutta of Congress defeated Nirupama Chatterjee of CPI(M) in 1996. Nirupama Chatterjee of CPI(M) defeated Sanat Kumar Misra of Congress in 1991, and Susanta Bhattacharjee of Congress in 1987, 1982 and 1977.

=== 1972 ===
Susanta Bhattacharjee of Congress won in 1972. Nirupama Chatterjee of CPI(M) won in 1971 and 1969. Ranjit Kumar Ghosh Choudhury of Congress won in 1967 and 1962. Amal Kumar Ganguli of CPI won in 1957. In independent India's first election in 1951, Sambhu Charan Mukhopadhyay of Congress won the Bagnan seat.
