= Sajda Ahmed =

Indian politician and social worker

Member of Parliament, Lok Sabha
- Incumbent
- Assumed office 1 February 2018
- Preceded by: Sultan Ahmed
- Constituency: Uluberia

Personal details
- Born: 22 June 1962 (age 64) Uluberia, West Bengal, India
- Party: Trinamool Congress
- Spouse: Sultan Ahmed (1985-2017)
- Children: Two Sons
- Education: University of Calcutta (B.A)
- Occupation: Politician

Sajda Ahmed (Bengali: সাজদা আহমেদ) is an Indian politician and a social worker. She is the wife of late MP Sultan Ahmed. She was elected to Lok Sabha by poll from Uluberia parliamentary constituency of West Bengal by margin of over 4.74 lakh votes and become member of Sixteenth Lok Sabha. She is elected in 2nd Term in 2019 to the 17th Lok Sabha.

== 2026 MPs Rebellion ==
Following the 2026 Assembly Elections, 20 out of the 28 Members of Parliament from Trinamool Congress decided to leave Mamata Banerjee and the Trinamool Congress. They formed a new group and decided to merge with a relatively little known National Party, the Nationalist Citizen Party of India and presented a representation in this regards to Lok Sabha Speaker Om Birla on 14 June 2026.

After this major split in the Trinamool Congress, only 8 Lok Sabha MPs remained loyal to Mamata Banerjee. The loyalist MPs included Abhishek Banerjee, Mahua Moitra, Sougata Roy, Kalyan Banerjee, Kirti Azad, Pratima Mondal and Sajda Ahmed.

The event is still unfolding.

== Election results ==
Source:Source

2019 Indian general elections: Uluberia
Party	Candidate	Votes	%	±%
AITC	Sajda Ahmed	6,94,945	53.00	▼8.00
BJP	Joy Banerjee	4,79,586	36.58	▲13.25
CPI(M)	Maksuda Khatun	81,314	6.20	▼11.04
INC	Shoma Ranishri Roy	27,568	2.10	▲0.26
Independent	Durgadas Hajra	6,770	0.52	▲0.52
NOTA	None of the above	9,399	0.72	▲0.01
Majority		2,15,359		
Turnout		13,11,120	81.18	
AITC hold		Swing	▼8.00	
