= Ali Ansar =

Indian politician

MLA of Kalyanpur
- In office 1972–1977
- Preceded by: Nitai Adak
- Succeeded by: Nitai Adak

Personal details
- Born: 1928/29
- Died: 30 November 2015
- Party: Communist Party of India

Ali Ansar was an Indian politician belonging to Communist Party of India. He was elected as a member of West Bengal Legislative Assembly from Kalyanpur in 1972. He died on 30 November 2015 at the age of 86.
