= Sultan Ahmed (Indian politician) =

Indian politician (1953–2017)

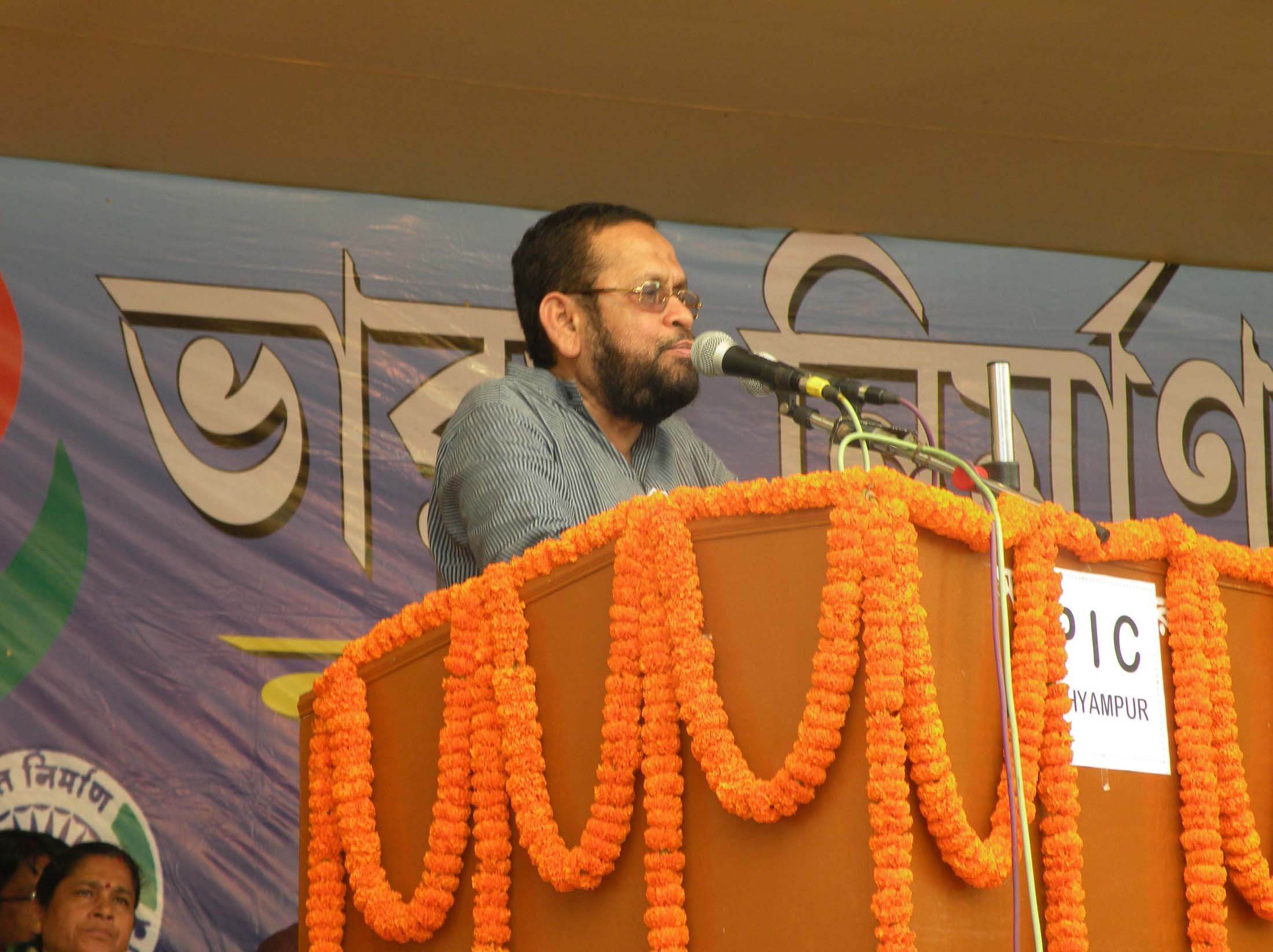
- Ahmed addressing at the inauguration of Bharat Nirman Public Information Campaign, at Shyampur, Howrah, November 13, 2010.

Minister of State for Tourism
- In office 16 May 2009 – 22 September 2012

Member of Parliament, Lok Sabha
- In office 2009–2017
- Preceded by: Hannan Mollah
- Succeeded by: Sajda Ahmed
- Constituency: Uluberia

Member of West Bengal Legislative Assembly
- In office 1996–2001
- Preceded by: Md. Nezamuddin
- Succeeded by: Mohammed Salim
- Constituency: Entally
- In office 1987–1991
- Preceded by: Md. Nezamuddin
- Succeeded by: Md. Nezamuddin
- Constituency: Entally

Personal details
- Born: 6 June 1953 Calcutta, West Bengal, India
- Died: 4 September 2017 (aged 64) Kolkata, West Bengal, India
- Party: Trinamool Congress (1998-2017); Indian National Congress (1975-1997)
- Spouse: Sajda Ahmed (m. 1985; his death 2017)
- Children: Two Sons
- Education: Maulana Azad College (B.A.); Calcutta University
- Profession: Politician; Businessperson

Sultan Ahmed (Bengali: সুলতান আহমেদ) (6 June 1953 – 4 September 2017) was an Indian politician and the Union Minister of State for Tourism in the Manmohan Singh government. He was elected to the 15th Lok Sabha from Uluberia (Lok Sabha constituency) on a Trinamool Congress ticket. He had previously been a 2-time Congress MLA for Entally (in 1987–91 and once again in 1996–2001).

== Political career ==
Sultan Ahmed joined the Chatra Parishad (student wing of INC) while studying at Maulana Azad College in 1969 and the Youth Congress in 1973. He was District Secretary of Youth Congress from 1978 to 1980. Sultan Ahmed also was one of the founding-members of Trinamool Congress in 1998. He had been secretary of Mohammedan Sporting Club Kolkata, and later President. Ahmed also served as president of Calcutta Muslim Orphanage and got many reforms in the body. He was also president of Muslim Institute and a member of All India Muslim Personal Law Board. He was renowned for his work in various other Minority Organisations in Kolkata. He was General Secretary of Muslim Institute in 1984 and President in 2017. Ahmed was also Vice Chairman of All India Hajj Committee from 2015 until the time of his death. He served as a chairman of West Bengal Minority Development and Finance Corporation.

== Death ==
Sultan Ahmed died on Monday, 4 September 2017 at the age of 64 of cardiac arrest. He had gone into cardiac arrest at his home at about 11:15 to 11:30 am.

== Family ==
He had two sons, Dr. Taha Ahmed who is currently working in Apollo Gleneagles and is married to Zeba Khan Ahmed who is a lecturer by profession and is the sister of Mohsin Khan and other son is Sharique Ahmed who is unmarried, Sharique is the Finance Secretary of Mohammedan Sporting Club, India.

Lok Sabha
| Preceded by Hannan Mollah | Member of Parliament for Uluberia; 2009 – 2017 | Succeeded by Sajda Ahmed |
