= Nirmal Maji =

Indian politician from West Bengal (b.1960)

Minister of State, Government of West Bengal
- In office 20 December 2018 – 4 May 2021
- Appointed by: Keshari Nath Tripathi
- Chief Minister: Mamata Banerjee
- Department: Labour

Member of the West Bengal Legislative Assembly
- In office 25 May 2011 – 4 May 2026
- Preceded by: Mohan Mondal
- Succeeded by: Chiran Bera
- Constituency: 177 - Uluberia Uttar, Howrah

Personal details
- Born: 15 September 1960 (age 65) Lurnpur, West Bengal, India
- Party: Trinamool Congress
- Parent: Dharmadas Maji (father)
- Education: M.B.B.S.; DGO; MTPT
- Alma mater: Medical College & Hospital, Kolkata; University of Calcutta
- Occupation: Politician; Medical Specialist

Nirmal Maji (born 15 September 1960) is an Indian medical administrator, practitioner and politician from West Bengal, who served as president of Indian Medical Association from Bengal branch. A member of Trinamool Congress, he is currently serving as member of West Bengal Legislative Assembly from Uluberia Uttar constituency since 2011. He also served as Cabinet Minister of State for Labour in West Bengal from 2018 till 2021.

== Controversy ==
Maji was linked to a dialysis scandal in 2015 at SSKM Hospital where his relative's dog was allegedly allowed to use the human dialysis unit. The procedure was halted due to intense protests from hospital doctors citing cross-infection risks. The alleged incident led to public outrage and the sudden transfer of the hospital's director.
