= Ashok Dhawale =

Indian politician (born 1952)

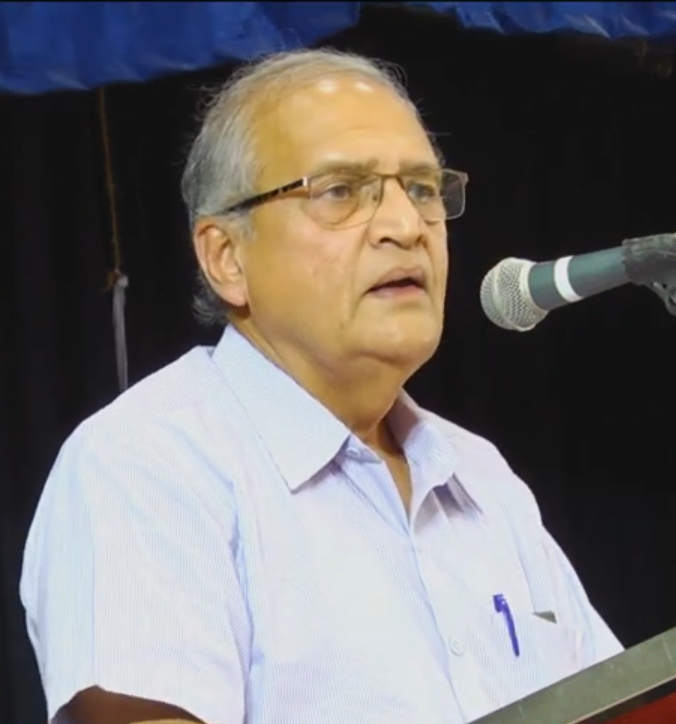

Member of the Politburo of the Communist Party of India (Marxist)
- Incumbent
- Assumed office 2022

President of All India Kisan Sabha
- Incumbent
- Assumed office 2017
- Preceded by: Amra Ram

Personal details
- Born: 14 July 1952 (age 74) Bombay, Bombay State, India
- Party: Communist Party of India (Marxist)
- Spouse: Mariam Dhawale
- Education: University of Mumbai (MBBS, MA)
- Occupation: Peasant leader; doctor

Ashok Dhawale (born 14 July 1952) is an Indian peasant leader and the National President of All India Kisan Sabha. He is one of the leaders of the Samyukta Kisan Morcha (SKM) which led a historic one-year long struggle that succeeded in getting the three Farm Laws repealed by the Central Government. He is also one of the leaders of the famous AIKS-led Kisan Long March in Maharashtra of 50,000 farmers from Nashik to Mumbai. He is a Communist Party of India (Marxist) leader and member of the Politburo of the CPI(M). He was also the State Secretary of the CPI(M) in Maharashtra for ten years.

== Early and personal life ==
Ashok Dhawale was born on 14 July 1952. He is a medical doctor by training, and did his graduation from T. N. Medical College and Nair Hospital, Mumbai. He also has a Masters in Political Science from Bombay University. He practised medicine from 1976 to 1983, but later became a full time political activist. He is married to Mariam Dhawale, the General Secretary of the All India Democratic Women's Association (AIDWA).

== Political career ==
=== Student and youth activism ===
Ashok Dhawale entered activism in 1978 through the Students Federation of India (SFI) while doing his Masters in Political Science from Bombay University. He was elected Chairman of the Bombay University Post Graduate Students’ Union in 1980. He was later elected the State General Secretary of SFI in Maharashtra and the All India Vice President of the organisation from 1981 to 1989. After student life, Dhawale became active in the youth movement, and became the State Secretary, State President, and the All India Vice President of the Democratic Youth Federation of India (DYFI) from 1989 to 1995.

=== Peasant leader ===
From 1993 onwards, Ashok Dhawale began working with All India Kisan Sabha. After the demise of AIKS leader Godavari Parulekar, Dhawale took the lead in re-building the peasant organisation in Maharashtra. He became the Maharashtra State Secretary of the AIKS from 2001 to 2009. He was elected as the President of AIKS at its 34th national conference in Hisar, Haryana held in 2017. He therefore became the third leader from Maharashtra to head AIKS after late Nana Patil and late Godavari Parulekar. The AIKS is the oldest and the largest farmers’ organization in India, with a current membership of 13.6 million farmers in 24 states of India.

Ashok Dhawale has led several struggles against the agrarian crisis in India. He fought for loan waivers, the rights of farmers to a remunerative minimum support price (MSP) and for stringent implementation of the Forest Rights Act for Adivasi Peasants. In June 2017, he was one of the leaders of the jointly led 11-day farmers’ strike in Maharashtra which succeeded in winning a large loan waiver for farmers from the State Government. In March 2018, he was prominent among those who led the 200 km-long, 50,000 farmers massive Kisan Long March, Maharashtra from Nashik to Mumbai under the banner of AIKS. The farmers, who also included thousands of women, walked for seven days demanding the implementation of the Forest Rights Act, and the Dr M S Swaminathan-headed National Commission on Farmers’ recommendation to give MSP to farmers at one and a half times their comprehensive cost of production. The farmers walked for seven days from Nashik to Mumbai demanding the implementation of the MS Swaminathan Commission report to reimburse farmers for their cost of production plus another 50 per cent. They also demanded pension for farmers and farm labourers above 60 years of age. Ashok Dhawale is one of the leaders of the Samyukt Kisan Morcha that led the victorious one-year long farmers' struggle for the repeal of the three Farm Acts in 2020-2021. In December 2021 he was elected as one of the members of the five-member committee of the SKM that held the final negotiations with the central government.[9] He is also a Working Group member of the All India Kisan Sangharsh Coordination Committee (AIKSCC) which had organized huge farmers’ marches to Parliament in Delhi in 2017 and 2018.

=== Communist politics ===
Ashok Dhawale joined the Communist Party of India (Marxist) in 1978. He is a member of the CPI(M) Central Committee since 1998, and has been elected to the CPI(M) Polit Bureau at the 23rd Party Congress of the Party held at Kannur in Kerala in April 2022. Here again, he is the third leader from Maharashtra to be elected to the CPI(M) Polit Bureau, after B T Ranadive and M K Pandhe. From 2005 to 2015, he was elected the State Secretary of the CPI(M) in Maharashtra. In this capacity, he took the lead in initiating several struggles in Maharashtra on political, social and economic issues, and made efforts to build the unity of all Left, democratic and secular forces.

=== Writings ===
Ashok Dhawale is a prolific writer in English and Marathi. For ten years he was the Editor of the CPI(M) Maharashtra state weekly ‘Jeevan Marg’. He is now on the editorial board of the CPI(M)’s central theoretical quarterly, ‘The Marxist’. He has been a regular contributor to the CPI(M) central weeklies ‘People’s Democracy’ and ‘Loklahar’, and other journals, for over 40 years. His latest book on the nationwide farmers’ struggle, ‘When Farmers Stood Up – How the Historic Kisan Struggle in India Unfolded’, was published in 2022 by LeftWord Books. Some of his earlier books are ‘The Kisan Long March in Maharashtra’, ‘Shaheed Bhagat Singh – An Immortal Revolutionary’, ‘Comrade Godavari Parulekar – A Centenary Tribute’, ‘China – Yesterday, Today, Tomorrow’, and many others.
