= Uluberia Uttar Assembly constituency =

Uluberia Uttar
- Constituency No. 177 for the West Bengal Legislative Assembly
- Interactive Map Outlining Uluberia Uttar Assembly Constituency

Constituency details
- Country: India
- Region: East India
- State: West Bengal
- District: Howrah
- Lok Sabha constituency: Uluberia
- Established: 1951
- Total electors: 170,566
- Reservation: SC

Member of Legislative Assembly
- 18th West Bengal Legislative Assembly
- Incumbent Chiran Bera
- Party: Bharatiya Janata Party
- Elected year: 2026

Uluberia Uttar is an assembly constituency in Howrah district in the Indian state of West Bengal. It is reserved for scheduled castes.

== Overview ==
As per orders of the Delimitation Commission, No. 177 Uluberia Uttar Assembly constituency (SC) is composed of the following: Amta, Bhandargachha, Chandrapur, Khardah, Raspur, Sirajbati, Udang I and Udang II gram panchayats of Amta I community development block and Baniban, Basudevpur, Joyargori, Tehatta Kantaberia I, Tehatta Kantaberia II and Tulsiberia gram panchayats of Uluberia II community development bloc.

Uluberia Uttar Assembly constituency is part of No. 26 Uluberia (Lok Sabha constituency).

== Members of the Legislative Assembly ==
| Year | Name | Party |
Uluberia
| 1951 | Bijoy Mondal | All India Forward Bloc |
| 1951 | Bibhuti Bhusan Ghosh | All India Forward Bloc |
| 1957 | Abani Kumar Basu | Indian National Congress |
| 1957 | Bijoy Bhusan Mondal | All India Forward Bloc |
Uluberia North
| 1962 | Bejoy Bhusan Mondal | All India Forward Bloc |
| 1967 | Apurbalal Majumdar | All India Forward Bloc |
| 1969 | Kalipada Mondal | All India Forward Bloc |
| 1971 | Raj Kumar Mondal | Communist Party of India |
| 1972 | Raj Kumar Mondal | Communist Party of India |
| 1977 | Raj Kumar Mondal | Communist Party of India |
| 1982 | Raj Kumar Mondal | Communist Party of India |
| 1987 | Raj Kumar Mondal | Communist Party of India |
| 1991 | Raj Kumar Mondal | Communist Party of India |
| 1996 | Ram Janam Majhi | Indian National Congress |
| 2001 | Mohan Mondal | Communist Party of India |
| 2006 | Mohan Mondal | Communist Party of India |
Uluberia Uttar
| 2011 | Dr. Nirmal Maji | All India Trinamool Congress |
| 2016 | Dr. Nirmal Maji | All India Trinamool Congress |
| 2021 | Dr. Nirmal Maji | All India Trinamool Congress |
| 2026 | Chiran Bera | Bharatiya Janata Party |

== Election results ==
=== 2026 ===
2026 West Bengal Legislative Assembly election: Uluberia Uttar
| Party | Candidate | Votes | % | ±% |
|---|---|---|---|---|
| BJP | Chiran Bera | 93,320 | 45.87 | +7.92 |
| AITC | Bimal Kumar Das | 89,143 | 43.81 | −5.44 |
| CPI(M) | Ashok Dolui | 14,720 | 7.23 | −3.15 |
| NOTA | None of the above | 1,091 | 0.54 | −0.13 |
| Majority | | 4,177 | 2.06 | −9.24 |
| Turnout | | 203,466 | 94.76 | +11.98 |
| BJP gain from AITC | | Swing | | |

=== 2021 ===
2021 West Bengal Legislative Assembly election: Uluberia Uttar
| Party | Candidate | Votes | % | ±% |
|---|---|---|---|---|
| AITC | Nirmal Maji | 91,501 | 49.25 | +1.12 |
| BJP | Chiran Bera | 70,498 | 37.95 | +29.79 |
| CPI(M) | Ashok Dalui | 19,292 | 10.38 | |
| NOTA | None of the above | 1,248 | 0.67 | |
| Majority | | 21,003 | 11.3 | |
| Turnout | | 185,780 | 82.78 | |
| AITC hold | | Swing | | |

=== 2016 ===
West Bengal assembly elections, 2016: Uluberia Uttar (SC) constituency
| Party | Candidate | Votes | % | ±% |
|---|---|---|---|---|
| AITC | Dr. Nirmal Maji | 79,390 | 48.13 | −4.32 |
| INC | Amiya Kumar Mondal | 65,208 | 39.53 | |
| BJP | Ananya Pandit | 13,457 | 8.16 | +3.78 |
| NOTA | None of the above | 1,909 | 1.16 | |
| BSP | Shyamapada Dhara | 1,208 | 0.73 | |
| Independent | Amiya Mondal | 1,050 | 0.64 | |
| Independent | Nirapada Pandit | 937 | 0.57 | |
| Indian Unity Centre | Mohit Kar | 875 | 0.53 | |
| Independent | Bimal Singha | 617 | 0.37 | |
| Independent | Ajit Dutta | 314 | 0.19 | |
| Turnout | | 164,965 | 82.71 | −2.69 |
| AITC hold | | Swing | | |

=== 2011 ===
West Bengal assembly elections, 2011: Uluberia Uttar (SC) constituency
| Party | Candidate | Votes | % | ±% |
|---|---|---|---|---|
| AITC | Dr. Nirmal Maji | 76,469 | 52.45 | +4.92# |
| CPI(M) | Bhim Ghuku | 58,021 | 39.79 | −9.11 |
| BJP | Archana Ray | 6,381 | 4.38 | |
| Independent | Subal Ghuku | 1,559 | | |
| BSP | Shyamapada Dhara | 1,427 | | |
| Indian Unity Centre | Mohit Kar | 1,180 | | |
| Independent | Ajit Kumar Maji | 767 | | |
| Turnout | | 145,840 | 85.40 | |
| AITC gain from CPI(M) | | Swing | 14.03# | |

.# Swing calculated on Congress+Trinamool Congress vote percentages taken together in 2006.

=== 2006 ===
In the 2006 and 2001 state assembly elections Mohan Mondal of CPI(M) won the Uluberia North assembly seat defeating Gopal Dolui and Ram Janam Majhi, both of Trinamool Congress, respectively. Contests in most years were multi cornered but only winners and runners are being mentioned. Ram Janam Majhi representing Congress defeated Asta Das of CPI(M) in 1996. Raj Kumar Mondal of CPI(M) defeated Gunakar Sinha of Congress in 1991, Gobinda Sinha of Congress in 1987, Gunakar Singh of Congress in 1982, and Arun Pramnik of Janata Party in 1977.

=== 1972 ===
Raj Kumar Mandal of CPI(M) won in 1972 and 1971. Kalipada Mondal of Forward Bloc won in 1969. A.L. Majumdar of Forward Bloc won in 1967. Bejoy Bhusan Mondal of Forward Bloc won in 1962. In 1957 and 1951 Uluberia had a double seat. Abani Kumar Basu of Congress and Bijoy Bhusan Mondal of Forward Bloc won in 1957. Bijoy Mondal and Bibhuti Bhusan Ghosh, both of All India Forward Bloc (Ruikar) won in 1951.
