= Mariam Dhawale =

Indian politician (born 1961)

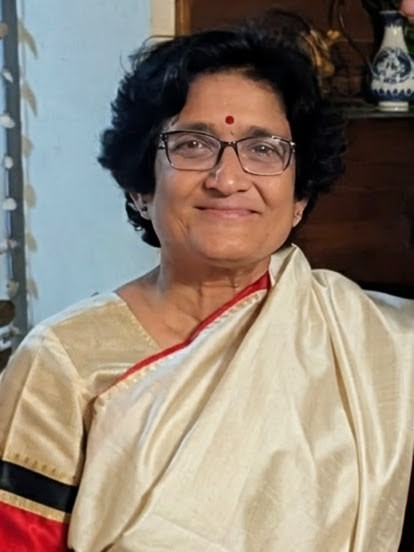
- Dhawale in 2024

Member of the Politburo of the Communist Party of India (Marxist)
- Incumbent
- Assumed office 6 April 2025

General Secretary of the All India Democratic Women's Association
- Incumbent
- Assumed office 2016
- Preceded by: Malini Bhattacharya

Personal details
- Born: Mariam Bootwala; 4 April 1961 Mumbai, Maharashtra, India
- Political party: Communist Party of India (Marxist)
- Spouse: Ashok Dhawale
- Education: University of Mumbai

Mariam Dhawale (née Bootwala; born 4 April 1961) is an Indian politician and women's rights activist affiliated with the Communist Party of India (Marxist). She serves as a member of the party's Politburo, its highest decision-making body, and has been the General Secretary of the All India Democratic Women's Association since 2016. Her political career spans student activism, rural organizing, and national leadership in mass movements for gender justice and secularism.

== Early life and education ==
Mariam Dhawale was born as Mariam Bootwala into a Muslim family. Influenced by the ideas of Bhagat Singh and other revolutionary figures, she later identified as an atheist. She completed her higher education at Wilson College in Mumbai, where her engagement in political activism began.

In 1979, she joined the Students’ Federation of India (SFI) and quickly rose through its ranks. She became the first woman to hold the position of State General Secretary of SFI in Maharashtra, later serving as All India Vice-President of the organization from 1988 to 1994.

== Political career ==
Following her involvement in the student movement, Dhawale joined the All India Democratic Women’s Association (AIDWA) in the 1990s, focusing on organizing women in rural and tribal regions of Maharashtra. She played a significant role in mobilizing marginalized communities around issues of education, domestic violence, healthcare access, and employment rights.

In 2016, she was elected General Secretary of AIDWA, becoming the national face of the organization. Under her leadership, AIDWA expanded its campaigns to address communal violence, caste-based discrimination, and neoliberal policies affecting women workers.

At the 24th Congress of the CPI(M) held in Madurai in 2022, Dhawale was elected to the Polit Bureau, replacing older leaders as part of a generational transition in party leadership.
