= Moondla, Huzur =

Moondla
- village
- Location within Madhya Pradesh Location within India
- Coordinates: 23.1620729°N 77.2606305°E
- Country: India
- State: Madhya Pradesh
- District: Bhopal
- Tehsil: Huzur
- Elevation: 524 m (1,719 ft)

Population (2011)
  - Total: 875
- Time zone: UTC+5:30 (IST)
- ISO 3166 code: MP-IN
- 2011 census code: 482498

Moondla is a village in the Bhopal district of Madhya Pradesh, India. It is located in the Huzur tehsil and the Phanda block.

== Demographics ==
According to the 2011 census of India, Moondla has 162 households. The effective literacy rate (i.e. the literacy rate of population excluding children aged 6 and below) is 70.29%.

Demographics (2011 Census)
	Total	Male	Female
Population	875	464	411
Children aged below 6 years	94	50	44
Scheduled caste	90	45	45
Scheduled tribe	7	4	3
Literates	549	351	198
Workers (all)	437	238	199
Main workers (total)	346	193	153
Main workers: Cultivators	309	162	147
Main workers: Agricultural labourers	2	1	1
Main workers: Household industry workers	10	9	1
Main workers: Other	25	21	4
Marginal workers (total)	91	45	46
Marginal workers: Cultivators	4	1	3
Marginal workers: Agricultural labourers	82	42	40
Marginal workers: Household industry workers	3	0	3
Marginal workers: Others	2	2	0
Non-workers	438	226	212
