= Chandgad =

- Town
- Location in Maharashtra, India
- Coordinates: 15°56′0″N 74°12′0″E
- Country: India
- State: Maharashtra
- District: Kolhapur

Government
  - Body: Nagarpanchayat

Population (2013)
  - Total: 12,000

Languages
  - Official: Marathi
- Time zone: UTC+5:30 (IST)
- PIN: 416509
- Telephone code: 02320
- Vehicle registration: MH.09
- Nearest city: Belgaum
- Website: kolhapur.gov.in/en/tehsil/

Chandgad is a small town and tehsil headquarters of Chandgad taluka, of Kolhapur district in the Indian state of Maharashtra. It is one of the 12 talukas in Kolhapur district. Citizens of Chandgad are reliant on the larger cities Belgaum and Gadhinglaj for their major needs.

== Demographics ==
The population for Chandgad town is 12,000 and the population density is around 796 people per sq. km. The population for the entire Taluka is approximately 187,220, according to the 2011 Census of India.

== Villages ==
- Kalyanpur, Maharashtra
- Kanadi-Padatewadi, also known as Kanadi village, is a village on the bank of the Ghatprabha river.
- Kagani, Kolhapur, Maharashtra

== History ==
Chandgad was formerly a part of Belagavi District, but during reorganization of Maharashtra state the entire taluka was merged into Kolhapur District.

Marathi and Chandgadi are the native languages. Konkani (Malwani Konkani) is spoken mostly in the western part. The Goan Catholic community speaks Goan Konkani.</ref> Konkani (Malwani Konkani) is spoken mostly in the western part. The Goan Catholic community speaks Goan Konkani.

== Geography ==
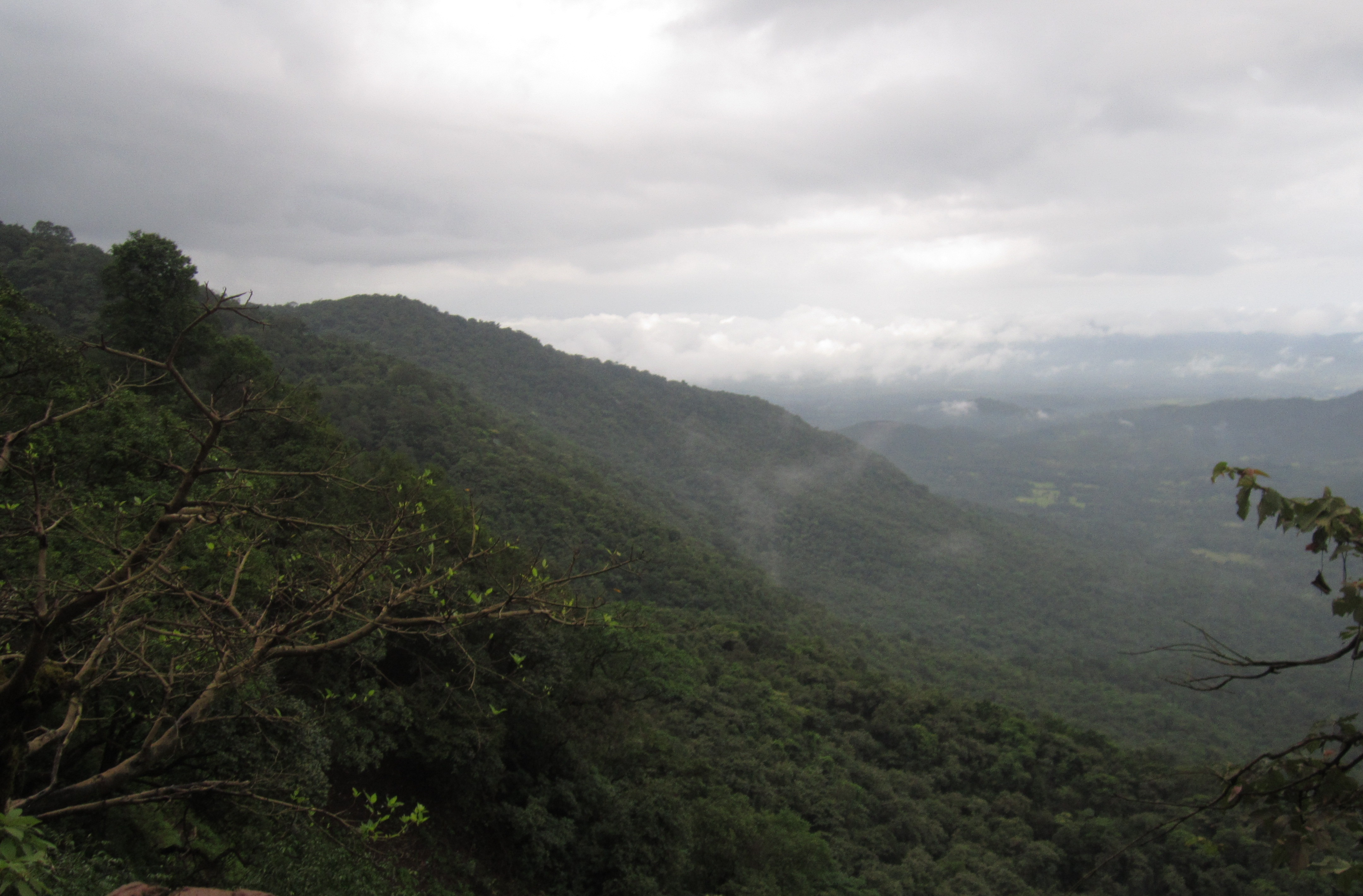
A major biodiversity hotspot, Western Ghat near Chandgad

Chandgad is located approximately 110 km (68 mi) from Kolhapur and 36 km (22 mi) from Belgaum City. Chandgad is located on the Belgaum-Vengurle state highway. Amboli hill station is 32 km (20 mi) away.

Chandgad is the southernmost taluka of Kolhapur district. Chandgad is an incredibly wet taluka, receiving nearly 3000 mm in rainfall, however, talukas like GaganBawada and Radhanagari receive the highest rainfall in the Kolhapur district, averaging well over 3500 mm to 6000 mm annually. The main source of rainfall is the Arabian Sea branch of the South-West monsoon. Rainy season lasts from June to September with occasional rainfall in October and November. Part of the Western Ghats, Chandgad's surroundings are rich in biodiversity. It is covered with dense lush green forest.

Ghataprabha and Tamraparni are the largest rivers. Of many dams in Chandgad, Jangam Hatti is the major source of water to many villages in Chandgad Taluka. The Jangam Hatti Dam, is located on the Honhal tributary of the Tamraparni river and has a capacity of roughly 34 million cubic meters.

== Economy ==
The economy of Chandgad is primarily Agriculture based, with heavy focus on rice, sugar cane, cashew nut, sweet potato, and potato farming. The area is home to numerous cashew nut tree plantations, and is a prominent regional hub for cashew farming.

== Climate ==
The rainy season witnesses heavy rains by the South-West Monsoon. The monsoon period is from June to September with rainfall averaging more than 3000 mm every year and heavy winds. It is located on the Western Ghat and temperatures in the range of 36°C to 29°C during summer and 21°C to 14°C during winter.

Climate data for Chandgad
Month	Jan	Feb	Mar	Apr	May	Jun	Jul	Aug	Sep	Oct	Nov	Dec	Year
Mean daily maximum °C (°F)	30 (86)	32 (90)	35 (95)	36 (97)	34 (93)	29 (84)	26 (79)	26 (79)	28 (82)	29 (84)	29 (84)	29 (84)	30 (86)
Mean daily minimum °C (°F)	14 (57)	15 (59)	18 (64)	21 (70)	21 (70)	21 (70)	21 (70)	20 (68)	20 (68)	19 (66)	17 (63)	15 (59)	19 (65)
Average precipitation mm (inches)	1.1 (0.04)	0.2 (0.01)	2.9 (0.11)	24.4 (0.96)	30 (1.2)	500.1 (19.69)	799.8 (31.49)	900.2 (35.44)	450.1 (17.72)	203.4 (8.01)	80.3 (3.16)	20.1 (0.79)	3,012.6 (118.62)
