= Kalyanpura, Bhopal =

Kalyanpura
- village
- Location within Madhya Pradesh Location within India
- Coordinates: 23.3682555°N 77.4214278°E
- Country: India
- State: Madhya Pradesh
- District: Bhopal
- Tehsil: Huzur
- Elevation: 479 m (1,572 ft)

Population (2011)
  - Total: 122
- Time zone: UTC+5:30 (IST)
- ISO 3166 code: MP-IN
- 2011 census code: 482416

Kalyanpura is a village in the Bhopal district of Madhya Pradesh, India. It is located in the Huzur tehsil and the Phanda block.

== Demographics ==
According to the 2011 census of India, Kalyanpura has 27 households. The effective literacy rate (i.e. the literacy rate of population excluding children aged 6 and below) is 77.57%.

Demographics (2011 Census)
	Total	Male	Female
Population	122	68	54
Children aged below 6 years	15	8	7
Scheduled caste	37	21	16
Scheduled tribe	4	2	2
Literates	83	50	33
Workers (all)	78	47	31
Main workers (total)	27	18	9
Main workers: Cultivators	17	12	5
Main workers: Agricultural labourers	8	4	4
Main workers: Household industry workers	0	0	0
Main workers: Other	2	2	0
Marginal workers (total)	51	29	22
Marginal workers: Cultivators	6	4	2
Marginal workers: Agricultural labourers	34	17	17
Marginal workers: Household industry workers	0	0	0
Marginal workers: Others	11	8	3
Non-workers	44	21	23
