= Chiran Bera =

Indian politician (born 1989)

Member of the West Bengal Legislative Assembly
- Incumbent
- Assumed office 4 May 2026
- Preceded by: Nirmal Maji
- Constituency: Uluberia Uttar (SC)

Personal details
- Born: 1989 (age 36–37) Uluberia, Howrah district, West Bengal, India
- Party: Bharatiya Janata Party
- Parent: Tapan Bera (father)
- Education: Madhyamik (Class 10)
- Alma mater: Joargori Union High School
- Occupation: Politician, fisherman

Chiran Bera (born 1989) is an Indian politician from West Bengal. He is a member of the West Bengal Legislative Assembly from the Uluberia Uttar Assembly constituency, which is reserved for the Scheduled Caste community, in Howrah district representing the Bharatiya Janata Party.

== Early life and education ==
Bera is from Uluberia, Howrah district, West Bengal. He is the son of Tapan Bera. He studied till Class 10 at Joargori Union High School and passed the Madhyamik examinations conducted by the West Bengal Board of Secondary Education in 2007. He is a fisherman and declared assets worth Rs.17,000 in his affidavit to the Election Commission of India.

== Career ==
Bera won the Uluberia Uttar Assembly constituency representing the Bharatiya Janata Party in the 2026 West Bengal Legislative Assembly election. He polled 93,320 votes and defeated his nearest rival, Bimal Kumar Das of the All India Trinamool Congress (AITC), by a margin of 4,177 votes. Earlier in the 2021 West Bengal Legislative Assembly election, he lost to Nirmal Maji of the Trinamool Congress by a margin of 21,003 votes.
