= Arunava Sen (politician) =

Indian politician

Arunava Sen অরুণাভ সেন
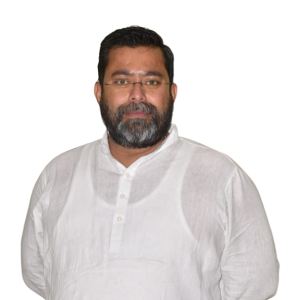
- Arunava Sen (Bagnan)

Member of the West Bengal Legislative Assembly
- In office 2011–Present
- Preceded by: Akkel Ali Khan
- Constituency: Bagnan

Personal details
- Born: January 27, 1976 (age 50) Bagnan
- Party: Trinamool Congress (until 2026); Democratic Trinamool Congress (from 2026)
- Nickname: Raja

Arunava Sen is an Indian politician. He is serving as MLA of Bagnan Vidhan Sabha Constituency in West Bengal Legislative Assembly. He is an Democratic Trinamool Congress politician.

State Legislative Assembly
Preceded by Akkel Ali Khan	Member of the West Bengal Legislative Assembly from Bagnan Assembly constituency 2011–	Incumbent
