= Asit Mitra =

Indian politician

Asit Mitra is an Indian National Congress politician. He was a member of the West Bengal Legislative Assembly from 1996 to 2021, elected twice in 1996 and 2001 from Kalyanpur and twice in 2011 and 2016 from Amta. He was given the responsibility of being the Congress's Purulia district observer by the West Bengal Pradesh Congress in 2021.
