= Godavari Parulekar =

Indian social activist (1907–1996)

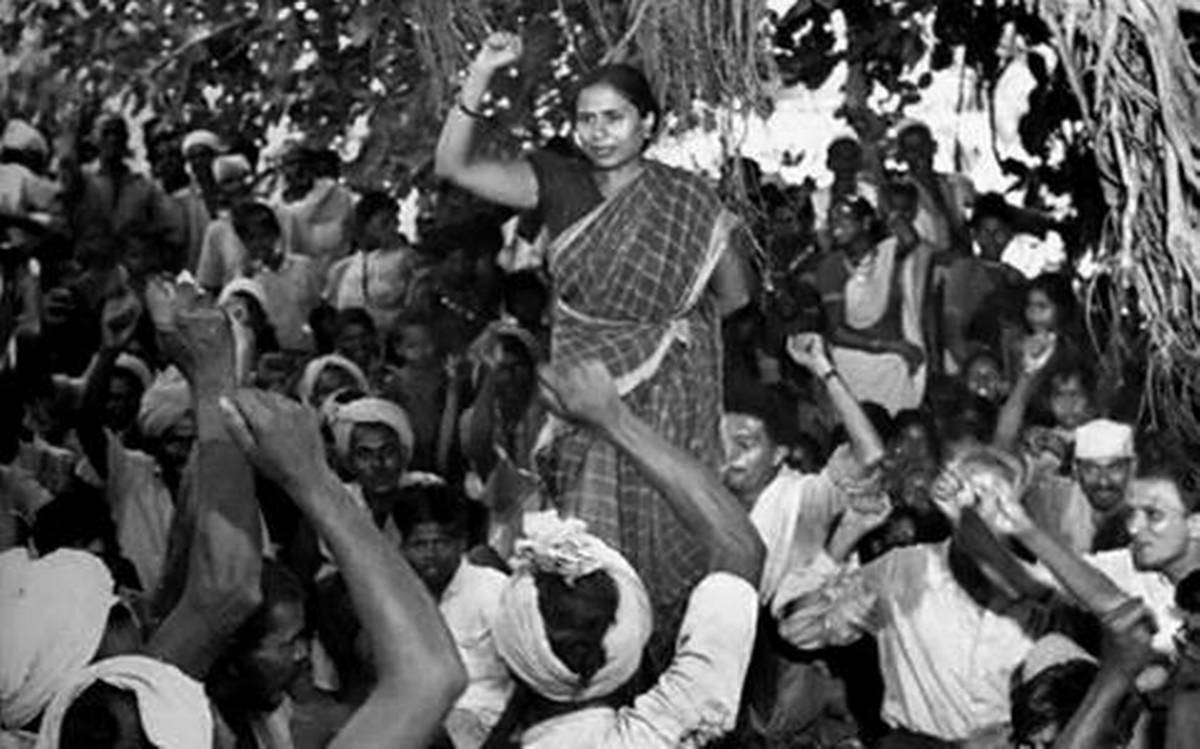
- Born: Godavari Gokhale; 14 August 1907; Pune
- Died: 8 October 1996 (aged 89)
- Known for: All India Kisan Sabha; Liberation of Dadra and Nagar Haveli
- Notable work: Jewha Manus Jaga Hoto
- Political party: Communist Party of India (Marxist)
- Movement: Servants of India Society
- Spouse: Shamrao Parulekar
- Awards: Sahitya Akademi award

Godavari Parulekar (14 August 1907 – 8 October 1996) was a freedom fighter, writer, and social activist. She was influenced by Marxist and Communist ideologies and spent her life fighting for the farmers and working class. She was married to Shamrao Parulekar, another freedom fighter and activist with the same ideologies.

== Early life ==
Godavari Gokhale was born on 14 August 1907 in Pune. Her father Laxmanrao Gokhale was a renowned lawyer. She received a good education, since she was born in a well-to-do family. She graduated from Fergusson College and then studied law, becoming the first woman law graduate in Maharashtra.

== Early activism ==
In her college years Godavari became involved in the student movement against the British. She participated in individual Satyagrahas and was imprisoned for that in 1932. This did not go with her moderate family, who was comfortable with the British rule. She left the house and decided to join social service in Mumbai.

Godavari joined the Servants of India Society. She was the first female life member. In 1937 she organized a literacy campaign in Maharashtra. In 1938 she unionized the domestic workers as a part of the working class. In 1938-39 she organized the farmers in Thane district of Maharashtra.

She was imprisoned many times by the British for her work. During this time she met her husband Shamrao Parulekar. He was also a member of Servants of India and was running protests in the same area. Godavari married Shamrao Parulekar in 1939.

== Joining the communist party ==
Godavari and Shamrao Parulekar’s ideologies did not match those of the Servants of India Society. During World War II, they believed that refusing to support the British’s war efforts was the best way to get rid of them. After some clashes, they left the organization and joined the Communist Party of India in 1939. Godavari believed that organizing the working class and farmers was the best way to overthrow the British rule. She was inspired by Marxism. Along with the leaders of the CPI, she organized the first anti-war strike of the working class in Mumbai. Even after other leaders were captured, she led the protests. She was imprisoned from 1940 to 1942.

== Work with farmers and adivasis ==
Then she shifted her focus to organizing farmers. She joined the All India Kisan Sabha and founded its Maharashtra branch, the Maharashtra Rajya Kisan Sabha. She was the first joint secretary of the Sabha.

She then devoted her life to the struggle of the Warli Community in Thane, who was being pushed into forced and bonded labour by wealthy landlords. The Warli women were being raped by landlords, and accused of witchcraft and killed. She led the Warli Adivasi Revolt from 1945 to 1947 along with her husband Shamrao. She documented the movements in her book Jewha Manus Jaga Hoto (The Awakening of Man).

After independence also Godavari kept fighting for the rights of Warlis and Adivasis. She founded the Adivasi Pragati Mandal (Tribal Progress Council) with Shamrao in 1961.

== Founding the CPI (M) in Thane District ==
The Communist Party of thane broke in 1964. almost the entire Party in Thane district, led by the Parulekars, unswervingly came over to the CPI(M) Communist Party of India (Marxist). Both Shamrao and Godavari were among the 163 leaders of the Party in Maharashtra who were then in jail. Shamrao and Godavari were elected to the state secretariat..

== Later life ==
After Shamrao’s death in 1965, Godavari continued to lead the CPI (M). In 1986, she became the first female president of the All India Kisan Sabha.

She died on 8 October 1996.

== Written works ==
Godavari captured her struggles in her books. Her most popular book is Jewha Manus Jaga Hoto (The Awakening of Man). It was published in 1970, and received the Sahitya Akademi award in 1972. It also won the Jawaharlal Nehru Award and the Soviet Land Award. It has been translated into many languages, including English and Japanese.

Her other books are: Adivasi revolt: the story of Warli peasants in struggle and Bandivasachi aath varsh (Eight Years of Imprisonment)

== Recognition ==
Godavari was given the Lokmanya Tilak Award and the Savitribai Phule Award for her service towards the marginalized and downtrodden communities in India.
