= Kalyanpur, Goalpara =

Kalyanpur, Goalpara is a village in Goalpara district of Assam state of India.
