= Marubai Temple, Matunga =

Hindu temple in India

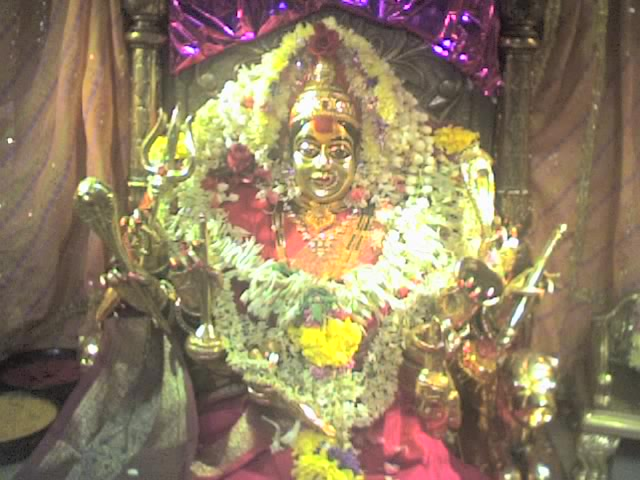
The Divine Mother, Marubai, Matunga

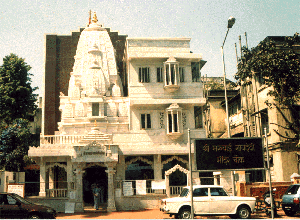
Marubai Temple, Matunga

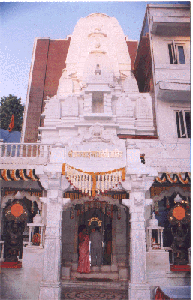
Marubai Temple, Matunga

== Origin ==
Known since 1700 AD, Matunga was a cluster of villages, which later on were brought under a single governing umbrella by the ruling British. The area was called Marubai Tekdi Gaon, which is said was shortened to MaTunGa (Matunga). Marubai is the traditional Gaondevi (village Goddess) of Matunga whose small temple existed under a peepal tree at King's Circle.

The then British Government planned to develop Bombay (Mumbai). Under the provisions of the City of Bombay Improvement Act, 1898, certain lands situated within the Island of Bombay were required for public purpose namely the Matunga Road Scheme, now the road is known as Dr. B. R. Ambedkar Road. So the authorities then decided to shift the Marubai temple from the Kings Circle peepal tree to a different location as it came in the way of the road building plan. However, they had to face tremendous opposition from the residents who feared they would invite the wrath of the Goddess if they shifted Her from Her original location.

The residents of the village then once again managed the new temple. In 1952 the Marubai Trust was formed under the Bombay Public Trust Act with Registration Number as “A2222(Mumbai)” .

== Trustees ==
The trustees managing the temple are descendants of those families who are managing the temple for last centuries. The First Trustee Shri. Kashinath Bhikaji Gavand was appointed in the same year. He was the father of present Managing Trustee Shri. Anil Gavand. After death of Shri. Kashinath Gavand, Shri. Anil Gavand was appointed the Managing Trustee in 1987.
