= Kalyanpur, Puri =

Village in Odisha

Coordinates: 20.034735°N 85.693424°E

Kalyanpur (also Kalyanapur) is a small village which is situated in Delang block of Puri district, Odisha, India. The total number of inhabitants of this village is around 3,000. It is situated around 42 kilometers away from Puri District and 65 kilometers away from capital of Odisha, Bhubaneswar.

There are five schools, one post office, one medical, and one junior college.

== Sources ==
- Census of India, 1981: District census handbook. A, Village & town directory; B, Primary census abstract. Controller of Publications, India
