= Kisan Long March =

Large scale protest march in India

Kisan Long March, Maharashtra
- Date: March 06, 2018 — March 12, 2018
- Location: From Nashik to Mumbai, Maharashtra
- Caused by: Large scale destruction of crops due to unpredictable weather and poor rainfall; Improper implementation of loan waiver schemes for farmers announced in 2017 by the Maharashtra government
- Goals: Complete and proper implementation of the loan waiver scheme announced in 2017; Implementation of the Forest Rights Act, 2006; Compensation for damages to cotton crops resulting from bollworm infestation and the unseasonal rains and hailstorm; Implementation of the Swaminathan Commission recommendation for fixing the minimum support price at one-and-a-half times the cost of production
- Result: 6,00,000 to 8,00,000 people participate in what turned out to be one of the biggest peaceful protests the country has seen in recent times; Farmers march 180km from Nashik to Mumbai, Maharashtra over 6 days and gherao the Maharashtra Vidhan Sabha; All India Kisan Sabha, the peasants front of the Communist Party of India (Marxist) that organized the protest, call it off upon assurances being made by the Maharashtra government

Kisan Rally or Kisan Long March was a large scale protest march by farmers in the Indian state of Maharashtra, organized by the All India Kisan Sabha, the peasants front of the Communist Party of India (Marxist). Around 60,000 to 70,000 farmers marched a distance of 200 km from Nashik to Mumbai to gherao the Maharashtra Vidhan Sabha. The peaceful march came to a conclusion on March 12, 2018, after the Government of Maharashtra gave assurances for fulfillment of said demands. These assurances however, were not executed which resulted in Kisan Long March 2 which commenced on February 27, 2019, but was suspended soon after.

== Background ==
The farming sector in the state of Maharashtra was badly affected by numerous factors including unseasonal rainfalls, hailstorm, and pest infestations. An estimated 2414 farmers had taken their lives in the state between January 1 and October 31, 2017. Considering these issues, among others, the government had announced a conditional loan waiver amounting to Rs 34,000 crore in 2017, but it was not implemented as promised.

The long march was inspired and led by the Kisan Sabha leaders Ajit Nawale, Ashok Dhawale, Jiva Pandu Gavit and Vijoo Krishnan.

== See also ==
2020–2021 Indian farmers' protest
