= Amit Samanta =

Indian politician

Member of the West Bengal Legislative Assembly
- Incumbent
- Assumed office 2026
- Preceded by: Sukanta Kumar Paul
- Constituency: Amta

Personal details
- Party: Bharatiya Janata Party
- Education: University of Calcutta (BA)
- Profession: Politician

Amit Samanta is an Indian politician from West Bengal. He is a member of the West Bengal Legislative Assembly from Amta representing the Bharatiya Janata Party (BJP).

Samanta earned a bachelor's degree from the University of Calcutta in 2010.

== Career ==
Samanta won the Amta seat in the 2026 West Bengal Legislative Assembly election as a candidate for the Bharatiya Janata Party (BJP). He received 104,649 votes and defeated the incumbent, Sukanta Kumar Paul of the All India Trinamool Congress, by a margin of 4,454 votes.
