= Kalyanpur, Bhopal (census code 482425) =

Kalyanpur
- village
- Location within Madhya Pradesh Location within India
- Coordinates: 23.32594203°N 77.49957561°E
- Country: India
- State: Madhya Pradesh
- District: Bhopal
- Tehsil: Huzur
- Elevation: 513 m (1,683 ft)

Population (2011)
  - Total: 694
- Time zone: UTC+5:30 (IST)
- ISO 3166 code: MP-IN
- 2011 census code: 482425

Kalyanpur is a village in the Bhopal district of Madhya Pradesh, India. It is located in the Huzur tehsil and the Phanda block. It is situated near the Bhopal Bypass road; the nearest railway station is in Sukhi Sewaniya.

== Demographics ==
According to the 2011 census of India, Kalyanpur has 158 households. The effective literacy rate (i.e. the literacy rate of population excluding children aged 6 and below) is 67.8%.

Demographics (2011 Census)
	Total	Male	Female
Population	694	370	324
Children aged below 6 years	104	61	43
Scheduled caste	296	152	144
Scheduled tribe	16	10	6
Literates	400	244	156
Workers (all)	227	200	27
Main workers (total)	205	184	21
Main workers: Cultivators	128	119	9
Main workers: Agricultural labourers	73	61	12
Main workers: Household industry workers	0	0	0
Main workers: Other	4	4	0
Marginal workers (total)	22	16	6
Marginal workers: Cultivators	13	11	2
Marginal workers: Agricultural labourers	9	5	4
Marginal workers: Household industry workers	0	0	0
Marginal workers: Others	0	0	0
Non-workers	467	170	297
