= Kalyanpur, Nuwakot =

Kalyanpur कल्याणपुर
- Village development committee
- Location in Nepal
- Coordinates: 27.56°N 85.7°E
- Country: Nepal
- Zone: Bagmati Zone
- District: Nuwakot District

Population (1991)
  - Total: 5,503
- Time zone: UTC+5:45 (Nepal Time)

Kalyanpur is a village development committee in Nuwakot District in the Bagmati Zone of central Nepal. At the time of the 1991 Nepal census it had a population of 5503 living in 979 individual households.
