= Dehriya Kalan =

- village
- Location within Madhya Pradesh Location within India
- Coordinates: 23.153875°N 77.244825°E
- Country: India
- State: Madhya Pradesh
- District: Bhopal
- Tehsil: Huzur

Population (2011)
  - Total: 496
- Time zone: UTC+5:30 (IST)
- ISO 3166 code: MP-IN
- Census code: 482499

Dehriya Kalan is a village in the Bhopal district of Madhya Pradesh, India. It is located in the Huzur tehsil and the Phanda block.

== Demographics ==
According to the 2011 census of India, Dehriya Kalan has 86 households. The effective literacy rate (i.e. the literacy rate of population excluding children aged 6 and below) is 67.45%.

Demographics (2011 Census)
	Total	Male	Female
Population	496	239	257
Children aged below 6 years	72	34	38
Scheduled caste	61	30	31
Scheduled tribe	4	2	2
Literates	286	172	114
Workers (all)	253	136	117
Main workers (total)	226	121	105
Main workers: Cultivators	204	108	96
Main workers: Agricultural labourers	12	7	5
Main workers: Household industry workers	0	0	0
Main workers: Other	10	6	4
Marginal workers (total)	27	15	12
Marginal workers: Cultivators	3	2	1
Marginal workers: Agricultural labourers	21	10	11
Marginal workers: Household industry workers	1	1	0
Marginal workers: Others	2	2	0
Non-workers	243	103	140
