= Aurobindo Ghosal =

Indian politician

Member of Parliament, Lok Sabha
- In office 1957–1962
- Preceded by: Satyaban Roy
- Succeeded by: Purnendu Khan
- Constituency: Uluberia, West Bengal

Personal details
- Born: March 1, 1914 Mahisadal, Midnapore District, Bengal Presidency, British India
- Party: Marxist Forward Bloc
- Spouse: Sipra Debi
- Children: 2 daughters

Aurobindo Ghosal was an Indian politician. He was elected to the Lok Sabha, the lower house of the Parliament of India from Uluberia in West Bengal as a member of the Marxist Forward Bloc.
