= Kalyanpur, West Bengal Assembly constituency =

Coordinates: 22.35°N 88.42°E

Kalyanpur
- Former constituency No. 174 for the West Bengal Legislative Assembly

Constituency details
- Country: India
- Region: East India
- State: West Bengal
- District: Howrah
- Lok Sabha constituency: Uluberia
- Established: 1967
- Abolished: 2011
- Reservation: None

Kalyanpur Assembly constituency was an assembly constituency in Howrah district in the Indian state of West Bengal.

== Overview ==
As a consequence of the orders of the Delimitation Commission, while Uluberia Purba Assembly constituency came into existence in 2011, Kalyanpur Assembly constituency ceased to exist from the same year.

Kalyanpur Assembly constituency was part of Uluberia (Lok Sabha constituency).

== Members of the Legislative Assembly ==
Election Year	Constituency	Name of M.L.A.	Party affiliation
1967		Sunil Kuamr Mitra	Bangla Congress
1969		Sunil Kumar Mitra	Bangla Congress
1971		Nitai Adak	Communist Party of India (Marxist)
1972		Ali Ansar	Communist Party of India
1977		Nitai Charan Adak	Communist Party of India (Marxist)
1982		Nitai Charan Adak	Communist Party of India (Marxist)
1987		Nitai Charan Adak	Communist Party of India (Marxist)
1991		Nitai Charan Adak	Communist Party of India (Marxist)
1996		Asit Mitra	Indian National Congress
2001		Asit Mitra	Indian National Congress
2006		Rabindranath Mitra	Communist Party of India (Marxist)

== Election results ==
=== 1977-2006 ===
In the 2006 West Bengal Legislative Assembly election Rabindranath Mitra of CPI(M) won the 174 Kalyanpur assembly seat defeating Asit Mitra of Congress. Asit Mitra of Congress won the seat defeating Rabindranath Mitra of CPI(M) in 2001 and Maqsud Ahmed of CPI(M) in 1996. Nitai Charan Adak of CPI(M) defeated Sakti Sadhan Chowdhury of Congress in 1991, Asit Mitra representing Congress in 1987 and ICS in 1982, and Arabinda Roy of Janata Party in 1977.

=== 1967-1972 ===
Ali Ansari of CPI won in 1972. Nitai Adak of CPI(M) won in 1971. Sunil Kumar Mitra of Bangla Congress won in 1969 and 1967.
