= Kalyanpur, Baruipur =

Kalyanpur
- Village
- Location in West Bengal Location in India
- Coordinates: 22.3508°N 88.4171°E
- Country: India
- State: West Bengal
- District: South 24 Parganas
- CD Block: Baruipur
- Elevation: 9 m (30 ft)

Languages
  - Official: Bengali
  - Additional official: English
- Time zone: UTC+5:30 (IST)
- PIN: 743610
- Telephone code: +91 33
- Vehicle registration: WB-19 to WB-22, WB-95 to WB-99
- Lok Sabha constituency: Jadavpur
- Vidhan Sabha constituency: Baruipur Paschim
- Website: www.s24pgs.gov.in

Kalyanpur is a village and a gram panchayat within the jurisdiction of the Baruipur police station in the Baruipur CD block in the Baruipur subdivision of the South 24 Parganas district in the Indian state of West Bengal.

== Geography ==
Kalyanpur is located at 22°21′03″N 88°25′02″E. It has an average elevation of 9 metres (30 ft).

== Demographics ==
According to the 2011 Census of India, there were three mouzas in Kalyanpur. Uttar Kalyanpur had a total population of 1,161, of which 603 (52%) were males and 558 (48%) were females. There were 119 persons in the age range of 0 to 6 years. The total number of literate persons in Uttar Kalyanpur was 956 (91.75% of the population over 6 years). Dakshin Kalyanpur had a total population of 1,638, of which 833 (51%) were males and 805 (49%) were females. There were 129 persons in the age range of 0 to 6 years. The total number of literate persons in Dakshin Kalyanpur was 1,335 (88.47% of the population over 6 years). Madhya Kalyanpur had a total population of 1,235, of which 638 (52%) were males and 597 (48%) were females. There were 105 persons in the age range of 0 to 6 years. The total number of literate persons in Madhya Kalyanpur was 1,064 (94.16% of the population over 6 years).

== Transport ==
A short stretch of local roads link Kalyanpur to the State Highway 1.

Kalyanpur railway station is on the Sealdah–Diamond Harbour line of the Kolkata Suburban Railway system.

=== Commuters ===
With the electrification of the railways, suburban traffic has grown tremendously since the 1960s. As of 2005–06, more than 1.7 million (17 lakhs) commuters use the Kolkata Suburban Railway system daily. After the partition of India, refugees from erstwhile East Pakistan and Bangladesh had a strong impact on the development of urban areas in the periphery of Kolkata. The new immigrants depended on Kolkata for their livelihood, thus increasing the number of commuters. Eastern Railway runs 1,272 EMU trains daily.

== Healthcare ==
Hariharpur Block Primary Health Centre, with 10 beds, at Hariharpur (PO Mallikpur), is the major government medical facility in the Baruipur CD block.
