= Shyamaprasanna Bhattacharyya =

Indian politician

Member of Parliament, Lok Sabha
- In office 1971–1980
- Preceded by: J. K. Mondal
- Succeeded by: Hannan Mollah
- Constituency: Uluberia, West Bengal

Personal details
- Born: September 1905 Calcutta, Bengal Presidency, British India
- Party: Communist Party of India (Marxist)
- Spouse: Purnalakshmi Devi

Shyamaprasanna Bhattacharyya was an Indian politician. He was elected to the Lok Sabha, the lower house of the Parliament of India from the Uluberia in West Bengal as a member of the Communist Party of India (Marxist).
