= Kalyanpur, Maharashtra =

Kalyanpur
- Village
- Location in Maharashtra, India
- Coordinates: 15°56′0″N 74°12′0″E
- Country: India
- State: Maharashtra
- District: Kolhapur

Languages
  - Official: Marathi
- Time zone: UTC+5:30 (IST)
- PIN: 416508
- Telephone code: 02320
- ISO 3166 code: IN-MH
- Vehicle registration: MH.09
- Nearest city: Belgaum
- Literacy: 65.71%
- Lok Sabha constituency: Kolhapur
- Vidhan Sabha constituency: Chandgad

Kalyanpur is a small village in Chandgad taluka and in tehsil Gadhinglaj subdivision of Kolhapur district in the Indian state of Maharashtra. It has a population of about 300.

Kalyanpur is 30 km from Chandgad and 30 km from Belgaum City. Kovad is 4 km away. People are heavily reliant on Belgaum and Gadhinglaj cities for their day-to-day needs.

Belgaum is the nearest railhead.

== History ==
People's are migrated from neighbouring villages to look after their land holdings and slowly the village was formed. In kalyanpur most of population belongs to Schedule tribes i.e Hindu Mahadev Koli Cast . peoples calibrate tribal tradition songs and dance. mostly peoples are depend on Mountains for their daily needs such as collecting fire wood and Grass for making shelters for domestic animals.

== Language ==
The official language is Marathi but Kannada is also spoken here.

== People ==
Agriculture is the main occupation here. It is dependent on monsoon rains.

School is up to Primary only; for further studies students has to go to the neighbouring village Kagani and Kowad.
