= Teela Khedi =

Teela Khedi Teelakhedi
- village
- Location within Madhya Pradesh Location within India
- Coordinates: 23.1790859°N 77.2362044°E
- Country: India
- State: Madhya Pradesh
- District: Bhopal
- Tehsil: Huzur
- Elevation: 517 m (1,696 ft)

Population (2011)
  - Total: 1,765
- Time zone: UTC+5:30 (IST)
- ISO 3166 code: MP-IN
- 2011 census code: 482496

Teela Khedi is a village in the Bhopal district of Madhya Pradesh, India. It is located in the Huzur tehsil and the Phanda block.

== Demographics ==
According to the 2011 census of India, Teela Khedi has 342 households. The effective literacy rate (i.e. the literacy rate of population excluding children aged 6 and below) is 68.64%.

Demographics (2011 Census)
	Total	Male	Female
Population	1765	908	857
Children aged below 6 years	263	134	129
Scheduled caste	291	153	138
Scheduled tribe	55	32	23
Literates	1031	637	394
Workers (all)	876	494	382
Main workers (total)	439	409	30
Main workers: Cultivators	230	219	11
Main workers: Agricultural labourers	95	87	8
Main workers: Household industry workers	18	17	1
Main workers: Other	96	86	10
Marginal workers (total)	437	85	352
Marginal workers: Cultivators	276	38	238
Marginal workers: Agricultural labourers	118	26	92
Marginal workers: Household industry workers	20	5	15
Marginal workers: Others	23	16	7
Non-workers	889	414	475
