= Third Bhattacharjee ministry =

Government of West Bengal, 2006–2011

- 18th Ministry of West Bengal
- 2006—2011
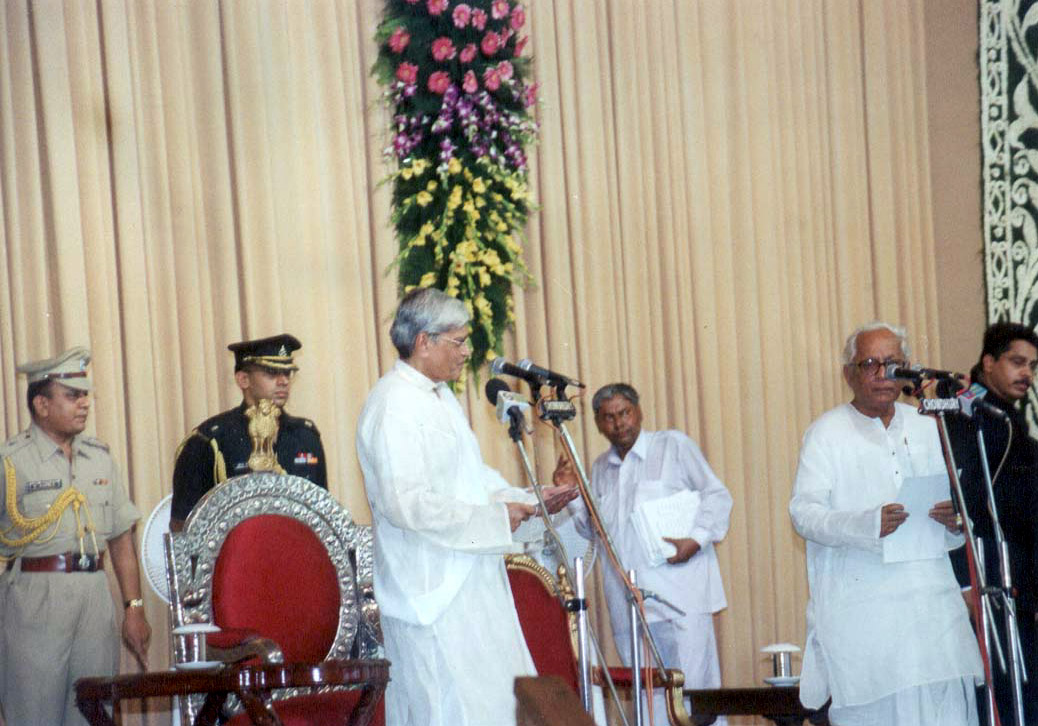
- Chief Minister Buddhadeb Bhattacharjee sworn ceremony with Governor Gopalkrishna Gandhi in Raj Bhavan in 2006
- Date formed: 18 May 2006
- Date dissolved: 19 May 2011

People and organisations
- Governor: Viren J. Shah Gopalkrishna Gandhi Devanand Konwar (additional charge); M. K. Narayanan
- Chief Minister: Buddhadeb Bhattacharjee
- No. of ministers: Cabinet Ministers; Minister of state (I/C) (Note: I/C stands for independent charge. It means that a minister can hold portfolios independently in a junior rank.); Minister of state
- Member party: Left Front
- Status in legislature: Majority
- Opposition party: All India Trinamool Congress
- Opposition leader: Partha Chatterjee

History
- Election: 2006
- Outgoing election: 2011
- Legislature term: 14th Assembly
- Predecessor: Second Bhattacharjee ministry
- Successor: First Banerjee ministry

Members of the Left Front Ministry in the Indian state of West Bengal as in May 2006 were as follows:

== Cabinet ministers ==
S.No	Name	Portrait	Constituency	Assumed office	Left office	Department	Party
1	Buddhadeb Bhattacharjee (Chief Minister)		Jadavpur	18 May 2006	13 May 2011	Home & Hill Affairs; Personnel & Administration; Development & Planning; Minority Affairs; Home (P & R), Science and Technology; Information & Cultural Affairs	CPI(M)
2	Nirupam Sen		Bardhaman Dakshin	18 May 2006	13 May 2011	Commerce & Industries; Public Undertakings; Industrial Reconstruction	CPI(M)
3	Surjya Kanta Mishra		Narayangarh	18 May 2006	13 May 2011	Health & Family Welfare; Panchayats & Rural Development; Bio-technology; ESI	CPI(M)
4	Gautam Deb		Hasnabad	18 May 2006	13 May 2011	Housing; Public Health Engineering	CPI(M)
5	Asim Dasgupta		Khardaha	18 May 2006	13 May 2011	Finance; Excise	CPI(M)
6	Subhas Chakraborty		Belgachia East	18 May 2006	3 August 2009	Transport; Youth Services; Sports	CPI(M)
7	Naren Dey		Chinsurah	18 May 2006	13 May 2011	Agriculture; Consumer Affairs	AIFB
8	Kshiti Goswami		Dhakuria	18 May 2006	13 May 2011	PWD	RSP
9	Nandagopal Bhatacharjee		Dantan	18 May 2006	13 May 2011	Minor Irrigation; Water Investigation & Development	CPI
10	Kiranmoy Nanda		Mugberia	18 May 2006	13 May 2011	Fisheries; Aqua-culture; Harbours	WBSP
11	Pratim Chatterjee		Tarakeswar	18 May 2006	13 May 2011	Fire services; Emergency Services	MFB
12	Partha De		Bankura	18 May 2006	13 May 2011	School Education	CPI(M)
13	Manab Mukherjee		Beleghata	18 May 2006	13 May 2011	Cottage & Small Scale; Tourism	CPI(M)
14	Rekha Goswami		Dum Dum	18 May 2006	13 May 2011	Self-help Group; Self-employment	CPI(M)
15	Ashok Bhattacharya		Siliguri	18 May 2006	13 May 2011	Municipal Affairs; Urban Development; North Bengal Development and Hill affairs; Town & Country planning	CPI(M)
16	Abdur Razzak Molla		Canning Purba	18 May 2006	13 May 2011	Land & Land Reforms	CPI(M)
17	Sailen Sarkar		English Bazar	18 May 2006	13 May 2011	Parliamentary Affairs	CPI(M)
18	Mrinal Banerjee		Durgapur-I	18 May 2006	13 May 2011	Power; Labour	CPI(M)
19	Biswanath Chowdhury		Balurghat	18 May 2006	13 May 2011	Jail; Child & Women Development; Social Welfare	RSP
20	Rabindra Ghosh		Uluberia	18 May 2006	13 May 2011	Co-operation	AIFB
21	Jogesh Chandra Barman		Falakata	18 May 2006	13 May 2011	Backward Classes Welfare	CPI(M)
22	Anisur Rahman		Domkal	18 May 2006	13 May 2011	Animal Resources Development	CPI(M)
23	Debesh Das		Taltola	18 May 2006	13 May 2011	Information Technology	CPI(M)

- Prof. Sudarshan Roy Choudhury - Higher Education
- Ananta Roy Barman – Forests
- Paresh Chandra Adhikari - Food and Supplies Department
- Robilal Moitra - Judicial and Law Department
- Chakradhar Meikap - Technical Education
- Subhas Naskar - Irrigation, Waterways
- Kanti Ganguly - Sunderbans Development Affairs
- Susanta Ghosh - Paschimanchal Unnayan Affairs
- Mohanta Chatterjee – Environment
- Dr Mortoza Hossein - Relief, Agricultural Marketing

== Ministers of State ==
- Deblina Hembram - MOS Backward Classes Welfare
- Manohar Tirkey - MOS PWD
- Srikumar Mukherjee - MOS Home, Civil Defence
- Bilashibala Sahis - MOS Forests
- Narayan Biswas - MOS Cottage & Small Scale Industries
- Abdus Sattar - MOS Minorities Development, Welfare, Madrasah
- Bankim Chandra Ghosh - MOS Panchayat & Rural Development
- Anwarul Haque - MOS Public Health engineering
- Binay Krishna Biswas - MOS Refugee relief & Rehabilitation
- Tapan Roy - MOS Mass Education Extension, Library
- Anadi Kumar Sahu - MOS Labour
