= Second Bhattacharjee ministry =

2001–06 government of West Bengal, India

- 17th Ministry of West Bengal
- 2001—2006
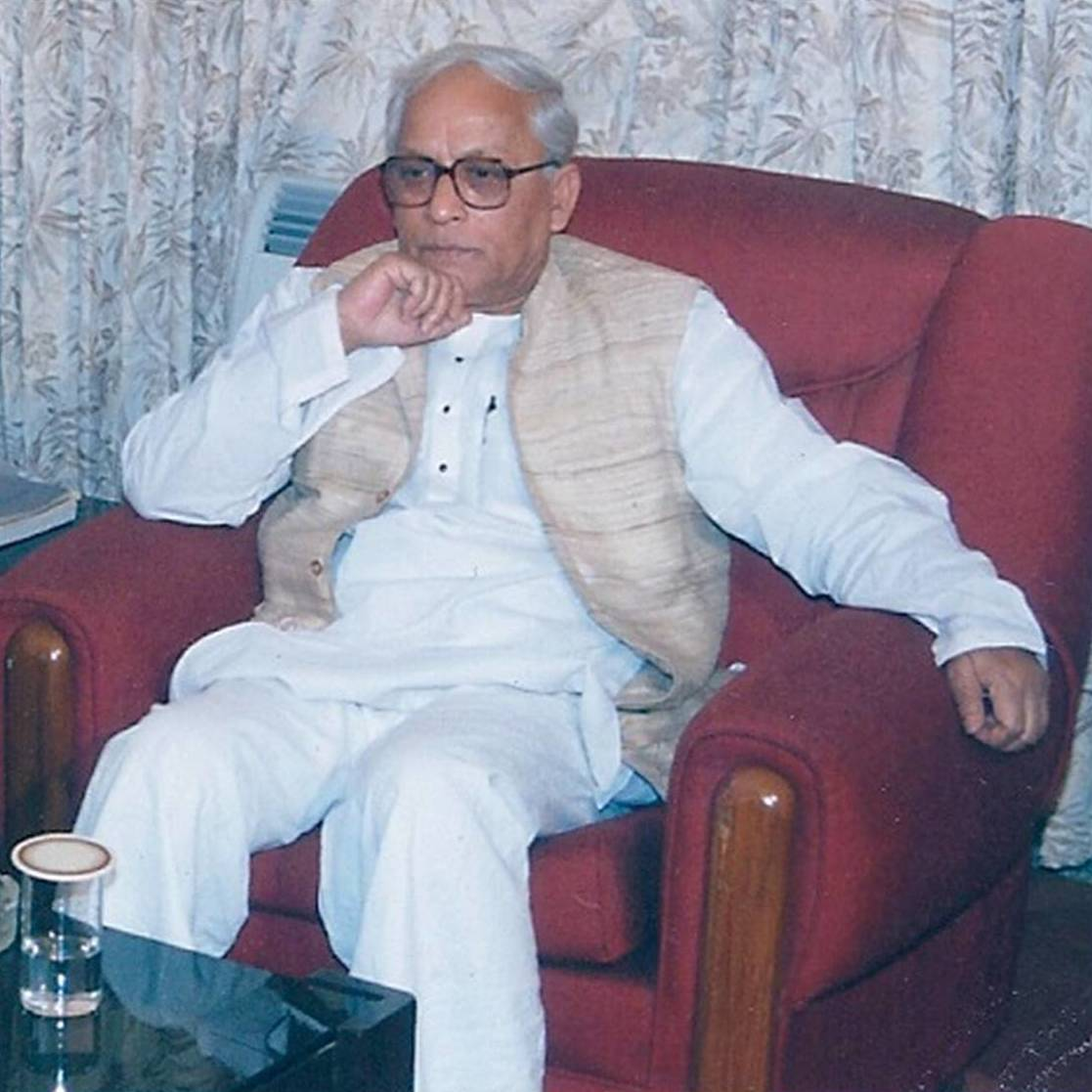
- Date formed: 15 May 2001
- Date dissolved: 17 May 2006

People and organisations
- Governor: Viren J. Shah Gopalkrishna Gandhi
- Chief Minister: Buddhadeb Bhattacharjee
- No. of ministers: Cabinet Ministers; Minister of state (I/C) (Note: I/C stands for independent charge. It means that a minister can hold portfolios independently in a junior rank.); Minister of state
- Member party: Left Front
- Status in legislature: Majority
- Opposition party: All India Trinamool Congress
- Opposition leader: Pankaj Kumar Banerjee

History
- Election: 2001
- Outgoing election: 2006
- Legislature term: 13th Assembly
- Predecessor: First Bhattacharjee ministry
- Successor: Third Bhattacharjee ministry

Buddhadev Bhattacharya was sworn in as the chief minister of West Bengal in the sixth Left Front government along with other 47 ministers. Members of the Left Front Ministry in the Indian state of West Bengal as in May 2006 were as follows:

== Council of Ministers ==
Name	Office	Portfolio	Took Office	Left Office	Party
Buddhadeb Bhattacharjee	Chief Minister	Home (Police); Information and Cultural Affairs; Science and Technology	15 May 2001	17 May 2006	Left Front
Nirupam Sen	Cabinet Minister	Industry; Public Undertakings & Industrial Reconstruction; Planning & Development	15 May 2001	17 May 2006	Left Front
Dr Surjya Kanta Mishra	Cabinet Minister	Health & Family welfare; Rural Development; Panchayat	15 May 2001	17 May 2006	Left Front
Mohammed Amin	Cabinet Minister	Labour	15 May 2001	17 May 2006	Left Front
Asim Dasgupta	Cabinet Minister	Finance	15 May 2001	17 May 2006	Left Front
Subhas Chakraborty	Cabinet Minister	Transport; Sports; Hooghly River Bridge Commissioners	15 May 2001	17 May 2006	Left Front
Mohammed Salim	Cabinet Minister	Minorities Development & Welfare; Self-employment Scheme for the Urban Unemployed; Youth Services; Technical Education	15 May 2001	17 May 2006	Left Front
Kamal Guha	Cabinet Minister	Agriculture	15 May 2001	17 May 2006	Left Front
Biswanath Chowdhury	Cabinet Minister	Social Welfare; Jails	15 May 2001	17 May 2006	Left Front
Kiranmoy Nanda	Cabinet Minister	Fisheries; Aquaculture; Aquatic Resources; Harbours	15 May 2001	17 May 2006	Left Front
Nandagopal Bhattacharjee	Cabinet Minister	Small Irrigation; Water Investigation Development	15 May 2001	17 May 2006	Left Front
Prabodh Sinha	Cabinet Minister	Parliamentary Affairs & Excise	15 May 2001	17 May 2006	Left Front
Kalimuddin Shams	Cabinet Minister	Food & Supplies	15 May 2001	17 May 2006	Left Front
Amar Chaudhuri	Cabinet Minister	Public Works	15 May 2001	17 May 2006	Left Front
Gautam Deb	Cabinet Minister	Housing; Public Health and Engineering	15 May 2001	17 May 2006	Left Front
Kanti Biswas	Cabinet Minister	School Education; Madrasah	15 May 2001	17 May 2006	Left Front
Naren De	Cabinet Minister	Cooperation & Consumer Affairs	15 May 2001	17 May 2006	Left Front
Manabendra Mukherjee	Cabinet Minister	Information Technology & Environment	15 May 2001	17 May 2006	Left Front
Ashok Bhattacharya	Cabinet Minister	Municipal Affairs; Urban Development; Town and Country Planning	15 May 2001	17 May 2006	Left Front
Dinesh Chandra Dakua	Cabinet Minister	Tourism	15 May 2001	17 May 2006	Left Front
Sailen Sarkar	Cabinet Minister	Food Processing and Horticulture	15 May 2001	17 May 2006	Left Front
Satyasadhan Chakravarty	Cabinet Minister	Higher Education	15 May 2001	17 May 2006	Left Front
Amarendralal Roy	Cabinet Minister	Irrigation and Waterways	15 May 2001	17 May 2006	Left Front
Abdur Razzak Molla	Cabinet Minister	Land and Land Reforms	15 May 2001	17 May 2006	Left Front
Mrinal Banerjee	Cabinet Minister	Power	15 May 2001	17 May 2006	Left Front
Bansa Gopal Chowdhury	Cabinet Minister	Cottage & Small Scale Industry	15 May 2001	17 May 2006	Left Front
Nisith Adhikary	Cabinet Minister	Law and Judicial Department	15 May 2001	17 May 2006	Left Front
Upen Kisku	Cabinet Minister	Scheduled Castes; Scheduled Tribes; Other Backward Classes Welfare	15 May 2001	17 May 2006	Left Front
Anisur Rahman	Cabinet Minister	Animal Resources Development	15 May 2001	17 May 2006	Left Front
Jogesh Chandra Barman	Cabinet Minister	Forests	15 May 2001	17 May 2006	Left Front
Nemai Mal	Cabinet Minister	Library Services	15 May 2001	17 May 2006	Left Front
Nandarani Dal	Cabinet Minister	Mass Education	15 May 2001	17 May 2006	Left Front
Chhaya Ghosh	Cabinet Minister	Agriculture Marketing	15 May 2001	17 May 2006	Left Front
Hafiz Alam Sairani	Cabinet Minister	Relief	15 May 2001	17 May 2006	Left Front
Pratim Chatterjee	Minister of State	Fire Services	15 May 2001	17 May 2006	Left Front
Dhiren Sen	Minister of State	Land and Land Reforms; Panchayats and Rural Development	15 May 2001	17 May 2006	Left Front
Susanta Ghosh	Minister of State	Labour; Employment Exchange; Employees’ State Insurance (ESI)	15 May 2001	17 May 2006	Left Front
Dasrath Tirkey	Minister of State	Public Works	15 May 2001	17 May 2006	Left Front
Maheswar Murmu	Minister of State	Pashchimanchal Development; Forests	15 May 2001	17 May 2006	Left Front
Anju Kar	Minister of State	Municipal Affairs	15 May 2001	17 May 2006	Left Front
Bilasibala Sahis	Minister of State	Scheduled Castes; Scheduled Tribes; OBC	15 May 2001	17 May 2006	Left Front
Ganesh Chandra Mondal	Minister of State	Irrigation & Waterways	15 May 2001	17 May 2006	Left Front
Srikumar Mukherjee	Minister of State	Civil Defence	15 May 2001	17 May 2006	Left Front
Kanti Ganguly	Minister of State	Sunderbans Development Affairs	15 May 2001	17 May 2006	Left Front
Pratyush Mukherjee	Minister of State	Health & Family Welfare	15 May 2001	17 May 2006	Left Front
Narayan Biswas	Minister of State	Transport	15 May 2001	17 May 2006	Left Front
Nayan Sarkar	Minister of State	Refugee Rehabilitation	15 May 2001	17 May 2006	Left Front
Ibha Dey	Minister of State	School Education	15 May 2001	17 May 2006	Left Front

== See also ==
- Third Bhattacharjee ministry
- Left Front (West Bengal)
