= Bhattacharjee ministry =

Bhattacharjee ministry may refer to these cabinets headed by Indian politician Buddhadeb Bhattacharjee as chief minister of West Bengal:

- First Bhattacharjee ministry (2000–2001)
- Second Bhattacharjee ministry (2001–2006)
- Third Bhattacharjee ministry (2006–2011)
