= First Bhattacharjee ministry =

2000–01 government of West Bengal, India

- 16th Ministry of West Bengal
- 2000-2001
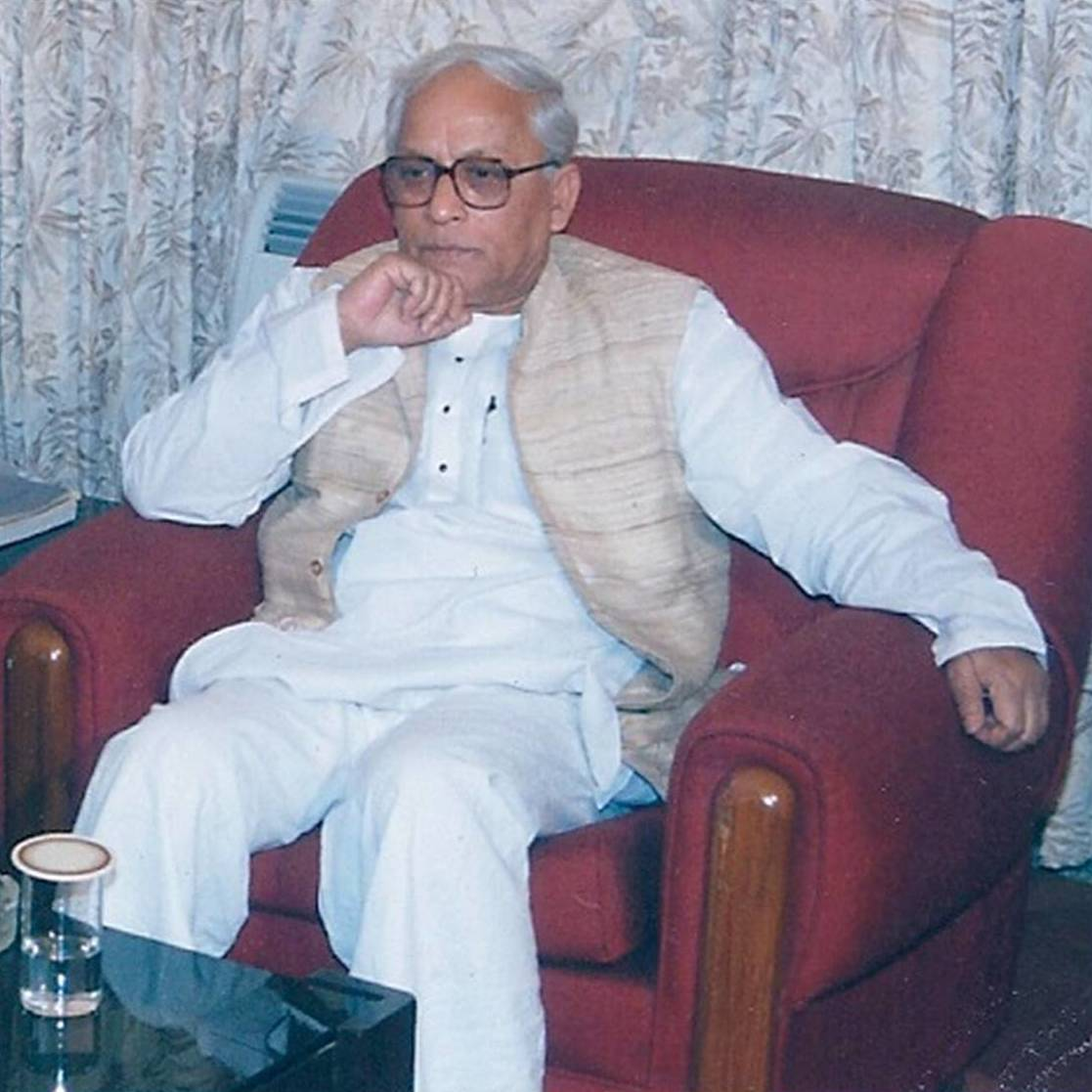
- Date formed: 6 November 2000
- Date dissolved: 14 May 2001

People and organisations
- Governor: Viren J. Shah: Cabinet Ministers; Minister of state (I/C) (Note: I/C stands for independent charge. It means that a minister can hold portfolios independently in a junior rank.); Minister of state
- Chief Minister: Buddhadeb Bhattacharjee
- Member party: Left Front
- Status in legislature: Majority
- Opposition party: Indian National Congress
- Opposition leader: Atish Chandra Sinha

History
- Election: 1996
- Outgoing election: 2001
- Legislature term: 12th Assembly
- Predecessor: Fifth Jyoti Basu ministry
- Successor: Second Bhattacharjee ministry

Buddhadev Bhattacharya was sworn in as the Chief Minister of West Bengal in the fifth Left Front government along with other 45 ministers on 5 November 2000.

== List of Ministers ==
Members of the Left Front Ministry in the Indian state of West Bengal as in November 2000 were as follows:

Council of Ministers
No.	Name	Portfolio
Cabinet Ministers
1	Buddhadeb Bhattacharjee	Chief Minister – Home, Hill Affairs, Information and Cultural Affairs
2	Subhas Chakraborty	Sports, Transport
3	Asim Dasgupta	Finance, Development and Planning, Excise, Self Employment Generation Programme (Urban)
4	Mohammed Amin	Employment Exchange, Minority Development and Welfare, Wakf and Urdu Academy and Haj
5	Dr. Surjya Kanta Mishra	Land and Land Reforms, Panchayats and Rural Development
6	Kiranmay Nanda	Fisheries
7	Satyaranjan Mahata	Relief
8	Gautam Deb	Housing, Public Health Engineering
9	Partha De	Health and Family Welfare
10	Santi Ranjan Ghatak	Labour
11	Abdur Razzak Molla	Food Processing Industries, Horticulture, Sundarban Affairs
12	Kshiti Goswami	Public Works
13	Kanti Biswas	School Education, Madrasah Education, Refugee, Relief and Rehabilitation
14	Kalimuddin Shams	Food and Supplies
15	Ashok Bhattacharya	Urban Development, Municipal Affairs, Town and Country Planning, Hooghly River Bridge Commission
16	Anisur Rahman	Animal Resources Development
17	Nanda Gopal Bhattacharjee	Water Resources Investigation and Development
18	Mrinal Banerjee	Power, Industrial Reconstruction, Public Undertakings, Science and Technology
19	Chhaya Bera	Employees State Insurance, Employment Exchange, Self Employment Generation Programme (Rural)
20	Birendra Kumar Moitra	Agricultural Marketing
21	Bhakti Bhusan Mandal	Co-operation
22	Dinesh Chandra Dakua	Backward Classes Welfare
23	Pralay Talukdar	Cottage and Small Scale Industries
24	Prof. Prabodh Chandra Sinha	Parliamentary Affairs
25	Biswanath Chowdhury	Jails, Social Welfare
26	Debabrata Bandapadhyay	Irrigation and Waterways
27	Manabendra Mukherjee	Environment, Tourism, Youth Services
28	Naren Dey	Agriculture, Consumer Affairs
29	Satya Sadhan Chakraborty	Higher Education
30	Bidyut Ganguly	Commerce and Industries
31	Dr. Sankar Sen	Power, Science and Technology
32	Jogesh Chandra Barman	Forests
33	Nisith Adhikary	Judicial, Law
Ministers of State
1	Manohar Tirkey	Public Works
2	Upen Kisku	Backward Classes Welfare
3	Kamalendu Sanyal	Land and Land Reforms, Panchayats and Rural Development
4	Bilasi Bala Sahis	Forests
5	Srikumar Mukherjee	Civil Defence
6	Pratim Chatterjee	Fire Services
7	Nimai Mal	Library Services
8	Susanta Ghosh	Transport
9	Dhiren Sen	Excise
10	Ganesh Chandra Mondal	Irrigation and Waterways
11	Maheswar Murmu	Special Tribal Areas Development including Jhargram Affairs
12	Anju Kar	Mass Education Extension
13	Minati Ghosh	Health and Family Welfare

== See also ==
- Second Bhattacharjee ministry
- Left Front (West Bengal)
