= Buddhadeb Bhattacharjee ministry =

Buddhadeb Bhattacharjee ministry may refer to these cabinets headed by Indian politician Buddhadeb Bhattacharjee as chief minister of West Bengal:

- First Buddhadeb Bhattacharjee ministry (2000–2005)
- Second Buddhadeb Bhattacharjee ministry (2005–2010)
- Third Buddhadeb Bhattacharjee ministry (2010–2011)
