= Dipak Sarkar =

Communist Indian Politician

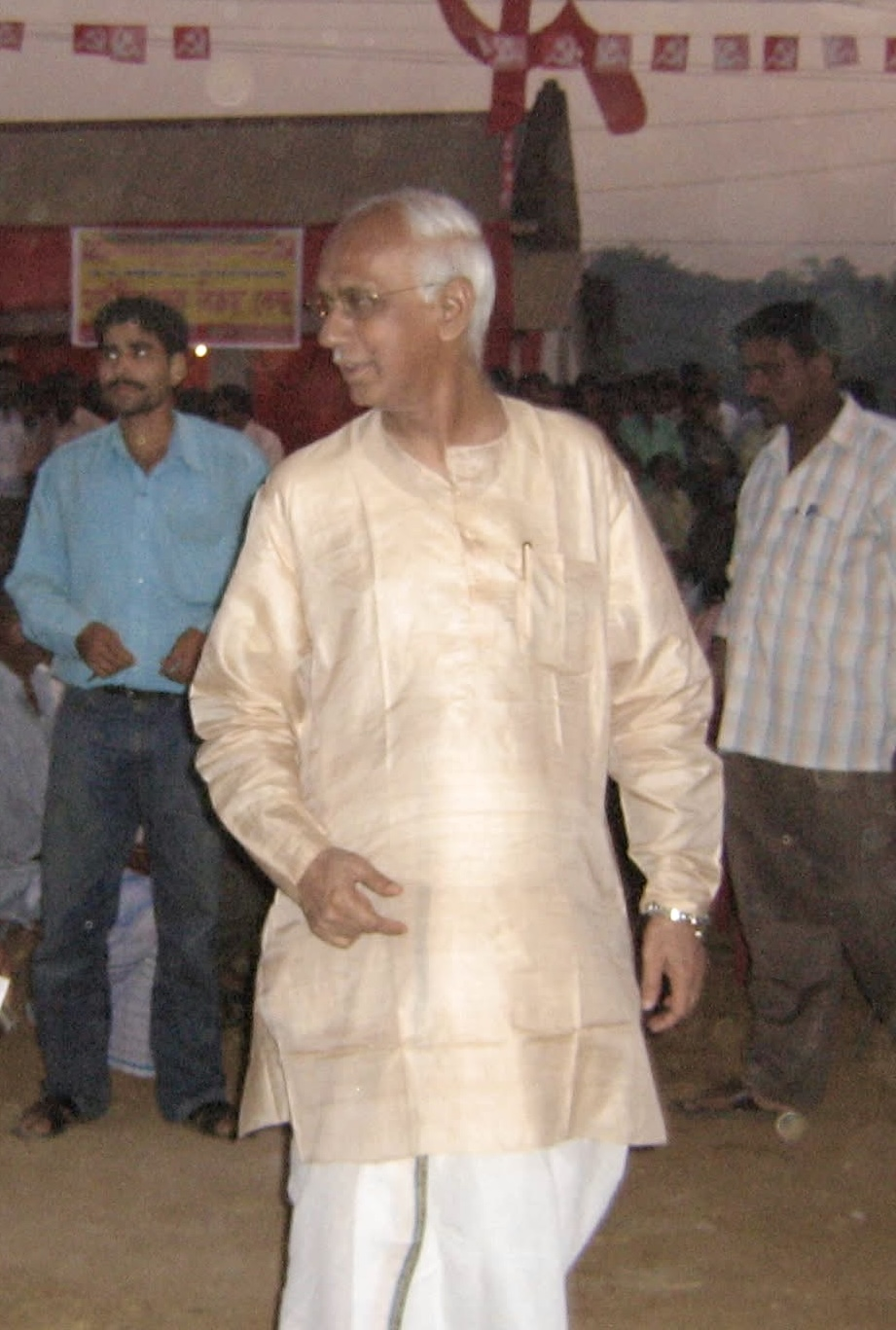
- CPI(M) Leader Dipak Sarkar
- Born: 1940; Midnapore, West Bengal
- Died: October 13, 2025 (aged 84–85); Midnapore, West Bengal
- Citizenship: Indian
- Political party: Communist Party of India (Marxist)

Dipak Sarkar (1940 – October 13, 2025) was a veteran Indian trade unionist and Communist leader from Midnapore, West Bengal who served as a member of the All India Working Committee of the Centre of Indian Trade Unions and the State Secretariat of the Communist Party of India (Marxist).

A professor of politics at the Midnapore College, Sarkar became the District Secretary of undivided Midnapore in 1992 and was an instrumental figure in leading the counter-insurgency against Naxalite–Maoist insurgency in the Junglemahal region. Under his leadership, the Communist government under Buddhadeb Bhattacharjee wrested Lalgarh from Maoists as part of the Operation Lalgarh in 2009.

== Personal life ==
Sarkar was born in 1940 in Midnapore, West Bengal, and joined the Communist Party of India (Marxist) in the 1960s. He died at his residence in Biddhannagar, Midnapore, on October 13, 2025, at the age of 85. Sarkar's body was donated to the Midnapore Medical College, an institution he had helped establish during his political career. During his lifetime, Sarkar wielded absolute authority over local law enforcement and government in much of Southwestern Bengal, and alongside his aide and CPI(M) minister Susanta Ghosh, was characterised as the Beriaite czar of Midnapore.

Mohammed Salim, Susanta Ghosh, and Surjya Kanta Mishra were among his contemporaries who attended his final ceremony, which also included leaders from the Trinamool Congress and the Bengal Bharatiya Janata Party.

== Career and Controversies ==
In his political career, Sarkar was instrumental in the establishment of the Midnapore Medical College, Sports Development Authority, the Vidyasagar Institute of Health, and other institutions in and around the Midnapore district. Until his death, he remained the chairman of the governing body of the Vidyasagar Institute of Health and was one of the patrons of the Vidyasagar Shishu Niketan, the first local school affiliated with Council for the Indian School Certificate Examinations.

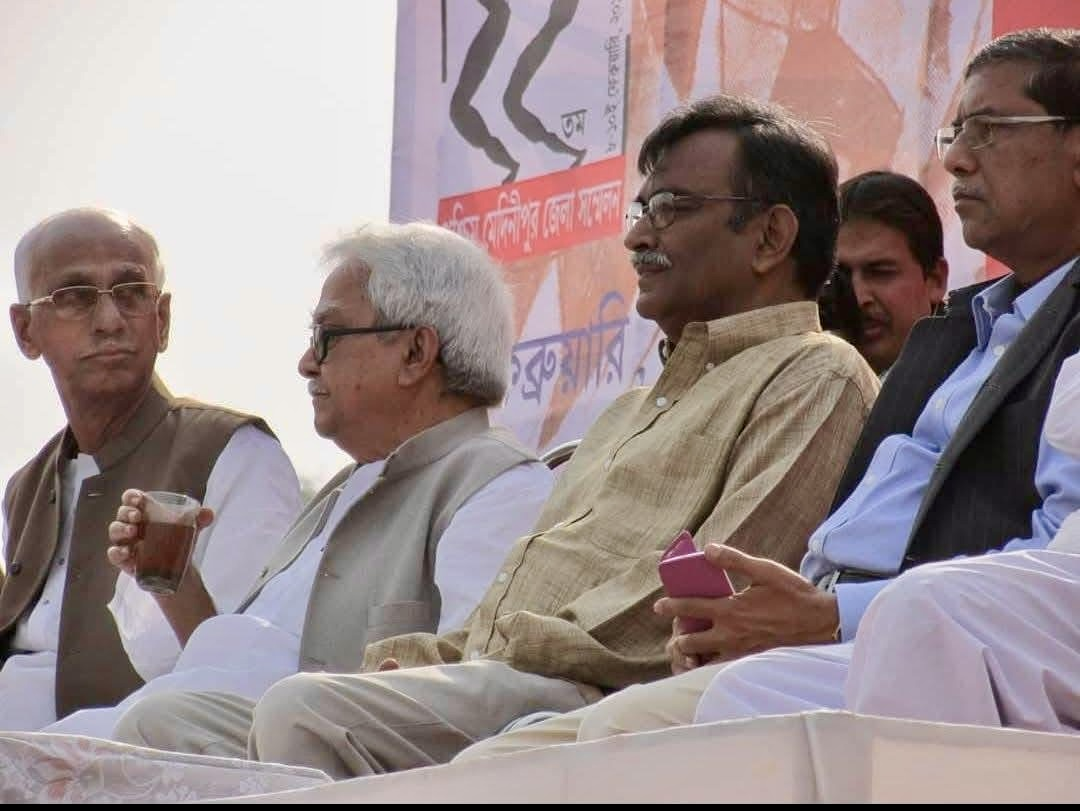
Sarkar, seen here with Biman Bose and Surjya Kanta Mishra

Sarkar retired from the State Secretariat in 2022 and continued as an advisor. He was seen as a political patron for the controversial Bengal minister Susanta Ghosh, when Sarkar confronted Anil Biswas regarding the inclusion of Ghosh in the secretariat. Considered one of the most powerful political figures in Bengal, Sarkar was frequently targeted by Naxal leaders like Kishenji who named him alongside Lakshman Seth MP and Anuj Pandey as targets of the insurgents.

In 2010, during the Maoist resistance to a steel plant project by the Jindal Steel conglomerate in West Midnapore's Salboni region, Sarkar helped organise the Harmath militia to counter the insurgents. Later, after the Home Minister of India P. Chidambaram wrote to Chief Minister Buddhadeb Bhattacharjee about the internal security of the Lalgarh region, Sarkar worked as an advisor with state cabinet Minister Susanta Ghosh and established the Harmath defence squads in Jungle mahal areas recovered by the Communist government from Maoist insurgents.

In 2016, Chief Minister Mamata Banerjee accused Sarkar, alongside Politburo member Surjya Kanta Mishra, Mohammed Salim, and Susanta Ghosh of murdering democracy for demanding Central Force and electoral observers during the 2016 West Bengal Legislative Assembly election. He was also named and later acquitted in the Nandigram violence.
