= Tarak =

Tarak may refer to:

== Given name ==
- Tarak Ben Ammar (born 1949), Tunisian film producer
- Tarak Bandyopadhyay (1943–2013), Indian politician
- Tarak Chandra Das (1898–1964), Calcutta University anthropologist
- Tarak Nath Das (1884–1958), anti-British Indian revolutionary and internationalist scholar
- Tarak Dhiab (born 1954), Tunisian footballer
- Tarak Nath Ghosal (1854–1934), birth name of Swami Shivananda, Indian Hindu religious leader
- Tarak Jallouz (born 1993), Tunisian handball player
- Tarak Mehta (1929–2017), Indian columnist, humourist, writer, and playwright
- Tarak Mekki (1958–2012), Tunisian businessman and politician
- Tarak Nath Mukherjee, Bengali politician
- Tarak Ramzan (born 1953), British businessman
- Tarak Sinha (1950–2021), Indian cricket coach
- Taraka Ratna (born 1983), known as Tarak, Indian film actor in Telugu cinema
- N. T. Rama Rao Jr. (born 1983), Indian actor, sometimes nicknamed "Tarak"

== Places ==
- A mountain peak in the Mariveles Mountains
- Tarak, Iran, in Fars Province

== Other uses ==
- A comb Kilim motifs, symbolising marriage
- Tarak (film), a 2017 Indian Kannada-language action drama film

== See also ==
- Taarak Mehta (1930–2017), Indian columnist, humorist, writer and playwright
- Taraka (disambiguation), the Sanskrit form of the Hindi name Tarak
- "Tharak", a song by Indian singer Mamta Sharma
