= Paschimbanga Rajya Pratibandhi Sammilani =

- পশ্চিমবঙ্গ রাজ্য প্রতিবন্ধী সম্মিলনী
- Abbreviation: PRPS
- Formation: 1986
- Type: Non-profit organization
- Headquarters: 147, Barakhola, Krishakpally, Mukundapur, Kolkata-700099
- Region served: West Bengal
- General Secretary: Kanti Ganguly
- Website: http://prps.in

Paschimbanga Rajya Pratibandhi Sammilani (PRPS) is the largest disabled people's organization advocating for the rights and welfare of disabled individuals in West Bengal. Established in 1986, PRPS has been instrumental in promoting disability rights and ensuring social inclusion across the state.

== History ==
Paschimbanga Rajya Pratibandhi Sammilani was founded in 1986 under the leadership of Kanti Gangopadhyay. It originated from Dakshin Sahartali Pratibandhi Sammilani (DSPS), initially based in the southern suburbs of Kolkata. The DSPS was formed in 1984. Over the years, PRPS expanded its influence and became a prominent voice for disability rights in West Bengal.
