= Amit Mitra =

Indian politician

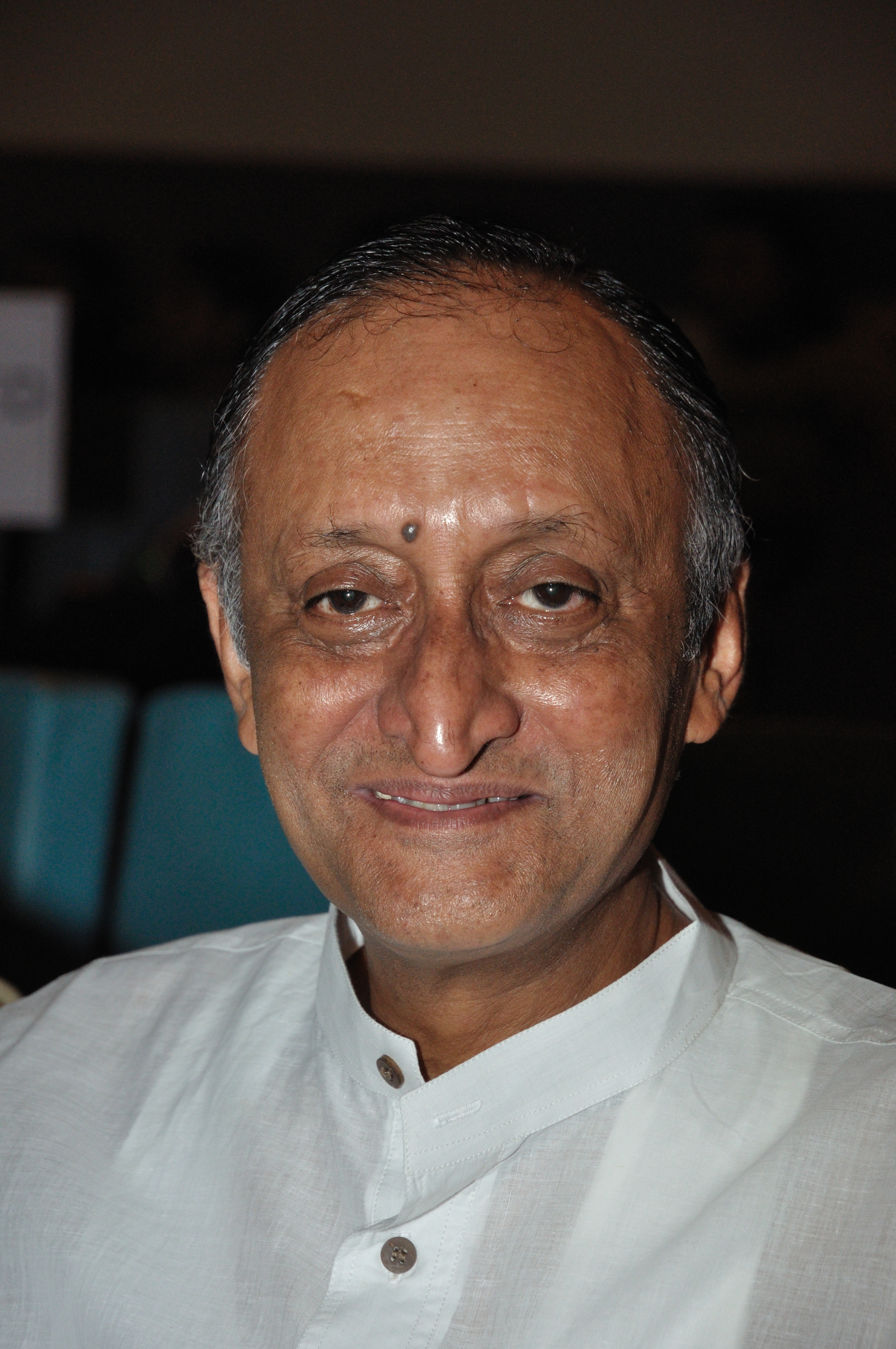
- Mitra in 2011

Cabinet Minister Government of West Bengal
- In office 2011–2021
- Governor: M. K. Narayanan; D. Y. Patil (additional charge); Keshari Nath Tripathi; Jagdeep Dhankhar
- Department: Finance; Planning and Statistics and Programme Monitoring
- Chief Minister: Mamata Banerjee
- Preceded by: Asim Dasgupta (Finance); Tapas Roy (Planning and Statistics and Programme Monitoring); Partha Chatterjee (Public Enterprises and Commerce and Industry); Bratya Basu (Information Technology and Electronics); Shyam Mukherjee (Micro, Small & Medium Enterprise and Textile)
- Succeeded by: Chandrima Bhattacharya (Finance); Partha Chatterjee (Commerce and Industry and Information Technology and Electronics); Subrata Mukherjee ( Public Enterprises and Industrial Reconstruction ); Chandranath Sinha (Micro, Small & Medium Enterprise and Textile); Mamata Banerjee (Finance); Tapas Roy (Planning and Statistics and Programme Monitoring)
- Department: Finance (20 May 2011-9 Nov 2021); Planning and Statistics and Programme Monitoring (10 May 2021-9 Nov 2021); Information Technology and Electronics & e-Governance (2018-2021); Industrial Reconstruction (2014-2021); Public Enterprises (2014-2021); Commerce and Industry (2014-2021); Micro, Small & Medium Enterprise and Textile (2013-2021)

Member of West Bengal Legislative Assembly
- In office 2011–2021
- Preceded by: Asim Dasgupta
- Succeeded by: Kajal Sinha (posthumously)
- Constituency: Khardaha

Principal Advisor Chief Minister of West Bengal
- In office 10 November 2021 – 4 May 2026

Personal details
- Born: 20 December 1947 (age 78) Calcutta, West Bengal, India
- Party: Trinamool Congress
- Spouse: Meera Balakrishnan
- Children: 1 daughter
- Relatives: Bela Mitra (mother); Haridas Mitra (father)
- Education: Presidency University, Kolkata (B.A.); University of Delhi (M.A.); Duke University (Ph.D.)
- Occupation: Economist; Politician

Dr. Amit Mitra is an Indian economist and politician who served as Special Advisor to Chief Minister of West Bengal on Finance. Previously, he was the Finance, Commerce & Industries Minister of the government of Indian state of West Bengal. He was the incumbent MLA in the West Bengal state assembly from the Khardaha state assembly constituency. He was referred to as a giant killer in the 2011 West Bengal state assembly election for defeating Asim Dasgupta, the former West Bengal Finance Minister. Mitra previously served as the Secretary general of the Federation of Indian Chambers of Commerce and Industry (FICCI).

== Family ==
Son of Haridas Mitra, an independence activist and former Deputy Speaker of the West Bengal Legislative Assembly and Bela Mitra. His maternal grandfather was Suresh Chandra Bose, elder brother of Netaji Subhas Chandra Bose. Both Suresh Chandra Bose and Haridas Mitra were part of the secret service team of Azad Hind Fauj. Bela Mitra took charge of the secret service of Azad Hind Fauj from Haridas Mitra. Belanagar railway station in Howrah district on the Howrah-Bardhaman chord line, is named after her.

== Education ==
Mitra went to Calcutta Boys' School and graduated from Presidency College when it was an affiliate of the University of Calcutta with a degree in Economics. He was a notable debater in West Bengal inter-college debate competitions. Mitra received a Masters from the Delhi School of Economics, University of Delhi and, in 1978, a PhD from Duke University in the USA. Mitra is included in Duke University's list of distinguished alumni.

== Early career ==
He taught at Duke University and Franklin & Marshall College for over a decade before returning to India. He received the prestigious Sears-Roebuck Foundation Award for Distinguished Teaching, 1990.

He joined the Federation of Indian Chambers of Commerce and Industry and rose to be its secretary-general. He resigned as secretary-general of FICCI on 18 May 2011 upon his election as state assembly representative. During his tenure, he transformed FICCI into a professional organisation to research and formulate India's policy during its economic liberalisation. The number of conferences organised by FICCI rose from 10 to 500 between 1994 and 2011 and its revenues saw an increase from Rs 3 crore to Rs 110 crore during the period Dr. Mitra presided over its activities.

He served as an Additional Director of Steel Authority of India Ltd from 25 March 2003 to 24 March 2006. At the request of Mamata Banerjee, the railway minister, he headed a panel to draw up business plans for the public-private partnership projects of the railways. He has been on the government's advisory committee on the World Trade Organization and the National Manufacturing Competitiveness Council. He was associated with Planning Commission as a member of the expert group on equitable development.

== Political career ==
Amit Mitra joined All India Trinamool Congress on the invitation of Mamata Banerjee and contested during the state assembly election of 2011 from the Khardaha state assembly constituency. He was attributed a giant killer after the election as he defeated state Finance Minister Asim Dasgupta by a margin of 26,154 votes. Asim Dasgupta was elected from the Khardaha constituency previously five times in a row during the state assembly elections of 1987, 1991, 1996, 2001 and 2006.

Amit Mitra was sworn in as a minister on 20 May 2011 and was given the Finance and Excise portfolio.

Amit Mitra has opined that the 'minimal capital expenditure' made over a long period by the state government has led to the state of bankruptcy. He feels that the state's financial condition can be improved with a flow of investments and expansion of the state's existing industrial units.

== Awards ==
Amit Mitra is a Padma Shree Award recipient from Government of India in 2008. He was awarded the 'Order of the Rising Sun' in 2005 by His Majesty the Emperor of Japan, Mitra's contribution towards promotion of friendly relations between India and Japan. He is also the recipient of highest civilian Awards conferred by President of the Republic of Italy in 2007.
