= Khokan Das =

Indian politician

Former Member of the West Bengal Assembly
- In office 2 May 2021 – 7 May 2026
- Preceded by: Rabi Ranjan Chattopadhyay
- Succeeded by: Moumita Biswas Mishra
- Constituency: Bardhaman Dakshin

Personal details
- Born: Barddhaman
- Party: All India Trinamool Congress
- Spouse: Mausumi Das
- Education: Maddhyamik Pass
- Profession: Politician,Social Worker

Khokan Das is an Indian politician, member of All India Trinamool Congress, and social worker. He was a MLA, elected from the Bardhaman Dakshin constituency in the 2021 West Bengal Legislative Assembly election. He is registered in criminal cases, including charges under the BNS/IPC Sections 436 (arson or explosive attack to destroy property), 452 (house-trespass for assault), 149 (offence committed by an unlawful assembly),

== Controversies ==
=== Support to illegal Bangladeshis ===
He was involved in a major controversy when he openly asked party workers to ensure that only those Bangladeshi immigrants who support the ruling party in the state find a place in the voters’ list.

He said "Many new people are coming...they are from Bangladesh. Many of these people vote for BJP based on Hindu sentiments. Please ensure that only those who support our party get place in the voters' list."

=== Allegation of fraud jobs by CPM ===
He alleged that the illegal recruitment scheme is something that the leftists have taught them. He said "Throughout the 34 years of the leftist government, there was no law and order in Bengal. By placing their spouses in illegal jobs everywhere, CPM leaders went to join the party."

=== Arrest ===
He gets arrested on 31st May, 2026 from Prayagraj, Uttar Pradesh.
