= Ganesh Ghosh =

Indian politician (1900–1994)

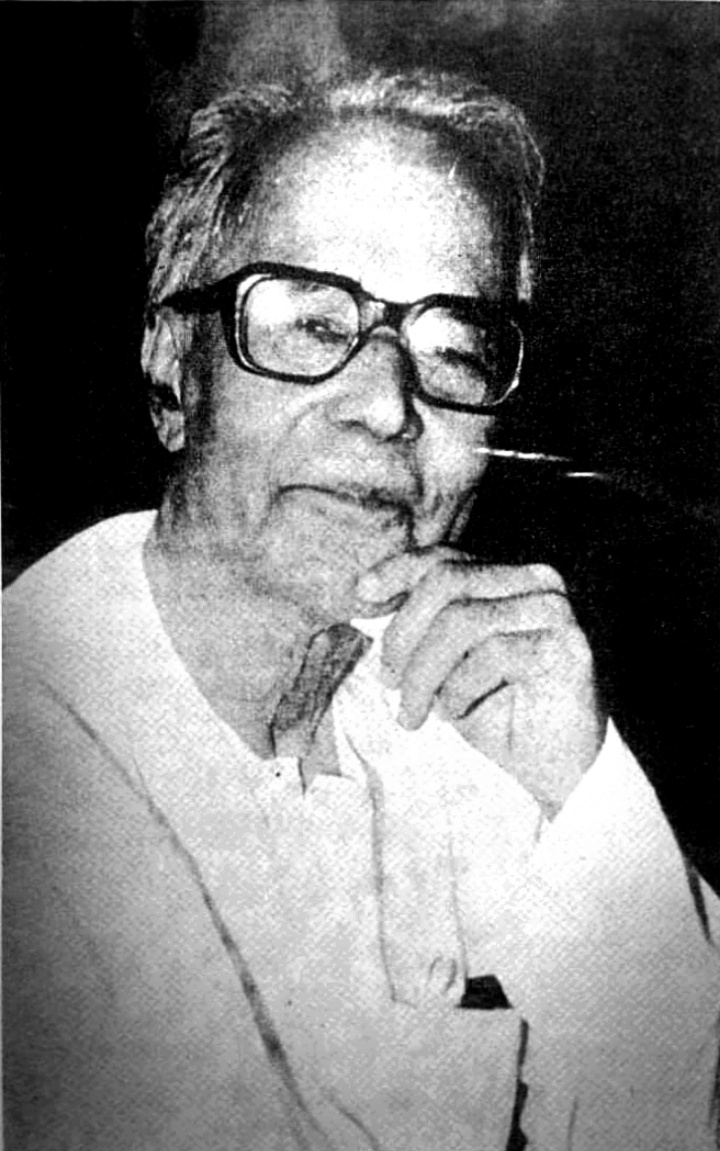

Member of Parliament, Lok Sabha
- In office 1967-1971
- Preceded by: Ranendranath Sen
- Succeeded by: Priya Ranjan Dasmunsi
- Constituency: Calcutta South

MLA
- In office 1951–1967
- Preceded by: New Seat
- Succeeded by: Lakshmi Charan Sen
- Constituency: Belgachia

Personal details
- Born: 22 June 1900 Magura subdivision, Bengal Presidency, British India
- Died: 16 October 1994 (aged 94) Calcutta, West Bengal, India
- Party: Communist Party of India (Marxist); Communist Party of India

Ganesh Ghosh (22 June 1900 – 16 October 1994) was an Indian independence activist, revolutionary, and politician.

== Biography ==
Ganesh Ghosh was born into a Bengali Kayastha family from Binodpur, now in Magura District, Bangladesh. In 1922, he took admission to the Bengal Technical Institute in Calcutta. Later, he became a member of the Chittagong Jugantar party. He participated in the Chittagong armoury raid, along with Surya Sen and other revolutionaries, on 18 April 1930. He fled from Chittagong and took shelter in Chandannagar, Hooghly. After a few days, police commissioner Charles Tegart attacked the safe house of them in Chandannagar and arrested him. One young fellow revolutionary, Jiban Ghoshal, alias Makhan, was killed by the police at the time of the arrest operation.

After the trial, Ganesh Ghosh was deported to the Cellular Jail in Port Blair in 1932. After his release from jail in 1946, he joined communist politics and became a member of the Communist Party of India. After the independence, he became a leader of the party. After the split in the Communist Party of India in 1964, Ganesh sided with the Communist Party of India (Marxist). He was elected to the West Bengal Legislative Assembly in 1952, 1957, and 1962 as a Communist Party of India candidate from Belgachia. He was elected to the 4th Lok Sabha in 1967 from the Calcutta South Lok Sabha constituency as a Communist Party of India (Marxist) candidate. In the 1971 Lok Sabha, he was again the Communist Party of India (Marxist) candidate from the Calcutta South Lok Sabha constituency. This time he was defeated by 26-year-old Priya Ranjan Dash Munshi, who won his first Lok Sabha election, fighting on the Congress (R) ticket.
