= Moumita Biswas Mishra =

Indian politician (born 1984)

Minister of State at industries,commerce and enterprises, Minister of State at Science and Technology and Biotechnology, Government of West Bengal
- Incumbent
- Assumed office 1 June 2026
- Governor: R. N. Ravi
- Chief Minister: Suvendu Adhikari

Member of the West Bengal Legislative Assembly
- Incumbent
- Assumed office 4 May 2026
- Preceded by: Khokan Das
- Constituency: Bardhaman Dakshin

Personal details
- Party: Bharatiya Janata Party
- Profession: Politician, Lawyer

Moumita Biswas Misra (born 1984) is an Indian politician and lawyer from Bardhaman, West Bengal. She is a member of the West Bengal Legislative Assembly from the Bardhaman Dakshin constituency in Purba Bardhaman district, representing the Bharatiya Janata Party. She is currently serving as the Minister of State at industries,commerce and enterprises, Minister of State at Science and Technology and Biotechnology in the Government of West Bengal.

== Early life and education ==
Misra is a resident of Bardhaman North. She completed her MA from Rabindra Bharati University, Kolkata, in 2007 and obtained an LLB degree from Balasore Law College, Balasore, Odisha, in 2020. She is a legal practitioner and her husband Dr. Sisir Biswas is in medical service. She declared assets worth ₹4 crore in her affidavit filed before the Election Commission of India.

== Career ==
Misra became an MLA for the first time after winning the Bardhaman Dakshin constituency in the 2026 West Bengal Legislative Assembly election. She polled 1,07,754 votes and defeated her nearest rival, Khokan Das of the All India Trinamool Congress, by a margin of 30,470 votes.
