= Mathurapur Assembly constituency =

Former West Bengal Legislative Assembly constituency

Coordinates: 22.12°N 88.39°E

Mathurapur
- Former constituency No. 123 for the West Bengal Legislative Assembly

Constituency details
- Country: India
- Region: East India
- State: West Bengal
- District: South 24 Parganas
- Lok Sabha constituency: Mathurapur
- Established: 1951
- Abolished: 2011
- Reservation: None

Mathurapur Assembly constituency was a Legislative Assembly constituency of South 24 Parganas district in the Indian State of West Bengal.

== Overview ==
As a consequence of the order of the Delimitation Commission in respect of the Delimitation of constituencies in the West Bengal, Mathurapur Assembly constituency ceases to exist from 2011.

Mathurapur Assembly constituency was a part of Mathurapur (Lok Sabha constituency).

== Members of the Legislative Assembly ==
Election Year	Constituency	Name of M.L.A.	Party affiliation
1952	Mathurapur	Bhusan Chandra Das	Kisan Mazdoor Praja Party
		Brindaban Gayen	Indian National Congress
1957		Bhusan Chandra Das	Indian National Congress
		Brindaban Gayen	Indian National Congress
1962	Mathurapur Dakshin	Bhusan Chandra Das	Indian National Congress
	Mathurapur Uttar	Brindaban Gayen	Indian National Congress
1967	Mathurapur	H.Halder	Bangla Congress
1969		Renupada Halder	Socialist Unity Centre of India (Communist)
1971		Renupada Halder	Socialist Unity Centre of India (Communist)
1972		Birendranath Halder	Indian National Congress
1977		Satya Ranjan Bapuli	Indian National Congress
1982		Satya Ranjan Bapuli	Indian National Congress
1987		Satya Ranjan Bapuli	Indian National Congress
1991		Satya Ranjan Bapuli	Indian National Congress
1996		Satya Ranjan Bapuli	Indian National Congress
2001		Kanti Ganguly	Communist Party of India (Marxist)
2006		Kanti Ganguly	Communist Party of India (Marxist)

== Election results ==
=== Legislative Assembly Elections 1977-2006 ===
In 2006 and 2001, Kanti Ganguly of CPI(M) won the Mathurapur Assembly constituency defeating his nearest rival Satya Ranjan Bapuli of AITC. Satya Ranjan Bapuli of INC won five times in a row defeating Kanti Ganguly of CPI(M) in 1996 and 1991, Brindaban Bhandari of CPI(M) in 1987 and 1982, and Rabin Mondal of SUCI(C) in 1977.

=== Legislative Assembly Elections 1952-1972 ===
Birendranath Halder of INC won in 1972. Renupada Halder of SUCI(C) won in 1971 and 1969. H.Halder of Bangla Congress won in 1967. In 1962, Mathurapur Assembly constituency had two seats. Bhusan Chandra Das of INC won the Mathurapur Dakshin seat and Brindaban Gayen of INC won the Mathurapur Uttar seat. In 1957 and 1952, Mathurapur Assembly constituency was a joint seat. Bhusan Chandra Das and Brindaban Gayen, both of INC won in 1957. Bhusan Chandra Das of KMPP and Brindaban Gayen of INC won in 1952.
