= Kajal Sinha =

Indian politician (1962–2021)

Member-elect of the West Bengal Legislative Assembly for Khardaha
- Died before taking office
- Preceded by: Amit Mitra
- Succeeded by: Sovandeb Chattopadhyay

Personal details
- Born: 1962 Khardaha, North 24 Parganas district, West Bengal
- Died: 26 April 2021 (aged 58–59)
- Party: All India Trinamool Congress

Kajal Sinha (1962 – 26 April 2021) was an Indian politician from West Bengal. He won the 2021 West Bengal Legislative Assembly election representing the All India Trinamool Congress before his death.

== Early life and education ==
Sinha was from Khardaha, North 24 Parganas district, West Bengal. He was the son of late Kumud Ranjan Sinha. He passed Class 12 at Metropolitan Institute in 1978.

== Career ==
Sinha won from Khardaha Assembly constituency representing All India Trinamool Congress in the 2021 West Bengal Legislative Assembly election. He polled 89,807 votes and defeated his nearest rival, Silbhadra Datta of the Bharatiya Janata Party, by a margin of 28,140 votes.

=== Death ===
Sinha died on 26 April 2021 due to COVID-19, a few days before the declartion of results. He is one of the four MLAs who died with the disease. His wife, Nandita Sinha, filed a complaint against the Election Commission of India, for negligence in conducting the elections in multiple phases during the pandemic.
