= Tarka =

Tarka and similar may refer to:

== Arts and entertainment ==
- Tarka (flute), also tharqa, a traditional flute of the Andes
- Tarka (film), a 1988 Kannada language movie
- Tarka the Otter, a 1927 novel by Henry Williamson
  - Tarka the Otter (film), based on the novel
- Taarka, an Oregonian quartet
- The Tarka, an alien race in the video game Sword of the Stars

== People ==
- Taharqa, Nubian pharaoh of the twenty-fifth Dynasty of Egypt
- David Tarka (born 1983), Australian football player
- Wiesław Tarka (born 1964), Polish diplomat
- Tarka Cordell (1968–2008), British musician, writer and record producer

== Places ==
- Tarka, Nigeria, a Local Government Area in Benue State, Nigeria
- Tarka, Niger
- Tarka Line, a railway line in Devon, England
- Tarka Trail, a series of footpaths assembled from former railway lines

== Other uses ==
- Tarka (medication), a brand name for an antihypertensive medication
- Tarka Shastra, a Sanskrit term for the philosophy of logic and reasoning
- Tarka, also tadka or chhaunk, in Indian cuisine

== See also ==
- Taraka (disambiguation)
- Tadka (film), a 2022 Indian Hindi-language romantic comedy film
- Tarka sastra, an Indian science of dialectics, logic and reasoning
