= Taraka =

Taraka, usually derived from Sanskrit tāraka (तारक, "crossing; ferryman; star; eye"), may refer to:

== Hinduism ==
- Taraka mantra, various mantras spoken by Hindus at their deaths
- Tārakāsura, an asura defeated by Skanda
- Taraka (goddess), wife of god Brihaspati
- Tataka, a yaksha-turned-demoness

== People ==
- N. T. Rama Rao (Taraka Rama Rao Nandamuri, 1923-1996), Indian Telugu film veteran actor and politician
- N. T. Rama Rao Jr. (Taraka Rama Rao Nandamuri, Jr.), Indian Telugu film actor; grandson of N. T. Rama Rao
- Taraka Ratna (Taraka Ratna Nandamuri), Indian Telugu film actor; grandson of N. T. Rama Rao

== Other uses ==
- Taraka, Lanao del Sur, a municipality in the Philippines.
- Taraka, Papua New Guinea, a suburb of Lae in the Morobe Province, Papua New Guinea
- Taraka (butterfly), a genus of butterflies

== See also ==
- Tarak (disambiguation), the Hindi form of the Sanskrit name Taraka
- Tarka (disambiguation)
