= Rekha Goswami =

Indian politician

Rekha Goswami is an Indian politician from West Bengal belonging to Communist Party of India (Marxist). She served as a member of West Bengal Legislative Assembly from 2006 to 2011 representing Dum Dum Assembly constituency. She was also Minister of Self Help Group and Self Employment Department in seventh Left Front Government in West Bengal. Currently she is a member of Central Committee of the party since 9 April 2012.

== Electoral performance ==
=== 2006 ===
2006 West Bengal state assembly election: Dum Dum constituency
Party	Candidate	Votes	%	±%
CPI(M)	Rekha Goswami	99,054	57.50	+14.72#
AITC	Udayan Namboodiry	68,816	37.95	−16.01
INC	Ahindra Majumder (Ahin)	11,541	2.63	
BSP	Sudhir Deb Barma	2,380	1.02	
JMM	Partha Sarathi Dasgupta	1,770	0.90	
Turnout		161,095	81.22	

=== 2011 ===
2011 West Bengal Legislative Assembly election: Dum Dum Uttar:
Party	Candidate	Votes	%	±%
AITC	Chandrima Bhattacharya	94,678	53.43	
CPI(M)	Rekha Goswami	75,650	42.69	
BJP	Chandan Roy	4,741	2.68	
BSP	Naresh Chandra Barui	2,144	1.20	
Majority		19,026	10.74	
Turnout		1,77,320	86.82	
