= Bela Mitra =

Bengali revolutionary (1920–1952)

- Born: Amita Bose; 1920; Kodalia, 24 Parganas, British India
- Died: 31 July 1952 (aged 31–32)
- Other name: Bela Bose
- Organization(s): Rani of Jhansi Regiment, Indian National Army
- Movement: Indian Independence Movement
- Spouse: Haridas Mitra (1936–1952; her death)
- Children: Amit Mitra
- Relatives: Suresh Bose (father); Subhas Chandra Bose (uncle)

Bela Mitra, née Bose (1920 – 31 July 1952) was a Bengali revolutionary involved with the Jhansi Rani Regiment, the Women's Regiment of the Indian National Army, and a social worker.

== Family ==
Mitra was born as Amita or Bela Bose in Kolkata in British India. Her father was Suresh Chandra Bose, the elder brother of Subhas Chandra Bose. She married freedom fighter Haridas Mitra in 1936. Haridas later became the deputy Speaker of West Bengal Assembly. Their son Amit Mitra is an economist and served as the Special Advisor on Finance to the Chief Minister of West Bengal and as the Finance Minister of West Bengal.

== Activities ==
Mitra took active part in anti-British movement since 1940 while Subhas Chandra Bose left Ramgarh Session of the Indian National Congress. Her husband Haridas Mitra was a member of secret service team of Azad Hind Fauj. Smt. Mitra joined in Indian National Army and worked in Jhansi Rani Brigade. She gave shelters to the revolutionaries came outside of India, operated transmitter of Azad Hind Radio and sent information to Singapore from Kolkata since January to October in 1944. When her husband Haridas Mitra was arrested and sentenced to death on 21 June 1945, she went to Poona, and prayed to Mahatma Gandhi to pursue for her husband's acquittal to the British Government. Gandhi wrote letters to the then Viceroy of India, Lord Wavell to commute the death sentence, and subsequently Haridas Mitra got released along with three other freedom fighters Jyotish Basu, Amar Singh Gill, and Pabitra Roy. In 1947 Smt. Mitra formed a social organisation, Jhansir Rani Relief Team. In 1950 she started worked in Abhaynagar near Dankuni for the development of refugees came from East Pakistan.

== Legacy ==
Smt Mitra died in 1952. Belanagar railway station in Howrah district on the Howrah-Bardhaman Chord line, is named after her in 1958. This was the first Railway station in India named after any Indian woman.
