= Haridas Mitra =

Indian independence activist (1914–1992)

Deputy Speaker of the West Bengal Legislative Assembly
- In office 1972–1977
- Preceded by: Narendra Nath Sen
- Succeeded by: Apurba Lal Majumdar
- In office 1967–1968
- Preceded by: Pijush Kanti Mukherjee
- Succeeded by: Kalimuddin Shams

Personal details
- Born: 24 February 1914 Jessore, British Raj
- Died: 20 April 1992 (aged 78)
- Party: All India Forward Bloc (Ruikar); Praja Socialist Party; Indian National Congress
- Spouse: Amita (Bela) Bose
- Children: 3, including Amit Mitra
- Parent: Jogendra Nath Mitra (father)
- Education: University of Calcutta (MA)
- Occupation: Politician; Joint Managing Director of the Jessore Central Co-operative Bank; Secretary of the Khajuria H.E. School; Trade unionist

Military service
- Allegiance: Indian National Army (INA)
- Branch/service: INA secret service
- Years of service: c. 1944
- Battles/wars: World War II

Haridas Mitra (24 February 1914 – 20 April 1992) was an Indian independence activist, politician, spy, trade unionist and educator. He was an organiser of the secret service of the Indian National Army during World War II and was sentenced to death by the British authorities. After Independence he was elected multiple times to the West Bengal Legislative Assembly. He served as the Deputy Speaker of the West Bengal Legislative Assembly in 1967–1968 and in 1972–1977.

== Biography ==
Haridas Mitra was born in Jessore on 24 February 1914 to Jogendra Nath Mitra, an active Indian National Congress worker and member of the Bengal Legislative Council. Haridas Mitra attended the Jessore Zilla School, and later studied at Asutosh College, Vidyasagar College, Vidyasagar College, University Post-Graduate College, and Law College Calcutta in Calcutta. As a student he took part in the 1932 civil disobedience movement, and was imprisoned. He obtained a Master of Arts degree from the University of Calcutta. He was the general secretary of the Vidyasagar College Union between 1933 and 1934, and the general secretary at the Post-Graduate Seminar 1935-1936.

He married Amita (Bela) Bose, the niece of Subhas Chandra Bose. The couple had two daughters and one son (Amit Mitra). Haridas Mitra worked as the Joint Managing Director of the Jessore Central Co-operative Bank between 1939 and 1942. He served as the secretary of the Khajuria H.E. School between 1938 and 1942. He was a founding member of the Jessore College Governing Body in 1940, and remained on its board until 1941. Mitra's career was cut short when he was imprisoned during the 1942 Quit India movement.

Mitra later joined the Indian National Army in 1944, helping to set up its intelligence apparatus inside India. He was arrested by the British authorities. Mitra was sentenced to death in a secret trial. His life was spared only after the direct intervention of Mahatma Gandhi, who convinced the British authorities to commute his death sentence to life imprisonment. After the establishment of the Interim Government of India, Mitra was unconditionally released in December 1946 on Gandhi's insistence. In 1950 he was active in organising relief for refugees from East Pakistan, and he would become the general secretary of the All Bengal Refugee Association. His wife died in July 1952.

Mitra was a member of the All India Forward Bloc (Ruikar), and became a Praja Socialist Party member when the two parties merged. He would become a member of the West Bengal executive of PSP. Mitra was elected to the West Bengal Legislative Assembly in the 1957 election, standing as a PSP candidate in the Tollygunge constituency. He obtained 30,412 votes (56.52%). He was arrested during the 1958 and 1959 refugee movements. Mitra served as the president of several trade unions, such as the unions at Jessop & Company and Eastern C.C.S.

Mitra broke with PSP in 1962, along with some 350 PSP workers, as he felt the party had outlived its purpose. He joined the Indian National Congress, arguing that only the Congress Party had the capacity to confront big finance capital and implement socialism. Mitra was a co-founder of the Bangla Congress. He won the Chakdah seat in the 1967 West Bengal Legislative Assembly election, standing as the Bangla Congress candidate and obtaining 20,761 votes (42.11%). He served as the Deputy Speaker of the West Bengal Legislative Assembly between 1967 and 1968. He contested the Bankura Lok Sabha seat in the 1971 Indian general election as the Bangla Congress candidate, finishing in fourth place with 29,576 votes (12.03%).

He returned to the West Bengal Legislative Assembly election in the 1972 election. He stood as the Congress(R) candidate in Chakdah, and 33,144 votes (57.42%). After the election he was again elected Deputy Speaker, serving in the role between 24 March 1972 to 30 April 1977. Haridas Mitra died on 20 April 1992.
