= Satya Sadhan Chakraborty =

Indian academic

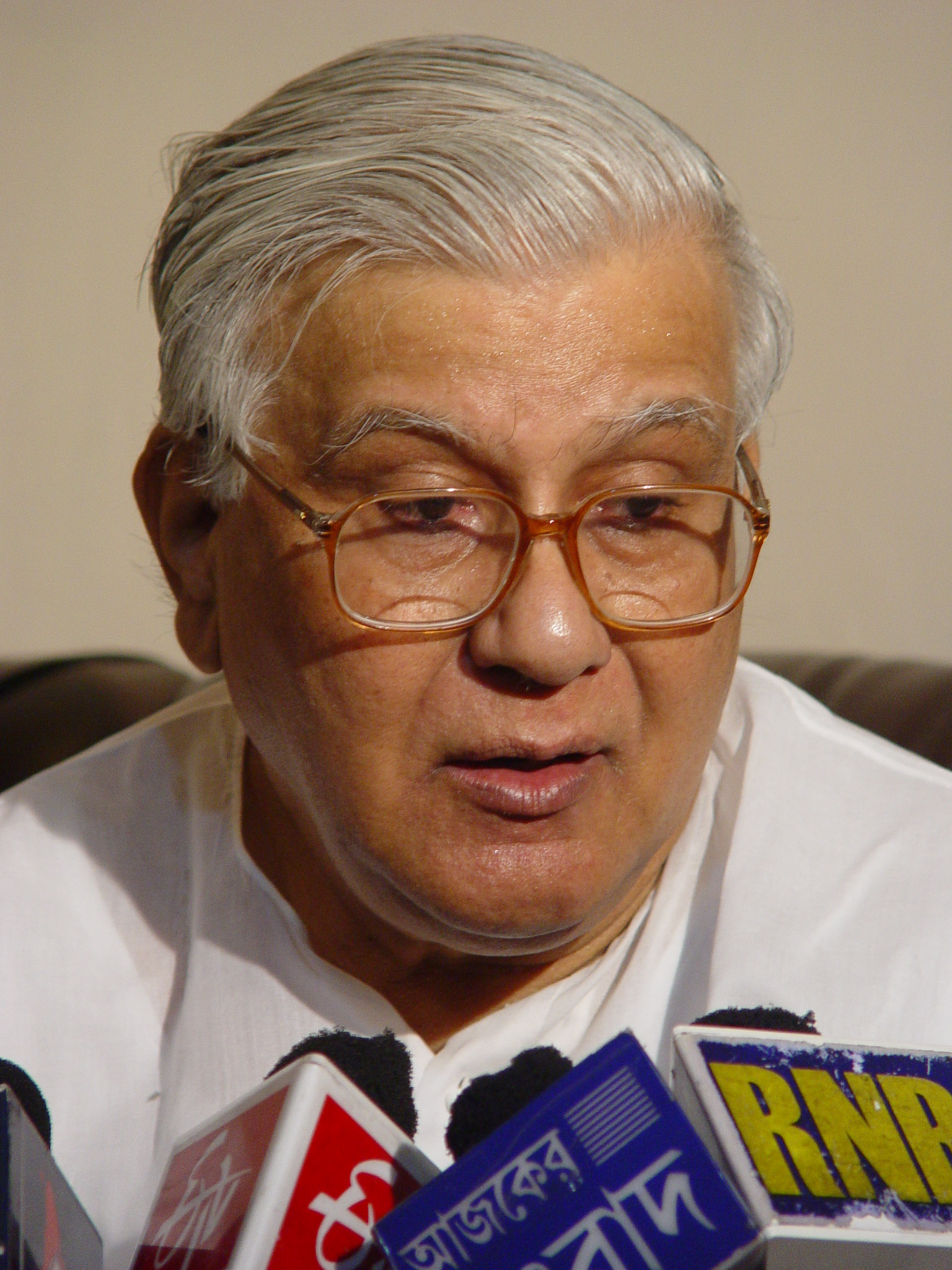
- Chakraborty in 2004

Member of Parliament, Lok Sabha
- In office 1980–1984
- Preceded by: Dilip Chakravarty
- Succeeded by: Bhola Nath Sen
- Constituency: Calcutta South

Higher Education Minister of West Bengal
- In office 1991–2006
- Succeeded by: Sudarshan Roy Chowdhury

West Bengal Legislative Assembly
- In office 1991–2006
- Preceded by: Subhas Basu
- Succeeded by: Malay Kumar Samanta
- Constituency: Chakdaha

Personal details
- Born: 1933 Harina, Comilla, Bengal Presidency, British India
- Died: 16 June 2018 (aged 85) Salt Lake, Kolkata, West Bengal, India
- Party: Communist Party of India (Marxist)
- Education: University of Calcutta

Satya Sadhan Chakraborty (1933 – 16 June 2018) was an Indian academic and politician from West Bengal belonging to Communist Party of India (Marxist). He was a member of the Lok Sabha and West Bengal Legislative Assembly. He also served as a minister of the Government of West Bengal.

== Early life and education ==
Chakraborty was born on 1933 at Harina in Comilla. He graduated from Bangabasi College. Later, he completed postgraduate studies from University of Calcutta in political science.

== Career ==
Chakraborty was a professor of the Vidyasagar College. He also coauthored a book titled Bharoter Shasonbyabostha O Rajneeti with Nimai Pramanik. The book is used as a textbook in graduate level. Besides, he served as the general secretary of the West Bengal College and University Teachers' Association and All India Federation of University & College Teachers' Organisations.

Chakraborty was elected as a member of the Lok Sabha from Calcutta South in 1980. Later, he was elected as a member of the West Bengal Legislative Assembly from Chakdaha in 1991, 1996 and 2001. He also served as the Higher Education Minister of the Government of West Bengal from 1991 to 2006.

== Personal life ==
Chakroborty was married to Sukla Chakraborty in 1961. They had one daughter.

== Death ==
Chakraborty died on 16 June 2018 at Salt Lake in Kolkata at the age of 85.
