= List of West Bengal ministries =

Indian state governments

This is a list of the Chief Minister cabinets of West Bengal from the time of independence to the present day.

== List ==
No.	Name	Formed	Ended	Election	Party	System	Ref.
1	Ghosh	1947	1948	1946	INC	Parliamentary	
2	Roy I	1948	1952	1946	INC	Parliamentary	
3	Roy II	1950	1952		INC	Parliamentary	
4	Roy III	1952	1957	1952	INC	Parliamentary	
5	Roy IV	1957	1962	1957	INC	Parliamentary	
6	Roy V	1962	1962	1962	INC	Parliamentary	
7	Sen	1962	1967	1962	INC	Parliamentary	
8	Mukherjee I	1967	1967	1967	UF	Parliamentary	
9	Ghosh II	1967	1968	1967	UF	Parliamentary	
10	Mukherjee II	1969	1970	1969	UF	Parliamentary	
11	Mukherjee III	1971	1971	1971	INC(R)	Parliamentary	
12	Ray	1972	1977	1972	INC(R)	Parliamentary	
13	Basu I	1977	1982	1977	LF	Parliamentary	
14	Basu II	1982	1987	1982	LF	Parliamentary	
15	Basu III	1987	1991	1987	LF	Parliamentary	
16	Basu IV	1991	1996	1991	LF	Parliamentary	
17	Basu V	1996	2000	1996	LF	Parliamentary	
18	Bhattacharjee I	2000	2001	1996	LF	Parliamentary	
19	Bhattacharjee II	2001	2006	2001	LF	Parliamentary	
20	Bhattacharjee III	2006	2011	2006	LF	Parliamentary	
21	Banerjee I	2011	2016	2011	TMC	Parliamentary	
22	Banerjee II	2016	2021	2016	TMC	Parliamentary	
23	Banerjee III	2021	2026	2021	TMC	Parliamentary	
24	Adhikari	2026	2031	2026	BJP	Parliamentary	

== See also ==
- Chief Minister of West Bengal
- List of cabinets of Bengal
