= Cossipur Assembly constituency =

Former West Bengal Legislative Assembly constituency

Coordinates: 22°37′23″N 88°22′30″E

Cossipur
- Former constituency No. 140 for the West Bengal Legislative Assembly

Constituency details
- Country: India
- Region: East India
- State: West Bengal
- District: Kolkata
- Lok Sabha constituency: Calcutta North West
- Established: 1951
- Abolished: 2011
- Reservation: None

Cossipur Assembly constituency was a Legislative Assembly constituency of Kolkata district in the Indian state of West Bengal.

== Overview ==
As a consequence of the orders of the Delimitation Commission, Cossipur Assembly constituency ceases to exist from 2011.

It was part of Calcutta North West (Lok Sabha constituency).

== Members of the Legislative Assembly ==
Election Year	Constituency	Name of M.L.A.	Party affiliation
1951	Cossipur	Biswanath Roy	Indian National Congress
1957		Deben Sen	Praja Socialist Party
1962		Sunil Kumar Dasgupta	Indian National Congress
1967		S.K.Roy	Indian National Congress
1969		Vishnu Gopal Basu	Communist Party of India (Marxist)
1971		Prafulla Kanti Ghosh	Indian National Congress
1972		Prafulla Kanti Ghosh	Indian National Congress
1977		Buddhadeb Bhattacharjee	Communist Party of India (Marxist)
1982		Prafulla Kanti Ghosh	Indian National Congress
1987		Dipak Chanda	Communist Party of India (Marxist)
1991		Dipak Chanda	Communist Party of India (Marxist)
1996		Tarak Bandyopadhyay	Indian National Congress
2001		Tarak Bandyopadhyay	All India Trinamool Congress
2006		Tarak Bandyopadhyay	All India Trinamool Congress

== Results ==
=== 1977-2009 ===
In the 2006 and 2001 state assembly elections Tarak Bandopadhyay representing Trinamool Congress won the 140 Cossipur assembly seat defeating Salil Chatterjee of CPI (M), and Bijoy Bhattacharjee of CPI(M) respectively. In 1996, Tarak Bandopadhyay representing Congress defeated Anup Das of CPI(M). Dipak Chanda of CPI(M) defeated Prafulla Kanti Ghosh of Congress in 1991 and 1987. In 1982, Prafulla Kanti Ghosh of Congress defeated Buddhadeb Bhattacharya of CPI(M). In 1977, Buddhadeb Bhattacharya of CPI(M) defeated Prafulla Kanti Ghosh of Congress.

=== 1951-1972 ===
The Cossipore seat was won by Prafulla Kanti Ghosh of Congress defeating his nearest rival Paresh Nath Banerjee of CPI(M) in 1972 and Krishna Gopal Basu of CPI(M) in 1971. Vishnu Gopal Basu of CPI(M) defeated Sushil Kumar Paul of Congress in 1969. S.K.Roy of Congress defeated P.Dasguta of CPI(M) in 1967. Sunil Kumar Dasgupta of Congress won in 1962 defeating Mohit Kumar Moitra of CPI(M). Deben Sen of PSP won in 1957 defeating Biswanath Roy of Congress. Biswanath Roy of Congress won in independent India’s first general election in 1951 defeating Jyotirmoy Sharma of CPI.
