= Tarak Bandyopadhyay =

Indian politician

West Bengal Legislative Assembly
- In office 1996–2011
- Preceded by: Dipak Chanda
- Succeeded by: Constituency Dissolved
- Constituency: Cossipur

Personal details
- Born: c. 1943
- Died: 10 October 2013 (aged 70)
- Party: All India Trinamool Congress

Tarak Bandyopadhyay (c. 1943 – 10 October 2013) was an Indian politician from West Bengal belonging to All India Trinamool Congress. He was a member of the West Bengal Legislative Assembly.

== Biography ==
Bandyopadhyay was elected as a legislator of the West Bengal Legislative Assembly as an Indian National Congress candidate from Cossipur in 1996. Later, he joined Trinamool Congress. He was elected as a legislator of the West Bengal Legislative Assembly as a Trinamool Congress candidate from Cossipur in 2001 and 2006.

Bandyopadhyay died of cardiac arrest on 10 October 2013 at the age of 70.
