= Chhoto Angaria massacre =

2001 alleged killing in West Bengal, India

Chhoto Angaria massacre was a case of allegedly burning alive of 11 Trinamool Congress supporters on 4 January 2001 by alleged Communist Party of India (Marxist) (CPI(M)) workers in West Bengal state in India. The CBI found that the two CPI(M) leaders had been involved in the incident but failed to arrest them. The CBI had then filed chargesheets against the two but they were absconding. In the second week of November 2007, the two were arrested when they were leaving Nandigram.

Overall, 13 people were charged within a few months of the incident, but were acquitted in 2009. Five others went on the run, and one CPM cadre was arrested in 2011. As of 2013, no bodies have been discovered. In 2013, the chief witness in a 2008 hearing testified before a court in Midnapore that he had been forced to lie by CPM leaders after having his son's life threatened and named four CPM leaders as being responsible.
