= Khardaha Assembly constituency =

Constituency of the West Bengal Legislative Assembly, in India

Khardaha
- Constituency No. 109 for the West Bengal Legislative Assembly
- Interactive Map Outlining Khardaha Assembly Constituency

Constituency details
- Country: India
- Region: East India
- State: West Bengal
- District: North 24 Parganas
- Lok Sabha constituency: Dum Dum
- Established: 1957
- Total electors: 168,586
- Reservation: None

Member of Legislative Assembly
- 18th West Bengal Legislative Assembly
- Incumbent Kalyan Chakraborti
- Party: Bharatiya Janata Party
- Elected year: 2026

Khardaha Assembly constituency is a Legislative Assembly constituency of North 24 Parganas district in the Indian state of West Bengal.

Most successful parties from Khardaha assembly
1. Communist Party of India (Marxist) (11 times) (61.1%)
2. Trinamool Congress (4 times) (22.2%)
3. Communist Party of India (1 time) (5.55%)
4. Praja Socialist Party (1 time) (5.55%)
5. Bharatiya Janata Party (1 time) (5.55%)

== Overview ==
As per orders of the Delimitation Commission, No. 109 Khardaha Assembly constituency is composed of the following: Khardaha municipality, Ward Nos.15, 18 to 21 and 35 of Panihati municipality, and Bandipur, Bilkanda I, Bilkanda II and Patulia gram panchayats of Barrackpore II community development block.

Khardaha Assembly constituency is part of No. 16 Dum Dum (Lok Sabha constituency).

== Members of the Legislative Assembly ==
Year	Name	Party
1952	Constituency did not exist	
1957	Satkari Mitra	Praja Socialist Party
1962	Gopal Banerjee	Communist Party of India
1967	Sadhan Kumar Chakraborty	Communist Party of India (Marxist)
1969	Sadhan Kumar Chakraborty	Communist Party of India (Marxist)
1971	Sadhan Kumar Chakraborty	Communist Party of India (Marxist)
1972	Sisir Kumar Ghosh	Communist Party of India (Marxist)
1977	Kamal Sarkar	Communist Party of India (Marxist)
1982	Kamal Sarkar	Communist Party of India (Marxist)
1987	Asim Dasgupta	Communist Party of India (Marxist)
1991	Asim Dasgupta	Communist Party of India (Marxist)
1996	Asim Dasgupta	Communist Party of India (Marxist)
2001	Asim Dasgupta	Communist Party of India (Marxist)
2006	Asim Dasgupta	Communist Party of India (Marxist)
2011	Amit Mitra	Trinamool Congress
2016	Amit Mitra	Trinamool Congress
2021	Kajal Sinha	Trinamool Congress
2021^	Sovandeb Chattopadhyay	Trinamool Congress
2026	Kalyan Chakraborti	Bharatiya Janata Party

- ^ by-election

== Election results ==
=== 2026 ===
2026 West Bengal Legislative Assembly election: Khardaha
Party	Candidate	Votes	%	±%
BJP	Kalyan Chakraborti	97,752	49.75	+16.08
AITC	Devadeep Purohit	73,266	37.28	−11.76
CPI(M)	Debojyoti Das	19,818	10.09	−4.61
NOTA	None of the above	1,316	0.67	−0.65
Majority		24,486	12.47	−2.9
Turnout		196,505	93.53	+14.8
BJP gain from AITC		Swing		

=== 2021 ===
2021 West Bengal Legislative Assembly election: Khardaha
Party	Candidate	Votes	%	±%
AITC	Kajal Sinha	89,807	49.04	
BJP	Shilbhadra Dutta	61,667	33.67	
CPI(M)	Debojyoti Das	26,916	14.7	
NOTA	None of the above	2,415	1.32	
Majority		28,140	15.37	
Turnout		183,147	78.73	

2021 By-election: Khardaha
Party	Candidate	Votes	%	±%
AITC	Sovandeb Chattopadhyay	114,086	73.59	+24.55
BJP	Joy Saha	20,254	13.07	−20.6
CPI(M)	Debajyoti Das	16,110	10.39	−4.31
Majority		93,832	60.52	
Turnout		1,55,069	66.73	
AITC hold		Swing		

=== 2016 ===
2016 West Bengal Legislative Assembly election: Khardaha
Party	Candidate	Votes	%	±%
AITC	Dr. Amit Mitra	83,680	49.65	−6.84
CPI(M)	Dr. Asim Dasgupta	62,488	37.07	−1.75
BJP	Mahadeb Basak	16,321	9.68	+7.2
NOTA	None of the above	3,169	1.88	
BSP	Samar Das	1,568	0.93	−0.29
PDS	Paritosh Sengupta	1,322	0.78	−0.21
Majority		21,200	12.58	
Turnout		1,68,666	82.33	
AITC hold		Swing		

=== 2011 ===
In the 2011 elections, Amit Kumar Mitra of Trinamool Congress defeated his nearest rival Asim Dasgupta of CPI(M).

2011 West Bengal Legislative Assembly election: Khardaha
Party	Candidate	Votes	%	±%
AITC	Dr. Amit Kumar Mitra	83,608	56.49	
CPI(M)	Dr. Asim Dasgupta	57,454	38.82	
BJP	Anadi Kumar Biswas	3,673	2.48	
BSP	Sampa Biswas	1,813	1.22	
PDS	Jay Prakash Pandey	1,470	0.99	
Majority		26,154	17.67	
Turnout		1,48,050	87.26	
AITC gain from CPI(M)		Swing		

Trinamool Congress did not contest this seat in 2006

=== 2006 ===
In the 2006, 2001, 1996, 1991 and 1987 state assembly elections, Asim Dasgupta of CPI(M), won the Khardaha seat defeating his nearest rivals Mahadeb Basak of BJP in 2006, Ranjit Kumar Mukherjee of Trinamool Congress in 2001, Chinmoy Chatterjee of Congress in 1996, Sipta Bishnu of Congress in 1991 and Sudhir Banerjee of Congress in 1987. Kamal Sarkar of CPI(M) had won this seat in 1982 and 1977 defeating Nirmal Ghosh of Congress in 1982 and Harshadhari Bhattacharya of Congress in 1977.

=== 1972 ===
Satkari Mitra of PSP won in 1957. Gopal Banerjee of CPI won in 1962. Sadhan Kumar Chakraborty of CPI(M) won in 1967, 1969 and 1971. Sisir Kumar Ghosh of CPI won in 1972.

=== 1952 ===
The Khardaha constituency did not exist in 1952.
