= Bardhaman Dakshin Assembly constituency =

Bardhaman Dakshin
- Constituency No. 260 for the West Bengal Legislative Assembly
- Interactive Map Outlining Bardhaman Dakshin Assembly Constituency

Constituency details
- Country: India
- Region: East India
- State: West Bengal
- District: Purba Bardhaman
- Lok Sabha constituency: Bardhaman–Durgapur
- Established: 1951
- Total electors: 213,910
- Reservation: None

Member of Legislative Assembly
- 18th West Bengal Legislative Assembly
- Incumbent Moumita Biswas Mishra
- Party: BJP
- Alliance: NDA
- Elected year: 2026

Bardhaman Dakshin Assembly constituency is an assembly constituency in Purba Bardhaman district in the Indian state of West Bengal.

== Overview ==
As per order of the Delimitation Commission, No. 260 Bardhaman Dakshin Assembly constituency covers Bardhaman municipality.

Bardhaman Dakshin assembly segment is part of No. 39 Bardhaman–Durgapur Lok Sabha constituency.

== Members of the Legislative Assembly ==
Year	Name	Party
Bardhaman
1951	Benoy Choudhury	Communist Party of India
1957	Benoy Choudhury	Communist Party of India
1962	Radharani Mahtab	Indian National Congress
1967	S. B. Chowdhury	Indian National Congress
Bardhaman Dakshin
1969	Benoy Choudhury	Communist Party of India (Marxist)
1971	Benoy Choudhury	Communist Party of India (Marxist)
1972	Pradip Bhattacharya	Indian National Congress
1977	Benoy Choudhury	Communist Party of India (Marxist)
1982	Benoy Choudhury	Communist Party of India (Marxist)
1987	Nirupam Sen	Communist Party of India (Marxist)
1991	Shyama Prosad Bose	Communist Party of India (Marxist)
1996	Shyama Prosad Bose	Communist Party of India (Marxist)
2001	Nirupam Sen	Communist Party of India (Marxist)
2006	Nirupam Sen	Communist Party of India (Marxist)
2011	Rabi Ranjan Chattopadhyay	Trinamool Congress
2016	Rabi Ranjan Chattopadhyay	Trinamool Congress
2021	Khokan Das	Trinamool Congress
2026	Moumita Biswas Mishra	Bharatiya Janata Party

== Election results ==
=== 2026 ===
2026 West Bengal Legislative Assembly election: Bardhaman Dakshin
Party	Candidate	Votes	%	±%
BJP	Moumita Biswas Mishra	107,754	52.61	▲12.23
AITC	Khokan Das	77,284	37.73	▼6.59
CPI(M)	Sudipta Gupta	13,137	6.41	▼4.96
INC	Gourab Samaddar	2,060	1.01	New entry
NOTA	None of the above	2,364	1.15	▼0.66
Majority		30,470	14.88	▲10.94
Turnout		204,823	92.21	▲12.6
BJP gain from AITC		Swing		

=== 2021 ===
2021 West Bengal Legislative Assembly election: Bardhaman Dakshin
Party	Candidate	Votes	%	±%
AITC	Khokan Das	91,015	44.32	▼3.02
BJP	Sandip Nandi	82,910	40.38	▲32.04
CPI(M)	Pritha Tah	23,346	11.37	▼20.8
NOTA	None of the above	3,707	1.81	
Majority		8,105	3.94	
Turnout		205,345	79.61	
AITC hold		Swing		

=== 2016 ===
2016 West Bengal Legislative Assembly election: Bardhaman Dakshin
Party	Candidate	Votes	%	±%
AITC	Rabi Ranjan Chattopadhyay	91,882	47.34	▼10.36
CPI(M)	Ainul Haque	62,444	32.17	▼5.72
Independent	Samir Kumar Roy	17,205	8.86	New entry
BJP	Prabal Roy	16,192	8.34	▲5.32
NOTA	None of the above	3,394	1.75	New entry
BSP	Mohammad Harun	1,616	0.83	▼0.56
SUCI(C)	Parikshit Gorain	1,363	0.70	New entry
Majority		29,438	12.77	▼7.04
Turnout		1,94,096	80.49	▼5.98
AITC hold		Swing		

=== 2011 ===
2011 West Bengal Legislative Assembly election: Bardhaman Dakshin
Party	Candidate	Votes	%	±%
AITC	Rabi Ranjan Chattopadhyay	107,520	57.70	
CPI(M)	Nirupam Sen	70,604	37.89	
BJP	Sandip Nandi	5,621	3.02	
BSP	Mohammad Harun	2,593	1.39	
Majority		36,916	19.81	
Turnout		1,86,338	86.47	
AITC gain from CPI(M)		Swing		

=== 2006 ===
Nirupam Sen of CPI (M) won the Bardhaman Dakshin assembly seat in 2006 and 2001 state assembly elections defeating his nearest rivals Samir Kumar Roy and Paresh Chandra Sarkar (both of Trinamool Congress) in the respective years. Contests in most years were multi cornered but only winners and runners are being mentioned. In 1996 and 1991, Shyamaprosad Bose of CPI (M) defeated Sadhan Kumar Ghosh and Shyamadas Banerjee (both of Congress) in respective years. In 1987, Nirupam Sen of CPI (M) defeated Pradip Bhattacharya of Congress. In 1982 and 1977, Kaustav Roy of CPI (M) defeated Shyamadas Banerjee and Pradip Bhattacharya (both of Congress) in the respective years. Pradip Bhattacharya of Congress won the seat in 1972. Benoy Choudhury of CPI (M) won the seat in 1971 and 1969. S.B.Chowdhury of Congress won the seat in 1967. However, both in 1982 and 1987, the preferred choice of candidate was Sujit Chandra Das of the Indian National Congress. Some unconfirmed sources suggest that in order to avoid infighting within the party & also due to some differences with the then State Pradesh Congress leadership, he opted not to contest the elections.

It is, however, believed that the Congress would not have lost the seat in 1987 had the Congress nominated Sujit Chandra Das instead of Pradip Bhattacharya & Shyamadas Banerjee. Such was the reputation, popularity & charisma of Sujit Das that even various prominent CPI(M) politburo members like Benoy Chowdhury & the then ministers in the Left front cabinet Nirupam Sen & Nisith Adhikary had in one interview acknowledged that it would have been difficult for the CPI(M) to retain the Burdwan South seat both in 1982 & 1987 if Sujit Das had contested the elections on a Congress ticket. He was one of the very few congress leaders to be admired by the CPI(M), at large. Ministers like Nisith Adhikary used to stay in his house. He was much loved across political boundaries.

Due to internal factionalism and on account of some personal reasons, Sujit Das, then an employee of Burdwan University had opted to stay out of the electoral race mostly due to a fallout with Priya Ranjan Das Munshi, else various sources [though unconfirmed] revealed he would have had defeated Nirupam Sen in 1987 as well as in 1982. Senior Congress leaders from the district like Manteswar MLA Tuhin Samanta, MLA from Faridpur Ajit Bandhopadyay, MLA Jamalpur Puranjoy Pramanick, Nurul Islam, Galsi MLA Ashwini Roy, had in a petition to the congress high command proposed his name for the 1977 Assembly Elections during the strong anti incumbency of the WB Congress party. He was the sole architect who arranged for funds and had orchestrated the entire win for Pradip Bhattacharya in 1972. Pradip Bhattacharya, also a prominent youth leader in the early 1970s, became the Labour Minister in the Siddhartha Shankar Ray led ministry. It is he [Sujit Das] who had proposed the name of Shyamadas Banerjee as a Congress candidate in 1982. Mostly a trouble shooter for the party during crisis, Sujit Das, an avid sportsperson and district cricket team captain was a very prominent Chattra Parishad student leader and hailed from one of the reputed and wealthiest families in Burdwan. His popularity in town had no political boundaries. Leaders, members and workers from across parties admired his personality, helpful nature and honesty. He was even offered to contest in a Congress ticket from Galsi Assembly seat, which he eventually refused. One of his brothers had served as the Chairman of Burdwan Municipality. Many of his family members had served as Councillors of Burdwan Municipality.

=== 1962 ===
Radharani Mahtab of Congress won the Bardhaman seat in 1962. Benoy Choudhuri representing CPI won the seat in 1957 and 1951.
