= Belgachia East Assembly constituency =

Former Legislative Assembly constituency in West Bengal, India

Coordinates: 22°36′11″N 88°23′24″E

Belgachia East
- Former constituency No. 139 for the West Bengal Legislative Assembly

Constituency details
- Country: India
- Region: East India
- State: West Bengal
- District: Kolkata
- Lok Sabha constituency: Dum Dum
- Established: 1951
- Abolished: 2011
- Reservation: None

Belgachia East Assembly constituency was a Legislative Assembly constituency of Kolkata district in the Indian state of West Bengal.

== Overview ==
As a consequence of the orders of the Delimitation Commission, Belgachia East Assembly constituency ceased to exist from 2011.

It was part of Dum Dum (Lok Sabha constituency).

== Members of the Legislative Assembly ==
Year	Member	Party
1951	Ganesh Ghosh	Communist Party of India
1957	Ganesh Ghosh	Communist Party of India
1962	Ganesh Ghosh	Communist Party of India
1967	Lakshmi Charan Sen	Communist Party of India (Marxist)
1969	Lakshmi Charan Sen	Communist Party of India (Marxist)
1971	Lakshmi Charan Sen	Communist Party of India (Marxist)
1972	Ganapati Sur	Indian National Congress
1977	Subhas Chakraborty	Communist Party of India (Marxist)
1982	Subhas Chakraborty	Communist Party of India (Marxist)
1987	Subhas Chakraborty	Communist Party of India (Marxist)
1991	Subhas Chakraborty	Communist Party of India (Marxist)
1996	Subhas Chakraborty	Communist Party of India (Marxist)
2001	Subhas Chakraborty	Communist Party of India (Marxist)
2006	Subhas Chakraborty	Communist Party of India (Marxist)
2009^	Sujit Bose	Trinamool Congress

- ^ by-election

== Results ==
=== 1977-2009 Belgachia East ===
In the by-election held in 2009 as a result of the death of the sitting MLA Subhas Chakraborty, Sujit Bose of Trinamool Congress won the 139 Belgachia East seat defeating Ramala Chakrabarty of CPI(M). Subhas Chakrabarty of CPI(M) won the Belgachia East seat seven times in a row from 1977 to 2006. In 2006 and 2001, he defeated Sujit Bose of Trinamool Congress. In 1996 he defeated Arunava Ghosh of Congress. In 1991 and 1987, he defeated Kumares Basu of Congress. In 1982 he defeated Shyamal Bhattacharjee of Congress. In 1977, he defeated Samir Chatterjee of Janata Party.

=== 1951-1972 Belgachia ===
During the period there was only one seat for Belgachia. Ganapati Sur of Congress defeated Lakshmi Charan Sen of CPI(M) in 1972. Lakshmi Charan Sen of CPI(M) defeated Ganapati Sur of Congress in 1971, Suchit Kumar Sur of Congress in 1969 and Ganapati Sur of Congress in 1967. Ganesh Ghosh of CPI won the seat defeating Ganapati Sur of Congress in 1962, Nandalal Banerjee of Congress in 1957 and in independent India's first election in 1951 defeating Sudhir Kumar De of Congress.
