= Belanagar railway station =

Railway station in West Bengal, India

Belanagar
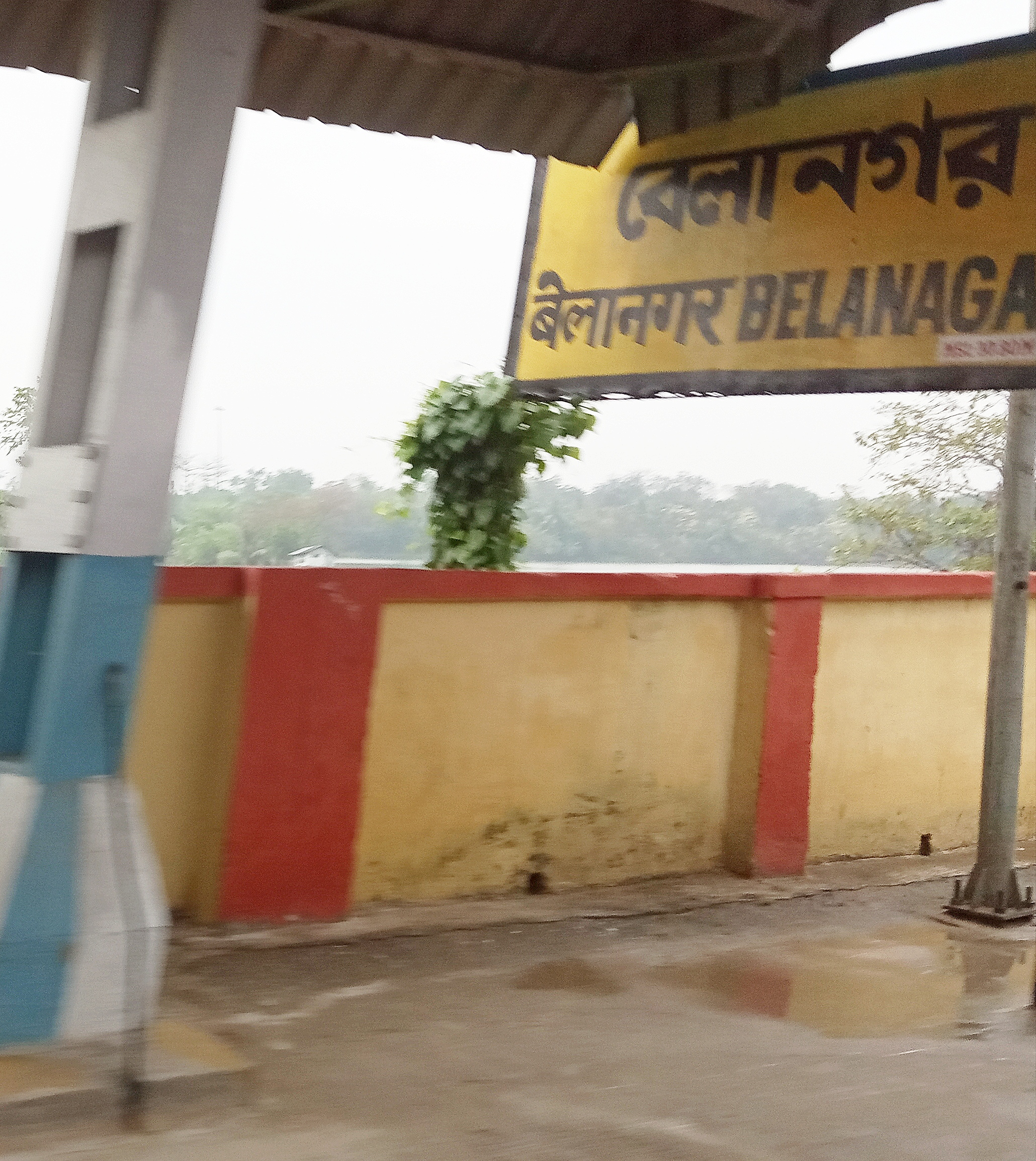
- Belanagar railway station

General information
- Location: Bally Jagachha Block, Belanagar, Howrah district, West Bengal; India
- Coordinates: 22°39′40″N 88°19′04″E
- Elevation: 8 metres (26 ft)
- System: Kolkata Suburban Railway
- Owner: Indian Railways
- Operator: Eastern Railway
- Line: Howrah–Bardhaman chord
- Platforms: 3
- Tracks: 3

Construction
- Structure type: Standard (on-ground station)
- Parking: No

Other information
- Status: Functioning
- Station code: BZL
- Division(s): Howrah

History
- Opened: 1958
- Electrified: 1964
- Former names: East Indian Railway Company

Services
Preceding station	Kolkata Suburban Railway	Following station
Bally towards Howrah Junction	Eastern Line Howrah–Bardhaman chord	Dankuni Junction towards Barddhaman Junction
Route map
Location
- Location within Kolkata Location within West Bengal Location within India

Belanagar railway station is a Kolkata Suburban Railway station on the Howrah–Bardhaman chord line operated by Eastern Railway zone of Indian Railways. It is situated at Bally Jagachha Block, Belanagar in Howrah district in the Indian state of West Bengal. Number of EMU trains stop at Belanagar railway station. This railway station is named after Bela Mitra, a freedom fighter and social activist. This was the first Railway station in India named after any Indian woman.

== History ==
The Howrah–Bardhaman chord, the 95 kilometers railway line was constructed in 1917. It was connected with Sealdah through Dankuni after construction of Vivekananda Setu in 1932. Howrah to Bardhaman chord line including Belanagar railway station was electrified in 1964–66.
