= Hasnabad Assembly constituency =

Coordinates: 22.58°N 88.92°E

Hasnabad
- Former constituency No. 96 for the West Bengal Legislative Assembly

Constituency details
- Country: India
- Region: East India
- State: West Bengal
- District: North 24 Parganas
- Lok Sabha constituency: Basirhat
- Established: 1951
- Abolished: 2011
- Reservation: None

Party-wise wins in Hasnabad Assembly constituency
1. Communist Party of India (Marxist) (7) (43.8%)
2. Indian National Congress (6) (37.5%)
3. Communist Party of India (2) (12.5%)
4. Bangla Congress (1) (6.25%)

Hasnabad Assembly constituency was an assembly constituency in North 24 Parganas district in the Indian state of West Bengal.

== Overview ==
As a consequence of the orders of the Delimitation Commission, Hasnabad Assembly constituency ceases to exist from 2011. Prior to 2011 Basirhat had one assembly constituency. From 2011 it will have two constituencies Basirhat Dakshin Assembly constituency and Basirhat Uttar Assembly constituency.

It was part of Basirhat (Lok Sabha constituency).

== Members of the Legislative Assembly ==
Election Year	Constituency	Name of M.L.A.	Party affiliation
1951	Hasnabad	Dinesh Chandra Sen	Indian National Congress
		Ram Krishna Mondal	Indian National Congress
1957		Hemanta Kumar Ghoshal	Communist Party of India
		Ram Krishna Mondal	Indian National Congress
1962		Dinabandhu Das	Indian National Congress
1967		H.N.Mazumdar	Bangla Congress
1969		Abdur Razzaque Khan	Communist Party of India
1971		Molla Tasmatulla	Indian National Congress
1972		Molla Tasmatulla	Indian National Congress
1977		Amiya Bhusan Banerjee	Communist Party of India (Marxist)
1982		Amiya Bhusan Banerjee	Communist Party of India (Marxist)
1987		Gautam Deb	Communist Party of India (Marxist)
1991		Gautam Deb	Communist Party of India (Marxist)
1996		Gautam Deb	Communist Party of India (Marxist)
2001		Gautam Deb	Communist Party of India (Marxist)
2006		Gautam Deb	Communist Party of India (Marxist)

== Election results ==
=== 1977-2006 ===
Gautam Deb of CPI(M) won the 96 Hasnabad seat defeating Rafiqul Islam Mondal of Trinamool Congress in 2006 and 2001, and of Congress in 1996, Anath Bandhu Mitra of Congress in 1991 and Ananta Roy of Congress in 1987. Amiya Bhusan Banerjee of CPI(M) defeated Sekendar Kayal of MUL in 1982 and Mollah Tasmatullah in 1977.

=== 1951-1972 ===
Molla Tasmatulla of Congress won in 1972 and 1971. Abdur Razzaque Khan of CPI won in 1969. H.N.Mazumdar of Bangla Congress won in 1967. Dinabandhu Das of Congress won in 1962. Hemanta Kumar Ghoshal of CPI and Ramkrishna Mondal of Congress won the Hasnabad joint seat in 1957. In independent India’s first election in 1951, Dinesh Chandra Sen of Congress and Ram Krishna Mondal of Congress won the Hasnabad joint seat.
