= Rabiranjan Chattopadhyay =

Indian politician (1940–2021)

Minister for Technical Education and Training
- In office May 20, 2011 – 2016
- Governor: M. K. Narayanan
- Preceded by: Chakradhar Meikap
- Constituency: Bardhaman Dakshin

Minister for Science and Technology
- In office May 20, 2011 – 2016
- Governor: M. K. Narayanan
- Preceded by: Buddhadeb Bhattacharjee
- Constituency: Bardhaman Dakshin

Minister for Biotechnology
- In office May 20, 2011 – 2016
- Governor: M. K. Narayanan
- Preceded by: Dr Surjya Kanta Mishra
- Constituency: Bardhaman Dakshin

MLA
- In office 13 May 2011 – 3 May 2021
- Governor: M. K. Narayanan
- Constituency: Bardhaman Dakshin

Personal details
- Born: 30 September 1940
- Died: 2 November 2021 (aged 81)
- Party: All India Trinamool Congress
- Education: University of Burdwan (Ph.D.)
- Occupation: Poilitician

Rabiranjan Chattopadhyay (30 September 1940 – 2 November 2021) was an Indian politician and the erstwhile Minister for the departments of Technical Education and Training, Science and Technology and Biotechnology in the Government of West Bengal. He was also an MLA, elected from the Bardhaman Dakshin constituency in the 2011 West Bengal state assembly election. He was re-elected again in the 2016 West Bengal Legislative Assembly election.

Chattopadhyay died on 2 November 2021, aged 82, from diabetes and other complications.

| Preceded by Nirupam Sen | Member of the West Bengal Legislative Assembly from Bardhaman Dakshin Assembly constituency 2011– 2021 | Incumbent |
