= Nirupam Sen (politician) =

Indian politician (1946–2018)

- নিরুপম সেন

Minister of Commerce and Industries, Public Undertakings, Industrial Reconstruction, Government of West Bengal
- In office 2001-2011

Member of Legislative Assembly
- In office 1987-1991; 2001-2011
- Preceded by: Kaustav Roy; Shyamaprosad Bose
- Succeeded by: Shyamaprosad Bose; Rabiranjan Chattopadhyay
- Constituency: Bardhaman Dakshin

District Secretary, Burdwan district, CPI(M)
- In office 1989-1995

Member, Politburo, CPI(M)
- In office 2008-2015

Personal details
- Born: 8 October 1946 Barddhaman district, Bengal Presidency, British India
- Died: 24 December 2018 (aged 72) Bidhannagar, West Bengal, India
- Party: Communist Party of India (Marxist)

Nirupam Sen (8 October 1946 — 24 December 2018) was a Bengali Marxist political leader and former Commerce and Industries minister of the Government of West Bengal during 2001 to 2011. He was a senior leader of Communist Party of India (Marxist) and a member of the politburo of the party between 2008 and 2015. He was elected Member of Legislative Assembly thrice in 1987, 2001 and 2006.

== Early life ==
Sen was born in 1946 in Bardhaman, State of West Bengal. He became a member of the Communist Party of India (Marxist) during his student years. Although he started his career as a teacher, he became whole timer of the party in 1968.

== Political career ==
In 1966, Sen was appointed the district secretary of the Students Federation of India, students wing of the party. He played a key role in expanding the Party in Burdwan district, and served as the secretary of the Bardhaman district Committee from 1989 to 1995.

In 1987 West Bengal Legislative Assembly election, he was first elected as MLA from Bardhaman town assembly constituency.

He was elected to the West Bengal state committee in 1985 and he became a member of the state secretariat in 1995. He was elected to the Central Committee in 1998. He became a member of the Polit Bureau in 2008.

Sen was elected to the West Bengal State Assembly in 2001 and 2006 from the Bardhaman Dakshin.

After the Left Front was voted to power in 2001, Sen was handed the charge of Commerce and Industries and continued until 2011. He was considered to be the prime mover of the industrial drives in West Bengal. Under the leadership of him and then Chief Minister Buddhadeb Bhattacharya, Left Front Government led new industrialisation policy in Singur and Nandigram.

He was also a front-runner to become the secretary of West Bengal state committee of CPI(M) twice in 2006, after the death of Anil Biswas and again in 2012 after the party's drubbing in 2011 assembly elections.

He lost to the Trinamool Congress candidate Rabiranjan Chattopadhyay in 2011 from the same Vidhan Sabha.

He stepped down from the central committee and the politburo in 2015 and from the state committee in 2018 due to ill health. However, he became a special invitee to the Central Committee between 2015 and 2018.

== Controversy ==
By the end of 2006, the land acquisition movement at Hooghly over the Singur Tata Nano controversy had started taking a toll on the regime. The protest against the forcible land acquisition ultimately caused serious effects to the Government. Sen faced intense criticism both within and outside the party. Apart from land acquisition issues, Sen's name also cropped up in the Sainbari incident in March 1970 after the fall of United Front government in West Bengal. He along with Buddhadeb Bhattacharjee quit the Politburo during the party's Vishakapatanam Congress in 2015 due to ill health.

Sen was alleged to be linked to the Sainbari murder case where 3 brothers of the Sain family were brutally murdered, their home set on fire, an infant thrown into the fire and the family members thoroughly traumatized. The other names linked to this murder were those of Benoy Krishna Konar, Nirupam Sen and Amal Halder, all senior CPI(M) leaders. The Sain family has not received justice to date.

== Death ==
Since 2013, Sen was suffering from various health issues like neurological and kidney related ailments. He died on 24 December 2018 at 72 following a cardiac arrest in Bidhannagar.
