= Subhas Chakraborty =

Indian politician (1942–2009)

The Honourable Subhas Chakraborty

Minister of Transport, Government of West Bengal
- In office 1996–2009
- Preceded by: Shyamal Chakraborty
- Succeeded by: Ranjit Kundu

Minister of Sports and Youth Affairs, Government of West Bengal
- In office 1982–2009
- Preceded by: Jatin Chakraborty
- Succeeded by: Kanti Ganguly

Minister of Tourism, Government of West Bengal
- In office 1987–1996
- Succeeded by: Manab Mukherjee

Minister of Milk Development, Government of West Bengal
- In office 1982–1987

MLA
- In office 1977–2009
- Preceded by: Ganapati Sur
- Succeeded by: Sujit Bose
- Constituency: Belgachia East

General Secretary, Students' Federation of India
- In office 1976–1979
- Preceded by: Biman Bose
- Succeeded by: Nepaldev Bhattacharjee

Personal details
- Born: 18 March 1942 Dhaka, Bengal Presidency, British India
- Died: 3 August 2009 (aged 67) Kolkata, West Bengal, India
- Party: Communist Party of India (Marxist) (1964–2009)
- Other political affiliations: Communist Party of India (till 1964)
- Spouse: Ramala Chakraborty
- Education: University of Calcutta
- Profession: Politician, social worker

Subhas Chakraborty (18 March 1942 – 3 August 2009) was an Indian politician belonged to Communist Party of India (Marxist) who served as Minister of Transport, Sports and Youth Services in the Government of West Bengal.

== Early life ==
Chakraborty was born in Bengali Hindu Brahmin family of 1942 in Dhaka, British India to Hemchandra Chakraborty and Labonyoprobha Debi. His political career began from his residence in Dum Dum. It was a refugee colony.

Subhas Chakraborty studied at Dum Dum Motijheel College, which was then affiliated with the prestigious University of Calcutta. Thereafter, he was the Secretary of the Bengal Provincial Students' Federation, and after that served as the General Secretary of the SFI. In 1962 he joined the still undivided Communist Party of India (CPI) and in the 1964 party split, he aligned with the Communist Party of India (Marxist).

== Early political life ==
Chakraborty was elected as Secretary of the Bengal Provincial Students' Federation in 1969 and became the state secretary of the newly formed Students' Federation of India in 1970. He was elected as the all India general secretary of SFI in 1976 and continued in that position until 1979.

In the days of semi-fascist terror in West Bengal, he played an important role in defending the Party. His electoral successes started as far back as 1967 when he was elected a councilor with overwhelming popular support in the then south Dumdum municipality—and he remained a councilor until 1978. He was mentored by Pramod Dasgupta.

== Later political life ==
He was elected a member of the CPI(M) West Bengal state committee in 1971. He was elected as an MLA from the Belgachia East constituency in 1977 and continued representing it until his death in 2009.

In 1982, he became the state minister of Sports, Youth affairs and Milk development. In 1987 became a cabinet minister of Sports, Youth affairs and Tourism department. In 1991 also, he was the cabinet minister for same departments.

In 1996, he became the cabinet minister of Transport and Sports. He got the additional charge for Hooghly River Bridge Commissioners also in 2001.

In 2006, he was the cabinet minister of Transport, Sports and Youth Services. He served in those capacities until his death in 2009. He became a member of the state secretariat of the Party in 2008.

Throughout his life Subhas remained controversial, but was a down-to-earth person. He was more a mass leader than a political leader.

He was deeply involved with the world of sports and culture, as also with a string of social activities. He was the person whose determination called for the creation of Salt Lake stadium, one of the largest of its kind in Asia at that time.

Chakraborty was also the vice-president of the CITU's West Bengal branch. He was also a member of national council of CITU.

Due to emerging differences with the party leadership, he had decided to leave the party in early-2000s. However, he was desisted by Jyoti Basu and other leaders.

== Death ==
Chakraborty died on 3 August 2009 at 11:35 AM (IST) at the AMRI Hospitals, Kolkata a week after being admitted with lung and kidney disorders, and severe heart problems. Sources differ upon his age at the time of his death, some citing his age as having been 68 while others presented it as having been 66.

At his death, the nonagenarian Communist leader Jyoti Basu, who was also his political idol expressed "It is my time to go. But the irony is I am alive, while Subhas is no more. He was a very capable leader." Basu died five months later, incidentally in the same hospital as Chakraborty died.

Former India cricket captain Sourav Ganguly had said "I am shocked. I feel sad. I knew for the last few months that Subhasda was ill. He was a great personality. I knew him since my childhood as a family friend".

National Film Awards-winning actor Mithun Chakraborty said he was like an elder brother to him. "I loved him a lot. He helped everybody, irrespective of party affiliations. Every day 100-150 people would come to his residence for help. And nobody returned disappointed. He was a great lover of sports. He was always there when somebody was in crisis"—said the actor in a choked voice.

In Maidan, several clubs expressed their sorrow by flying their flags at half mast.

== Personal life ==
Chakraborty's wife, Ramala Chakraborty, is also a member of the CPI(M). She was a vice-president of the AIDWA West Bengal State Committee, the women's wing of the CPI(M) and a member of the district committee of North 24 Parganas of the CPI(M). Apart from that she was the convener of an NGO, Pather Panchali (which used to celebrate with Subhas's active participation the birthday of the former chief minister of West Bengal Mr. Jyoti Basu).
