= Asim Dasgupta =

Indian economist and politician

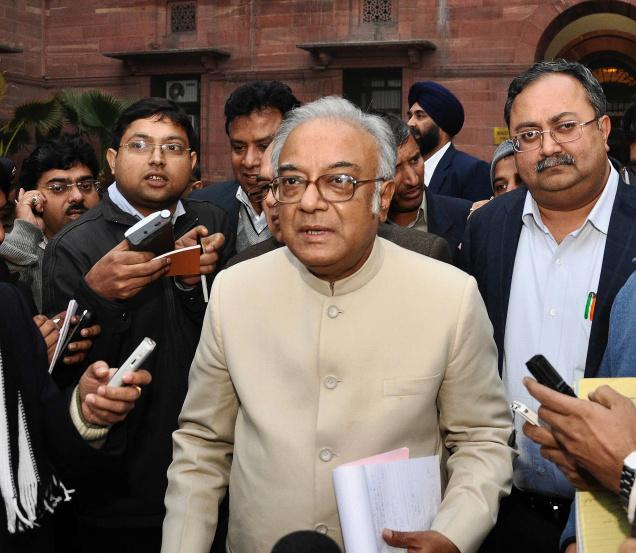

Finance Minister of West Bengal
- In office 5 June 1987 – 13 May 2011
- Preceded by: Ashok Mitra
- Succeeded by: Amit Mitra

Member of West Bengal Legislative Assembly
- In office 1987–2011
- Preceded by: Kamal Sarkar
- Succeeded by: Amit Mitra
- Constituency: Khardaha

Personal details
- Born: 29 October 1945 (age 80) Calcutta, Bengal Presidency, British India
- Party: Communist Party of India (Marxist)
- Education: University of Calcutta (BA, MA); Massachusetts Institute of Technology (PhD)
- Profession: Economist; Politician

Dr. Asim Kumar Dasgupta (born 30 October 1945) is an Indian economist and politician. He served as minister of finance and excise in the Left Front ministry in the Indian state of West Bengal. He was the MLA of Khardaha constituency for twenty-four years until 13 May 2011, when he was defeated by FICCI secretary general Amit Mitra by a landslide 26,154 votes in the 2011 Assembly Election of West Bengal. He was one of the 26 ministers who lost his seat in the historic defeat of Communist Party of India (Marxist) led Left Front government.

== Education and early life ==
He started his school life in Malda Zilla School and Then he earned his Undergraduate and Postgraduate Degrees in Economics from the University of Calcutta. Thereafter he secured a doctorate (PhD) in economics from the Massachusetts Institute of Technology. In his own words: My thesis supervisors were Robert Solow and Jagdish Bhagwati, but I had given my thesis to Prof (Paul) Samuelson to read and he not only agreed with it but also suggested some improvements. He started his career as a college lecturer and retired as a professor of economics at the University of Calcutta, before moving on to a career in politics.

== Role as a minister ==
After taking over the charge as a minister of finance and excise from Ashok Mitra in 1987, he faced scathing criticism for his so-called 0-deficit budget. The chief minister, Jyoti Basu, used to recommend him to the Chambers of Commerce as the "my US-trained finance minister who will listen to your new ideas" in the first days of liberalization in the 1990s.

As the chairman of the empowered committee on value-added tax (VAT), he masterminded the most ambitious tax reform in Indian history since the introduction of the first industry and trading taxes by the British in the early 20th century, by introducing the VAT. He was made the chairman of GST council by the NDA Govt in 2000. Dasgupta admitted in an interview that 80% of the plan had been formulated under his tenure in the GST Council. He resigned from the chairmanship in 2011. GST was finally implemented on 1 July 2017. He is referred to as the architect of India's GST.

== Political career ==
He was elected to the West Bengal Legislative Assembly from Khardah in 1987, 1991, 1996, 2001 and 2006. In 2011 he lost to Amit Mitra at Khardah.

In the General elections of 2014, he contested from Dum Dum, West Bengal but lost to Saugata Roy of TMC.
