= Gautam Deb =

Indian politician (born 1954)

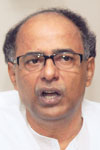

Minister for Public Health Engineering & Housing Affairs, Government of West Bengal
- In office 1991–2011
- Governor: Gopal Krishna Gandhi
- Succeeded by: Subrata Mukherjee & Aroop Biswas
- Constituency: Hasnabad

Member of the West Bengal Legislative Assembly
- In office 1987–2011
- Preceded by: Amiya Bhusan Banerjee
- Succeeded by: Constituency abolished
- Constituency: Hasnabad

Personal details
- Born: 3 January 1954 (age 72)
- Party: Communist Party of India (Marxist)
- Children: 1
- Education: University of Calcutta

Gautam Deb is an Indian politician. He served as the Housing Minister in the Communist Party of India (Marxist) led Left Front government of West Bengal. He was a MLA, elected from Hasnabad constituency defeating, Rafiqul Islam Mondal of the Trinamool Congress in 2006 and 2001, and of Congress in 1996, Anath Bandhu Mitra of Congress in 1991 and Ananta Roy of Congress in 1987.

In the 2011 Assembly Election of West Bengal he filed his candidature from Dum Dum where he was defeated by Bratya Basu, the Bengali dramatist, director and actor who was a newcomer to politics. He was one of the 26 ministers who lost in this historic defeat of the Left Front government. However, his did not deter Deb who is still fighting against TMC and inspiring many through his speeches.

He is a member of the Central Committee of the Communist Party of India, and a secretariat member of the party's West Bengal State Committee. On 28 January 2012, he was unanimously elected as the secretary of party's North 24-Parganas District Committee of 69 members, succeeding veteran leader Amitava Bose.
