= Kanti Ganguly =

Indian politician

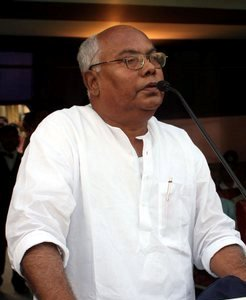

Member of the West Bengal Legislative Assembly
- In office 2001-2011
- Preceded by: Satya Ranjan Bapuli
- Succeeded by: Constituency abolished
- Constituency: Mathurapur

Minister of Sundarbans Development Government of West Bengal
- In office 2001-2011

Minister of Sports and youth affairs Government of West Bengal
- In office 2009-2011

Personal details
- Born: 14 April 1943 (age 83)
- Party: Communist Party of India (Marxist)

Kanti Bhusan Gangopadhyay (known as Kanti Ganguly) is an Indian politician, belonging to the Communist Party of India (Marxist). He served as a minister in the Left Front government of West Bengal.

He was initially minister in charge of Sunderbans Development and after the death of Subhas Chakraborty in 2009, he was also allotted the portfolio of sports and youth welfare.

The son of the late Bhuban Mohan Gangopadhyay, he is a commerce graduate.

He was elected to state assembly in 2001 and 2006 from Mathurapur.
