= Buddhadeb Bhattacharjee =

Chief Minister of West Bengal from 2000 to 2011

Comrade Buddhadeb Bhattacharjee
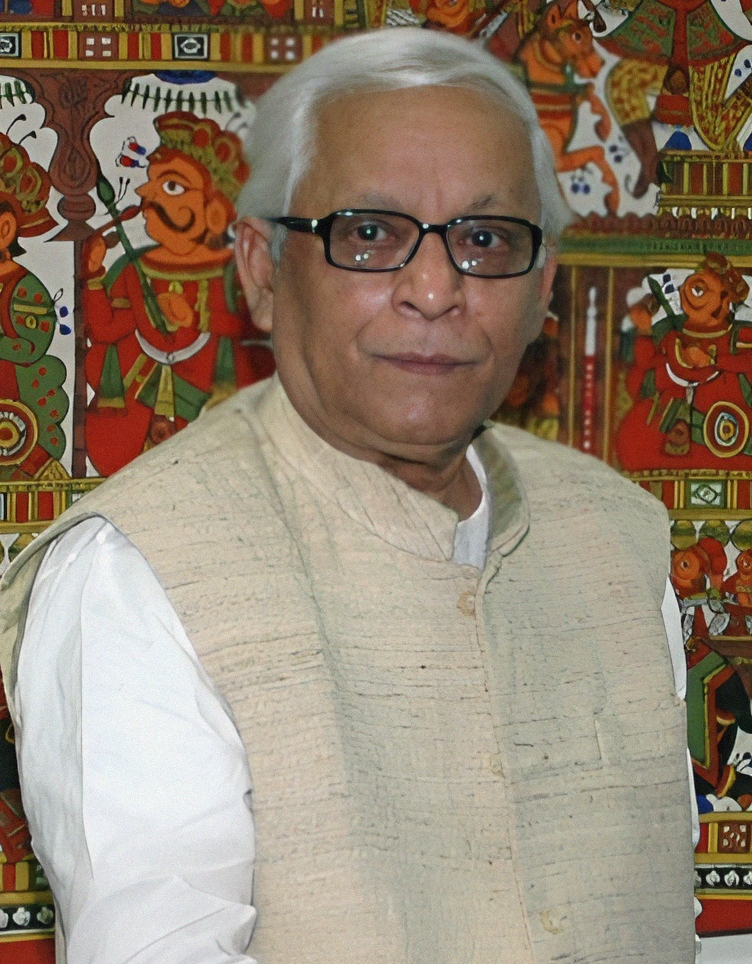
- Bhattacharjee in 2009

7th Chief Minister of West Bengal
- In office 6 November 2000 – 19 May 2011 (Note: resigned on 13 May but remained as care-taker Chief Minister until Mamata Banerjee took oath on 20 May.)
- Governor: List: Viren J. Shah Gopalkrishna Gandhi Devanand Konwar (acting) M. K. Narayanan
- Cabinet: Bhattacharjee I Bhattacharjee II; Bhattacharjee III
- Preceded by: Jyoti Basu
- Succeeded by: Mamata Banerjee

3rd Deputy Chief Minister of West Bengal
- In office 12 January 1999 – 5 November 2000
- Chief Minister: Jyoti Basu
- Preceded by: Bijoy Singh Nahar
- Succeeded by: Vacant

Member of Polit Bureau, Communist Party of India (Marxist)
- In office 2002 – 2015
Cabinet Minister, West Bengal
Minister of Home Affairs & Police
In office
1996–2011
Minister of Information and Culture
In office
1987–2011
In office
1977–1982
Minister of Urban Development and Municipal Affairs
In office
1987–1996
Legislative offices
Member of Legislative Assembly, West Bengal
In office 1987–2011
Preceded by	Ashok Mitra
Succeeded by	Manish Gupta
Constituency	Jadavpur
In office 1977–1982
Preceded by	Prafulla Kanti Ghosh
Succeeded by	Prafulla Kanti Ghosh
Constituency	Cossipur

Personal details
- Born: 1 March 1944 Calcutta, Bengal Presidency, British India
- Died: 8 August 2024 (aged 80) Kolkata, West Bengal, India
- Cause of death: Chronic obstructive pulmonary disease
- Party: Communist Party of India (Marxist)
- Spouse: Meera Bhattacharjee
- Relations: Sukanta Bhattacharya (uncle)
- Children: 1
- Education: Presidency College

Buddhadeb Bhattacharjee (1 March 1944 – 8 August 2024) was an Indian communist politician, statesman and a member of the Politburo of the Communist Party of India (Marxist), who served as the 7th Chief Minister of West Bengal from 2000 to 2011. In a political career over five decades, he became one of the senior leaders of Communist Party of India (Marxist) (CPI(M)) during his regime.

Bhattacharjee described himself as a "communist compromising with capitalism" for promoting industrialisation in West Bengal, but his efforts were undermined by controversies. He was known for his relatively open policies regarding business, in contrast with the previous financial policies of the CPI(M), which were primarily anti-capitalist. However, he faced strong land acquisition protests and allegations about violence against the protesters. This led Bhattacharjee to lose the 2011 elections, resulting in the fall of Left Front's 34 years of rule in West Bengal.

== Early life ==
Bhattacharjee was born in British Raj India on 1 March 1944 in Calcutta to a Bengali Brahmin family. His grandfather, Krishnachandra Smrititirtha was a Sanskrit scholar who had composed a priestly manual named Purohit Darpan, which remains popular with Bengali Hindu Bramins in West Bengal. Buddhadeb's father, Nepalchandra, did not enter into the priesthood and was involved with the family publication, Saraswat Library, devoted to selling Hindu religious material. Poet Sukanta Bhattacharya was Nepalchandra's cousin. A former student of Sailendra Sircar Vidyalaya, Buddhadeb studied Bengali literature at the Presidency College, Kolkata, and secured his B.A. degree in Bengali (Honours). He then joined Adarsh Shankha Vidya Mandir school at Dum Dum as a teacher.

== Political career ==
=== Initial career (1966–1971) ===
Bhattacharjee joined the CPI(M) as a primary member in 1966. Besides taking active part in the food movement, he also supported cause of Vietnam in 1968. In 1968, he was elected as the state secretary of the Democratic Youth Federation, the youth wing of the CPI(M), that was later merged into the Democratic Youth Federation of India. He served in the position till 1981, when he was succeeded by Boren Basu. He was mentored by Promode Dasgupta.

=== Recognition, election as MLA and ministership (1972–2000) ===
Bhattacharjee was elected to the state committee of CPI(M) in 1972 and was inducted in the state secretariat in 1982.

From 1977 to 1982, he was elected as the MLA of Kashipur-Belgachia. Bhattacharjee served as the Minister of Information and Public Relations in the West Bengal Cabinet between 1977 and 1982.

In 1982, he lost the assembly elections from Cossipur constituency in 1982 by a slender margin. He was made a permanent invitee to the central committee of CPI(M) in 1984 and was made a member in 1985.

Later, in 1987, he became the MLA of Jadavpur and continued to represent the constituency till 2011. He was re-inducted in the cabinet in 1987 as the Minister of Information and Cultural Affairs. He also held departments of Urban Development and Municipal Affairs.

He was included in the cabinet in 1991 as a minister, with the portfolios of Information and Cultural Affairs and Urban Development and Municipal Affairs. However, he abruptly resigned from his position in September 1993, following differences with then Chief Minister of West Bengal, Jyoti Basu, regarding the functioning of the administration and the alleged issue of corruption. Notably, he remarked that Basu's cabinet was a "council of thieves". He returned to the cabinet a few months later.

Following the 1996 West Bengal election, Bhattacharjee was handed the responsibility of the home and police department, owing to the declining health of the elderly Chief Minister Basu. In 1999, he was made the Deputy Chief minister of West Bengal.

=== Chief Minister of West Bengal (2001–2011) ===
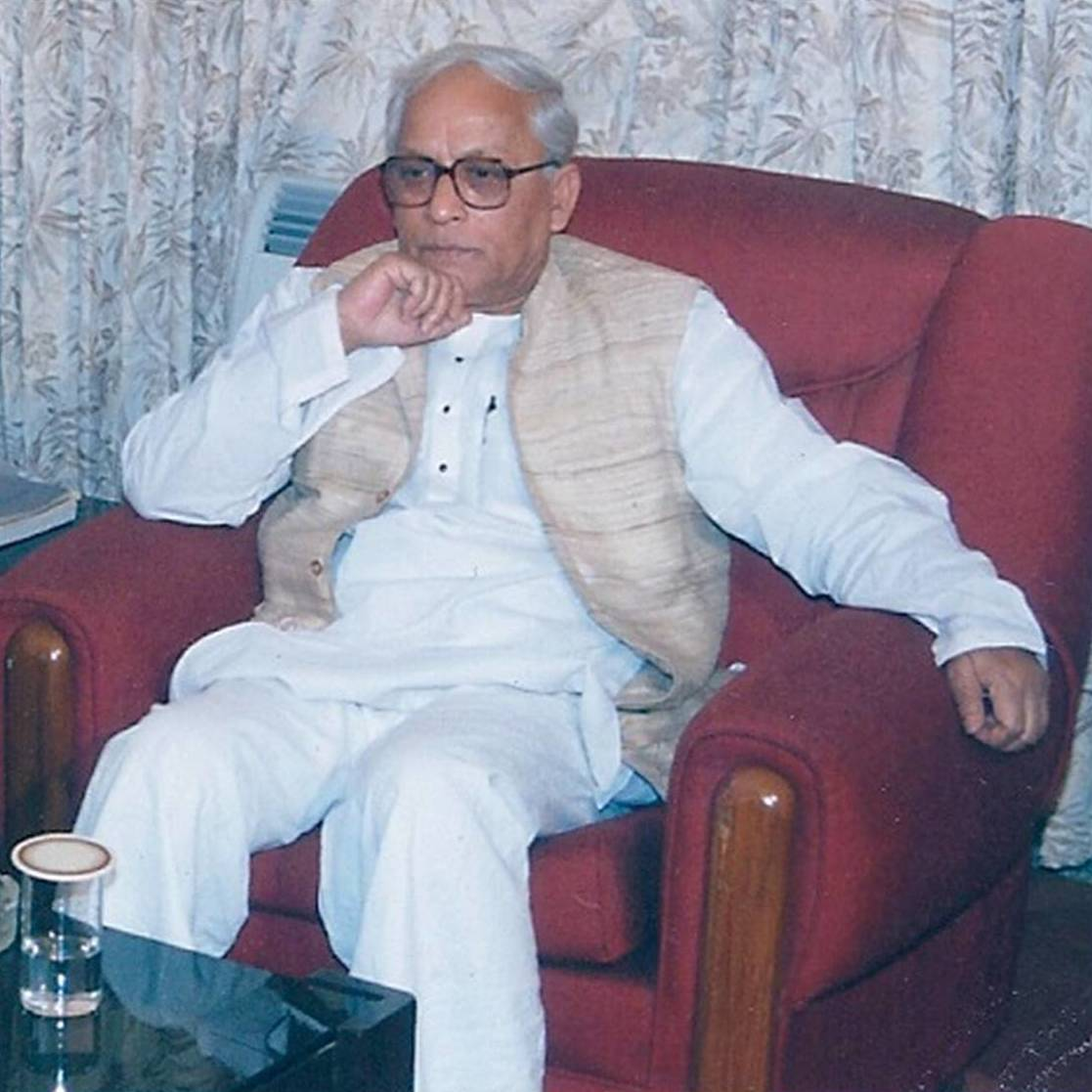
Bhattacharjee in 2001

On 6 November 2000, he was elevated to the position of Chief Minister after the resignation of Basu. In 2002, he was elected to the politburo of CPI(M).

Bhattacharjee was elected Chief Minister of West Bengal and was sworn in in a solemn ceremony at Raj Bhawan. As Chief Minister, he led the CPI(M)-led Left Front to two successive election victories in 2001 and 2006. In 2001, the Left Front secured 199 out of 294 assembly seats and in 2006, it improved the tally to 235 out of 294 seats.

The tenure of Bhattacharjee saw major incidents of violence perpetrated by the cadres of the ruling CPI(M) like the Chhoto Angaria massacre, the Netai killings and the Dhantala case. There was also an escalation of Maoist attacks in the state, the most notable being the attack on a police camp at Silda, violence in Lalgarh and the Jnaneswari Express train derailment. Bhattacharya himself survived an assassination attempt by Maoists in 2008. Bhattacharya's government was also criticised for giving in to the demands of extremist elements among the Muslim society to expel the exiled Bangladeshi author Taslima Nasreen out of the state in 2007.

Bhattacharjee started an industrialisation drive in West Bengal to bring in more investment and jobs in the states. Under his government, West Bengal saw investments in the IT and services sector. Bhattacharjee described himself as a "communist compromising with capitalism" for promoting industrialisation in the state, though his efforts did not succeed to the extent he had expected due to ensuing controversies.

Notable among the invited projects was that of the production of the world's cheapest car, the Tata Nano, in Singur, a small town near Kolkata. Other notable proposals included the country's largest integrated steel plant in Salboni by the Jindal group. Another notable proposed project was a chemical hub at Nayachar, after it had faced resistance from farmers in Nandigram.

However, his plans were perceived negatively, and his party, along with its front partners, suffered heavy losses in the 2009 Indian general election. In the 2011 state assembly election, he was defeated at Jadavpur by the former Chief Secretary of his own government, and the Trinamool congress candidate Manish Gupta by 16,684 votes. He became the second West Bengal Chief Minister to lose an election from his own constituency, after Prafulla Chandra Sen in 1967. The Left Front saw a drubbing, securing just 62 seats out of 294. He resigned as Chief Minister on 13 May 2011.

== Singur Tata Nano controversy and Nandigram violence ==
Events during his tenure as Chief Minister included attempts to industrialise West Bengal thwarted by the TATA's Tata Motors leaving Bengal in the face of the joint protests of the Trinamool Congress, Socialist Unity Centre of India, and Indian National Congress, the land acquisition dispute in Singur, the Nandigram incident, and the Netai incident.

In January 2006 the Supreme Court of India issued notices to Left Front Government ministers including Buddhadeb Bhattacharjee and others in relation to land allotments made in the Salt Lake City township in Kolkata.

The Government of Buddhadeb Bhattacharjee came under heavy criticism for police action against demonstrators in Nandigram in East Midnapore. He was criticised not only by opposition parties (such as the Trinamool Congress, INC, PDS, BJP, CPI(ML)L, CRLI and others) and other Left Front coalition allies like CPI, RSP and AIFB, who threatened to back out from the ministry on this issue, but also by his mentor and the former chief minister of the state, Jyoti Basu.

On 15 March 2007, Basu criticised Bhattacharjee for failing to restrain the police in Nandigram. Bhattacharjee expressed regret for the shootings, but claimed that he permitted police action because Nandigram was an "area where there had been no rule of law and no presence of an administration for not one, two or 10 days but for two-and-a-half months, and many hundreds of villagers left Nandigram, and took shelter in a state relief camp outside Nandigram." Actually Buddhadeb Bhattacharjee declared that land in Nandigram would not be acquired by ordering the Nandigram notification to be torn apart. Still police were not allowed to enter Nandigram. Roads were dug up, preventing administration from entering the area.

The CPI(M) declared that they were totally behind Bhattacharjee and had drawn up "plans" to placate his critics in the Left Front. His government was also criticised by Left supporters for failing to protect the Left party workers (including his own party CPI(M)) who came under assault from political opponents - both right wing and ultra-left wing Maoists during the post-Nandigram turmoil until the end of 7th Left Front Government.

== Electoral history ==
Bhattacharjee was elected as Member of Legislative Assembly from Cossipur (Vidhan Sabha constituency) once and from Jadavpur (Vidhan Sabha constituency) for five consecutive terms.

Election Year	House	Constituency	Party affiliation	Result
1977	West Bengal Legislative Assembly	Cossipur	Communist Party of India	Won
1982	West Bengal Legislative Assembly	Cossipur	Communist Party of India	Lost
1987	West Bengal Legislative Assembly	Jadavpur	Communist Party of India	Won
1991	West Bengal Legislative Assembly	Jadavpur	Communist Party of India	Won
1996	West Bengal Legislative Assembly	Jadavpur	Communist Party of India	Won
2001	West Bengal Legislative Assembly	Jadavpur	Communist Party of India	Won
2006	West Bengal Legislative Assembly	Jadavpur	Communist Party of India	Won
2011	West Bengal Legislative Assembly	Jadavpur	Communist Party of India	Lost

== Later life ==
Despite his calls to be relieved of party responsibilities, Bhattacharjee was retained as a member of the Politburo and the Central Committee in the 20th party congress, organised at Kozhikode in 2012.

He was relieved of his posts on the Polit Bureau and Central Committee at the 21st party congress, organised at Vishakhapatnam in 2015. The party congress elected him as a special invitee to the Central Committee. However, he was persuaded to remain a member of the state committee and the state secretariat till 2018. In 2018, due to continuing ill-health he stepped down from the state committee and the state secretariat. He was later named as a special invitee to the state committee. In 2019, he made an attempt to attend a mega-rally at Brigade Parade ground in Kolkata, however, due to breathing difficulties he could not appear on the stage and remained seated in his car.

=== Padma Bhushan rejection ===
In January 2022, the Government of India awarded Bhattacharjee with the Padma Bhushan, the third-highest civilian award in India. However, he declined the award and claimed that he had not been informed about the award. He said a call was made to his residence earlier in the day, while adding there is no provision of taking consent for giving Padma awards.

== Personal life ==
Bhattacharjee was married to Meera Bhattacharjee. Together, they had a child who underwent gender surgery and is now known as Suchetan Bhattacharjee. Bhattacharjee was renowned for his frugal lifestyle. He was also a scholar widely read and had acquaintance with literature of the world. Bhattacharjee was fond of dogs and had several pets during his lifetime, and was also seen feeding and petting the stray dogs in his locality quite often. He was an inveterate music lover and quite knowledgeable about Indian classical music. He also had a quiet and quite unexpected sense of humour. The family lived in a two-room apartment in Ballygunge, Kolkata. Bhattacharjee operated as Chief Minister from the same residence. Although belonging to a family of priests, Bhattacharjee was an avowed atheist, in accordance with the principles of communism.

== Death ==
Bhattacharjee died from chronic obstructive pulmonary disease in Kolkata, on 8 August 2024, at the age of 80.

== Works ==
- Duhsomoy (transl. The Bad Times) (1993): Buddhadeb Bhattacharya's play deals with the communal tension between Hindus and Muslims in the aftermath of the demolition of the Babri Masjid.
- Biponno jaahaajer ek nabiker golpo (1994): Translation of The Story of a Shipwrecked Sailor by Gabriel García Márquez
- Ei aami Mayakovsky (1994): Translated works of Russian-Soviet poet Vladimir Mayakovsky
- Chilite gopone (1996): Translation of Clandestine in Chile by Gabriel García Márquez
- Hridayer shobdohin jyotsnar bhitor (transl. Into the Silent Moonlight of Heart (1997): Anthology of literary criticism on poetry penned by Jibanananda Das
- Phire dekha (prothom porbo) (transl. Looking back (first part)) (2015)
- Phire dekha (dwitiyo porbo) (transl. Looking back (second part)) (2017)
- Nazi Germanyr jonmo o mrityu (transl. The Rise and Fall of Nazi Germany) (2018)
- Swarger niche mohabishrankhola (transl. Chaos under heaven) (2019)

== Notes ==
Political offices
Preceded by Jyoti Basu	Chief Minister of West Bengal; 2000–2011	Succeeded by Mamata Banerjee
