= Susanta Ghosh =

Indian politician

Sushanta Ghosh

District secretary of Communist Party of India (Marxist), Paschim Medinipur
- In office 17 February 2022 – 25 February 2025

Minister of Paschimanchal Unnanyan Department Government of West Bengal
- In office 2006–2011

Minister of State Labour Department Government of West Bengal
- In office 2001–2006

Minister of State of Transport Department Government of West Bengal
- In office 1996–2001

Member of the West Bengal legislative assembly
- In office 1985–2016

Personal details
- Party: Communist Party of India (Marxist)
- Occupation: Politician

Susanta Ghosh is an Indian politician belonging to CPI(M). He was a state cabinet minister of West Bengal in the Government of West Bengal for a long time and was the Member of the Legislative Assembly from Garbeta from 1987 to 2016. In the 2006, 2001, 1996, 1991 and 1987 state assembly elections, he won the 220 Garbeta East assembly seat.

== Political career and controversies ==
Ghosh emerged as a CPI(M) leader in an era of violent politics in several areas of rural Bengal and is a known "hardliner" face across the state. Ghosh's area of West Midnapore district has long been the hub of violence directed against members of the political opposed parties.

Ghosh was first elected to the Legislative Assembly from Garbeta East Assembly Constituency in a by election. He continued to win successive elections from the same constituency until 2011.

In 2011, he contested from the newly created Garbeta Assembly Constituency and was returned to the assembly with an over 20,000 vote margin. This is significant as he was one of the seven Left Front ministers from the outgoing cabinet to be re-elected out of 44. Left Front, which has ruled West Bengal from 1977 to 2011, faced a drubbing and was reduced to 62 from 235 in a house of 294.

Despite his re-election, he was sidelined in CPI(M) due to his alleged associations with criminal cases and court-induced ban on his entry in his own district. At this time he was also in the minority in the party, which was under control of "soft-liners".

In 2020, he was also suspended for three months from the party on accusations of indiscipline. The party had initially decided to expel him, however, in the face of severe protests from youth leaders the punishment was reduced.

He returned to Garbeta in December 2020 after his suspension was lifted. He contested 2021 West Bengal Legislative Assembly Elections from Salboni Assembly constituency, but was defeated.

On 17 February 2022, he was elected as District Secretary of Paschim Medinipur unit of CPI(M). He was elected to the West Bengal state committee of CPI(M).

=== Inflammatory speeches ===
In November 2010, Ghosh was himself in the news for suggesting that the CPI(M) cadres should beat up Trinamool workers ("Prem noy, oder pyadani din.", No love, just thrash them).

=== Political controversies ===
In 2002, seven Trinamool Congress workers went missing from Keshpur in West Midnapore. While two bodies were recovered, five others were never seen again.

At the time, CPI(M) had been governing West Bengal for several decades. After nine years, when Trinamool Congress came to power, the area where the bodies were suspected to have been buried was dug up and the skeletons were discovered. One of the skeletons was identified by his son based on its shirt, and an FIR was filed against Ghosh. It was strange that the inners discovered on the skeletons were brand new, which is why the case was dismissed, due to lack of merit and evidence. The case came to be known as the Garbeta Skeleton case.

Meanwhile, the CPI-M party newspaper, Ganashakti claimed that the charges were politically motivated. Shyamal Acharya, who had filed the FIR, had been arrested in 2009 for storing firearms unlawfully in his house. Ghosh's confidential secretary Debasis Pain and two CPM workers have also been arrested in the case. The police claim that these three persons have said that the murders were planned by Ghosh, and that he was personally present when the bodies were being buried.

"The witness, Gobinda Majhi of Godapiashole village in Keshpur, has told us that the five Trinamul supporters were being chased by a large group of CPM activists", the CID officer said. "The five of them rushed into Gobinda's house. But they were dragged out by the CPM activists, hacked and shot in the courtyard of his house."

On 3 September, another key accomplice who had gone into hiding, the CPI(M) local committee secretary Shankar Shau, was arrested from Kolkata. Shau, who had been the headmaster of Benachapra Primary School, had been expelled from the party for corruption in 2007, but was re-instated at Ghosh's insistence.

=== Arrest ===
In August 2011, Ghosh was arrested for the murder of seven persons, and spent around six months in jail while several bail applications were turned down by the high court. He managed to obtain bail from the Supreme Court in February 2012 and was given a hero's welcome. However, he was barred from entering Paschim Medinipur for the next decade. On 6 December 2020, he returned to Garhbeta in his home after the Supreme Court lifted the bar on him.
