= Jyoti Basu =

Chief Minister of West Bengal from 1977 to 2000

Comrade Jyoti Basu
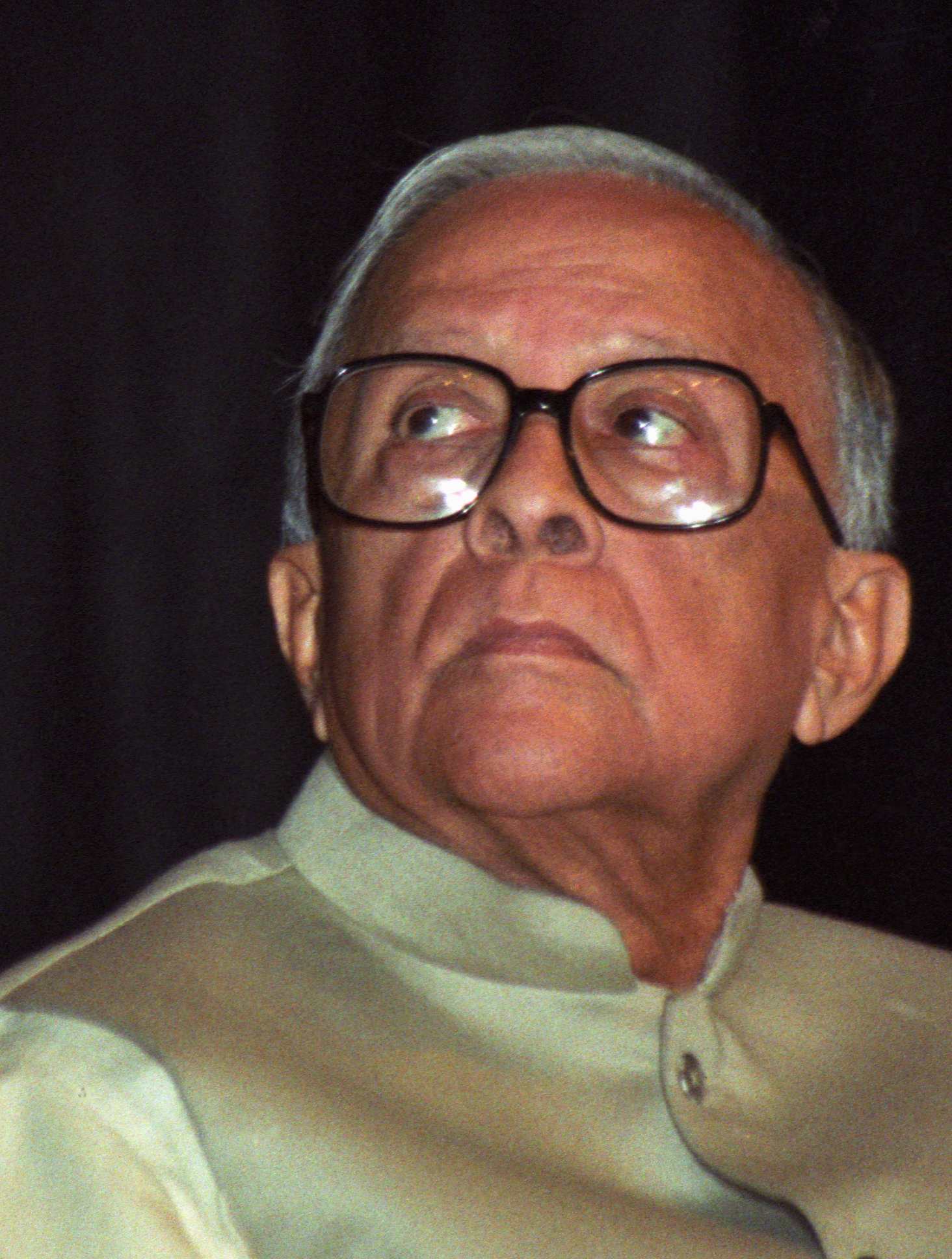

6th Chief Minister of West Bengal
- In office 21 June 1977 – 5 November 2000
- Governor: See list: Anthony Lancelot Dias Tribhuvan Narain Singh B. D. Pande Anant Sharma Satish Chandra (acting) Uma Shankar Dikshit Saiyid Nurul Hasan T. V. Rajeswar B. Satyanarayan Reddy (additional charge) K. V. Raghunatha Reddy A. R. Kidwai Shyamal Kumar Sen Viren J. Shah
- Deputy: Buddhadeb Bhattacharjee (from 12 January 1999)
- Cabinet: Basu I Basu II; Basu III; Basu IV; Basu V
- Preceded by: President's rule (Siddhartha Shankar Ray as Chief Minister)
- Succeeded by: Buddhadeb Bhattacharjee

1st Deputy Chief Minister of West Bengal
- In office 25 February 1969 – 16 March 1970
- Chief Minister: Ajoy Mukherjee
- Preceded by: Vacant
- Succeeded by: Bijoy Singh Nahar
- In office 1 March 1967 – 21 November 1967
- Chief Minister: Ajoy Mukherjee
- Preceded by: Office established
- Succeeded by: Vacant

Member of Politburo, Communist Party of India (Marxist)
- In office 1964–2008

Leader of the Opposition in West Bengal Legislative Assembly
- In office 1957–1967
- Preceded by: Office established
- Succeeded by: Khagendra Nath Dasgupta

State Secretary of the Communist Party of India, West Bengal
- In office 1953 – 1960
Other ministerial offices in state cabinet
Minister of Home Affairs
In office
21 June 1977 – 1996
In office
25 February 1969 – 16 March 1970
Minister of Transport
In office
1 March 1967 – 21 November 1967
Minister of Planning and Development
In office
21 June 1977 – 5 November 2000
Minister of Finance
In office
1982–1984
In office
1 March 1967 – 21 November 1967
Minister of General Administration
In office
1977–2000
In office
1969–1970
Legislative offices
Member of West Bengal Legislative Assembly
In office 1977–2001
Preceded by	Constituency established
Succeeded by	Sonali Guha
Constituency	Satgachhia
In office 1952–1972
Preceded by	Constituency established
Succeeded by	Shiba Pada Bhattacharjee
Constituency	Baranagar
Member of Bengal Legislative Assembly
In office 1946–1947
Succeeded by	Office abolished
Constituency	Railway Employees

Personal details
- Born: Jyotirindra Basu; 8 July 1914 Dacca, Bengal Presidency, British India
- Died: 17 January 2010 (aged 95) Kolkata, West Bengal, India
- Cause of death: Pneumonia
- Party: Communist Party of India (Marxist) (1964–2010); Communist Party of India (1940–1964)
- Spouses: Basanti Basu (m. 1940; died 1942) Kamala Basu (m. 1948; died 2003)
- Children: 1
- Education: Presidency College, Kolkata; University College, London; London School of Economics; Middle Temple
- Website: https://jyotibasu.net/

Jyoti Basu (born Jyotirindra Basu or Jyoti Bose; 8 July 1914 – 17 January 2010) was an Indian Marxist theorist, communist activist, and politician. He was one of the most prominent leaders of the Communist movement in India. He served as the 6th and longest serving Chief Minister of West Bengal from 1977 to 2000. He was one of the founding members of the Communist Party of India (Marxist). He was a member of Politburo of the party from its formation in 1964 until 2008. He was also a member of the West Bengal Legislative Assembly 11 times. In his political career, spanning over seven decades, he was noted to have been India's longest serving chief minister under elected democracy at the time of his resignation. (Note: Currently, Jyoti Basu is the third longest serving Chief Minister in the history of India, after Pawan Kumar Chamling of Sikkim and Naveen Patnaik of Odisha.) He declined the post of Prime Minister after the 1996 Indian general election, after the CPM refused to let him head a multi-party coalition as it would not be able to implement Marxist programs, and relinquished the prime ministership to Deve Gowda.

== Early life and education ==
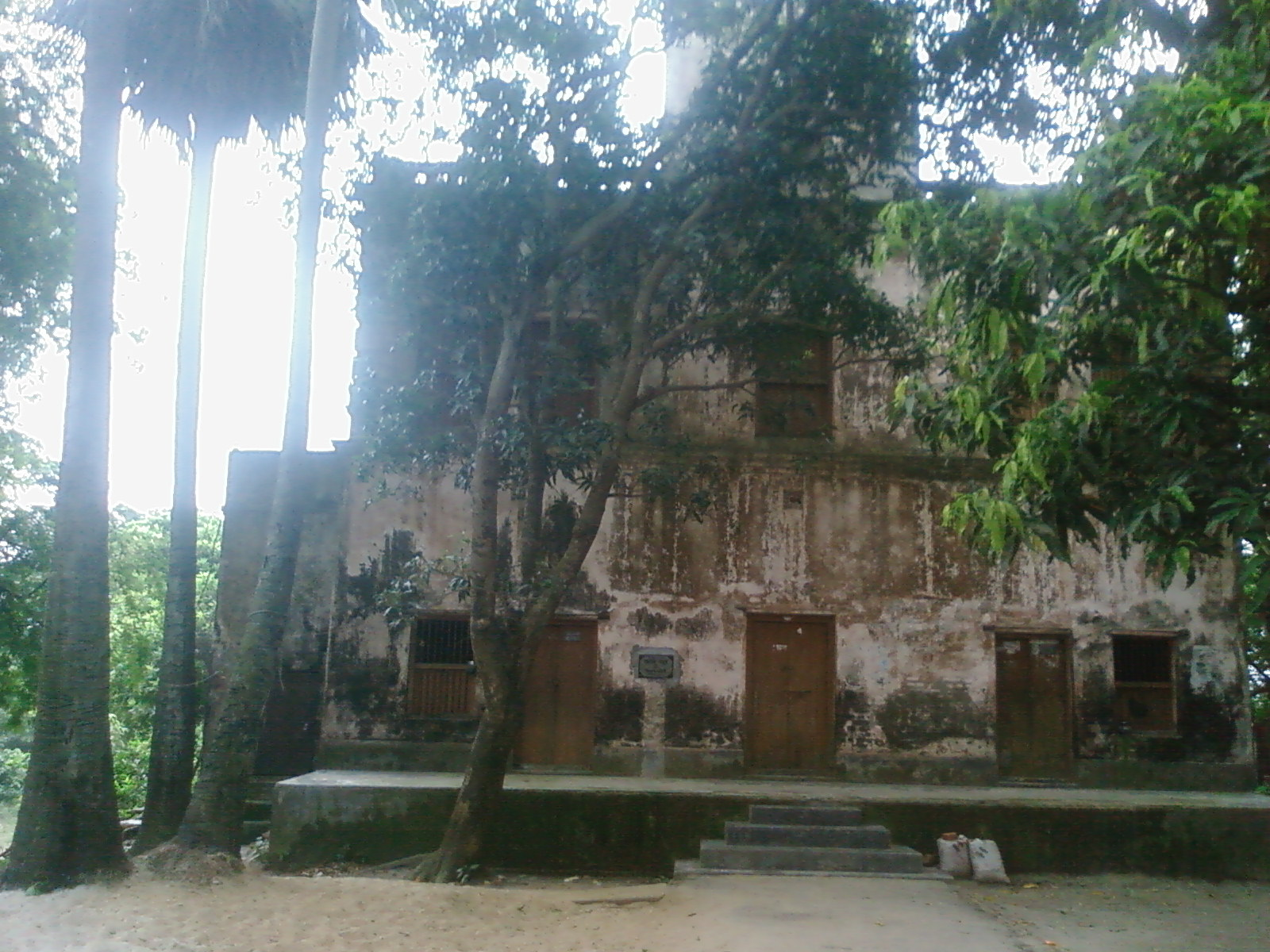
Paternal house of Jyoti Basu at Barudi in Narayanganj, Bangladesh

Jyotirindra Basu was born on 8 July 1914 to an upper middle class Bengali Kayastha Hindu family at 43/1 Harrison Road, Calcutta, British India. His father, Nishikanta Basu was a doctor whose hometown was the village of Barudi, Narayanganj in Dhaka District of the Bengal Presidency while his mother Hemlata Basu was a housewife. He grew up in a joint family and was the youngest of three siblings. His family nickname was Gana. One of his uncles, Nilinkanta Basu was a judge in the Calcutta High Court. His family also retained ancestral lands in Barudi where Jyoti Basu is described to have spent part of his childhood. The Barudi home of Basu was later turned into a library after his death, reportedly at his wishes.

While residing at the Futnani Chambers, Basu's schooling began in 1920 at Loreto School Kindergarten in Dharmatala, Calcutta. His father shortened his name from Jyotirindra to Jyoti during the time of admission. However, three years later he was shifted to the St. Xavier's School, Calcutta. He completed his intermediate education from St. Xaviers in 1932. Subsequently, he took an undergraduate course in English from the prestigious Presidency College. Following his graduation in 1935, he acquired admission in the University College, London (UCL) to study Law and received the degree at Middle Temple on 26 January 1940. He had already left for India by then and received the qualification in absentia.

During his stay in London, he became involved in political discourse and activism for the first time. Besides his general curriculum at UCL, he would attend various lectures on political organisation, constitutional law, international law and anthropology at the London School of Economics (LSE). Due to which, he is also credited as an alumnus of LSE. He had reportedly attended the lectures of the political theorist and economist, Harold Laski and was influenced by his anti-fascism. By 1937, Basu was an active member of several anti-imperialist Indian students unions such as the India League and the Federation of Indian Students, and had become acquainted with young Indian communists such as Bhupesh Gupta and Snehangshu Acharya.

In 1938, he had also become a founding member of the London Majlis and subsequently its first secretary. Apart from raising public opinion for the cause of Indian independence, one of the primary functions of the Majlis was to arrange receptions for Indian leaders who were visiting England at the time. Through the Majlis, Basu came into contact with various Indian independence movement leaders such as Subhas Chandra Bose, Jawaharlal Nehru, Krishna Menon and Vijaya Lakshmi Pandit.

== Before 1947 and independence movement ==
On returning to Calcutta, India in early 1940, Basu enrolled as a lawyer at the Calcutta High Court, and married Basanti Ghosh. Some sources say by then he had a deep relationship with his sister in law whom he married later. However, in the same year, he also inducted himself as an activist affiliated with the Communist Party of India (CPI). His entry into the communist movement at the time had reportedly been in opposition to the wishes of his relatively well off family. Following the Meerut conspiracy in 1929, the Communist Party had also been made illegal by British authorities, as a result Basu was initially involved in providing liaison and safe houses for underground Communist leaders in the Independence movement. However soon afterwards, he also became involved in organising railway workers, planning strikes and is described to have preferred direct action over ballot box in the initial years.

In 1941, Basu was appointed the party secretary of the Bengal Assam Railway (now Bangladesh Railway and Northeast Frontier Railway) and tasked with organising a workers union. By May 1943, he had become the representative of the Calcutta Port Engineering Workers' Union in the All India Trade Union Congress, while the Bengal Assam Railway Workers Union under him increased its membership to over 4,000 with union members present in Dacca, Calcutta, Kanchrapara, Mymensingh, Rangpur and Assam.

In the following Bengal famine of 1943, the members of the Communist Party including Basu were involved in famine relief work. The party also organised "People's Food Committees" which would attempt to force hoarders into releasing their stocks for distribution; Basu participated in the organisation of such committees in Calcutta and Midnapore. According to Basu's testimony, they only had a small organisation at the time and did the best they could while the famine took the lives of over 3 million people. Basu was elected to the Bengal provincial committee of the Communist Party in the same year. He would later participate in the Tebhaga movement between 1945 and 1947 that sought to end the food crisis in Bengal, in a supportive capacity as a railway unionist.

By 1944, Basu had started leading the trade union activities of the Communist Party. He was again delegated to organise labourers working for the East Indian Railway Company (now Eastern Railway and East Central Railway) in order to further the interests of the Indian workers and is described to have been instrumental in the formation of the Bengal Nagpur Railway (now South Eastern Railway, East Coast Railway and South East Central Railway) Workers' Union of which he became the general secretary. With the merger of the Bengal Nagpur Railway Workers' Union and the Bengal Delhi Railroad Workers' Union in the same year, Basu was elected the general secretary of the new combined union. He would also be elected as the secretary of the All India Railwaymen's Federation.

In 1946, Basu was appointed by the Communist Party to contest as the candidate for the Railway Employees' constituency in the Bengal Legislative Assembly. He subsequently defeated Humayun Kabir of the Indian National Congress and was elected to the assembly. He is noted to have given a "soul stirring speech" on the presiding food crisis in the Bengal Assembly; according to him the only means of solving the issue was to completely dismantle the Zamindari system and the Permanent Settlement agreement, and to drive out the British with haste. Basu had also organised a continuous railway strike in support of the 1946 Royal Indian Navy ratings revolt, and later secured the release of various political prisoners on 24 July 1946.

== Communist Party of India (1947–1964) ==
=== Interim government in West Bengal (1947–1952) ===
Following the partition of India, Basu remained as the member of the now divided West Bengal Legislative Assembly. Prafulla Chandra Ghosh of the conservative Indian National Congress became the first Chief Minister of West Bengal. The Congress however faced civil unrest from the onset; hartals, civil disobedience and demonstrations had soon become the order of the day in the face of a Congress government that was seen as unresponsive to the social and economic distress that was widespread in the state at the time.

The new assembly therefore instituted the West Bengal Special Powers Act 1947 modelled on the Defence of India Act 1915; the act gave unchecked power to the bureaucracy and the police to suppress public agitations allowing law enforcement to detain individuals for up to 6 months without trial on reasonable grounds, which was justified on the grounds of maintaining the law and order situation. The bill was inordinately criticised and opposed by Basu who declared that "it seeks to perpetuate (the undemocratic rule)". In 1948, the government sought to extend the act through the West Bengal Security Ordinance which would remove the restriction of "reasonable grounds" for imprisonment. According to Basu, the new ordinance had made it clear that the Congress intended to establish a police state in West Bengal. By this time, the state of West Bengal had already been declared as a "problem province" by the Congress administration and Bidhan Chandra Roy replaced as the new chief minister.

During the presentation of the ordinance as a bill in the assembly, Basu attempted to oppose it on a clause by clause basis but in vain due to the dominance of the Congress in the assembly, only the two communist legislators Ratanlal Brahmin and Basu along with independent members opposed the bill. Basu argued that while the Congress spoke of Kisan Raj (transl. Farmer's Rule), it had made no progress in abolishing the Zamindari system and had instead developed vested interests with the Zamindars (transl. Landlords) themselves which resulted in the persistence of poor socioeconomic conditions and the employment of repressive tactics against agitations.

In the following period the Communist Party was made illegal by the government on allegations of trying to incite on open rebellion and Basu repeatedly arrested as a result; on 24 March 1948, he was imprisoned for a period of three months and released on the orders of the Calcutta High Court. In December 1948, he married a second time, but soon went into hiding and kept changing residences due to an ongoing crackdown on communist leaders. For a period at the time, he had reportedly lived alongside Indrajit Gupta, who would later become the Home Minister of India. In 1949, Basu had remained as the vice-president of the All India Railwaymen's Federation. In the same year, the federation had held a strike ballot which displayed overwhelming support for a railway strike on 9 March in demand of better wages and working conditions in the Indian Railways. The strike notice was however withdraw by the socialist leadership of the federation to whom the government had shown a reconciliatory attitude but the communist members under the leadership of Basu insisted on proceeding with the strike which resulted in disciplinary action being taken against the communists. Subsequently, the government also decided to crack down on the communist leadership by arresting 118 leaders involved in the railway sector in West Bengal including Basu. In the aftermath, the strike was a failure as the administration mobilised troops and police force to prevent any disruption from communist influenced union members.

After the adoption of the Constitution of India in 1950, the ban on the Communist Party was lifted on the orders of the Calcutta High Court. In September 1951, Congress attempted to renew the Security Act with the introduction of the West Bengal Security (Amendment) Bill of 1951 which raised criticism in the assembly on the lines of creating an environment of fear and intimidation on the eve of the first elections to the assembly which were to be held in December. Although the bill was passed once again despite Basu's persistent opposition, this time he had garnered the support of a number of Gandhian Congress members including from the former chief minister and architect of the bill, P. C. Ghosh, all of whom had resigned from the party and formed their own Kisan Mazdoor Praja Party by the time of voting. In same year, the Bengali daily organ Swadhinata of the Communist Party was resumed and Basu appointed as the president of its editorial board. The legislative assembly elections for 1951 were also held by the Election Commission in March 1952 instead.

=== First Assembly and agitations (1952–1957) ===
In the West Bengal State Assembly election of 1952, Basu was elected as the representative of the Baranagar constituency and the Communist Party emerged as the second-largest party in the assembly. Following which Basu was unanimously elected as the legislative party leader of the CPI in West Bengal. In the following year, he was also elected as the secretary of the state committee of the CPI. The ensuing period in West Bengal was marked with the rise of a number of anti-establishment mass movements, in which Basu is described to have played a key role.

Even after the Independence of India, the Calcutta Tramways Company had remained a British-owned company which operated in partnership with the Government of West Bengal. On 25 June 1953, the company announced a fare hike for second class passengers that was to be implemented from 1 July onwards, which was supported by the West Bengal Government. In response to the move, the "Tram and Bus Fare Enhancement Resistance Committee" was formed in which Basu was inducted as the representative of the Communist Party. The Calcutta Tramway Union announced their support for the committee and published statistical data through the Swadhinata which displayed that the company was privy to "swelling profits" concluding the fare hike to be "absolutely uncalled for". From the day of implementation of the new fares, the city underwent a series of agitations which began with disobedience to pay the new prices and caused severe losses for the company, culminating into police deployment and arrests of hundreds of disobedient passengers.

Basu was arrested on 4 July alongside Ganesh Ghosh and Subodh Banerjee who were also involved in the agitations, he was bailed out the following day. On 7 July, during a large picketing of the company headquarters at Mango Lane in Calcutta, five Resistance Committee leaders including Basu met with A.C.T Blease who was the agent of the company in India and presenting him with the demands of unilateral withdrawal of the fare hike. On the evening of the same day, 500 citizens including Basu were arrested under the Preventive Detention Act which had been earlier implemented through the Security Act. Over the course of the month the movement faced progressively increased police action and subsequently heightened civil unrest spreading all across West Bengal with general strikes, mass demonstrations, tramway boycotts to hunger strikes from imprisoned agitators and even violent confrontations between the police and agitators on the streets. In the end, the five committee leaders including Basu were released on 26 July, the fare hike scrapped by the Chief Minister Bidhan Chandra Roy on 31 July and the remaining imprisoned agitators released by 2 August.

In January 1954, the Communist party held its third congress in Madurai and Basu was elected as the new Central Committee member during the congress. In February, Basu became involved in the 1954 teachers' agitation in West Bengal. The All Bengal Teachers Association (ABTA) had been called for implementing the recommendations of the Secondary Board for raising the allowances of secondary school teachers. The association was joined in by various labour unions and opposition parties in support of their demand. The government as a result decided to crack down on the leaders of the agitation but Basu escaped custody and took refuge in the West Bengal Legislature. The police force who were trying to arrest him through the Preventive Detention Act were reluctant to enter the assembly to arrest a legislator. In Basu's testimony, he states that it was easier for him support the agitation from inside the assembly by projecting the police action on the movement without getting arrested.

During the presentation of the recommendation of the States Reorganisation Commission in 1956, a proposal for the merger of Bihar and West Bengal into a single state called Purva Pradesh was floated which was supported by the Indian National Congress. The Communist Party having maintained the stance of supporting linguistic reorganisation of states in India since 1920, was vehemently opposed to the proposal of the merger. The announcement of the proposal caused widespread protests in West Bengal led by students, workers and even peasantry, the Central Committee of the Communist Party held a meeting between 28 January to 4 February protesting the move. Basu and Yogendra Sharma, the secretaries of the state committees of the Communist Party in West Bengal and Bihar respectively issued a joint press statement calling the merger proposal to be "antidemocratic and reactionary".

Basu is noted to have opposed the proposal from both within and outside the assembly, he presided over the mass meeting at Wellington Square in opposition to the proposal and severely criticised the governor's position in support of the proposal. According to his testimony, the proposal was akin to a conspiracy to annihilate the basic identity of Bengal. Basu presented the idea of the proposal as a poll issue for the by-elections of the year, supporting the candidacy of Mohit Mitra who the Central Committee's secretary for linguistic reorganisation and declared that the results should reflect the people's mandate. In the subsequent by-elections, Mohit Mitra won from the Calcutta North East constituency and Lal Behari Das won from the Khejuri constituency, defeating their Congress counterparts by a margin of over 20,000 in both constituencies which caused the Chief Minister Bidhan Chandra Roy to scrap the merger proposal.

Jyoti Basu was one of the leading members of the Communist Party of India (Marxist).

=== Beginning of the food movements (1957–1962) ===
In the West Bengal Legislative Assembly election of 1957, Basu was re-elected as the representative of the Baranagar constituency and the Communist Party returned as the second largest party with an increased representation. As a result, Basu formally became the Leader of Opposition in the assembly. This platform enabled the Communist Party under the leadership of Basu in West Bengal to exacerbate agitations against the prevalent food crisis in West Bengal by acting as the principal opposition on the floor of the assembly, increasing public awareness and providing a united front for agitators to rally around.

Since the beginning of the British Raj, the region of Bengal had suffered from severe food shortages culminating into large-scale famines at times. Following independence of India, the Public Distribution System (PDS) was established and two land reforms were enacted in 1953 and 1955 in West Bengal. However, the implementation of these initiatives and reforms was rife with problems and the agricultural sector had remained in despondency while food shortages continued to afflict a largely impoverished population. The food crisis and general poverty had led to multiple outbursts of public agitations throughout the 1950s which peaked near the end of 1959. The leaders of the Communist Party adopted the twin strategy of organising anti-government mass movements by forming issue based committees to draw public support from beyond party lines and pressurise the government into providing relief measures while also badgering on about food scarcity on the floor of the legislative assembly to draw and retain public and media attention on the issue, Basu played a significant role in the latter with frequent moves for adjournment motions and participation in heated debates.

By the end of 1958, the Communist Party initiated the formation of the Price Increase and Famine Resistance Committee (PIFRC) in collaboration with the other primarily leftist members of the opposition. Basu became one of the formative leaders of the committee. Food insecurity in West Bengal had reached a critical stage at the time and its persistence was largely blamed on the Food Ministry and the Indian National Congress wherein the Communist Party had continuously asserted that the Congress party had been reduced to the representative party of hoarders, landlords and jotedars and that there would be no solution without direct action and sustained public pressure. Initially the committee principally engaged itself in laying down demands for price control, redistribution of state lands and organising agitations with that in retrospect.

On 10 February 1959, Basu and other leaders of the PIFRC met with the Chief Minister, Bidhan Chandra Roy who gave them verbal assurances that ration shops will be restocked offering amenable prices but the assurances weren't followed through. On 26 April, Union Food Minister, Ajit Prasad Jain declared that the food situation in West Bengal was "easy, smooth and comfortable". This caused widespread public outrage and led to the intensification of the Food movement of 1959 between May–June as the situation was further aggravated by hoarders attempting to save up stocks in illegal go-downs and warehouses. The persistent refusal of the Government of West Bengal to consider the demands presented also provoked the PIFRC into augmenting the demands to include enactment of ceilings on private land holdings and confiscation without compensation of excessive lands owned by Zamindars (trans: Landlords); these were presented in parallel with general strikes and organised direct action endorsed and supported by the committee to locate and force the sale of hidden stocks of rice.

On 25 June, the PIFRC and over 100 trade unions called a statewide hartal (general strike) to protest against the "anti–food" policies of the government. The agitators held an open mass meeting near the Chief Minister's residence where Basu was present among the speakers alongside Siddhartha Shankar Ray, Tridib Chaudhuri and Bankim Mukherjee, who demanded that the government should meet the conditions presented by the PIFRC or resign, otherwise they would organise a mass civil disobedience movement. On 9 July, the Swadhinata gave a clarion call through an editorial which stated that "People of West Bengal know quite well that the Congress Government and its food policy are responsible for their destitute condition. They also know that only by hitting hard, time and again, they could be forced to do at least something..." Earlier on 6 July, the PIFRC had issued a press release stating intent to begin the civil disobedience movement by taking preparations to organise volunteers; Basu was among the list of signatories that included Niranjan Sengupta and Nihar Mukherjee. The committee further set the date of 20 August for the beginning of the civil disobedience movement.

In August, the police arrested 35 prominent leaders of the committee including 7 members of legislative assembly through the usage of the Preventive Detention Act and the West Bengal Security Act. The movement however continued with civil disobedience, continuous general strikes and mass demonstrations while Basu was also able to evade arrest. On 31 August 1959, a massive demonstration cum general strike was held in the city of Calcutta which brought the city and its surrounding districts to a standstill and ended with lathi charges and instances of police violence on protesters. This caused an outburst of students protests against police atrocities and led to instances of police firing on student protesters. Over the course of the following days between 2–5 September, civil unrest with large scale participation from students of schools, colleges and universities erupted across the city accompanied by violent encounters with the police, vandalism and mass shootings by the police; in the end around 46–80 civilians were killed. The opposition leaders including Basu accused the government of having turned "authoritarian and ruthless" and reasoned that there was no space for the continuation of a democratic mass movement. In light of the violence, the PIFRC formally withdrew the agitation by 26 September and the committee was disbanded.

In the aftermath and over the course of the following years, Basu condemned the "police barbarism" against the agitators, engaging in fiery criticisms against the government and even brought a motion of no confidence, although it was defeated due to a lack of requisite members. The series of events had also heightened public resentment against the Congress government across West Bengal, especially in Calcutta and would set the foundation for latter political activism in the following decade. The food movement would also go on in the form of a number of localised spontaneous agitations over the following years till the next large scale flare up in 1966.

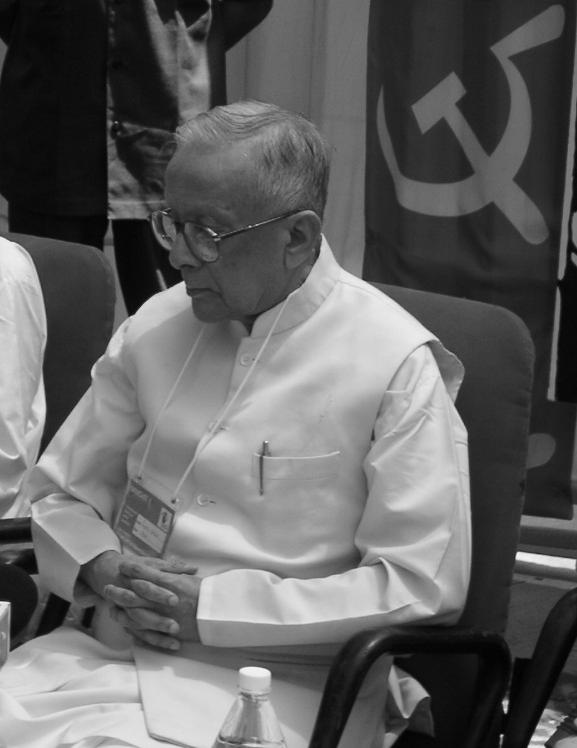
Jyoti Basu

== Communist Party of India (Marxist) (1964 afterwards) ==
=== Split from the Communist Party of India (1962–1966) ===
In the West Bengal Legislative Assembly election of 1962, Basu was once again re-elected as the representative of the Baranagar constituency and the Communist Party increased its vote share from 17.81% to 24.96%. In the following period the Communist Party underwent a vertical split with a section of the party including Basu going on to form the Communist Party of India (Marxist). There were several ongoing ideological conflicts between sections within the Communist Party about the nature of the Indian State and the characterisation and method of interaction with the Indian National Congress, about the approach towards the ongoing debate between the Soviet Union and China and with regards to the handling of the border disputes between India and China. These debates were further exacerbated by the food movement in West Bengal and brought to the forefront by the rising border tensions between India and China. The Communist Party had also become the second largest party in the Lok Sabha following the 1962 Indian general election with nearly 10% vote share which is described to have brought prominence to the internal divisions of the party.

The party was broadly divided into two sections namely the National Front (referred to as the "rightist section") and the Democratic Front (referred to as the "leftist section"). Basu belonging to the latter advocated for radical change to supplant the domination of big landlords, capitalists and monopolists in the Indian polity and opposed any conditional support for Nehruvian policies while denouncing the "revisionist position" taken by the former to support Jawaharlal Nehru on certain issues. The militant food movement in West Bengal also emboldened the leftist anti-Congress section to overwhelm the rightist section which sought tactical cooperation with the Indian National Congress. On the other hand, with the flare-up of the Sino-Indian War, the leftist section of the Communist Party was portrayed as "pro–china" by their opponents from both within and outside the party. Before the outbreak of the war, the section had taken the stance that dialogue and diplomatic partnership with the Chinese would resolve the disputes, however Basu himself was more sceptical and advocated for the adoption of a twin strategy of maintaining the border outposts inside Tibet and then engaging in talks using the outposts as a form of leverage ahead of any commencement on a new treaty.

The leftist section continued to oppose the Chinese stand on the India-China frontier but was also opposed to providing unconditional support to the Nehru government because of its "class character" contrary to the rightist section which had declared outright support for the central government. This stance of the leftist section came as dissatisfactory to the Nehru government which had imposed a state of national emergency and introduced the Defence of India Ordinance, 1962, and henceforth utilised them to imprison various opposition leaders and activists as well as Chinese Indian citizens. Basu was imprisoned among other major communist leaders such as the former chief minister of Kerala, E. M. S. Namboodiripad, the organisational specialist Promode Dasgupta, the founding leader of Communist Party of India (Marxist), Hare Krishna Konar, the Indian revolutionary freedom fighter, Benoy Choudhury, the Telangana revolutionaries, Puchalapalli Sundarayya and Makineni Basavapunnaiah as well as some members of the rightist section such as the trade unionist A. B. Bardhan. Basu reportedly received the news of his father's death during this time in prison. Although, the war ended in November 1962, the detainees were only released in December 1963 after an order from the Supreme Court of India.

On 11 April 1964, in a landmark incident, 32 members from the "Leftist faction" in the CPI national council including Basu walked out of a meeting in Delhi with the stated intent of forming the "real communist party". The section organised their conference in Tenali, Andhra Pradesh which concluded with a resolution to form a new party and in the seventh congress held between 31 October to 7 November in Calcutta, the Communist Party of India (Marxist) was formally founded. Basu was elected to the first politburo of the new party being one of the nine founding members commonly referred to as the Navaratnas (trans: nine gems). On 27 June 1965, Basu also became the founding editor of the English language organ of the new party called People's Democracy.

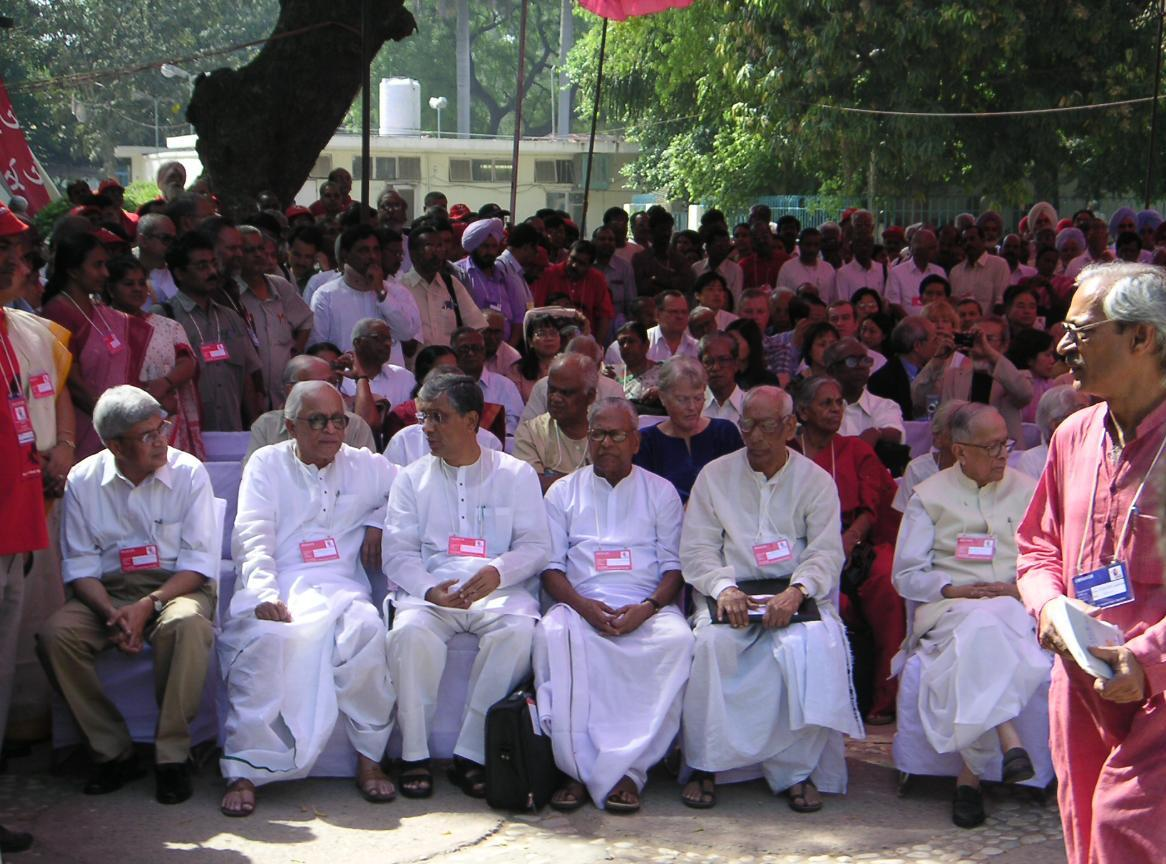
Jyoti Basu (extreme right front row) in the inaugural session of the 18th Congress of the CPI(M) in Delhi. Seated in the front row from the extreme left are Prakash Karat, Buddhadeb Bhattacharya, Manik Sarkar, V. S. Achuthanandan and K. Satyanarayana.

=== Coalition Governments in West Bengal (1966–1972) ===
Between February–March 1966, a second and more spontaneous food movement flared up across West Bengal. As a result of price rise of essential commodities, the new chief minister, Prafulla Chandra Sen had suggested that people should shift from their staple of rice–potatoes to wheat–green bananas and subsequently agitations had broken out in the area of Swarupnagar, leading to police firing and death of two participating teenagers on 16 February. Consequently, widespread spontaneous protests broke out over the following months and across the state of West Bengal with more frequent instances of vandalism and violent encounters between the agitators and police than in the previous agitations. This movement while having less organised backing from the opposition parties is described to have been impactful in its political ramifications in the subsequent years; among others, leading to the Indian National Congress losing its absolute majority for the first time and Basu becoming the deputy chief minister of West Bengal in the following year. Civil unrest also peaked during the ensuing period which led to a succession of unstable governments, the establishment of armed political cadres, Naxalbari uprising and widespread spontaneous agitations against prevailing conditions of extreme poverty.

In the West Bengal Legislative Assembly election of 1967, fourteen opposition parties contested through two pre-poll political alliances; the CPI-M led United Left Front and the CPI and Bangla Congress (splinter of the Congress party formed in 1966) led People's United Left Front. The CPI-M became the second largest party outstripping its former party, the CPI. Following the election, the two alliances joined forces to form the United Front government in West Bengal. During the negotiations between the two alliances, Basu was denied the position of chief minister due to opposition to the idea from the CPI and Bangla Congress, all of whom eventually settled for Ajoy Mukherjee of the Bangla Congress as the consensus candidate for the position while Basu became the deputy chief minister and in-charge of the finance department. The government however collapsed within a year when the food minister, P. C. Ghosh resigned from the government after facing persistent agitations led by the CPI-M (both part of the same government) against his policy of seeking voluntary measures from landlords and middlemen which were ineffective in resolving the food crisis.

For the mid-term West Bengal Legislative Assembly election of 1969, the United Front Committee was formed consisting of all the coalition partners of the previous government which agreed upon a pre-poll alliance to contest the election together under a 32-point programme. Under terms of the agreement, if the alliance were to attain a majority then Mukherjee would become the chief minister while Basu would become the deputy chief minister. In addition during the negotiations Basu was able to secure the portfolios of fisheries, food, excise, labour, civil defence and education for the CPI-M as well as the department of general administration and police from the home ministry forsaking the finance ministry which he had previously held. In the election, the United Front won an overwhelming victory with 214 out of 280 seats and as a consequence, the CPI-M stood as the first party other than the Congress party to become the largest party in the assembly.

In the subsequent second United Front cabinet, Basu became both the deputy chief minister and in-charge of general administration and police. Under Basu, the police were instructed to not intervene in any labour disputes against striking workers. The first six months of the second United Front government as a result experienced a record of 551 strikes and 73 union lockdowns across the state with a participation of approximately 570,000 workers. The labour department headed by Krishnapada Ghosh of the CPIM is also noted to have coordinated with the department of general administration to enable the registration of new trade unions and legalisation of gheraos (trans: picketing) as a method of protest. The labour militancy combined with the state policy of non intervention drove an exponential rise in daily wages ranging between a 100–200% increase in the unorganised sector and 100–300% increase in the organised sector. Previously in light of the appalling conditions of agrarian poverty and rural discontent, a radical section of the CPI-M had also split due to the party's involvement in parliamentary politics and subsequently launched a peasant's uprising. Eventually this section known as the Naxalites formed the Communist Party of India (Marxist-Leninist) in 1969 under the leadership of Charu Mazumdar calling for the annihilation of the class of joteodars (wealthy landlords) and an armed revolution to overthrow the Indian state. Although the previous United Front government had tolerated initial landgrabs by the Naxalites, the police department under Basu launched a campaign of state repression on the movement which continued under succeeding governments. According to Basu, "(The Naxalites), forgetting everything else that the country stood for, followed the China model with disastrous consequences which had no relation to Marxist philosophy."

In August 1969, Basu was also faced with a protest from the police department itself after the death of a policeman in a clash with the Socialist Unity Centre, one of the member parties of the United Front. The agitation was notably defused by him in person, who permitted a group of dissident police personnel to enter his office in the assembly house during a demonstration and negotiated with them, reprehending them for disorderly behaviour while taking into consideration the grievances raised. The second United Front government however too fell within a short period of time, on this occasion the chief minister Ajoy Mukherjee resigned in March 1970 after facing an aggravated and dysfunctional government where smaller member parties were in confrontation with the CPI-M, the largest among them on various issues. There was also an assassination attempt on Basu on 31 March while he was on a party visit to Patna which resulted in the death of one accompanying party worker; the identity of the assailant has remained unknown til date. The government continued to be operational until the dissolution of the assembly by presidential proclamation on 30 July.

In the following West Bengal Legislative Assembly election of 1971, the parties contested alone but CPI-M remained as the single largest party while increasing its number of seats from 80 to 113. Both the former chief minister Ajoy Mukherjee of the Bangla Congress and the former deputy chief minister Basu of the Communist Party of India (Marxist) contested from the Barangar constituency which ended with Basu winning with a vote share of 57.3% and Ajoy Mukherjee emerging as runners up with a vote share of 42.7%. However, Mukherjee who led the Bangla Congress was able to regain his former position through a post-poll coalition called the Democratic Coalition which notably included Indira Gandhi's Congress and was supported by the CPI and Congress (Organisation). The CPI-M stood as the sole opposition party and Basu once again became the leader of opposition. Within 2 weeks of the formation of the new government, Basu issued a no confidence motion which stood at exactly 141 in support of the government out of 141 required. Despite surviving the initial motion, the new government too fell within 3 months when the assembly was dissolved on the recommendation of the chief minister.

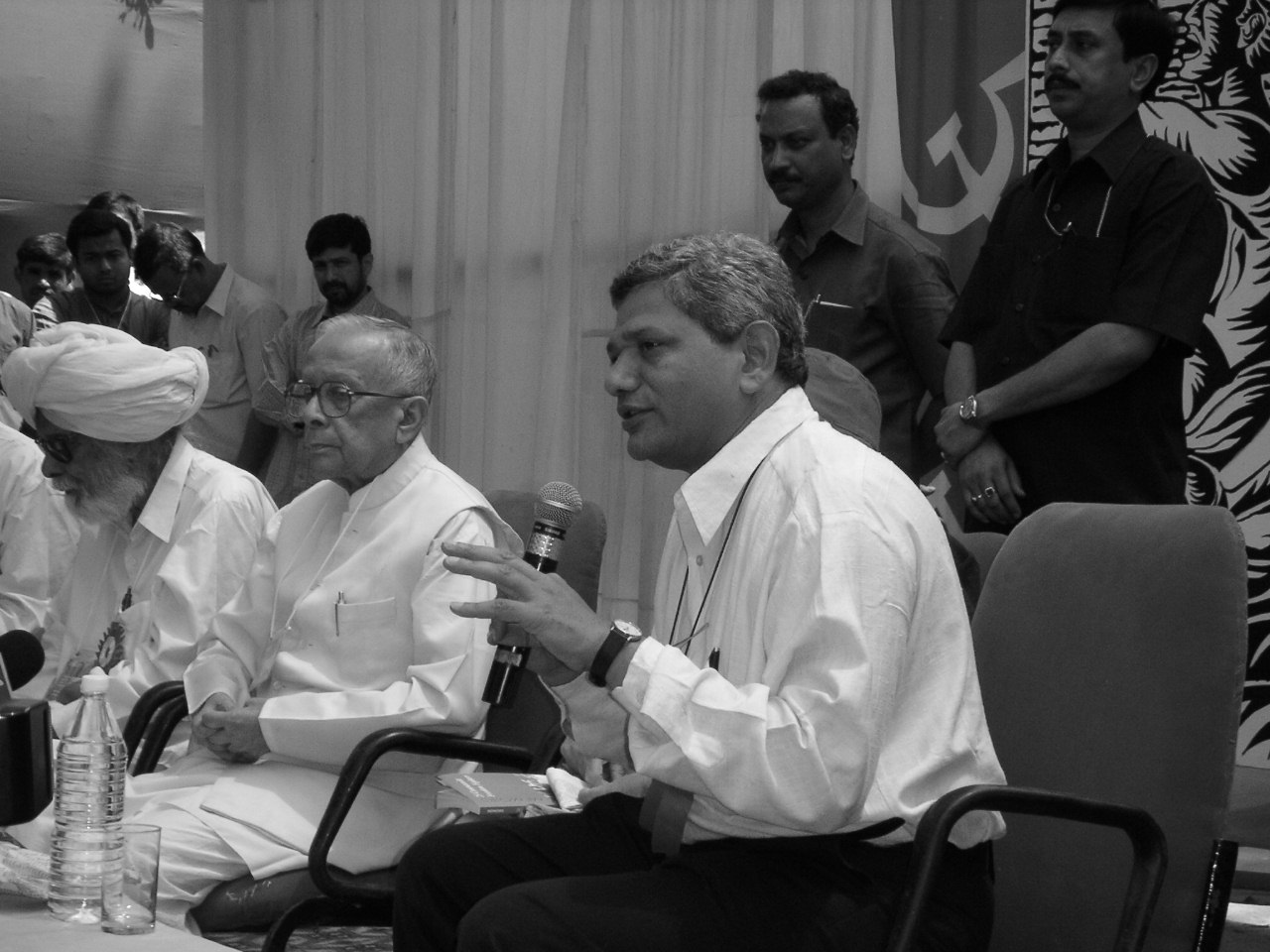
Press conference at the book release of Memoirs – 25 Communist Freedom Fighters by Sitaram Yechuri at the 18th Congress of Communist Party of India (Marxist), Delhi, 2005. From the left, Harkishan Singh Surjeet (general secretary), Jyoti Basu (former Chief Minister of West Bengal), and Sitaram Yechuri (politburo member).

=== Boycott of Assembly and Emergency rule (1972–1977) ===
In the West Bengal Legislative Assembly election of 1972, Congress (R) won an overwhelming majority and Siddhartha Shankar Ray who was previously in the Bangla Congress and later appointed as a specialised union cabinet ministry called West Bengal Affairs Minister became the new chief minister of the state. The CPI-M was only able to secure 14 seats and Basu for the first time lost his seat in the Baranagar constituency to his former associate Shiba Pada Bhattacharjee, who had remained in the CPI after the split in the party. Before the election, the Communist Party of India allied with Congress (R) while a section of the Bangla Congress had also merged with the Congress. The opposing alliance was led by the Communist Party of India (Marxist) which included the previous members of the United Left Front alongside the Biplobi Bangla Congress, a splinter of the Bangla Congress.

The election was marred widespread instances of violence against opposition parties, electoral discrepancies, irregularities in process and consequent allegations of rigging from both Congress (O) and the CPI-M, the press in Calcutta at the time reported that the rigging had occurred in around 50 constituencies. According to the socialist essayist Madhu Limaye, the "black art of booth rigging" was perfected by the Congress in the 1972 election where whole constituencies had been rigged. It was also noted that several constituencies which were known as left wing strongholds had produced massive victory margins in favour of Congress (R) whereas the CPI-M increased its vote share in constituencies which were Congress strongholds; the explanation provided by the CPI-M was that violence and rigging methods were mostly employed at unfavorable constituencies and that elections had been rigged in 87–172 other constituencies. One of the discrepancies pointed at by the CPI-M was that the constituency of Baranagar which had recorded a very high voter turnout despite being subject to section 144 and violent clashes throughout the day which had resulted in the death of one its workers. Basu refused to accept the results and declared that the new assembly was an "assembly of frauds". He also published an open editorial to the "world press" regarding terming the incidents of violence to be "semi-fascist terror". The CPI-M boycotted the assembly for the remaining term of the seventh assembly taking the stance that a "massive rigging" had occurred.

In 1975, the Prime Minister of India, Indira Gandhi imposed a national emergency on the premise of internal disturbances suspending elections, legitimising rule by decree and curbing civil liberties. The proposition for the declaration of the emergency and the formal draft of the ordinance were both notably corroborated to have been forwarded by Siddhartha Shankar Ray. The Communist Party of India (Marxist) emerged as one of the primary opposition to the emergency rule of Indira Gandhi. The following period witnessed a succession of authoritarian measures and political repression, which was particularly severe in West Bengal. The members of the CPI-M's labour union became the first subject to political repression and mass arrests while the rest of the members of the CPI-M went underground.

With the initiation of the Jayaprakash Narayan (JP)'s movement, the CPI-M began providing support to it and went on to participate in discussions for the creation of a united front under the umbrella of the Janata Party. Several of the leaders of the CPI-M were also influenced by JP with Basu noted to be one of his prominent admirers having worked under him in the All India Railwaymen's Federation during the 1940s. The involvement of the Hindutva movement however complicated matters, according to JP the formal inclusion of the Marxists who had undergone a splintering and whose organisation was localised in a particular region would have been detrimental to the movement as the Rashtriya Swayamsevak Sangh members would switch sides if they joined. JP and Basu eventually agreed that the CPI-M would not formally join the Janata Party as it would weaken the movement. After the revocation of the emergency, the CPI-M joined an electoral alliance with the Janata Party in the 1977 Indian general election which resulted in an overwhelming victory for the Janata Alliance.

== Chief Minister of West Bengal (1977–2000) ==
For the 1977 West Bengal Legislative Assembly election, negotiations between the Janata Party and the Communist Party of India (Marxist) broke down. This led to a three sided contest between the Indian National Congress, the Janata Party and the Communist Party of India (Marxist) led Left Front coalition. The results of the election was a surprising sweep for the Left Front winning 230 seats out of 290 with the CPI-M winning an absolute majority on its own, Basu became the chief minister of West Bengal for the next 23 years until his retirement in 2000. Jyoti Basu was also repeatedly elected as the representative of the Satgachhia constituency from 1977 to 2001.

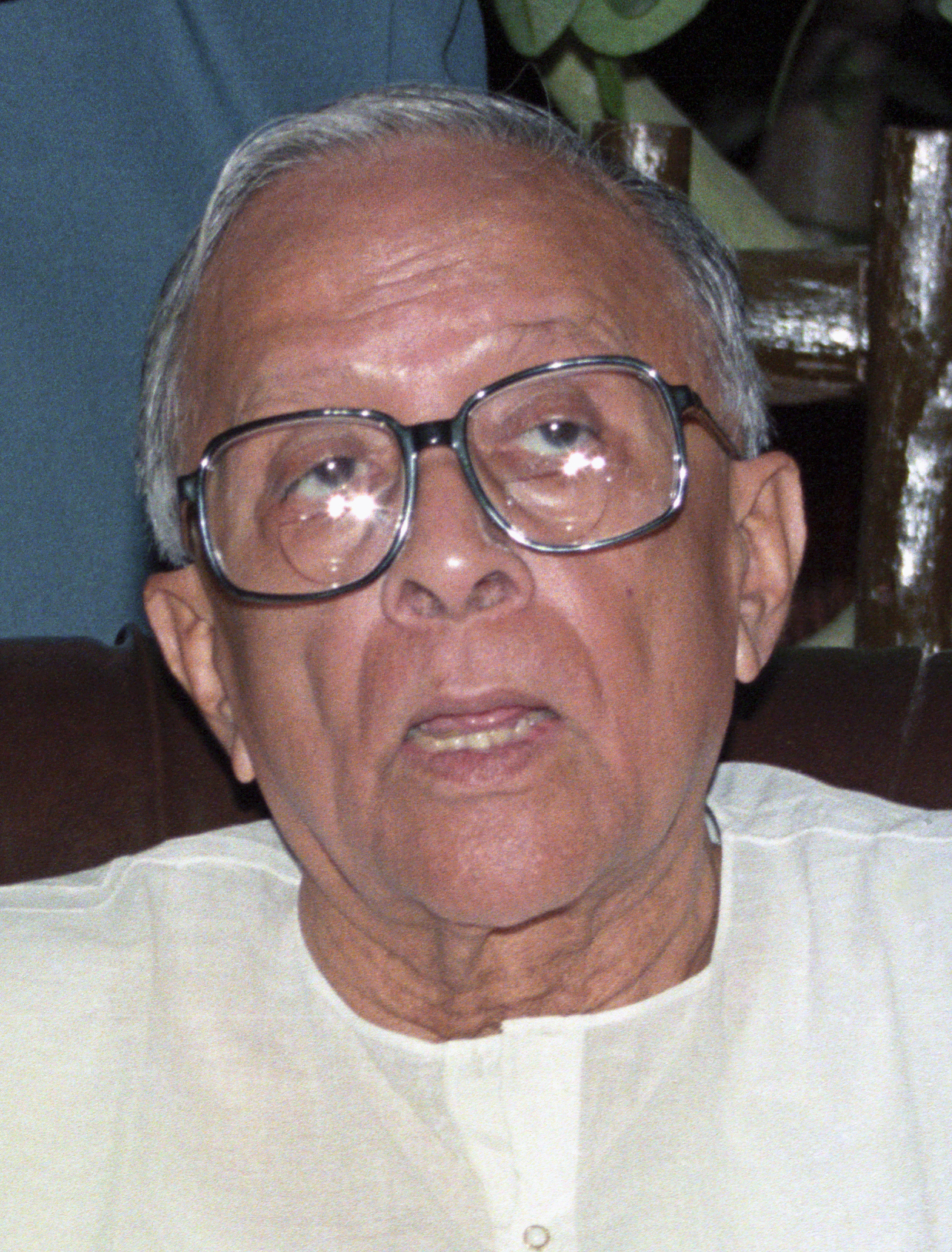
Jyoti Basu in his office

=== First term (1977–1982) ===
In the first term of the coming to power, the Left Front government under Basu initiated a number of agrarian and institutional reforms which resulted in reduction of poverty rates, an exponential rise in agricultural production and decrease in political polarisation. It also enabled the large scale adoption of technological advancements which had earlier been brought in through the Green Revolution in India in the 1960s. The agricultural growth jumped from an annual average of 0.6% between 1970–1980 to over 7% between 1980–1990 and the state was described as an agricultural success story of the 1980s. During this period, the state of West Bengal moved from being a food importer to a food exporter and became the largest producer of rice outstripping the states of Andhra Pradesh and Punjab which had previously held the status. The Human Development Index was also noted to have improved at a much faster rate than in other states, growing from being the lowest in the country in 1975 to above the national average in 1990.

Between 1977 and 1980, Basu oversaw the identification of nearly 1 million acres of ceiling surplus land and its subsequent redistribution. The number of landless rural households decreased by 35% during this period.

The Basu government began the process of "democratic decentralisation" in West Bengal by amending and implementing the provisions of the Panchayat Act. On 4 June 1978, local body elections were resumed after 14 years and the first direct elections were held to elect 56,000 representatives from 15 zila parishads, 324 panchayat samitis and 3,242 gram panchayats in West Bengal. By 1993, the number of representatives was expanded to over 71,000 representatives while Basu was credited to have been successful in the introduction of grassroots democracy and self governing units in West Bengal which substantially improved bureaucratic transparency, irrigation work, rural infrastructure and political participation and as a result standards of living. The successful implementation of panchayat raj in the state is also noted to have played an integral part in the identification and redistribution of ceiling surplus land, and played a significant part in the rise of agricultural growth through the 1980s.

Among the more prominent measures initiated by the new government was that of Operation Barga. Introduced in 1978, it was a comprehensive and radical measure for land reforms which was further formalised through two legislation in 1979 and 1980. The operation sought to actively identify and record bargardars (trans: sharecroppers) by present occupational status without any reliance on ancestral records, producing official documentation for enforcement of the rights of bargardars to crop share from landlords and priority rights to lands in cases of both voluntary sale of land and forced sale of ceiling surplus lands. The number of recorded bargardars increased from 0.4 to 1.2 million by 1982, and resulted in the coverage of 50%+ output share concessions towards bargardars to increase from 10% to over 50% among registered bargardars and over 33% for unregistered bargardars. The implementation of the operation is noted to have improved the social status and security of tenancy of bargadars as well as decreased economic inequality. In addition it accounted for approximately 36% of agricultural growth during the period as a consequence of greater production incentives due to a lack of eviction threat and increased output stake. The operation is also credited to have created a cushion against farmers' suicides in West Bengal by improving the economic stability of farmers.

The Left Front government also identified 247,000 acres of readily reclaimable lands mostly in the Sundarban area (Ganges Delta) for the resettlement of 136,000 agriculturist refugees from East Pakistan. Under the tenure of Bidhan Chandra Roy, many of the refugees had been relocated to refugee camps in Dandakaranya and the Left Front government had taken up their cause for resettlement in West Bengal. Initially Basu and the Left Front government approved voluntary resettlement in the identified lands by the refugees from the Dandakaranya camps to the extent of actively encouraging them to do so, however the implementation of the resettlement process turned lackluster and was bottle-necked with revised priorities for environmental protection in the Sundarbans. In a significant development between 1978 and 1979, a large group of these impoverished refugees who had returned to Bengal seeking resettlement from Dandakaranya had illegally occupied land on the remote island of Marichjhanpi and refused eviction. In January 1979, following an economic blockade, the government conducted a forcible eviction leading to the death of several refugees in the consequent abuse by police personnel. The incident led to sharp criticism of the government and raised controversy in the media, the opposition as well as from within members of the Left Front coalition. The demand for a formal investigation into the eviction was however denied by the government with Basu convinced that it was greatly exaggerated by the media; in the end the official figure put the deaths at 2 but the lack of an investigation led to various other estimates to circulate on the killing years afterwards.

In 1981, a new amendment was introduced to the West Bengal Land Reforms Act, 1951 (previously amended in 1953, 1967 and 1970) which sought to plug loopholes in the former legislation; the amendment introduced ceilings on non-agricultural lands such as fisheries and orchards which previously had none and enacted provisions for lands held by trusts to be included in the individual ceiling calculations of its beneficiaries. It also derecognised and redefined lands owned by all religious institutions as raiyats (trans: land tenure) with a maximum of 7 standard hectares irrespective of any number of declared branches or centers of any such institution.

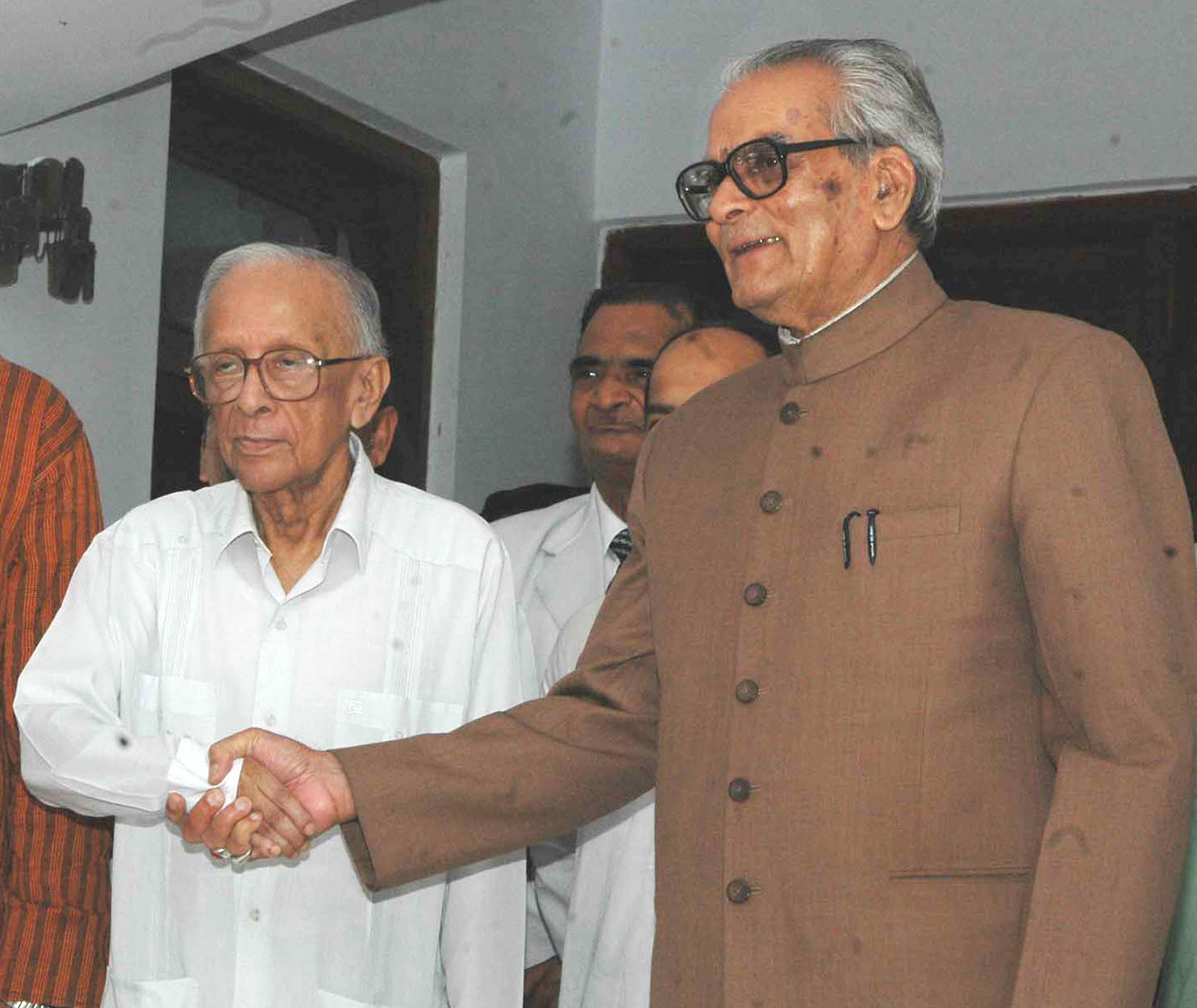
Jyoti Basu with former Vice President of India, Bhairon Singh Shekhawat

=== Second term (1982–1987) ===
The reforms initiated by the Basu government in its first term were continued into its second term, Operation Barga was officially completed in 1986. Basu's front won 174 seats in 1982 West Bengal Elections defeating the Congress (Indira) - Congress (Socialist) coalition He was one of the most powerful personality of the Left front after becoming the Chief Minister of West Bengal and was known to be the Chief artist of the Communist politics not only in West Bengal, but also in the whole India. Ahead of the 1982 assembly elections, the Left Front had gained three new members; the Communist Party of India (CPI), the West Bengal Socialist Party (WBSP) and the Democratic Socialist Party (DSP). In the wake of the 1980 Gorkhaland movement, a poll boycott campaign took place in the Darjeeling hills with the slogan "No State, No Vote". Organizations calling for a poll boycott included the Pranta Parishad and the Gorkha National Liberation Front of Subhash Ghisingh. Voter participation in Darjeeling stood at 59.40%, compared to the statewide 76.96%. CPI(M) emerged as the sole party of relevance in the hills to oppose a separate Gorkhaland state. CPI(M) won three out of the four assembly seats in the Nepali-dominated areas, the fourth going to an All India Gorkha League candidate (contesting as an independent). Some of the older, smaller Left Front constituents were uncomfortable with the expansion of the alliance, claiming that CPI(M) was diluting it politically. There were also disagreements on distribution of ministerial portfolios after the expansion of the alliance. Though due to his irresponsibility in rehabilitiating 1971 Bangladeshi refugees and refusal to address the rise of anti-Bengali sentiments in Assam and other Northeaster states like Meghalaya (see Beh Dkhar movement) and Tripura (see Mandai massacre) saw his popularity decrease.

In the second term as the Chief Minister of state he gained popularity for his work for the landless peasants and providing them land and also among intelligentsia. The rise of Mamata Banerjee in the 1980s was under the Second Chief Ministership of him and was known to have a good allies with her. And he continued to make a second Chief ministership like the first one by giving the theory of Communism and working in the Land Reforms Act and also to complete the demand of the Gorkhas, especially in Darjeeling and near by regions. Whilst an accord had been struck between Prime Minister Rajiv Gandhi and Gorkha National Liberation Front leader Subhash Ghisingh ahead of the polls, violence escalated in the Darjeeling hills. In the run-up to the polls, several policemen were killed in the area which made Basu a great chances being a choice of people of Darjeeling. (Note: Jyoti Basu took the vote bank of the people of Darjeeling due to their anger on Rajiv Gandhi, who was West Bengal incharge.)

In 1986, Finance Minister Ashok Mitra resigned from the Cabinet, citing differences with Basu, which was a big blow to his government.

=== Third term (1987–1991) ===
In 1987 West Bengal Election in West Bengal, Basu held the office for the third time as the Chief ministers of West Bengal after the win of CPM and their allies. The election was mainly a clash between the Left Front led by Chief Minister Jyoti Basu and the Indian National Congress(I) led by Prime Minister Rajiv Gandhi to make a win in the state. The governing Left Front denied tickets to 62 sitting legislators. In many cases CPI(M), the dominant force in the Left Front, was seeking to rejuvenate the legislature and fielded 35 student leaders as new candidates. The star campaigner was himself Chief Minister Jyoti Basu who had pledged to visit all constituencies where CPI(M) had fielded candidates. During the campaign Basu claimed that the Delhi government discriminated against West Bengal in allocation of resources. Basu's party made the third win by securing a complete majority for third time in Bengal's history, and the Left front secured 187 in the election and defeating Indian National Congress and made his mark to Prime Minister, Rajiv Gandhi.

After being sworn in as the Chief Minister Basu continued his work in the major work for which he was elected was that to change the Land Reform and he is said to be one of the best administrators in the history of West Bengal for the work. And he made a main focus on the Students and Buddhadeb Bhattacharjee was given the main charge for the enhancement of DYFI, the student wing of the CPI(M). Earlier also he gave a notable number of tickets to student leaders and also worked for the Gurkhas who also voted him for his opposition to the Indian National Congress. In 1989, Basu led Left government in a controversial decision, halting the teaching of English language for Primary schools. The controversial decision received protests from intellectuals. The move was later termed as another "historic blunder".

In the 1990s when the government of VP Singh cleared the ways of Mandal Commission there was Mandal Commission protests of 1990 in West Bengal and also the silence of Basu triggered him at that time as there was a big problem as the CPI (M) was popular among both the classes of the society and CPI (M) supported the verdict.

=== Fourth term (1991–1996) ===
Even after the controversy of Mandal Commission and its protests in 1990 Basu managed to be sworn as the Chief Minister of West Bengal for the 4th time consecutively, setting a record. The term of the assembly elected in 1987 lasted until February 1992, but the West Bengal government asked the Election Commission of India to arrange the election at an earlier date. On 28 November 1991, Basu superseded Bidhan Chandra Roy's 14 - year tenure to become the longest serving Chief Minister of West Bengal, a record which he has held ever since at 23 years, 144 days.

Jyoti Basu's fourth term was hit with two major resignations - that of Information and Culture Minister Buddhadeb Bhattacharya in 1993 over the issue of corruption and that of Land Minister Benoy Choudhury in 1995 over the same issue.

=== Fifth term (1996–2000) ===
In 1996 he was elected as Chief Minister for an unprecedented fifth times consecutively in the 1996 West Bengal Legislative Assembly election. Basu seemed all set to be the consensus leader of the United Front for the post of Prime Minister of India but the CPI(M)'s highest decision-making body refused to endorse Basu's prime-ministerial ambitions. This was Basu's last tenure as the Chief Minister of West Bengal. Basu resigned in the year 2000 leaving a legacy as the longest serving Chief Minister of any Indian state, until Pawan Kumar Chamling surpassed his record in 2018.

Shortly after coming to power, it came to light that in its previous term, the state government had illegally leased out around 160 waqf properties in the state to private real-estate developers and land contractors without following the due process. Basu denied all allegations and questioned the veracity of the report. The next year, the Basu government was hit with the 'Treasury Scam' in which it was revealed in response to a PIL filed in the Calcutta High Court by Mamata Banerjee that throughout Basu's 4th term, the state government run treasuries in the districts had siphoned off a total of Rs 55,000 crore of public money to personal ledger accounts (meant for payment of excise duty) held by CPI(M) partymen and another amount of Rs 2,500 crore sent by the Central government for rural development had been diverted into these accounts in the run-up to the 1998 elections of the state panchayats. However, the government steadfastedly refused any investigation into this, and denied any wrongdoing on its part. However a CAG report revealed that during Basu's 4th term, central funds of the amount Rs 1,800 cr to 2,500 crore annually allotted to the state by the central government had been regularly diverted to personal ledger accounts held by CPI(M) officeholders in rural government. On the very same year, it was revealed that Basu had used the Chief Minister's discretionary powers to illegally allot real estate in multiple locations of Salt Lake locality of East Kolkata at extremely cheap prices to various people, including his own brother-in-law and three cabinet ministers (Fisheries Minister Kiranmoy Nanda, Co-operatives Minister Bhakti Bhushan Mandal and Minority Affairs Minister Mohammed Amin).

Basu was personally shocked at the victory of state Bharatiya Janata Party (whom he would derisively call 'a party of barbaric and uncivilized people') president Tapan Sikdar from Dumdum constituency in the 1998 general elections, defeating 3 time CPI(M) MP Nirmal Kanti Chatterjee. The rise of BJP in the state forced Basu's government to address the issue of illegal infiltration of Bangladeshi Muslims into the state.

Basu once proposed to make Bengali compulsory for any government job exams under state government, but this faced criticisms from Atal Bihari Vajpayee lead National Democratic Alliance at the centre, who called it unconstitutional and a harm to the linguistic minority groups of West Bengal. Railway Minister of that time and West Bengal Trinamool Congress chief, Mamata Banerjee, initially did not support the proposal. Under his period, Bengali was introduced as a court language in the Calcutta High Court

== Proposal for Prime-ministership ==
Jyoti Basu was proposed for the post of prime minister four times.

In 1990, following the arrest of Lal Krishna Advani at his Ram Rathyatra rally at Samastipur on orders of then Chief Minister of Bihar & Janata Dal leader Lalu Prasad Yadav, BJP declined support to the National Front Government led by V. P. Singh. During the political crisis, INC chief Rajiv Gandhi sent proposal to Jyoti Basu to be the Prime Minister of India. But CPI(M) declined it, because the party refused to cooperate with the Congress, which it saw as a bourgeois organisation. (Note: In fact, it was the issue of co-operating with the Congress in post-independence India that led to the creation of the CPI(M), of which Basu was a founding member, following the 1964 CPI split.) Hence after the resignation of V.P. Singh, a new government led a breakaway faction of the Janata Dal under Chandrashekhar Singh was sworn in with external support from the Congress.

After 7 months, INC withdrew its support to the Chandrasekhar Singh Government. Again Rajiv Gandhi sent a proposal to Jyoti Basu, which was declined by the party for second time. Hence general elections were held in 1991.

In the Indian general election in 1996, the Bharatiya Janata Party (BJP) led by Atal Bihari Vajpayee emerged as the largest party, with 161 of 543 seats but the government fell 13 days later, due to unavailability of majority at the parliament. The Indian National Congress (INC), with a substantial 140 seats, declined to head the government. Consequently, along with Janata Dal as the head, the left parties (i.e. CPI(M), CPI) and other smaller parties like Samajwadi Party, Dravida Munnetra Kazhagam, Asom Gana Parishad, Tamil Maanila Congress, and Telugu Desam Party formed the United Front, which was supported by INC from outside. About the selection of Prime Minister from United Front, Vishwanath Pratap Singh from Janata Dal rejected the proposal of being Prime Minister. He suggested that Basu should be made the Prime Minister of the United Front government. RJD's chief Lalu Prasad Yadav also supported the proposal. The CPI also supported the proposal. The proposal was taken to CPI(M) by former CPI(M) General Secretary Harkishan Singh Surjeet. The Polit Bureau of CPI(M) met in a meeting. But having no conclusion due to differences, it forwarded the issue to the Central Committee after a voting. Through a meeting in Central Committee on May 14, CPI(M) declined the offer saying the party was still not in a position to dictate its policies and would not be able to get them implemented by a coalition government. They also stated that it would involve joining hands with "bourgeois" outfits like the Congress. Sitaram Yechury was among the leaders who were against Basu being the Prime Minister. When Surjeet conveyed this to United Front leaders, V. P. Singh again suggested that the CPI(M) should reconsider the decision. From Tamil Nadu House, Surjeet called Prakash Karat to tell leaders to stay back for an emergency meeting. But the Central Committee again turned down that offer. After Basu, the names of late G. K. Moopanar and DMK chief M. Karunanidhi came over but Basu suggested H. D. Deve Gowda for the top post citing his experience as a minister first and Chief Minister of Karnataka and Janata Dal accepted the offer and he was elected as the Prime Minister of India. H.D Deve Gowda personally wrote a letter to Jyoti Basu to be the prime minister which Basu declined again due to party choices.

In 1999, the BJP Government by Atal Bihari Vajpayee fell down. Leaders of third front including J. Jayalalithaa and Mulayam Singh Yadav and others again suggested Jyoti Basu. This time CPI(M) eventually agreed to the proposal. But INC declined.

Later when asked about the decision of the CPI(M), Jyoti Basu stated that as a "historic blunder". In the words of Basu, "yes, I still think that it was a historic blunder because such an opportunity does not come. History does not give such an opportunity." Noted Congress politician Arjun Singh was also upset due to the CPI(M)'s decision. The CPI said that Jyoti Basu as Prime Minister was 'worth-trying'.

== Later life ==
=== Post–resignation (2000–2010) ===
Jyoti Basu with Saroj Ghose and Ashesh Prosad Mitra in Calcutta

Even after stepping down from the government, Jyoti Basu personally campaigned for the CPI(M) candidate Amitava Nandy for the Dumdum seat against the incumbent BJP MP (now Union Minister of Telecom and Fertilisers) Tapan Sikdar during the 2004 general elections and was said to have been personally satisfied on hearing about Sikdar's defeat in the election.

The 18th congress of CPI(M), held in Delhi in 2005, re-elected Basu to its Politburo, although he had requested acceptance for his retirement. On 13 September 2006, his request for retirement due to age was turned down by the CPI(M), the general secretary Prakash Karat stated that the party wanted that Basu should continue till at least the 2008 congress. In the 19th congress held in early April 2008, Basu was eventually dis-included from the Politburo, although his membership in the Central Committee was not revoked. He was also granted the designation of Special Invitee to the Politburo, a form of emeritus status within the CPI(M).

== Death ==
On 1 January 2010, Basu was admitted to AMRI hospital (Bidhannagar, Kolkata) after he was diagnosed with pneumonia. On 16 January 2010, it was reported that he was suffering from multiple organ failure and that his health condition had become extremely critical. Seventeen days after being taken ill, he died on 17 January 2010 at 11:47 am IST. Biman Bose announced with tears, "Jyoti Babu has left us."

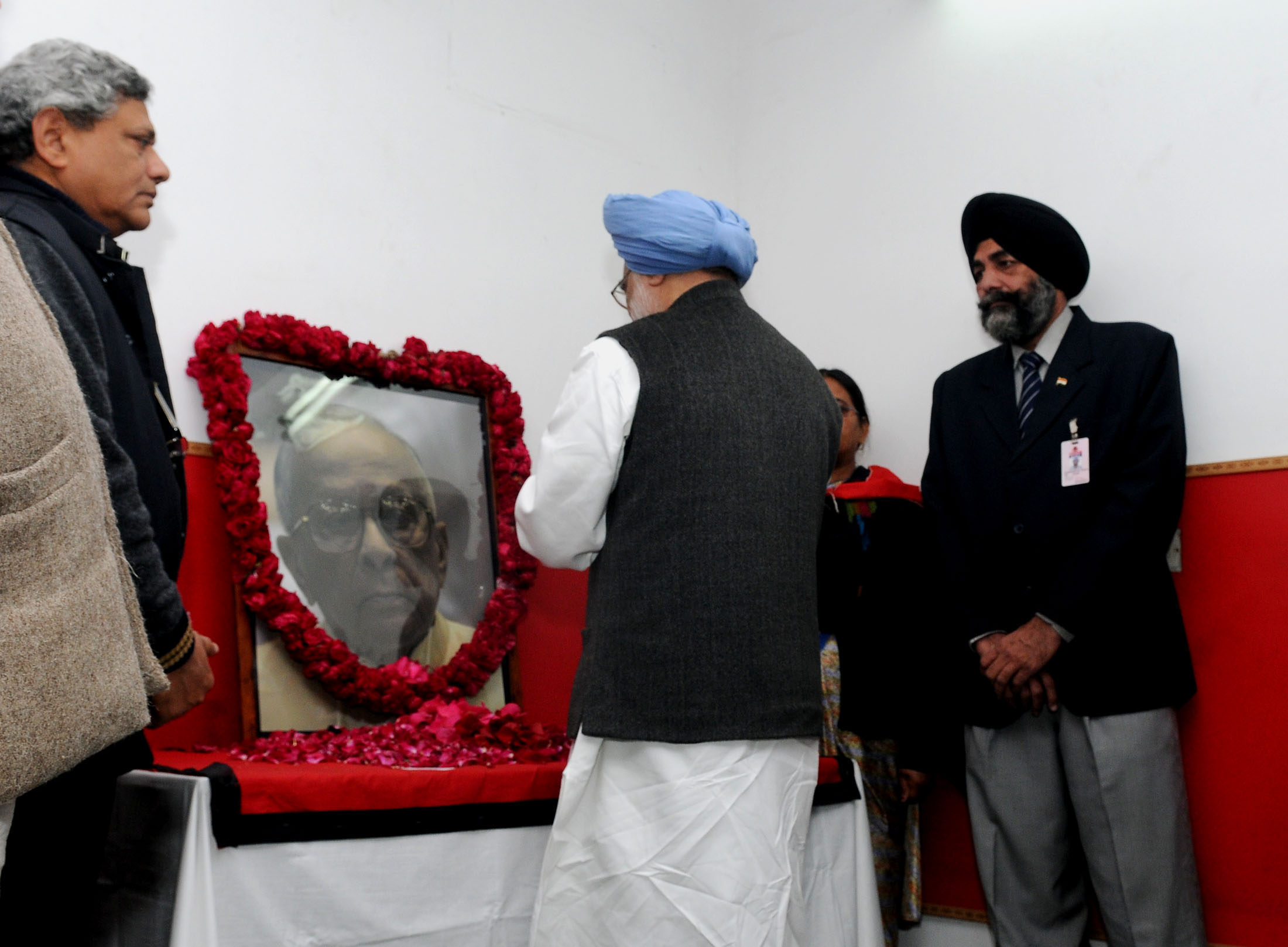
Condolences by Manmohan Singh (right) and Sitaram Yechury (left)

The death was followed by public mourning on an unprecedented scale. Draped in the national flag, Basu's body was escorted through the streets of Calcutta on a gun carriage. However, the time schedule went awry in his last moments as lakhs of people thronged the streets of central Kolkata to pay their last respects. Police and volunteers wore a helpless look as a sea of people poured in from every possible corner of the city. The Army escorted the cortege from the State Assembly to the Maidan through Red Road. At Moharkunja Park, arrangements for the state funeral had been made. The army buglers performed the last post as twenty one Gurkha troops fired a 21 volley rifle salute. A day of Mourning was declared nationwide and President Pratibha Patil along with Prime Minister Manmohan Singh expressed their condolences.

Being a communist, Basu had pledged to donate his body and eyes for medical research on 4 April 2003 at a function organised by Ganadarpan and Susrut Eye Foundation in Kolkata and not to be burned at a crematorium according to Hindu funerary customs. His eyes are donated to Susrut Eye Foundation. He is survived by his son Chandan, daughter-in-law Rakhi, grand daughters Payel (Mallika Basu), Doyel (Bithika Basu) and Koyel (Juthika Basu), offspring of his first daughter-in-law Dolly (separated with son Chandan in 1998), and grand son Subhojyoti, offspring of daughter-in-law Rakhi. Basu's body was kept at 'Peace Haven' for those who wanted to pay their respects. His body was handed over to SSKM Hospital, Kolkata for research on 19 January 2010 around 4:50 pm IST after a guard of honour at the nearby Moharkunja park (formerly, Citizens' park). The hospital authority ended up preserving his brain.

=== Reactions and tributes on his death ===
Basu's death was reacted with grief across the country and in international. Many famous personalities bade their gratitude and condolences in social media and attended his funeral. Some of their statements are listed below:

- India
  - Former Prime Minister of India Manmohan Singh reacted to his death, "He was a powerful regional voice in the national political scene and had proved to be one of the most ablest administrators and politicians of independent India."
  - Former Home Minister and Finance Minister of India, P. Chidambaram stated that "He was a colossus who straddled India's political scene for many decades. Not only the leader of West Bengal, but of India. He was a great patriot, great democrat, great parliamentarian and great source of inspiration. He served the people of India to the best."
  - Former INC president Sonia Gandhi reacted "Shri Jyoti Basu did not go gently into the good night - he fought bravely until his last breath, just as he did throughout his life. And what a rich, fulfilled and glorious life he had!"
  - Former President of India Pranab Mukherjee commented "He was a towering personality, longest serving chief minister in contemporary period. He was the architect of first UPA government. I developed close intimacy with him from 1960s; have lost a great well-wisher. Country has lost great parliamentarian and a patriot."
  - Former Chief Minister of West Bengal Buddhadeb Bhattacharya: "He was our guardian. The country has lost a great leader and the Left democratic movement in the country has received a severe blow. He will forever be remembered for his contribution to the country."
  - Former Chief Minister of Karnataka and External Affairs Minister of India, S. M. Krishna commented "The country has lost a steadfast champion of the causes of underprivileged."
  - Former Speaker of the Lok Sabha, Somnath Chatterjee expressed, "Personally I have lost my father for the second time in Jyoti Basu's death. He was a stalwart, a great leader. He held the CPM fort in West Bengal for a long time."
  - Former Deputy Prime Minister of India and founder of Bharatiya Janata Party, L. K. Advani commented "He was a stalwart... a great leader. He held the CPM fort in West Bengal for a long time. The Communist movement has been affected. Basu was in the line of great leaders like E M S Namboodiripad, Bhupesh Gupta and Indrajit Gupta. Our ideologies were different. Still, going by his greatness, I respect him and pay my tributes."
  - Former Chief Minister of Delhi, Sheila Dikshit said "Something seems to have snapped, an era. He was a very dignified leader. He ruled over West Bengal for two decades and can't remember a single time when he was controversial. He ruled for 20 years that speaks of the trust and faith that people had in him. He was one of the tallest chief ministers this country has ever seen."
  - Former Chief Minister of West Bengal Mamata Banerjee commented "He was a tall political figure in the country. He was instrumental behind formation of the Left Front government in West Bengal. He was the first and last chapter of the Left Front government and Left movement."
  - Former Chief Minister of Tamil Nadu, M. Karunanidhi stated him as one of the pioneers of the socialist movement.
  - Former Finance Minister of India, Arun Jaitley reacted: "One of the tallest contemporary leaders, devoted to his ideology, with perhaps one of the longest innings in Indian public life. Today is not the time to talk about differences. That's the strength of Indian democracy... it gives space to exist with differences."
  - Former External Affairs Minister of India, and Chief Minister of Delhi, Sushma Swaraj: 'He was a leader of stature and experience. He earned so much love and respect of people that his popularity didn't decline after he stepped down as CM. I didn't have such a direct relationship with him but I've always admired his work culture."
  - CPI General Secretary, D. Raja: "One of the finest leaders with a glorious revolutionary legacy. He was a good chief minister who proved that coalition of left parties worked successfully and would have been a great at national level also."
  - Former Prime Minister of India, I. K. Gujral: "Basu's death is a grave loss for the country."
  - Ratan Tata, chairman, Tata group expressed condolences: "We view his passing with great sorrow. He was a great leader of the Nation and of the State. He will be missed by all."
  - B. K. Birla, chairman, B. K. Birla group: "He was an outstanding leader. The whole of India will mourn his death."
  - R. P. Goenka, chairman, CESC Ltd: "The turmoil of a great life has finally come to an end. India is poorer on account of the demise of Jyoti Basu."
  - Venu Srinivasan, CII president: "The nation has lost one of the tallest leaders and CII is grieved by this great loss to the political leadership of the country. India's longest-serving chief minister Jyoti Basu, served as the chief minister of West Bengal between 1977 and 2000. During his tenure, the state has made significant progress towards inclusive growth and development."

== Electoral history ==
Basu was Chief Minister of West Bengal consecutively five times and every time he was Member of Legislative Assembly from the Satgachhia (Vidhan Sabha constituency). Before that he was MLA from Baranagar seat 6 times.

Election of 1952-1996
Election year	Office held	Constituency	Party affiliation	Result
1952	Member of the legislative assembly	Baranagar	Communist Party of India	Won
1957	Member of the legislative assembly	Baranagar	Communist Party of India	Won
1962	Member of the legislative assembly	Baranagar	Communist Party of India	Won
1967	Member of the legislative assembly	Baranagar	Communist Party of India (Marxist)	Won
1969	Member of the legislative assembly	Baranagar	Communist Party of India (Marxist)	Won
1971	Member of the legislative assembly	Baranagar	Communist Party of India (Marxist)	Won
1972	Member of the legislative assembly	Baranagar	Communist Party of India (Marxist)	Lost
1977	Member of the legislative assembly	Satgachhia	Communist Party of India (Marxist)	Won
1982	Member of the legislative assembly	Satgachhia	Communist Party of India (Marxist)	Won
1987	Member of the legislative assembly	Satgachhia	Communist Party of India (Marxist)	Won
1991	Member of the legislative assembly	Satgachhia	Communist Party of India (Marxist)	Won
1996	Member of the legislative assembly	Satgachhia	Communist Party of India (Marxist)	Won

== Positions held ==
Year	Position	Place/organisation	Belonging party	Remark	Ref(s)
1941	Secretary	Bengal Assam Railroad Workers' Union	Communist Party of India	Basu was the first secretary of the union, after it formed	
1943	Representative	Calcutta Port Engineering Worker's Union, All India Trade Union Congress	Communist Party of India		
1944	Secretary	Friends of Soviet Union and Anti-Fascist Writers' Association, Kolkata			
1944	General Secretary	Bengal Nagpur Railway Worker's Union	Communist Party of India		
1944	General Secretary	Bengal Delhi Railway Worker's Union	Communist Party of India	General secretary of the combined union of Bengal Delhi Railway Worker's Uniona and Bengal Nagpur Railway Worker's Union	
1944	Secretary	All India Railwaymen's Federation	Communist Party of India		
1946	Member of Bengal Legislative Assembly	Railway employees constituency, Bengal Presidency	Communist Party of India	Railway employees constituency is under Bengal Presidency of British India	
1949	Vice-president	All India Railwaymen's Federation	Communist Party of India		
1951	President	Editorial board, Swadhinata	Communist Party of India		
1952	MLA	Baranagar	Communist Party of India		1st Legislative Assembly in the state of West Bengal
1952	General Secretary	State committee, Communist Party of India	Communist Party of India	He held the position up to January 1961	
1952	Leader of the Opposition	West Bengal Legislative Assembly	Communist Party of India	1st Legislative Assembly in the state of West Bengal	
1957	MLA	Baranagar	Communist Party of India	2nd Legislative Assembly in the state of West Bengal	
1962	MLA	Baranagar	Communist Party of India	3rd Legislative Assembly in the state of West Bengal	
1964	Founding member	Communist Party of India (Marxist)			
1964	Member	Politburo of the Communist Party of India (Marxist)	Communist Party of India (Marxist)		
1965	Founding editor	People's Democracy	Communist Party of India (Marxist)		
1967	MLA	Baranagar	Communist Party of India (Marxist)	4th Legislative Assembly in the state of West Bengal	
1969	MLA	Baranagar	Communist Party of India (Marxist)	5th Legislative Assembly in the state of West Bengal	
1970	Vice-president	Centre of Indian Trade Unions	Communist Party of India (Marxist)	Basu continued in position up to his death	
1971	MLA	Baranagar	Communist Party of India (Marxist)	6th Legislative Assembly in the state of West Bengal	
1977	MLA	Satgachhia	Communist Party of India (Marxist)	8th Legislative Assembly in the state of West Bengal	
1982	MLA	Satgachhia	Communist Party of India (Marxist)	9th Legislative Assembly in the state of West Bengal	
1987	MLA	Satgachhia	Communist Party of India (Marxist)	10th Legislative Assembly in the state of West Bengal	
1991	MLA	Satgachhia	Communist Party of India (Marxist)	11th Legislative Assembly in the state of West Bengal	
1996	MLA	Satgachhia	Communist Party of India (Marxist)	12th Legislative Assembly in the state of West Bengal	

== Awards and honours ==
=== Awards ===
- Mother Teresa award (2001)
- Special honour from Institute of Advanced Studies in Education (2005)
- "Doctor of Law", 2007, from University of Calcutta

Basu was slated to given D.Litt degree, from University of Calcutta, but he declined it.

=== Honours ===
==== National Honours ====
- India
  - Guard of honour (2010)
  - 21-gun salute (2010)

Jyoti Basu was selected to be honoured with Bharat Ratna, the highest civilian award of India, in 2008. Basu refused to take it. Basu was also given Civilian award in Calcutta Municipal Town Hall on 15 July 2005, but he refused to take it.

==== Foreign honours ====
- Bangladesh:
  - Friends of Liberation War Honour (2012)

== Published books ==
- Janaganer Sange: A Political Memoir, autobiography, two volumes (articles written by Jyoti Basu in Ganashakti, published as a book)
- Jatadur Mone pore, autobiography
- MEMORIES: The Ones That Have Lasted, a political autobiography
- Bamfront Sarkar 15 Years, 1993
- People's power in practice : 20 years of Left Front in West Bengal
- Jyoti Basu speaks
- Subversion of parliamentary democracy in West Bengal

== Personal life ==
Jyoti Basu married twice. His first wife Basanti died within two years of their marriage in 1942. In 1948, he married Basanti's sister Kamala Basu, who died on 1 October 2003. Together, they had only one son, Subhabrata (also known as Chandan), who was born in 1952. Unlike his father, Chandan has no association with either politics or communism, and is a businessman. Chandan has been hounded by allegations levied by the both Congress and Trinamool Congress of being a beneficiary of nepotism, which he has denied repeatedly.

On 17 July 1977, shortly after becoming Chief Minister of West Bengal, Jyoti Basu delivered a lecture at an event organised by Yogakshema, an organisation backed by the Rashtriya Swayamsevak Sangh, at Maharashtra Niwas in Kolkata. An account of the lecture was subsequently published in two parts in the Bengali weekly Swastika on 25 July and 1 August 1977.

In 1988, RSP leader Jatindra Chandra Chakraborty was forced to step down from his position as PWD Minister by CPI(M) following him raising allegations of nepotism against Jyoti Basu in what became known as the 'Bengal Lamp Scam' (in which he revealed financial irregularities on the part of Chief Minister Basu assigning a consignment of streetlights to a Jadavpur based loss-making firm called 'Bengal Lamp' where his son Chandan was employed at that time).

Although being an atheist and a staunch communist, Basu never interfered with the religious freedom of his second wife Kamala, who was described by her son Chandan to be a deeply religious woman.

After joining the CPI, Basu was disinherited by his father from their residence at 55A, Hindusthan Park in Gariahat locality of South Kolkata, so he lived in the houses of his friends. After becoming chief minister, Basu lived in a guest house owned by the state government in Bidhannagar.

== Recognition ==
An admirer of Vladimir Lenin, Joseph Stalin and Karl Marx, Jyoti Basu is regarded as one of the most successful politicians in India. His reign of 23 years in West Bengal as the Chief Minister was counted as the longest serving chief minister in India until this record was broken by Pawan Kumar Chamling in 2018.

In 2010, Rajarhat New Town was named after Jyoti Basu as "Jyoti Basu Nagar" in the presence of then chief minister Buddhadeb Bhattacharjee.

The Government of Bangladesh created the 201-member "Comrade Jyoti Basu Nagarik Sangsad" in the name of Basu, featuring Chief Justice of Bangladesh Supreme Court Muhammad Habibur Rahman as Convener.

A research institute has been named after Jyoti Basu named "Jyoti Basu Centre of Social Studies and Research" in Newtown, West Bengal.

== Legacy ==
Jyoti Basu has been praised for

- implementing land reforms which led to a huge boost in agricultural productivity of the state
- democratisation of panchayati raj institutions of the state
- maintaining communal harmony in midst of the Ram-mandir agitation and Mandal Commission agitation
- establishing the Haldia Industrial Belt, New Town, Salt Lake Electronics Complex and Bakreshwar Thermal Power Station
- maintaining political stability in the state in midst of Naxalite-Maoist insurgency

Following the end of 34-years of unbroken Communist rule in West Bengal which he had initiated in 1977, a year and a half after his death, despite him drafting various important social reforms, many criticized him for his controversial practices during being in power as the CM of West Bengal, listed below are some allegations which are inflicted against him:-

- causing massive deindustrialisation of the state due to his unwavering support to incessant gheraos and bandhs of Communist labour unions in the name of protecting labour rights
- initiating brain drain by abolishing English education at primary level in schools run by the state government in the name of anti-imperialism and opposing application of computers over unsubstantiated fears of increasing unemployment
- fostering favouritism by meting out preferential treatment of loyal party cadres over competent non-Communist people
- creation of a party-society by asserting dominance of conservative party ideologues in every sphere of life, most notably in bureaucratic appointments and universities
- legitimisation of political violence through his semi-Stalinist style of ruling
- authorisation of police brutalities against dissidents as seen in Marichjhapi massacre and 1993 Kolkata firing
- refusal to condemn or even take action against CPI(M) cadres committing acts of terror like the Sainbari murder, Bijon Setu massacre, 1990 Bantala rape case, 1991 Kandua hand-chopping and Nanoor massacre

Critics state that Jyoti Basu's legacy consists of:

- loadshedding (which became rampant throughout the state since his tenure as deputy CM under Ajoy Mukherjee in 1967 and continued to plague the state throughout Communist rule)
- floods (caused due to lack of development in rural areas fostered by the culture of favouritism towards fellow partymen)
- Nandan (the only major contribution of Basu's government to the city of Kolkata which saw massive deindustrialisation and political violence under his rule)
- the corporate empire of his son Chandan only

== In popular culture ==
Centre of Indian Trade Unions along with Haldia Regional Committee released an album on Jyoti Basu in 2000.

In 2005, Gautam Ghosh made a documentary film named Jyoti Basur Sange (trans. "A journey with Jyoti Basu"), which was screened at Nandan on 31 April 2005 and at another auditorium in Memari. The film tracks Basu's childhood days in Bangladesh, student life in London and political career in Calcutta. The writer Goutam Ghose trailed Jyoti Basu for eight years, from 1997 to 2004, across campaigns and countries for making the documentary.

In 2006, a CD collection was released, based on interviews with Basu, named Antaranga Jyoti Basu.

== See also ==
- List of chief ministers from the Communist Party of India (Marxist)
- List of people associated with the London School of Economics
- List of Kolkata Presidencians
- Left Front (West Bengal)

Political offices
Preceded by Siddhartha Shankar Ray	Chief Minister of West Bengal; 1977–2000	Succeeded by Buddhadeb Bhattacharya
CPI-M Party political offices
Preceded by Seat established	Member of the politburo of Communist Party of India (Marxist); 1965–2008	Succeeded by –
