= Resistance Committee =

Resistance Committee may refer to:

- Dictatorship Resistance Committee, a Ukrainian electoral alliance formed in 2011
- Popular Resistance Committees, a Palestinian militant group active in Gaza
- Popular Resistance Committees (Yemen), pro-Hadi armed groups that have fought in the Yemeni Civil War
- Price Increase and Famine Resistance Committee, a mass movement in West Bengal during the 1959 famine
- Sudanese resistance committees, a grassroots network that partook in the Sudanese Revolution
- Resistance Committee (Ukraine) Ukrainian battalion made up of anarchist, anti-authoritarian and anti-fascist volunteers
