= Chief Minister of West Bengal =

Head of the Government of West Bengal

- পশ্চিমবঙ্গের মুখ্যমন্ত্রী Paścimabaṅgera Mukhyamantrī (ISO)
- Emblem of West Bengal

- Flag of India

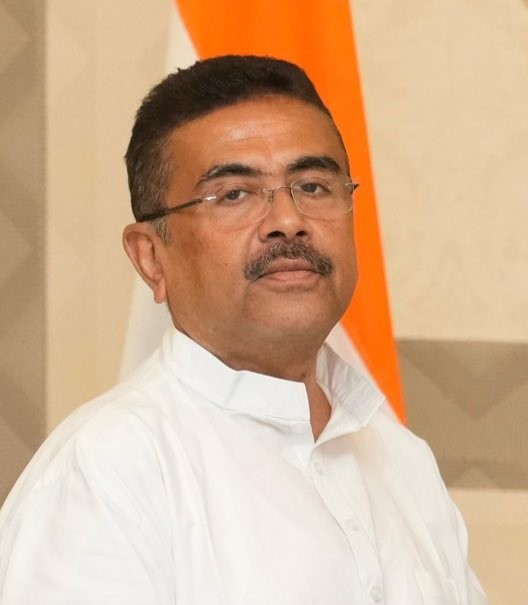
- Incumbent; Suvendu Adhikari since 9 May 2026
- Chief Minister's Office; Government of West Bengal
- Style: The Honourable (formal); Mr. Chief Minister (informal); His Excellency (diplomatic)
- Type: Head of government
- Status: Leader of the Executive
- Abbreviation: CM
- Member of: State Cabinet; Legislative Assembly
- Reports to: Governor of West Bengal; West Bengal Legislative Assembly
- Seat: Writer's Building, Kolkata
- Nominator: MLAs of the majority party or alliance
- Appointer: Governor of West Bengal; by convention based on appointees ability to command confidence in the West Bengal Legislative Assembly
- Term length: At the confidence of the assembly; Chief Minister's term is for five years and is subject to no term limits.
- Precursor: Prime Minister of Bengal
- Inaugural holder: Prafulla Chandra Ghosh (as Premier); Bidhan Chandra Ray (as Chief Minister)
- Formation: 15 August 1947 (79 years ago)
- Deputy: Deputy Chief Minister (vacant)
- Salary: ₹117,000 (US$1,200)/monthly; ₹1,404,000 (US$15,000)/annually
- Website: CMO West Bengal

The Chief Minister of West Bengal (ISO: Paścimabaṅgera Mukhyamantrī) is the de facto head of the executive branch of the Government of West Bengal, the subnational authority of the Indian state of West Bengal. The chief minister is the head of the Council of Ministers and advises the governor on the appointment of ministers. Along with the council of ministers, the chief minister exercises executive authority in the state. The governor appoints the chief minister, whose council of ministers are collectively responsible to the West Bengal Legislative Assembly. The chief minister also serves as the Leader of the House in the Legislative Assembly.

On 17 August 1947, the former British Indian province of Bengal was partitioned into the Pakistani province of East Bengal and the Indian state of West Bengal. Prafulla Chandra Ghosh of the Indian National Congress (INC) became the state's first head of government as Premier before the office of chief minister formally came into effect. Following the adoption of the Constitution of India on 26 January 1950, Dr. Bidhan Chandra Roy became the first Chief Minister of West Bengal. Between 1967 and 1972, West Bengal witnessed a prolonged period of political instability marked by three assembly elections, four coalition governments, and three periods of President's rule. Stability returned under Siddhartha Shankar Ray of the INC, who became the first chief minister after this phase to complete a full five-year term. Since independence, the state has had nine chief ministers.

The victory of the Communist Party of India (Marxist)-led Left Front in the 1977 assembly election marked the beginning of 34 years of uninterrupted Left Front rule in West Bengal. Jyoti Basu served as chief minister for over 23 years, making him the longest-serving chief minister in India at the time; the record was later surpassed in 2018 by Pawan Kumar Chamling of Sikkim. He was succeeded by Buddhadeb Bhattacharya, under whose leadership the Left Front government remained in office until its defeat in the 2011 assembly election.

In the 2011 assembly election, the Trinamool Congress defeated the Left Front, ending its 34-year rule in the state, one of the longest-serving democratically elected Communist governments in the world. The party's leader, Mamata Banerjee, was sworn in on 20 May 2011 as the first woman chief minister of West Bengal. She was subsequently re-elected in the 2016 and 2021 assembly elections.

On 7 May 2026, the Governor of West Bengal, R. N. Ravi, dissolved the 17th Assembly, ending the 15- year tenure of TMC. A 2-day vacancy in the chief ministerships of West Bengal, emerged during this period. However, no proclamation of President's rule was declared. The conclusion of this vacancy came into an effect on 9 May 2026, which the emergence of the government run by Suvendu Adhikari.

In the 2026 assembly election, the Bharatiya Janata Party won a majority in the Legislative Assembly, ending the 15-year tenure of the All India Trinamool Congress government in West Bengal. Suvendu Adhikari was sworn in as the first BJP Chief Minister of the state on 9 May 2026, coinciding with the birth anniversary of Rabindranath Tagore, in the presence of Prime Minister Narendra Modi, Union ministers, and chief ministers from several NDA-ruled states.

== Oath as the state chief minister ==
The chief minister serves five years in the office. The following is the oath of the chief minister of state:

I, <Name of Chief Minister>, do swear in the name of God/solemnly affirm that I will bear true faith and allegiance to the Constitution of India as by law established, that I will uphold the sovereignty and integrity of India, that I will faithfully and conscientiously discharge my duties as a Minister for the State of () and that I will do right to all manner of people in accordance with the Constitution and the law without fear or favour, affection or ill-will.

Oath of Secrecy

"I, [Name], do swear in the name of God / solemnly affirm that I will not directly or indirectly communicate or reveal to any person or persons any matter which shall be brought under my consideration or shall become known to me as a Minister for the State of [Name of State] except as may be required for the due discharge of my duties as such Minister." Benglish:

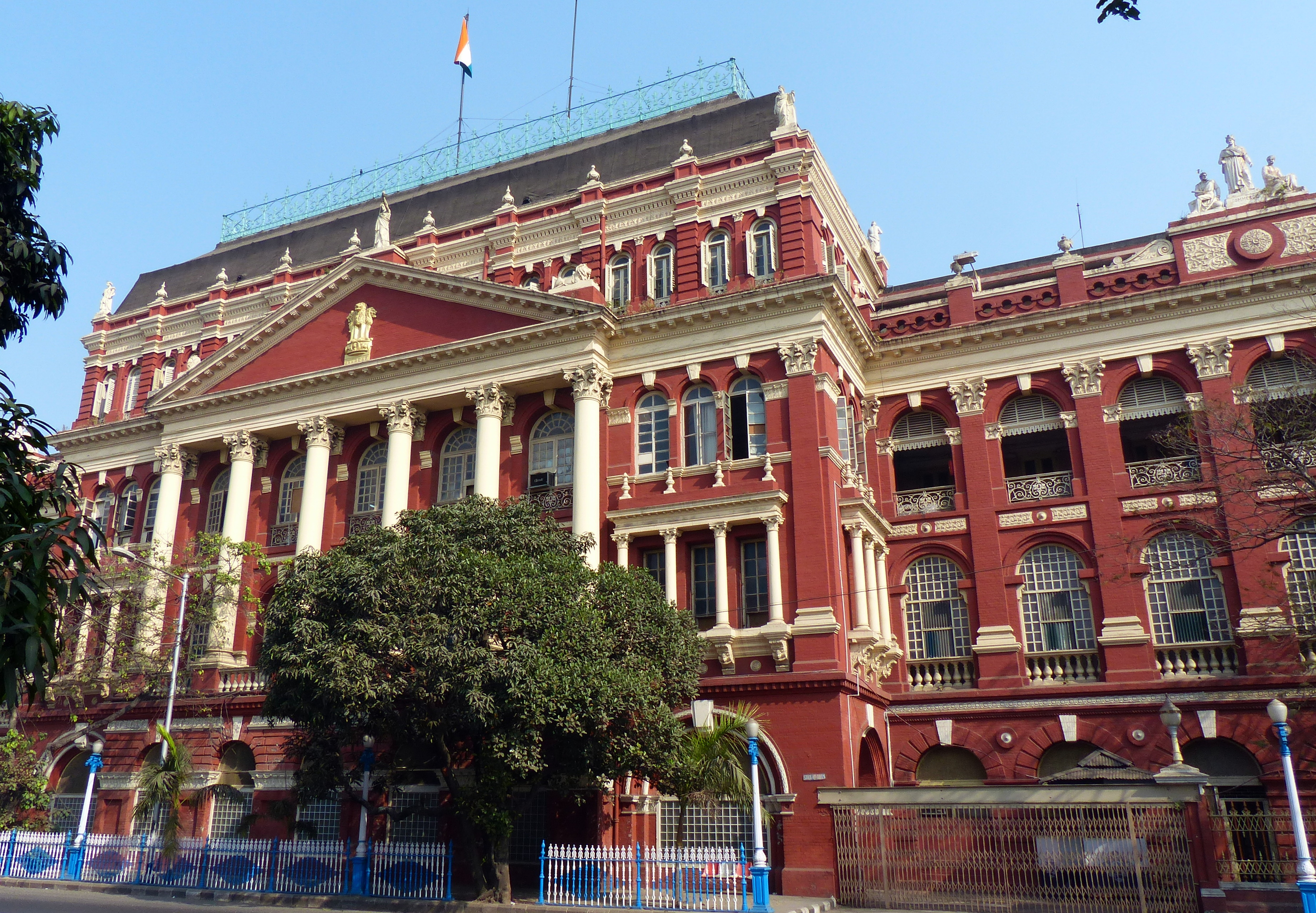
Writer's Building--West Bengal Government's Traditional Secretariat

"Ami, [Name], Ishwarer name shapath koritechhi / sotto nishthar sohit protigga koritechhi je, ami bidhi dara sthapito Bharat-er Shongbidhaner proti prokrito shrodhha o anugotto poshon koribo; ami Bharat-er sharbobhoumotto o akhandata rakhya koribo; ami [State Name] rajyer mukhhomontri hishebe amar kortobbyo nishtha o bibek-sommoto bhabe palon koribo; ebong ami bhoy ba pokkhopat, anurag ba birag-er urdhw-e uthiya, Shongbidhan o ain onujayi shob prokarer manusher proti naybichar koribo.

"Ami, [Name], Ishwarer name shapath koritechhi / driptobhabe ghoshona koritechhi je, [State Name] rajyer montri hishebe amar bibechanar jonne jaha ona hobe ba jaha amar gochor hobe, taha ami protyokkho ba porokkhobhabe konobyakti ba byaktiborgoke janatbo na ba prokash koribo na; kebolmatro montri hishebe amar kortobbyo suthubhabe paloner jonne jodi taha proyojon hoy, tobei ami taha prokash koribo.

== Premiers of West Bengal (1947–1950) ==
#	Portrait	Name	Tenure			Assembly (election)	Party
1	photo of Prafulla Chandra Ghosh	Prafulla Chandra Ghosh	15 August 1947	23 January 1948	161 days	Provincial (Note: This refers to the 90-member rump legislature that emerged following partition, representing the West Bengali constituencies of the erstwhile Bengal Legislative Assembly. It was constituted under the Government of India Act 1935, not the Indian Constitution, which was still in the process of being drafted.) (1946 election)	Indian National Congress
2		Bidhan Chandra Roy	23 January 1948	26 January 1950	2 years, 3 days	Provincial (1946 election)	Indian National Congress

== Chief Ministers of West Bengal (1950–present) ==
- ^{†} Died in office
- ^{REM} Removed

#	Portrait	Name (born – died)	Constituency	From (Note: While the tenures have been primarily sourced to a list on the West Bengal Legislative Assembly website, obvious errors (mainly around the 1969–71 period) have been corrected with the help of a historical essay from the same website.)	To	Time in office	Assembly (election)	Political Party (Alliance)	Appointed By
1		Bidhan Chandra Roy (1882 – 1962)		26 January 1950	30 March 1952	2 years, 64 days	Provincial (Note: Following the promulgation of the Constitution of India, the provincial assembly carried on as the legislative assembly of West Bengal until fresh elections could be organised in 1952.) (1946 election)	Indian National Congress (Indian National Congress+)	Kailash Nath Katju
1		Bidhan Chandra Roy (1882 – 1962)	Bowbazar	31 March 1952	5 April 1957	10 years, 92 days	1st (1952 election)	Indian National Congress (Indian National Congress+)	Harendra Coomar Mookerjee
1		Bidhan Chandra Roy (1882 – 1962)	Bowbazar	6 April 1957	2 April 1962	10 years, 92 days	2nd (1957 election)	Indian National Congress (Indian National Congress+)	Padmaja Naidu
1		Bidhan Chandra Roy (1882 – 1962)	Chowrangee	3 April 1962	1 July 1962^{[†]}	10 years, 92 days	3rd (1962 election)	Indian National Congress (Indian National Congress+)	Padmaja Naidu
2		Prafulla Chandra Sen (1897 – 1990)	Arambagh	2 July 1962	1 March 1967	4 years, 242 days	3rd (1962 election)	Indian National Congress (Indian National Congress+)	Padmaja Naidu
3		Ajoy Mukherjee (1901 – 1986)	Tamluk	1 March 1967	21 November 1967	265 days	4th (1967 election)	Bangla Congress (United Front)	Padmaja Naidu
4	photo of Prafulla Chandra Ghosh	Prafulla Chandra Ghosh (1891 – 1983)	Jhargram	21 November 1967	20 February 1968	91 days	4th (1967 election)	Independent	Dharma Vira
–		Vacant (Note: Under Article 356 of the Constitution of India, President's rule may be imposed when the "government in a state is not able to function as per the Constitution", which often happens because no party or coalition has a majority in the assembly. When President's rule is in force in a state, its council of ministers stands dissolved. The office of chief minister thus lies vacant, and the administration is taken over by the governor, who functions on behalf of the central government. At times, the legislative assembly also stands dissolved.) (President's rule)	N/A	20 February 1968	25 February 1969	1 year, 5 days	Dissolved	N/A	–
(3)		Ajoy Kumar Mukherjee (1901 – 1986)	Tamluk	25 February 1969	30 July 1970	1 year, 155 days	5th (1969 election)	Bangla Congress (United Front)	Dharma Vira
–		Vacant (President's rule)	N/A	30 July 1970	2 April 1971	246 days	Dissolved	N/A	–
(3)		Ajoy Kumar Mukherjee (1901 – 1986)	Tamluk	2 April 1971	29 June 1971	88 days	6th (1971 election)	Bangla Congress (United Front)	Shanti Swaroop Dhawan
–		Vacant (President's rule)	N/A	29 June 1971	20 March 1972	265 days	Dissolved	N/A	–
5		Siddhartha Shankar Ray (1920 – 2010)	Maldaha (by- elected)	20 March 1972	30 April 1977	5 years, 41 days	7th (1972 election)	Indian National Congress (Indian National Congress+)	Anthony Lancelot Dias
–		Vacant (President's rule)	N/A	30 April 1977	21 June 1977	52 days	Dissolved	N/A	–
6		Jyoti Basu (1914 – 2010)	Satgachhia	21 June 1977	23 May 1982	23 years, 138 days	8th (1977 election)	Communist Party of India (Marxist) (Left Front)	Anthony Lancelot Dias
6		Jyoti Basu (1914 – 2010)	Satgachhia	24 May 1982	29 March 1987	23 years, 138 days	9th (1982 election)	Communist Party of India (Marxist) (Left Front)	Bhairab Dutt Pande
6		Jyoti Basu (1914 – 2010)	Satgachhia	30 March 1987	18 June 1991	23 years, 138 days	10th (1987 election)	Communist Party of India (Marxist) (Left Front)	Saiyid Nurul Hasan
6		Jyoti Basu (1914 – 2010)	Satgachhia	19 June 1991	15 May 1996	23 years, 138 days	11th (1991 election)	Communist Party of India (Marxist) (Left Front)	Saiyid Nurul Hasan
6		Jyoti Basu (1914 – 2010)	Satgachhia	16 May 1996	6 November 2000	23 years, 138 days	12th (1996 election)	Communist Party of India (Marxist) (Left Front)	K. V. Raghunatha Reddy
7		Buddhadeb Bhattacharya (1944 – 2024)	Jadavpur	6 November 2000	14 May 2001	10 years, 195 days	12th (1996 election)	Communist Party of India (Marxist) (Left Front)	Viren J. Shah
7		Buddhadeb Bhattacharya (1944 – 2024)	Jadavpur	15 May 2001	17 May 2006	10 years, 195 days	13th (2001 election)	Communist Party of India (Marxist) (Left Front)	Viren J. Shah
7		Buddhadeb Bhattacharya (1944 – 2024)	Jadavpur	18 May 2006	20 May 2011	10 years, 195 days	14th (2006 election)	Communist Party of India (Marxist) (Left Front)	Gopalkrishna Gandhi
8		Mamata Banerjee (b. 1955)	Bhabanipur (by- elected) (Note: She was the sitting MP of Kolkata Dakshin when she was sworn in. She became an MLA on 16 November 2011.)	20 May 2011	25 May 2016	14 years, 352 days	15th (2011 election)	Trinamool Congress (United Progressive Alliance (till 2012); Trinamool Congress+ (from 2012))	M. K. Narayanan
8		Mamata Banerjee (b. 1955)	Bhabanipur	26 May 2016	4 May 2021	14 years, 352 days	16th (2016 election)	Trinamool Congress (United Progressive Alliance (till 2012); Trinamool Congress+ (from 2012))	Keshari Nath Tripathi
8		Mamata Banerjee (b. 1955)	Bhabanipur (by- elected) (Note: She contested the Nandigram at the time of the elections. However, she lost the seat to Suvendu Adhikari. She became a by-elected MLA on 7 October 2021.)	5 May 2021	7 May 2026^{[REM]}	14 years, 352 days	17th (2021 election)	Trinamool Congress (United Progressive Alliance (till 2012); Trinamool Congress+ (from 2012))	Jagdeep Dhankar
–		Vacant (Note: Imposed by Governor R. N. Ravi) Governor's Rule	N/A	7 May 2026	9 May 2026	2 days	Dissolved	N/A	–
9		Suvendu Adhikari (b. 1970)	Bhabanipur (Note: He also contested Nandigram and won, but resigned from there.)	9 May 2026	Incumbent	181 days	18th (2026 election)	Bharatiya Janata Party (National Democratic Alliance)	R. N. Ravi

== Chief ministerial constituencies of West Bengal ==
Indicator	Meaning
Multiple entry	Constituency has been represented by more than one Chief Ministerial tenure/entry.
+	Current Chief Minister's constituency.
Longest serving	Constituency with the longest continuous Chief Ministerial representation.

#	Constituency	Political Parties	Chief Minister	From	To	Time in office	Notes
1	Bowbazar	Indian National Congress	Bidhan Chandra Roy	31 March 1952	5 April 1957	5 years, 5 days	
2	Bowbazar	Indian National Congress	Bidhan Chandra Roy	6 April 1957	2 April 1962	4 years, 361 days	
3	Chowrangee	Indian National Congress	Bidhan Chandra Roy	3 April 1962	1 July 1962	89 days	
4	Arambagh	Indian National Congress	Prafulla Chandra Sen	2 July 1962	1 March 1967	4 years, 242 days	
5	Tamluk	Bangla Congress	Ajoy Mukherjee	1 March 1967	21 November 1967	265 days	
6	Jhargram	Independent	Prafulla Chandra Ghosh	21 November 1967	20 February 1968	91 days	
7	Tamluk	Bangla Congress	Ajoy Mukherjee	25 February 1969	30 July 1970	1 year, 155 days	
8	Tamluk	Indian National Congress	Ajoy Mukherjee	2 April 1971	29 June 1971	88 days	
9	Maldaha	Indian National Congress	Siddhartha Shankar Ray	20 March 1972	30 April 1977	5 years, 41 days	
10	Satgachhia	Communist Party of India (Marxist)	Jyoti Basu	21 June 1977	6 November 2000	23 years, 138 days	Longest continuous period
11	Jadavpur	Communist Party of India (Marxist)	Buddhadeb Bhattacharjee	6 November 2000	20 May 2011	10 years, 195 days	
12	Bhabanipur	Trinamool Congress	Mamata Banerjee	20 May 2011	7 May 2026	14 years, 352 days	Multiple CM entry
13	+ Bhabanipur	Bharatiya Janata Party	Suvendu Adhikari	9 May 2026	Incumbent	181 days	Multiple CM entry; current constituency

== Statistics ==
Fraction of time of holding CMO by party in West Bengal (as of 6/ 11 /2026)
1. Communist Party of India (Marxist) (42.9%)
2. Indian National Congress (31.5%)
3. Trinamool Congress (18.9%)
4. Bharatiya Janata Party (0.35%)
5. President's rule (3.77%)
6. Bangla Congress (2.26%)
7. Independent (0.32%)
8. Office vacant/Governor's Rule (Note: The office remained vacant on 8 May 2026 following the dissolution of the outgoing ministry by Governor R. N. Ravi on the night of 7 May 2026, amid outgoing chief minister Mamata Banerjee's refusal to resign after the election defeat. Suvendu Adhikari was sworn in as chief minister at 11:34 on 9 May 2026.) (0.00%)

=== Timeline of Chief Minister ===
# (Note: Durations are calculated proportionally from percentage share and expressed in years and days.; Figures are rounded to the nearest day.)	Name	Political Party	Time in office	
#	Name	Political Party	Longest tenure	Total tenure
1	Jyoti Basu	CPI(M)	23 years, 138 days	23 years, 138 days
2	Mamata Banerjee	TMC	14 years, 352 days	14 years, 352 days
3	Buddhadeb Bhattacharya	CPI(M)	10 years, 195 days	10 years, 195 days
4	Bidhan Chandra Roy	INC	10 years, 92 days	10 years, 92 days
5	Siddhartha Shankar Ray	INC	5 years, 41 days	5 years, 41 days
6	Prafulla Chandra Sen	INC	4 years, 242 days	4 years, 242 days
7	Ajoy Kumar Mukherjee	BC / INC	1 year, 155 days	2 years, 139 days
8	Suvendu Adhikari	BJP	181 days	181 days
9	Prafulla Chandra Ghosh	IND	91 days	91 days

Total duration of President's rule: 930 days (approximately 2 years and 200 days)

Total duration of Governor's rule: 2 days

=== Timeline of political parties ===
#	Political party	Tenure
1	Communist Party of India (Marxist)	33 years, 333 days
2	Trinamool Congress	14 years, 352 days
3	Indian National Congress	14 years, 336 days (Note: Excluding the term from 1948 to 1952) (Note: Term between 30 March 1952 and 1 March 1967)
4	Indian National Congress	5 years, 41 days (Note: Term between March 1972 and 30 April 1977)
5	Bangla Congress	1 year, 155 days (Note: Term between 25 February 1969 and 30 July 1970)
6	Bangla Congress	265 days (Note: Term between 1 March 1967 and 21 November 1967)
7	Independent	91 days
8	Indian National Congress	88 days (Note: Term between 2 April 1971 and 29 June 1971)
9	Bharatiya Janata Party	181 days

=== Timeline of alliances (national) ===
#	Alliance	Tenure
1	INDIA (Note: 'INDIA' is referred to the alliance with its respect working since 2023. During the term between 21 June 1977 and 2023, the alliance wasn't known as INDIA.) (Note: The term between 21 June 1977 and 7 May 2026.)	48 years, 320 days
2	INDIA (Note: Term between 30 March 1952 and 1 March 1967)	14 years, 336 days
3	INDIA (Note: Term between March 1972 and 30 April 1977)	5 years, 41 days
4	INDIA (Note: Term between 21 February 1969 and 30 July 1970)	1 year, 155 days
5	None (Note: None does not means President's or Governor's rule. It indicates the two political parties, Independent and Bangla Congress, which did not have an alliance when it was in power.)	356 days
6	INDIA (Note: Term between 2 April 1971 and 29 June 1971)	88 days
7	NDA	181 days

== See also ==
- History of Bengal
- Bengal Presidency
- List of rulers of Bengal
- Prime Minister of Bengal
- History of West Bengal
- List of governors of West Bengal
- List of deputy chief ministers of West Bengal
- List of West Bengal ministries
- West Bengal Legislative Assembly
- Elections in West Bengal
- Chief Minister (India)
