= Shiba Pada Bhattacharjee =

Indian politician

Member of West Bengal Legislative Assembly
- In office 1972–77
- Preceded by: Jyoti Basu
- Succeeded by: Matish Roy
- Constituency: Baranagar

Personal details
- Born: 28 April 1936
- Died: 2010 (aged 74)
- Party: Communist Party of India

Shiba Pada Bhattacharjee (28 April 1936 – 2010) is an Indian politician belonging to the Communist Party of India. He was elected to the West Bengal Legislative Assembly from Baranagar constituency in 1972 defeating Jyoti Basu by over 38,987 votes. He earlier used to be a campaigner for Jyoti Basu in earlier elections in Baranagar when the Communist Party of India was undivided.
