= List of deputy chief ministers of West Bengal =

2nd highest ranking Minister in state government

Deputy Chief Minister of West Bengal
- Incumbent; Vacant since 5 November 2000
- Abbreviation: DCM
- Appointer: Governor of West Bengal
- Inaugural holder: Jyoti Basu
- Formation: March 1, 1967; 59 years ago

The deputy chief minister of West Bengal is the deputy head of Government of West Bengal. The seat is now vacant since 5 November 2000 after former deputy chief minister Buddhadeb Bhattacharjee. In today's current government, there is no deputy chief minister in West Bengal.The position of deputy chief minister is not explicitly defined or mentioned in the Constitution of India. However, the Supreme Court of India has stated that the appointment of deputy chief ministers is not unconstitutional. The court has clarified that a deputy chief minister, for all practical purposes, remains a minister in the council of ministers headed by the chief minister and does not draw a higher salary or perks compared to other ministers.During the absence of the chief minister, the deputy-chief minister may chair cabinet meetings and lead the assembly majority. Various deputy chief ministers have also taken the oath of secrecy in line with the one that chief minister takes. This oath has also sparked controversies.

== List ==
No.	Portrait	Deputy Chief Ministers (Constituency)	Party	Term in office			Chief Minister	
No.	Portrait	Deputy Chief Ministers (Constituency)	Party	Term start	Term end	Duration	Name	Party
1		Jyoti Basu (Baranagar)	Communist Party of India (Marxist)	1 March 1967	21 November 1967	265 days	Ajoy Mukherjee	Bangla Congress
1		Jyoti Basu (Baranagar)	Communist Party of India (Marxist)	25 February 1969	16 March 1970	1 year, 19 days	Ajoy Mukherjee	Bangla Congress
2		Bijoy Singh Nahar (Bowbazar)	Indian National Congress	2 April 1971	28 June 1971	87 days	Ajoy Mukherjee	Bangla Congress
3		Buddhadeb Bhattacharjee (Jadavpur)	Communist Party of India (Marxist)	12 January 1999	5 November 2000	1 year, 298 days	Jyoti Basu	Communist Party of India (Marxist)

== Statistics ==
List of deputy chief ministers by length of term

No.	Name	Party	Length of term	
No.	Name	Party	Longest continuous term	Total years of deputy chief ministership
1	Buddhadeb Bhattacharjee	CPI(M)	1 year, 298 days	1 year, 298 days
2	Jyoti Basu	CPI(M)	1 year, 19 days	1 year, 283 days
3	Bijoy Singh Nahar	INC	87 days	87 days

== Oath as the state deputy chief minister ==
The deputy chief minister serves five years in the office. The following is the oath of the Deputy chief minister of state:

I, <Name of Deputy Chief Minister>, do swear in the name of God/solemnly affirm that I will bear true faith and allegiance to the Constitution of India as by law established, that I will uphold the sovereignty and integrity of India, that I will faithfully and conscientiously discharge my duties as a Minister for the State of () and that I will do right to all manner of people in accordance with the Constitution and the law without fear or favour, affection or ill-will.

Oath of Secrecy

"I, [Name], do swear in the name of God / solemnly affirm that I will not directly or indirectly communicate or reveal to any person or persons any matter which shall be brought under my consideration or shall become known to me as a Minister for the State of [Name of State] except as may be required for the due discharge of my duties as such Minister.Benglish: "Ami, [Name], Ishwarer name shapath koritechhi / driptobhabe ghoshona koritechhi je, ami biniyomito bhabe sthapito Bharat-er Shongbidhaner proti prokrito bishwash o anugotto poshwan koribo; ami Bharat-er sharbovoumotto o akhandata rakhya koribo; ami [State Name] rajyer montri hishebe amar kortobbyo nishtha o bibek-er shathe palon koribo; ebong ami bhoy ba pokkhopat, anurag ba birag-er urdhw-e uthiya, Shongbidhan o ain onujayi shob prokarer manusher proti naybichar koribo.""Ami, [Name], Ishwarer name shapath koritechhi / driptobhabe ghoshona koritechhi je, [State Name] rajyer montri hishebe amar bibechanar jonne jaha ona hobe ba jaha amar gochor hobe, taha ami protyokkho ba porokkhobhabe konobyakti ba byaktiborgoke janatbo na ba prokash koribo na; kebolmatro montri hishebe amar kortobbyo suthubhabe paloner jonne jodi taha proyojon hoy, tobei ami taha prokash koribo."
