= Bijoy Singh Nahar =

Indian politician

Member of Parliament, Lok Sabha
- In office 1977–1980
- Preceded by: Ashoke Kumar Sen
- Succeeded by: Ashoke Kumar Sen
- Constituency: Calcutta North West

2nd Deputy Chief Minister of West Bengal
- In office 2 April 1971 – 28 June 1971
- Chief Minister: Ajoy Kumar Mukherjee
- Preceded by: Jyoti Basu
- Succeeded by: Buddhadeb Bhattacharjee

Member of West Bengal Legislative Assembly
- In office 1962–1977
- Preceded by: Dr. Bidhan Chandra Roy
- Succeeded by: Abul Hasan
- Constituency: Bowbazar

Personal details
- Born: 7 November 1906 Azimganj, Bengal Presidency, British India (now Azimganj, West Bengal, India)
- Died: 15 June 1997 (aged 90) Calcutta (now Kolkata), West Bengal, India
- Party: Indian National Congress; Janata Party

Bijoy Singh Nahar (7 November 1906 – 15 June 1997) was an Indian politician who served as the deputy chief minister of West Bengal. He was a Member of Parliament, representing Calcutta North West in the Lok Sabha, the lower house of India's Parliament representing the Janata Party.
