= Mohit Mitra =

Indian politician

Member of Parliament, Lok Sabha
- In office 1956–1957
- Constituency: Calcutta North East

Personal details
- Party: Communist Party of India

Mohit Mitra (alternatively, Mohit Moitra) was an Indian politician and former member of the Lok Sabha of India. He served as a representative of the Calcutta North East constituency between 1956 and 1957 as a member of the Communist Party of India. He was also the member of the Central Committee of the Communist Party as its secretary of linguistic reorganisation of state. Following the death of Meghnad Saha, Mitra was appointed as the candidate for the Calcutta North East constituency for a by-election in 1956 and his candidacy was declared a political statement in opposition to the proposed merger of Bihar and West Bengal. He subsequently won the election with a reportedly "huge margin". The Calcutta North East constituency was abolished for the 1957 Indian general election while Mitra contested and lost on the seat of Calcutta North West.
