= People's Democracy (newspaper) =

Indian newspaper

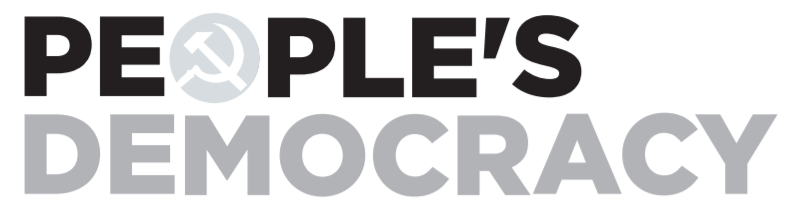
- Type: Weekly newspaper
- Founder: Jyoti Basu
- Editor: Prakash Karat
- Founded: 1965
- Political alignment: Communism; Marxism-Leninism
- Website: peoplesdemocracy.in

People's Democracy is the English weekly newspaper of the Communist Party of India (Marxist). Prakash Karat, CPI(M) Polit Bureau member, is the editor of the newspaper. The newspaper has six editions, published from New Delhi, Kolkata, Hyderabad, Chennai, Agartala, and Kochi.

== History ==
People's Democracy was founded in 1965 with Jyoti Basu as the founding editor. It had a circulation of about 25,000 copies in 2006.

=== Former editors ===
- Jyoti Basu
- Sunil Maitra
- Sitaram Yechury

== Columns ==
=== Economic notes ===
This column discusses economic developments and issues in both the international and national arena. Authors who writes here include Prabhat Patnaik and C. P. Chandrashekhar.

=== Policy Matters ===
Authors include Archana Prasad.

=== Science and Development Issues ===
This section covers current technological developments with social impacts authored by Prabir Purkayastha, Raghu, and others.

=== Working Class Issues ===
Worker's movements, trade union activities and issues concerning the working class are detailed here.

=== International ===
International events and issues. Authors include Yohannan Chemerapally.

Other columns include Current Issues and Book Reviews.
