= Snehansu Kanta Acharya =

Leader of the Communist Party of India (1913–1986)

Snehangshu Kanta Acharya, barrister (1 September 1913 – 27 August 1986), was an Advocate General of West Bengal, India and a political leader.

== Background and education ==
He was the son of Sashi Kanta Acharya Chaudhuri, a former Maharaja of Mymensingh, a premier zamindar in Bengal. The Maharajas of Mymensingh were the wealthiest and senior most zamindars of the district of Mymensingh and ranked high in the order of precedence in the Government House in Calcutta. Mymensingh was the predecessor estate of most other zamindaris of the district. He studied at Scottish Church College, and later at the University of Calcutta. He was called to the Bar by the Honourable Society of Gray's Inn in London.

== Family ==
His wife, Supriya Acharya (Mukhopadhyaya), daughter of Bengali writer Sourindra Mohan Mukhopadhyaya was also an active member of Communist Party of India (Marxist). His son, Sourangshu Kanta Acharya, is a doctor and his daughter, Bijoya Goswami, is a Sanskrit scholar. Famous singer Suchitra Mitra was his sister-in law.

== Political career ==
He was a member of the Indian Students Group Movement, during the freedom struggle. This movement was formed in support of Socialist (Marxist) ideology, to protest against colonial rule of India and to counteract fascism. He worked as rescue volunteer in the time of 1946 riot in Kolkata before joining the Communist Party of India. He was closely associated with the former chief minister of West Bengal, Jyoti Basu. He had received the First Order of Merit of Syria in 1957 and had led several delegations to Europe, Asia and Africa. Acharya served as the Advocate General of West Bengal in two terms from 1969 to 1970 and 1977 to 1986.

== Memoirs ==
A law college, Snehanshu Kanta Acharya Institute of Law (SKAIL) was established in his name under University of Kalyani. It is situated in the university campus.

== See also ==
- Major Zamindars of Mymensingh
