= Lal Behari Das =

Indian politician (in office 1956–1957)

Member of West Bengal Legislative Assembly
- In office 1956–1957
- Constituency: Khejuri constituency

Personal details
- Party: Praja Socialist Party

Lal Behari Das was an Indian politician and former member of the West Bengal Legislative Assembly. He served as the representative of the Khejuri constituency between 1956 and 1957 as a member of the Praja Socialist Party. He was elected to the constituency in a by-election and his candidacy was supported by the Communist Party of India which campaigned in opposition to the proposed merger of West Bengal and Bihar. The Khejuri constituency was abolished for the 1957 West Bengal Legislative Assembly election while Das contested and lost on the seat of Bhagawanpur.
