= Price Increase and Famine Resistance Committee =

The Price Increase and Famine Resistance Committee was a mass movement in West Bengal, India, formed in late 1958 by the Communist Party of India and other left groups, in response to the ongoing food crisis. The PIFRC led one of the most massive and militant political campaigns in the history of West Bengal. The PIFRC demanded total price controls, immediate redistribution of state lands and confiscations without compensation of excessive private lands owned by landlords. The tactics of PIFRC included scouting for hidden rice storages and forced sales of confiscated rice.

== August–September 1959 ==
The PIFRC stepped up its agitations in August 1959. The organization put forward August 20, 1959 as the date to initiate mass resistance to force the state government either to accept these demands or to resign. In mid-1959, 35 prominent organisers of PIFRC were put under preventive detention. The detainees includes seven members of the legislative assembly. The movement reached its peak as a general strike was organised in Calcutta and surrounding districts in August–September 1959. The strike paralysed the entire city and its adjoining districts. On August 31, 1959, more than 20 demonstrators were killed by police bullets.

== Aftermath ==
When the state government accepted the demands of PIFRC, the campaign was called off. In total, 39 people were killed during the agitations. 12 845 persons had been arrested, out of them 200 CPI leaders and 50 leaders of other left parties. Prominent communist leaders, like Jyoti Basu and Hare Krishna Konar, had gone underground to escape arrest.

In memory of those killed on August 31, 1959, left parties in Kolkata commemorate August 31 as 'Martyr's Day'.

== Impact inside CPI ==
Marcus Franda claims that the 1959 food movement affected the internal debates with the CPI in West Bengal. According to him, the militant campaign against the Congress state government was used by the leftist, anti-Congress sectors within the party to subdue those sectors that sought tactical cooperation with Congress. The thesis that the food movement was divisive to the party was also put forward by The Statesman at the time.
