= Koratala Satyanarayana =

Indian politician

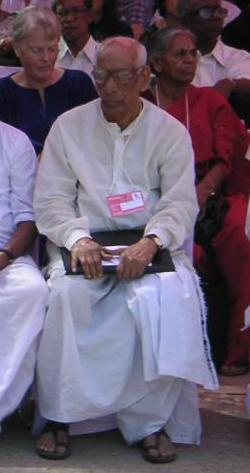
- Satyanarayana at the 18th party congress in Delhi, 2005
- Born: September 24, 1923; Pyaparru, Guntur district, Madras presidency
- Died: July 1, 2006 (aged 82); Hyderabad
- Occupation: politician

Koratala Satyanarayana (24 September 1923 – 1 July 2006) was a communist politician from Andhra Pradesh, India. He was a Politburo member of the Communist Party of India (Marxist) (CPI(M)).

== Electoral representation ==
Koratala Satyanarayana was born in the village of Pyaparru, Guntur district, Andhra Pradesh. He joined the Indian independence movement in the 1940s.

In the first general elections, held in 1952, Koratala contested in the Tenali Lok Sabha constituency. He lost with a slender margin of 1100 votes.

He was elected to the Legislative Assembly of Andhra Pradesh in 1962, when he stood as a candidate in the Repalle constituency. In 1978, he was elected from the Repalle constituency. In 1962, he had been a candidate of the Communist Party of India and in 1978, he was a member of the CPI(M).

He led a team for survey, basing on which the Party adopted a resolution ‘On Certain Agrarian Issues’. Though not a regular writer, Koratala used to contribute to newspapers depending on the need of the hour.

In 1967 Koratala was first elected to the state committee of the CPI(M) and in 1978 to the state secretariat. He was a member of Party central committee from 1982 until his death. He was the Party state secretary between 1991 and 1997. He served as Politburo member of the Party between 2002 and 2005.

He visited China and Bulgaria as part of the Party central committee team which toured for 25 days.

== Death ==
Koratala Satyanarayana died from cancer on 1 July 2006 at his home in Hyderabad, Telangana. He was survived by wife, two sons and a daughter.
