= Baranagar Assembly constituency =

Baranagar
- Constituency No. 113 for the West Bengal Legislative Assembly
- Interactive Map Outlining Baranagar Assembly Constituency

Constituency details
- Country: India
- Region: East India
- State: West Bengal
- District: North 24 Parganas
- Lok Sabha constituency: Dum Dum
- Established: 1951
- Total electors: 1,86,541 (2026); Men: 90,690; Women: 95,847; Third Gender: 4
- Reservation: None

Member of Legislative Assembly
- 18th West Bengal Legislative Assembly
- Incumbent Sajal Ghosh
- Party: BJP
- Alliance: NDA
- Elected year: 2026
- Preceded by: Sayantika Banerjee

Baranagar Assembly constituency is a Legislative Assembly constituency of North 24 Parganas district in the Indian state of West Bengal.

Most successful parties from Baranagar assembly
1. Trinamool Congress (4 times) (21.1%)
2. Communist Party of India (Marxist) (3 times) (15.8%)
3. Revolutionary Socialist Party (7 times) (36.8%)
4. Communist Party of India (4 times) (21.1%)
5. Bharatiya Janata Party (1 time) (5.26%)

== Overview ==
As per orders of the Delimitation Commission, No. 113 Baranagar Assembly constituency is composed of the following: Baranagar Municipality and Ward Nos.17 to 20 of Kamarhati Municipality.

Baranagar Assembly constituency is part of No. 16 Dum Dum (Lok Sabha constituency).

== Members of the Legislative Assembly ==
Year	Name	Party
1952	Jyoti Basu	Communist Party of India
1957	Jyoti Basu	Communist Party of India
1962	Jyoti Basu	Communist Party of India
1967	Jyoti Basu	Communist Party of India (Marxist)
1969	Jyoti Basu	Communist Party of India (Marxist)
1971	Jyoti Basu	Communist Party of India (Marxist)
1972	Shiba Pada Bhattacharjee	Communist Party of India
1977	Matish Roy	Revolutionary Socialist Party
1982	Matish Roy	Revolutionary Socialist Party
1987	Matish Roy	Revolutionary Socialist Party
1991	Matish Roy	Revolutionary Socialist Party
1996	Amar Choudhury	Revolutionary Socialist Party
2001	Amar Choudhury	Revolutionary Socialist Party
2006	Amar Choudhury	Revolutionary Socialist Party
2011	Tapas Roy	Trinamool Congress
2016	Tapas Roy	Trinamool Congress
2021	Tapas Roy	Trinamool Congress
2024^	Sayantika Banerjee	Trinamool Congress
2026	Sajal Ghosh	Bharatiya Janata Party

- ^ denotes by-election

== Election results ==
Vote share of Winning Candidates
Year	Percent
2026	48.26%
2024	43.04%
2021	53.42%
2016	48.79%
2011	60.58%
2006	51.43%
2001	48.08%
1996	48.51%
1991	46.90%
1987	50.60%
1982	58.32%
1977	53.91%
1972	69.63%
1971	57.31%
1969	61.79%
1967	52.50%
1962	56.97%
1957	59.24%
1951	56.20%

Year-wise Voter Turnout
Year	Percent
2026	90.78%
2024	73.48%
2021	73.59%
2016	76.98%
2011	79.46%
2006	78.38%
2001	77.88%
1996	79.95%
1991	73.85%
1987	72.02%
1982	72%
1977	46.43%
1972	87.42%
1971	72.27%
1969	78.48%
1967	74.16%
1962	74.92%
1957	66.68%
1951	43.66%

=== 2026 ===
2026 West Bengal Legislative Assembly election: Baranagar
Party	Candidate	Votes	%	±%
BJP	Sajal Ghosh	81,730	48.26	▲16.77
AITC	Sayantika Banerjee	64,774	38.25	▼15.17
CPI(M)	Sayandeep Mitra	18,689	11.04	
NOTA	None of the above	1,197	0.71	▼0.77
Majority		16,956	10.01	▼11.92
Turnout		169,347	90.73	▲17.14
BJP gain from AITC		Swing		

==== 2024 bypoll ====
2024 West Bengal Legislative Assembly by-election: Baranagar
Party	Candidate	Votes	%	±%
AITC	Sayantika Banerjee	69,251	43.04	−10.38
BJP	Sajal Ghosh	61,103	37.98	+6.49
CPI(M)	Tanmoy Bhattacharya	26,735	16.62	+4.06
Independent	Shubhrangshu Bhakta	545	0.33	
Independent	Sajal Kumar Ghosh	428	0.26	
SUCI(C)	Samar Krishna Singha	410	0.25	
Independent	Prasenjit Dey	224	0.14	
NOTA	None of the above	1,678	1.04	
Majority		8,148	5.06	
Turnout		1,60,885	73.48	
AITC hold		Swing		

=== 2021 ===
In the 2021 election, Tapas Roy of AITC defeated his nearest rival Parno Mitra of BJP.

2021 West Bengal Legislative Assembly election: Baranagar
Party	Candidate	Votes	%	±%
AITC	Tapas Roy	85,615	53.42	
BJP	Parno Mitra	50,468	31.49	
INC	Amal Kumar Mukhopadhyay	20,135	12.56	
NOTA	None of the above	2,378	1.48	
Majority		35,147	21.93	
Turnout		160,259	73.59	
AITC hold		Swing		

=== 2016 ===
In the 2016 election, Tapas Roy of AITC defeated his nearest rival Sukumar Ghosh of RSP.

2016 West Bengal Legislative Assembly election: Baranagar
Party	Candidate	Votes	%	±%
AITC	Tapas Roy	76,531	48.79	−11.79
RSP	Sukumar Ghosh	60,431	38.52	+2.76
BJP	Sunil Dey	14,172	9.03	+6.62
Independent	Shyamal Chandra Karmakar	901	0.57	
RJSP	Prabir Chatterjee	704	0.45	
NOTA	None of the above	4,129	2.63	
Majority		16,100	10.27	
Turnout		1,56,868	76.98	
AITC hold		Swing		

=== 2011 ===
In the 2011 elections, Tapas Roy of AITC defeated his nearest rival Sukumar Ghosh of RSP.

2011 West Bengal Legislative Assembly election: Baranagar
Party	Candidate	Votes	%	±%
AITC	Tapas Roy	89,883	60.58	+20.15
RSP	Sukumar Ghosh	53,055	35.76	−15.67
BJP	Bijoy Sankar Agarwal	3,581	2.41	
Independent	Sovan Bhattacharya	1,853	1.25	
Majority		36,828	24.82	
Turnout		1,48,372	79.46	
AITC gain from RSP		Swing	17.91	

.# Swing calculated on Congress + Trinamool Congress vote percentages taken together in 2006.

=== 2006 ===
2006 West Bengal Legislative Assembly election: Baranagar
Party	Candidate	Votes	%	±%
RSP	Amar Choudhury	85,584	51.43	+3.35
AITC	Atin Ghosh	67,428	40.43	−6.23
INC	Purnendu Bimal Dutta (Kalidas)	8,257	4.96	
BSP	Moumita Pal (Marik)	1,283	0.77	
Independent	Tridib Sinha	1,193	0.71	
Independent	Sukha Ranjan Banik	1,100	0.66	
Turnout		1,66,383	78.38	
Majority		18,156	11	
RSP hold		Swing	3.35	

=== 2001 ===
2001 West Bengal Legislative Assembly election: Baranagar
Party	Candidate	Votes	%	±%
RSP	Amar Choudhury	85,647	48.08	−0.43
AITC	Atin Ghosh	83,106	46.66	
BJP	Hemen Guha Roy	6,298	3.54	−3.02
Independent	Anindya Dasgupta	1,545	0.87	
Independent	Sukha Ranjan Banik	1,526	0.86	
Turnout		1,78,122	77.88	
Majority		2,541	1.42	
RSP hold		Swing		

=== 1996 ===
1996 West Bengal Legislative Assembly election: Baranagar
Party	Candidate	Votes	%	±%
RSP	Amar Choudhury	84,785	48.51	+1.61
INC	Shilbhadra Dutta	76,895	44.00	+5.2
BJP	Raiharan Debnath	11,470	6.56	−5.93
Independent	Baidyanath Biswas	858	0.49	
Social Action Party	Arun Sikdar	766	0.44	
Turnout		1,74,774	79.95	
Majority		7,890	4.51	
RSP hold		Swing	-3.59	

=== 1991 ===
1991 West Bengal Legislative Assembly election: Baranagar
Party	Candidate	Votes	%	±%
RSP	Matish Roy	66,397	46.90	−3.7
INC	Ajoy Ghosal	54,925	38.80	−5.89
BJP	Nikhil Sarkar	17,688	12.49	
JP	Prabir Gupta	1,111	0.78	
Independent	Sadhan Chakraborty	837	0.59	
ABJS	Rabindra Kumar Bal	616	0.44	
Turnout		1,41,574	73.85	
Majority		11,472	8.10	
RSP hold		Swing	2.19	

=== 1987 ===
1987 West Bengal Legislative Assembly election: Baranagar
Party	Candidate	Votes	%	±%
RSP	Matish Roy	61,456	50.60	−7.72
INC	Pranab Kanti Ghosh	54,277	44.69	+4.26
Independent	Prabodh Ranjan Roy	3,605	2.97	
Independent	Sambhu Nath Dutta	1,507	1.24	
Independent	Swapan Marik	217	0.18	
Independent	Babu Mukherjee	215	0.18	
Independent	Sripati Ranjan Majumdar	177	0.15	
Turnout		1,21,454	72.02	
Majority		7,179	5.91	
RSP hold		Swing		

=== 1982 ===
1982 West Bengal Legislative Assembly election: Baranagar
Party	Candidate	Votes	%	±%
RSP	Matish Roy	59,985	58.32	+4.41
INC	Sambhu Nath Dutta	41,581	40.43	+13.3
JP	Tilak Ganguly	1,064	1.03	−15
Independent	Hari Sankar Chakravorty	224	0.22	
Turnout		1,02,854	72	
Majority		18,404	17.89	
RSP hold		Swing		

=== 1977 ===
1977 West Bengal Legislative Assembly election: Baranagar
Party	Candidate	Votes	%	±%
RSP	Matish Roy	33,384	53.91	
INC	Kumud Bhattacharjee	16,798	27.13	
JP	Dwijesh Dutta Majumder	9,929	16.03	
CPI	Shiba Pada Bhattacharjee	1,404	2.27	−67.36
Independent	Bikash Mazumder	268	0.43	
Independent	Amar Majumdar	139	0.22	
Turnout		61,922	46.43	
Majority		16,586	26.78	
RSP gain from CPI		Swing	60.63	

=== 1972 ===
1972 West Bengal Legislative Assembly election: Baranagar
Party	Candidate	Votes	%	±%
CPI	Shiba Pada Bhattacharjee	69,145	69.63	
CPI(M)	Jyoti Basu	30,158	30.37	−26.94
Turnout		99,303	87.42	
Majority		38,987	39.26	
CPI gain from CPI(M)		Swing	48.29	

=== 1971 ===
1971 West Bengal Legislative Assembly election: Baranagar
Party	Candidate	Votes	%	±%
CPI(M)	Jyoti Basu	43,340	57.31	−4.48
Bangla Congress	Ajoy Kumar Mukherjee	32,287	42.69	
Turnout		75,627	72.27	
Majority		11,053	14.62	
CPI(M) hold		Swing		

=== 1969 ===
1969 West Bengal Legislative Assembly election: Baranagar
Party	Candidate	Votes	%	±%
CPI(M)	Jyoti Basu	45,261	61.79	+9.29
INC	A.N. Bhattacharjee	27,669	37.77	−8.94
Independent	Sudhangsu Bakshi	317	0.43	
Turnout		73,247	78.48	
Majority		17,592	24.02	
CPI(M) hold		Swing		

=== 1967 ===
1967 West Bengal Legislative Assembly election: Baranagar
Party	Candidate	Votes	%	±%
CPI(M)	Jyoti Basu	31,354	52.50	−4.47
INC	N. Bhattacharjee	27,895	46.71	+8.45
Independent	B.H. Rao	472	0.79	
Turnout		59,721	74.16	
Majority		3,459	5.79	
CPI(M) gain from CPI		Swing		

=== 1962 ===
1962 West Bengal Legislative Assembly election: Baranagar
Party	Candidate	Votes	%	±%
CPI	Jyoti Basu	40,830	56.97	−2.27
INC	Dhirendra Nath Chattopadhyay	27,418	38.26	−1.24
ABJS	Kamakhya Kumar Guha	1,485	2.07	
PSP	Bijoy Ratna Sen Sharma	974	1.36	
HM	Sankar Ghosh	490	0.68	
SWA	Sannyasi Charan Nath	307	0.43	
Independent	Mohini Mohan Bandopadhyay	167	0.23	
Turnout		71,671	74.92	
Majority		13,412	18.71	
CPI hold		Swing		

=== 1957 ===
1957 West Bengal Legislative Assembly election: Baranagar
Party	Candidate	Votes	%	±%
CPI	Jyoti Basu	28,269	59.24	+3.04
INC	Kanailal Dhole	18,852	39.50	+5.15
Independent	Ramendra Kumar De	405	0.85	
Independent	Dhrubajyour Mazumder	195	0.41	
Turnout		47,721	66.68	
Majority		9,417	19.74	
CPI hold		Swing		

=== 1951 ===
1951 West Bengal Legislative Assembly election: Baranagar
Party	Candidate	Votes	%	±%
CPI	Jyoti Basu	13,968	56.20	
INC	Rai Harendra Nath Chowdhury	8,539	34.35	
Independent	Dhirendra Nath Chattopadhyay	1,524	6.13	
Socialist Party (India)	Moni Bhusan Chatterjee	281	1.13	
Independent	Hari Bhusan Chattopadhyay	257	1.03	
KMPP	Ashok Das Gupta	157	0.63	
RSP	Nikhil Das	66	0.27	
Independent	Sailendra Kumar Mukhopadhyay	64	0.26	
Turnout		24,856	43.66	
Majority		5,429	21.85	
CPI hold		Swing		
