= Purva Pradesh =

Proposed merger of Indian states

Purva Pradesh was a proposed merger of the Indian states of West Bengal and Bihar. The proposal was promoted by the States Reorganisation Commission in 1955 and led to widespread protests. It was scrapped following the enactment of the States Reorganisation Act, 1956.
