= Manch =

Manch (transl. 'Platform' in Indic languages) is an Indian political term and may refer to:

== India ==
- Manch Theatre
- Marwari Yuva Manch
- Marxist Manch
- Utkal Prantiya Marwari Yuva Manch
- Goa Suraksha Manch
- Ekta Manch
- Tripura Ganatantrik Manch
- Kabir Kala Manch
- Jan Sangharsh Manch
- Muslim Rashtriya Manch
- Rashtriya Jagran Manch
- Jana Natya Manch
- Chetna Natya Manch
- Bahujan Republican Ekta Manch
- Paschimbanga Ganatantrik Manch
- Sikkim Ekta Manch
- Rashtriya Swabhiman Manch
- Dr. Syamaprasad Jana Jagaran Manch
- All India Dalit Mahila Adhikar Manch

== Nepal ==
- Nepal Dalit Utthan Manch

== See also ==
- Mancha (disambiguation)
