= Mancha =

Mancha or La Mancha may refer to:

== Arts and Entertainment ==
- Garbancito de la Mancha, 1945 Spanish animated film
- Rocío de la Mancha, 1963 album by Rocío Dúrcal
- Rocío from La Mancha, 1963 Spanish film
- Man of La Mancha, 1965 musical based on 17th century novel Don Quixote
- L'Homme de la Mancha, 1968 album by Jacques Brel
- Man of La Mancha (film), 1972 film based on the 17th century novel Don Quixote
- La Leyenda de la Mancha, 1998 album by Mägo de Oz
- Lost in La Mancha, 2002 documentary film
- La vida mancha, 2003 Spanish drama film
- Daily Bir Chattagram Mancha, Bengali newspaper in Chittagong, Bangladesh

== People ==
- Mancha (surname)
- Don Quijote de la Mancha, fictional protagonist of Spanish 17th century novel Don Quixote
- Mancha (footballer) (born 2001), full name Gianluca Piola Minozzo, Brazilian football left-back

== Places ==
- La Mancha, historic region in Spain
- Mancha Húmeda, Spanish wetland
- La Mancha (DO), Spanish vine-growing region
- Castilla–La Mancha, autonomous community in Spain
- Castilla–La Mancha Bridge, Spanish bridge
- Mancha Real, city in Jaén, Spain
- Mancha-Centro, comarca of Albacete, Spain
- Mancha Blanca, village in Tinago, Spain
- Mancha Alta Albaceteña, comarca in province of Albacete, Spain
- Tarazona de la Mancha, municipality in Albacete, Spain
- Mancha del Júcar, comarca in province of Albacete, Spain
- Mancha Júcar-Centro, comarca in province of Albacete, Spain
- Girish Mancha, theatre in Bagbazar, India
- Sukanta Mancha, auditorium in Kolkata, India
- Nazrul Mancha, auditorium in Kolkata, India
- Sisir Mancha, auditorium in Kolkata, India
- Ramgopal Mancha, auditorium in Howrah, India
- Madhusudan Mancha, auditorium in Dhakuria, India
- Mancha Khiri District, district in Khon Kaen Province, Thailand

== Football ==
- Atlético Mancha Real, Spanish football club
- CS La Mancha, Congolese football club
- Mancha Verde, nickname for fans of Brazilian football club Palmeiras

== Other uses ==
- La Mancha Negra, mysterious substance that oozed on Venezuelan roads

== See also ==
- Manch (disambiguation)
- Manche, coastal department in Normandy, France
