= Indian Communist Party (1987) =

Political party in India

Indian Communist Party flag

The Indian Communist Party (ICP) was a political party in the Indian state of Tamil Nadu, emerging from a rift in the Communist Party of India (CPI) in 1987. The party was founded by veteran communist leader and trade unionist M. Kalyanasundaram, who died a few months after the split. The group opposed the alliance between CPI and the Dravida Munnetra Kazhagam (DMK) party. It went on to align itself with the Congress-I ahead of the 1989 Tamil Nadu Legislative Assembly election. Simultaneously with the finalization of its pre-poll alliance, the ICP merged into the Communist Party led by S.A. Dange and Mohit Sen.

== Split in Tamil Nadu CPI ==
By the mid 1980s there were political tensions within the Tamil Nadu state unit of CPI. In July 1986, the CPI National Council took disciplinary action against D. Pandian for anti-party activities, and in September 1986 against M. Kalyanasundaram. In April 1987, Pandian was suspended from the CPI National Council. Political issues that provoked tensions between the official CPI leadership and Kalyanasundaram included the Sri Lankan Tamil question and the CPI alliance with DMK; however, Kalyanasundaram and Pandian did not join the All India Communist Party of S.A. Dange (which had a similar rightist political outlook), largely due to personal incompatibilities between Kalyanasundaram and Dange.

By mid-1987, the conflict within the Tamil Nadu unit of CPI had reached a critical point. Thirty-six Kalyanasundaram loyalists boycotted a meeting of the CPI Tamil Nadu State Council. The CPI Tamil Nadu State Council meeting decided to suspend 16 State Council members linked to the Kalyanasundaram faction – Pandian, K. T. Raju (former Member of Legislative Assembly and former Assistant Secretary of the CPI Tamil Nadu unit), R. Karuppiah (former member of the Legislative Assembly and secretary of the CPI Tiruchirappalli District Committee), K. R. Subbiah (secretary of the CPI Pudukkottai District Committee), V. Madanagopal (former member of the Legislative Assembly), N. Nanjappan, K. A. Venugopal, K. Manickam, P. R. Chandran, C. K. Pattabhiraman, V. Thirumalairajan, S. V. Shanmugam, P. Vembulu, V. Rajamohan, M. S. Ramamurthy, and R. Ramasamy. Thereafter the Kalyanasundaram faction organized a two-day conclave on July 4, 1987, gathering some 280 party cadres. The Kalyanasundaram faction constituted a party committee of its own and began publishing its own party journal. The Kalyanasundaram faction meeting announced that the group would adhere to the line of the Patna CPI Party Congress, and that they only were in conflict with the Tamil Nadu CPI leadership. At the time of their July 1987 conclave, the Kalyanasundaram faction claimed to have the support of 36 CPI Tamil Nadu State Council members, 10 District Committees and 30,000 out of 47,000 CPI party members in the state.

Kalyanasundaram wrote to CPI general secretary C. Rajeswara Rao, pledging to remain in CPI and asking the national party centre to take action against the Tamil Nadu CPI unit led by P. Manickam. On 8 July 1987, the CPI Central Secretariat denounced factional activities of Kalyanasundaram as "beyond the pale" of the party. On 10 July 1987, Kalyanasundaram held a press conference, stating that there would be no split in CPI. On 31 July 1987, the CPI National Council suspended Kalyanasundaram and 16 of his followers for a one-year period. The CPI National Council instructed Kalyanasundaram to disband his parallel party committee and stop publishing his party journal within one month, and authorized the CPI Central Secretariat to expel Kalyanasundaram if he failed to comply.

On 8 September 1987, the CPI Tamil Nadu state unit expelled the 16 suspended State Council members. On 9 September 1987, Kalyanasundaram announced that his faction would work for the creation of third front in Tamil Nadu politics. Moreover, Kalyanasundaram argued that the two CPI factions would reunite shortly. He claimed to have the support of the majority of the membership of the All India Trade Union Congress (AITUC) in the state, and AITUC elections were being delayed to avoid that his faction win control over the state unit.

== Emergence of a new party ==
In early December 1987, Pandian announced that the Kalyanasundaram-led faction would be known as the "Communist Party" henceforth. Subsequently, the name "Indian Communist Party" (ICP) came into use. The ICP used a red flag with a yellow hammer and sickle as its symbol (unlike CPI, which used a white hammer and sickle on the party flag). Pandian was the Tamil Nadu state secretary of the party. Kalyanasundaram died in 1988. The party was supportive of Soviet perestroika policies. It opposed the DMK on basis of the latter's supposed support for separatism in Sri Lanka.

== Merger with AICP ==
On 21–22 December 1988, a party unity congress was held in Bombay, at which the ICP, the All India Communist Party and the All India Communist Co-ordination Committee (whose convenor was Mohit Sen) merged into a party named the Communist Party with Dange as chairman and Sen as general secretary.

== 1989 Tamil Nadu elections ==
Ahead of the 1989 Tamil Nadu Legislative Assembly election (for which voting would take place a month after the merger between ICP and AICP), ICP called for an alliance between Congress-I, AIADMK (Jayalalitha) and other parties to confront the DMK-led National Front alliance. The ICP eventually joined the Congress-I-led front. Motivating the decision to side with Congress-I, Pandian argued that the National Front was rightist and reactionary and that unity to support the Indo-Sri Lankan Accord was a necessity. ICP had demanded to contest 16 seats in the election.

Seat-sharing talks between Congress-I and ICP were finalized on December 23, 1988. Ten seats seats were allocated to ICP to contest; however, the selected ICP candidate for Sedapatti constituency could not contest, leaving nine seats for ICP candidates. Of the nine candidates running, one seat was won (N. Nanjappan in Pennagaram). The nine candidates of ICP gathered 111,654 votes in total (0.47% of the state-wide vote for all 234 constituencies).
