= Dilipkumar Gandhi =

Indian politician (1951–2021)

Member of Parliament Lok Sabha
- In office 2009–2019
- Preceded by: Tukaram Gangadhar Gadakh
- Succeeded by: Sujay Vikhe Patil
- Constituency: Ahmednagar
- In office 1999–2004
- Preceded by: Balasaheb Vikhe Patil
- Succeeded by: Tukaram Gangadhar Gadakh
- Constituency: Ahmednagar

Personal details
- Born: Dilipkumar Mansukhlal Gandhi; 9 May 1951 Daund, Maharashtra, India
- Died: 17 March 2021 (aged 69) Delhi, India
- Party: BJP
- Spouse: Saroj
- Children: 2 sons and 1 daughter

Dilipkumar Mansukhlal Gandhi (9 May 1951 – 17 March 2021) was an Indian politician and a member of the Bharatiya Janata Party political party. He was the member of the 15th Lok Sabha & 16th Lok Sabha of India.

== Political career ==
Gandhi began his political career by holding key positions in the district organisation of BJP such as General Secretary, Joint Secretary and President. He was elected to the Ahmednagar Municipal Corporation as a Councilor and later he became the Leader of the Bharatiya Janata Party in the Municipal Council. In 1985, he became the Vice-President of the Ahmednagar Municipal Corporation.

In 1999 he was elected to the 13th Lok Sabha from Ahmednagar constituency in Maharashtra state. He was Union Minister of State, Ministry of Shipping from 29 January 2003 to 15 March 2004.

In 2009, he was elected to the 15th Lok Sabha from the same constituency.

In 2014, he was re-elected with a margin of more than 200,000 votes in 2014 Indian general elections in which BJP had a huge victory across India under leadership of Narendra Modi as PM Candidate.

== Death ==
He died on 17 March 2021, from COVID-19.

== See also ==
- All India Marwari Yuva Manch
- Utkal Prantiya Marwari Yuva Manch

Lok Sabha
Preceded by Balasaheb Vikhe Patil	Member of Parliament for Ahmednagar; 1999 – 2004	Succeeded by Tukaram Gangadhar Gadakh
Preceded by Tukaram Gangadhar Gadakh	Member of Parliament for Ahmednagar; 2009 – 2019	Succeeded by Sujay Vikhe Patil
