= CICD =

CICD may refer to:

- College for International Co-operation and Development, training institute located in Hull, Yorkshire, England
- Congress for International Co-operation and Disarmament, Australian pacifist group active in opposition to the Vietnam War
- CI/CD, the combination, in software development, of continuous integration and continuous delivery

== See also ==
- Confederation of Indian Communists and Democratic Socialists (CICDS)
