= Party of Democratic Socialism (India) =

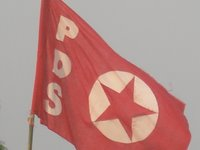
- Leader: Anuradha Putatunda
- General Secretary: Samir Putatundu
- Founder: Saifuddin Chowdhury, Samir Putatunda
- Founded: 21 February 2001
- Split from: CPI(M)
- Headquarters: 2/3A, Dr. Suresh Sarkar Road, Kolkata – 700014
- Newspaper: Natun Path
- Women's wing: Paschim Banga Nari Sanghati Samiti
- Ideology: Scientific socialism Democratic socialism Secularism
- Political position: left-wing
- Colours: Red
- ECI status: Registered Regional Party

Website
- Party of Democratic Socialism

The Party of Democratic Socialism (PDS) is a political party in West Bengal, India. The PDS was founded in February 2001 by former Communist Party of India (Marxist) leaders Saifuddin Choudhury and Samir Putatundu. The PDS was in opposition to the Left Front government in West Bengal.

== History ==
The PDS was founded by Saifuddin Chaudhury on 21 February 2001. Samir Putatunda, who had been expelled from CPI(M), joined the new party.

== Alliances ==
Initially there was speculation that the PDS would join the All India Trinamool Congress, or else that it would be a constituent of CPI(M)-led Mahajot (broad front), but the link between Trinamool and the Hindu rightist Bharatiya Janata Party hindered such a development.

The PDS has formed relations with other pro-Congress leftist outfits, such as the Communist Marxist Party in Kerala and the United Communist Party of India. PDS participates in the Confederation of Indian Communists and Democratic Socialists.

== Elections ==
Ahead of the West Bengal state assembly elections in 2001, the PDS had launched their own front. The PDS put up 98 candidates, who together got 219,082 votes (0.6% of the votes in the state). None of their candidates were elected. Ahead of the Lok Sabha elections in 2004, the PDS had joined hands with Congress, and put up two candidates supported by Congress.

== Organisation ==
The flag of the PDS is a red flag with a red star in a white circle. The president of the PDS was Saifuddin Chaudhury, the general secretary was Samir Putatundu (formerly the CPI(M) South 24 Paraganas district secretary), and the treasurer is Subir Chaudhury.

The women's organization of the PDS is called Paschim Banga Nari Sanghati Samiti (West Bengal Women's United Association). The president of PBNSS is Kishwar Jahan. The PDS publishes Natun Path (New Way).
