= Vanaja Iyengar =

Indian mathematician, educationist

- Born: Andhra Pradesh, India
- Died: 2001
- Occupations: Mathematician; Educationist
- Known for: Education
- Spouse: Mohit Sen
- Awards: Padma Shri; Government of Andhra Pradesh Best Teacher Award; Rajiv Gandhi Foundation Fellowship

Vanaja Iyengar (died 2001) was an Indian mathematician, educationist and the founder vice-chancellor of Sri Padmavati Mahila Visvavidyalayam, Tirupati, in the south Indian state of Andhra Pradesh. She was one of the founders of the Andhra Mahila Sabha School of Informatics. The Government of India awarded her the fourth highest civilian honour of Padma Shri in 1987.

== Biography ==
Born in the undivided Andhra Pradesh, she completed her early education at Hyderabad and obtained higher education in Mathematics from Cambridge University in 1950, after which she visited Yugoslavia, Czechoslovakia and Hungary as a part of student forums. Her career started as a member of faculty at Osmania University and worked in two of the colleges affiliated to the university, University College for Women, Koti (Osmania Women's College) and Nizam College.

During her tenure at Osmania, Iyengar secured a doctoral degree in mathematics from the University of Delhi in 1958. She served Osmania University as a reader, professor, head of the department of Mathematics department and the principal of the University College for Women, Koti and held the post of the vice-chancellor for a while. When Sri Padmavati Mahila Visvavidyalayam, an all women university, was established in 1983, she was appointed as its vice-chancellor and continued at the post till 1986. She was also one of the founder members of the Osmania University Teachers Association. She was a life trustee of Andhra Mahila Sabha and she served organisation as its vice-president and the president, a post she held since 1994 till her death. She is also credited with articles on the topic of education.

== Awards and recognition ==
In 1987, the Government of India awarded Iyengar the civilian honour of Padma Shri. She received the Best Teacher award from the Government of Andhra Pradesh and was a fellow of the Rajiv Gandhi Foundation. She died in 2001, survived by her husband, Mohit Sen, a known communist intellectual, who also died two years later.

== See also ==
- Mohit Sen
- Andhra Mahila Sabha
- Sri Padmavati Mahila Visvavidyalayam
