= AICP =

AICP may refer to:

- All India Communist Party
- American Institute of Certified Planners, the American Planning Association's professional institute
- Android Ice Cold Project, a custom Android distribution
- Association for Improving the Condition of the Poor, a 19th-century charitable organization in New York City
- Association of Islamic Charitable Projects, an international organization with moderate Islamic principles
- Association of Independent Commercial Producers, an American organization representing commercial media producers

== See also ==
- AICPA, American Institute of Certified Public Accountants
