= Friends of the Soviet Union (India, 1981) =

Friends of the Soviet Union was an organisation in India. It was founded by members of the Indian National Congress and the All India Communist Party as an alternative to the CPI controlled Indo-Soviet Cultural Society (ISCUS), after the break between CPI and the Congress in the national political scene.

The May 1981 inaugural conference of FSU was addressed by Indian Prime Minister Indira Gandhi. In her speech Gandhi scolded the CPI/ISCUS, calling them 'self-appointed custodians' of Indo-Soviet friendship.
