= Confederation of Indian Communists and Democratic Socialists =

Political party confederation in India

Confederation of Indian Communist and Democratic Socialists (CICDS) was a confederation of left-wing parties in India.

The constituent parties of CICDS included:

- United Communist Party of India led by Mohit Sen
- Communist Marxist Party (John) led by C. P. John
- Party of Democratic Socialism led by Saifuddin Choudhury and Samir Putatundu
- Communist Revolutionary League of India (CRLI) led by Ashim Chatterjee
- Peoples Revolutionary Party of India (Paschimbanga Ganatantrik Manch) led by Sumantha Hira
- Tripura Ganatantrik Manch led by Ajoy Biswas
- Janganotantrik Morcha
- Marxist Manch
- Orissa Communist Party led by Ajay Rout
- Krantikari Samyavadi Party based in Bihar
- Rashtravadi Communist Party based in Uttar Pradesh
- Madhya Pradesh Kisan Mazdoor Adivasi Kranti Dal
