= Mancha (surname) =

Mancha is a Spanish surname. Notable people with the surname include:

- Antonio Hernández Mancha (born 1951), Spanish former politician
- Caio Mancha (born 1992), Brazilian football forward
- David Cordón Mancha (born 2007), Spanish footballer
- Eduardo Mancha (born 1995), Brazilian football centre-back
- Gabriel Mancha (born 2002), Brazilian footballer
- Gustavo Mancha (born 2004), Brazilian footballer
- Jesús Mancha (1941–2023), Spanish politician
- Joshua Mancha (born 2004), Mexican footballer
- Rodrigo Mancha (born 1986), Brazilian football defensive midfielder
- Vaughn Mancha (1921–2011), American football player

== Fictional characters ==
- Victor Mancha, a Marvel comics superhero

== See also ==
- Mancha (disambiguation)
