= Janganotantrik Morcha =

- Founder: Ajoy Biswas
- Founded: 2001
- Ideology: Communism; Marxism-Leninism
- Political position: Left-wing
- National affiliation: Confederation of Indian Communists and Democratic Socialists

Janganotantrik Morcha (People's Democratic Front) is a political party in the Indian state of Tripura. PDF was formed by Ajoy Biswas, a former member of the Lok Sabha of Communist Party of India (Marxist) (CPI(M)). Biswas broke out of CPI(M) against ideological differences with then Chief Minister Nripen Chakraborty.

== History ==
The PDF-breakaway affected the teachers movement of CPI(M) in the state. Both teachers organizations of CPI(M), Tripura Government Teachers Association (state schools) and Tripura Teachers Association (private schools) were divided. The CPI(M) loyalists were called TGTA (H.G.B. Road) and TTA (H.G.B. Road) whereas the followers of Biswas were called TGTA (Ajoy Biswas) and TTA (Ajoy Biswas).

Biswas later broke with PDF and formed Tripura Ganatantrik Manch.

Janganotantrik Morcha participates in the Confederation of Indian Communists and Democratic Socialists.

The symbol of PDF is a red banner with a hammer and sickle (same as CPI(M)).

== See also ==
- List of political parties in India
