= Odisha Communist Party =

- Founded: ~1990s
- Ideology: Communism; Marxism-Leninism
- Political position: Left-wing
- National affiliation: Confederation of Indian Communists and Democratic Socialists

The Odisha Communist Party is a political party in the Indian state of Odisha. OCP was formed in the beginning of the 1990s as a splinter group of Communist Party of India (Marxist). The party is led by Ajeya Rout. When the split occurred the dissidents tried to capture the trade union structure of CPI(M) in the mining areas in northern Odisha. This led to violent conflict. But the OCP-ers themselves came from southern Odisha, and they were not able to convince the northern grassroots to follow them. In the end the OCP-ers had to leave the mining areas. Today OCP is more or less defunct. It has good relations with the Indian National Congress, who gave OCP an office in the state capital Bhubaneswar.

Radhakanta Sethi, who was elected to the Odisha legislative assembly as a CPI(M)-candidate, joined OCP in 1992 after a period as an independent.

OCP participates in the Confederation of Indian Communists and Democratic Socialists.
