= Rashtravadi Communist Party =

Political party in India

Rashtravadi Communist Party (Nationalist Communist Party), was a political party in Uttar Pradesh, India. RCP was floated by social worker Kaushal Kishore. It was registered with the Election Commission of India. The party was merged with the Bharatiya Janata Party in 2014.

Kishore had been expelled from Communist Party of India in 2001. He had and contested assembly elections twice for CPI but lost in 1993 and 1996 Uttar Pradesh Legislative Assembly election to Gauri Shankar of SP. In the 2002 assembly elections, Kishore contested as an independent candidate and won the Malihabad Assembly constituency defeating Gauri Shankar of Samajwadi Party by a margin of over 25,000 votes. Kishore got 62 571 votes (47.37%). Kishore had a stable backing from the Pasi community. In 2007 and 2012 Assembly elections he contested on Rashtravadi Communist Party but lost.

RCP and Kishore fights for the conditions and rights of hijras. RCP has nominated hijras in elections. In the 2002 Uttar Pradesh assembly elections Payal Kinner (registered as a female candidate) contested the Lucknow West seat. Payal got 1680 votes (1,34%).

Kishore has been inducted as a minister of state in Mulayalam Singh Yadav's cabinet in Uttar Pradesh. RCP has however developed closer relations to Indian National Congress.

Kishore stood as a candidate in Mohanlalganj in the Lok Sabha elections in 2004 obtaining 28 757 votes (5.03%).

RCP participated in the Confederation of Indian Communists and Democratic Socialists.

Before the 2014 Lok Sabha election, he merged the party with the BJP and contested the Mohanlalganj Lok Sabha constituency and won, riding on the Modi wave. He retained the seat in the 2018 Lok Sabha election.
