= Radhakanta Sethy =

Indian politician

Member: Orissa Legislative Assembly
- In office 1990–1995
- Constituency: Pattamundai

Personal details
- Born: 1960 (age 65–66)
- Party: Communist Party of India (Marxist-Leninist) Liberation
- Other political affiliations: Orissa Communist Party, Communist Party of India (Marxist)
- Profession: Politician

Radhakanta Sethy (born in 1959/1960) is an Indian politician and trade unionist.

Sethy is the son of Binakar Sethy. He obtained a Bachelor of Arts degree from Pattamundai College in 1982. He lives in Banto, Kendrapara district.

Sethy was elected to the Orissa Legislative Assembly in 1990. He stood as a Communist Party of India (Marxist) candidate in the Pattamundai seat, obtaining 35,861 votes (43.96% of the votes in the constituency). He was the sole CPI(M) candidate elected to the assembly. Sethy left the CPI(M), and on 19 September 1991 he requested to be recognised as an independent assembly member. He subsequently joined the Orissa Communist Party, and on 4 March 1992 he requested to be recognised an OCP member in the assembly.

He lost the Pattamundai seat in the 1995 Orissa Legislative Assembly election. He stood as an OCP candidate and finished in third place with 15,493 votes (14.34%). Sethy contested the 2000 Orissa Legislative Assembly election, standing as an independent candidate in Pattamundai. He finished in third place with 13,079 votes (12.88%).

Sethy joined the Communist Party of India (Marxist-Leninist) Liberation in 2002. As of 2008, he was an Orissa State Committee member of the CPI(ML) Liberation. He is also a leader of the All India Central Council of Trade Unions (AICCTU), the labour wing of CPI(ML) Liberation. The first Orissa state conference of AICCTU, held in 2008, elected Sethi as the general secretary of its Orissa unit. CPI(ML) Liberation fielded him as its candidate in the Kendrapara constituency in the 2009 Orissa Legislative Assembly election. He finished in fifth place, with 552 votes (0.47%).
