= All India Communist Party =

- Founded: 1980
- Dissolved: May 1989
- Split from: Communist Party of India
- Merged into: United Communist Party of India
- Ideology: Communism; Marxism-Leninism
- Political position: Left-wing

The All India Communist Party (AICP) was a communist party in India. It was formed after a split in the Communist Party of India in 1980, by a section of CPI cadres dissatisfied with the political changes that occurred during the 1978 Bhatinda conference of CPI. During most of the 1970s CPI had supported the government of Indira Gandhi and the Indian National Congress. But after the electoral defeat of Gandhi in 1977 CPI began to reconsider its relation to the Congress. After the Bhatinda conference CPI distanced itself from the Congress and aligned itself with the Communist Party of India (Marxist) instead, promoting left unity. The founders of AICP wanted to retain the close relationship with the Congress.

Roza Deshpande, the daughter of the founding leader of CPI S.A. Dange and her husband Bani Deshpande, played an important role in organising the founding of the new party. Dange himself was initially largely sceptical of a split in the CPI.

The first conference of AICP was held in Meerut, commencing on 13 March. Dange turned up uninvited to the Meerut conference and took charge of the new party. He was elected general secretary of the party.

As an alternative to the CPI-controlled Indo-Soviet Cultural Society (ISCUS), members of AICP and the Congress set up the Friends of the Soviet Union. But the control over FSU was completely taken over by the Congress.

Although having Dange, a historical stalwart of the communist movement in India, as its leader AICP was not able to attract any major nationwide following. According to Bhattacharya two reasons were of significance. First of all, the Soviet Union did not give any political support to the new party. The founders of AICP were upholding the pro-Soviet CPI policy of cooperating with the National Congress (which was in line with Soviet revisionism), but the Soviets were not interested in a split within CPI. Secondly, the Congress showed limited interest towards the idea of having a national alliance with the new party. In the end, the two parties would be poised against each other in several local elections.

In 1989 AICP merged with the Indian Communist Party and formed the United Communist Party of India, which would function as a continuation of the political line of AICP.
