= Roza Vidyadhar Deshpande =

Indian politician (1929–2020)

Member of parliament, Lok Sabha
- In office 25 July 1973 – 21 May 1977
- Preceded by: Ramchandra Dhondiba Bhandare
- Succeeded by: Ahilya Rangnekar
- Constituency: Mumbai Central

Personal details
- Born: 1929 Bombay, Bombay Presidency, British India
- Died: 19 September 2020 (aged 90–91) Mumbai, Maharashtra, India
- Party: Communist Party of India
- Spouse: Bani Deshpande
- Children: One Son, One Daughter
- Parent: S.A. Dange (father)

Roza Vidyadhar Deshpande (1929 – 19 September 2020) was an Indian politician of the United Communist Party of India. She was associated with All India Communist Party during 1980 to 1987 and with Communist Party of India earlier.

== Family background and education ==
She was the daughter of Shripad Amrit Dange, a founding member of the CPI and a stalwart of the Indian trade union movement. Her mother was Ushabai Dange, popularly known as Ushatai, a communist trade union leader. She wrote the first biography on her father.

She was married to communist leader Vidyadhar Laxman Deshpande alias Bani Deshpande.

== Political career ==
She was a member of the 5th Lok Sabha from Bombay Central constituency as a CPI candidate.

Deshpande took part in the Samyukta Maharashtra movement (the movement for the creation of the state of Maharashtra) and the Goa liberation struggle as a member of the All India Students Federation.

== Death ==
Roza Deshpande died on 19 September 2020 at her residence in Mumbai. She was then 91 years old.
