= Peoples Revolutionary Party of India =

Indian political party

People's Revolutionary Party of India is a splinter group of Communist Party of India (Marxist) in West Bengal. The party was previously known as Paschimbanga Ganatantrik Manch.

The leader of Peoples Revolutionary Party of India is Sumantha Hira.

PRPI participates in the Confederation of Indian Communists and Democratic Socialists.
