= Shripad Amrit Dange =

Indian communist politician(10 October 1899 – 22 May 1991)

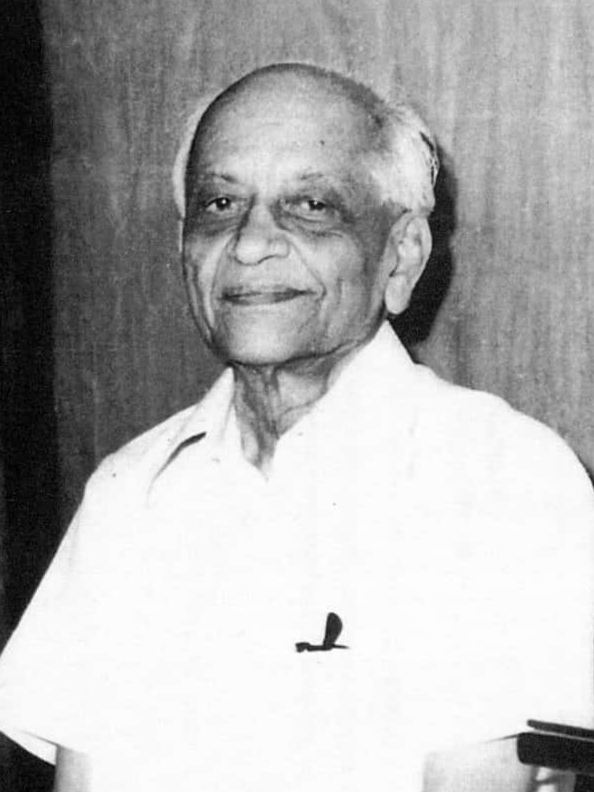

Chairman of the Communist Party of India
- In office 25 February 1962 – 28 November 1981
- Preceded by: Position established
- Succeeded by: Position abolished

Member of Parliament, Lok Sabha
- In office 5 Apr 1967 – 5 April 1977
- Preceded by: Vithal Balkrishna Gandhi
- Succeeded by: Abdul Kader Salebhoy
- Constituency: Bombay Central South
- In office 5 Apr 1957 – 31 March 1962
- Preceded by: Jayashri Naishadh Raiji
- Succeeded by: Vithal Balkrishna Gandhi
- Constituency: Bombay City Central

President, Samyukta Maharashtra Samiti
- In office 1959–1960
- Preceded by: Position established
- Succeeded by: Position abolished

Personal details
- Born: 10 October 1899 Karanjgaon, Bombay Presidency, British India
- Died: 22 May 1991 (aged 91) Bombay, Maharashtra, India
- Party: Communist Party of India
- Spouse: Ushatai Dange
- Children: Roza Vidyadhar Deshpande Shaila Shripad Dange
- Awards: Order of Lenin

Shripad Amrit Dange (10 October 1899 – 22 May 1991) was an Indian politician who was a founding member of the Communist Party of India (CPI) and a stalwart of Indian trade union movement. During the 20th century, Dange was arrested by the authorities for communist and trade union activities and was jailed for an overall period of 13 years. His early years were marked by the Kanpur Bolshevik Conspiracy Trial, and later by internal controversy over alleged 1924 letters in which he sought leniency from the British colonial administration.

After India's Independence, a series of events like Sino-Soviet split, Sino-Indian war, and dispute over the stand of the party towards Indian National Congress led to a split in the Communist Party of India, in 1964. The breakaway Communist Party of India (Marxist) (CPI(M)) emerged stronger both in terms of membership and their performance in the Indian Elections. Dange, who remained the Chairman of the CPI till 1978, was removed in that year because the majority of party workers were against Dange's political line of supporting Indian National Congress, and Indira Gandhi, the then Congress Prime Minister. He was expelled from the CPI in 1981. He joined the All India Communist Party (AICP), and later, United Communist Party of India. Towards the end, Dange got increasingly marginalised in the Indian Communist movement. He was also a well-known writer and was the founder of Socialist, the first socialist weekly in India. Dange played an important role in the formation of Maharashtra state.

== Early years ==
Shripad Amritpant Dange was born in Marathi Deshastha Yajurvedi Brahman family in 1899, in the village of Karanjgaon in Niphad Taluka of Nashik District, Maharashtra. His father worked in Mumbai as government officer and was a major landowner of the area and lived in a palace-like house in Karanjgaon. Dange was sent to study in Pune. He was expelled from college for organising a movement against compulsory teaching of the Bible. While in work, Dange was exposed to conditions of workers when he undertook voluntary work in the textile mill areas of Mumbai. Dange was drawn into active politics by the fervour of nationalist movement against the British rule in India. Bal Gangadhar Tilak, a veteran leader of Indian National Congress from Maharashtra, the earliest proponent of swaraj (complete independence) greatly inspired young Dange. Later, when Mahatma Gandhi launched the Non-Cooperation Movement in 1920, Dange gave up his studies and joined the Independence movement.

He became interested in Marxism, while following the Russian Revolution of 1917. He grew increasingly skeptical about Gandhism, especially about Gandhi's promotion of cottage industries as the sole solution for India's economic ills, while overlooking possibilities of an industrial economy.

=== 1924 Cawnpore Letters ===
In May 1924, while imprisoned in Cawnpore (Kanpur) under charges related to the Bolshevik Conspiracy Case, Shripad Amrit Dange submitted a letter to the District Magistrate of Cawnpore requesting a transfer to Bombay or Poona Jail. In his appeal, Dange cited poor health, difficulty communicating in the local language, and the inability of his family to afford visits from Bombay.

A subsequent joint letter dated 28 May 1924, signed by Dange and Nalini Bhushan Das Gupta, expressed willingness to give an undertaking to the colonial government "not to commit any more offences" and requested early release, stating that they were "undergoing suffering which we cannot sustain".

The letters, later rediscovered and published in 1964, provoked considerable controversy within the Communist Party of India. The CPI Secretariat dismissed them as forgeries, whereas critics within the party, particularly those aligned with the left wing, cited them as evidence of early accommodation with the British colonial government.

Some historians and political commentators interpret these petitions as indicative of Dange's conciliatory posture toward colonial authority, contrasting it with the defiance displayed by contemporary nationalist prisoners.

=== Gandhi Vs. Lenin ===
In 1921, Dange published a pamphlet titled Gandhi Vs. Lenin, a comparative study of approaches of both the leaders; but, Lenin coming out as better of the two. This work proved to be a turning point in Dange's life. Prominent Marxist leader M. N. Roy read the work and went on to meet its young author, when he came to Mumbai. Ranchoddas Bhavan Lotvala, a flour mill owner from Mumbai who 'concerned himself for radical causes', also read this treatise and was impressed by its contents. Lotvala sponsored Dange's study of Marxism for several years, and together they built up a library of Marxist Literature and published translations of classics.

In 1922, with Lotvala's help, Dange launched the English weekly, Socialist, the first Indian Marxist journal. Later Mohit Sen, Dange's contemporary and a well-known communist intellectual, wrote that Dange's articles in the Socialist impressed Lenin himself.

=== Influence of Bolshevik Revolution ===
The third decade of the 20th century proved to be formative years for young Dange. The period also witnessed worldwide economic crises. There were long strikes in the industrialized world, especially in Britain. In India, the working class movement gained steady momentum during this period. It was during one of the long textile mill strikes that Dange got himself acquainted with the conditions of labourers.

The period also coincided with influence of Bolshevist ideas, following the Russian Revolution of 1917, manifesting in political events in countries outside Russia. This process was quickened by the establishment of the Third International or the Communist International, or in popular parlance—its abbreviated form – Comintern, an international communist organisation founded in Moscow in March 1919. As a resolution adopted in the Founding Congress of the Comintern its stated objective was to fight 'by all available means, including armed force, for the overthrow of the international bourgeoisie and for the creation of an international Soviet republic as a transition stage to the complete abolition of the State'.

=== Meeting with M. N. Roy ===
M. N. Roy, an ex-member of the Anushilan Samiti, perhaps the most important secret revolutionary organisation operating in East Bengal in the opening years of the 20th century, went to Moscow in by the end of April 1920. The new Russian government under Lenin evinced interest in him and encouraged him to form an Indian Communist Party. Roy went on to found the émigré Communist Party of India on 17 October 1920 in Tashkent. On his return to India, M.N. Roy who had read Gandhi Vs. Lenin met Dange in 1922. Dange at that time was closely associating with Lotvala to spread Marxian ideas. It was during this period that Dange grew in prominence as a Marxist; a sure way those days to invite antagonism from the British Government.

== Foundation of the Communist Party of India ==
The British Empire saw the founding of Comintern as a disruptive force that would cause internal disorder. It viewed the nascent leftism in India with great suspicion. During the 1920s, the Government foisted a series of 'conspiracy cases' against persons whom they suspected to have communist leanings.

=== Dange in the eyes of the British authorities ===
During this period M.N. Roy, the spokesperson of the Comintern, was seen as the most dangerous of Indian communists. During that time all the letters written by Roy from Moscow to Dange were intercepted and delivered.

The British government initially did not think Dange was dangerous.

In 1923, they came to the conclusion that they did not have enough to prove anti-government activity as "Dange is a pure doctrinaire and nothing here seen of him indicate any real power of organisation." The Government of India soon changed its mind and the file notes that 'The evidence collected clearly shows that Dange has been an important figure in the conspiracy as constant reference to his name would be unavoidable in any event in the prosecution to be instituted against other members of the conspiracy at [Allahabad].

The conspiracy referred to here is the Kanpur Conspiracy Case that would catapult Dange to a leader with national prominence.

=== Ideological controversies ===
Dange's political career was often marked by ideological controversy and differences with mainstream nationalist leaders. A key episode concerns the Quit India Movement of 1942. As a senior member of the Communist Party of India (CPI), Dange and his party opposed Mahatma Gandhi’s call for British withdrawal from India. Following the change in the Communist International (Comintern) line after the German invasion of the Soviet Union, the CPI declared World War II to be a "People’s War" and supported the Allied cause. Dange defended this position, arguing that cooperation with the British war effort was necessary to defeat fascism. This stance brought the CPI into sharp conflict with the Indian National Congress and other freedom fighters, many of whom regarded it as collaboration with the colonial administration.

Another episode relates to a letter Dange wrote to the British authorities in 1924 during his imprisonment following the Kanpur Bolshevik Conspiracy Case. In this letter, he is reported to have sought clemency from the colonial government, expressing regret for his earlier revolutionary activities. The letter has been cited by critics as evidence of Dange’s conciliatory stance toward the colonial establishment, though his supporters have argued that it reflected tactical pragmatism during a period of severe repression.

=== Kanpur Bolshevik conspiracy case ===
On 17 March 1924, M. N. Roy, S.A. Dange, Muzaffar Ahmed, Nalini Gupta, Shaukat Usmani, Singaravelu Chettiar, Ghulam Hussain and others were charged, in what was called the Cawnpore (now spelt Kanpur) Bolshevik Conspiracy case. The specific charge was that they as communists were seeking "to deprive the King Emperor of his sovereignty of British India, by complete separation of India from Britain by a violent revolution."

The case attracted interest of the people towards Comintern plan to bring about violent revolution in India. Communist trials had taken place in India, in frontier towns like Peshawar where Russian trained muhajir communists were put on trial. "But no case had attracted public gaze like the Kanpur case. Pages of newspapers daily splashed sensational communist plans and people for the first time learned such a large scale about communism and its doctrines and the aims of the Communist International in India."

Singaravelu Chettiar was released on account of illness. M.N. Roy was out of the country and therefore could not be arrested. Ghulam Hussain confessed that he had received money from the Russians in Kabul and was pardoned. Muzaffar Ahmed, Nalini Gupta, Shaukat Usmani and Dange were sentenced for various terms of imprisonment. This case was responsible for actively introducing communism to the Indian masses. Dange was released from prison in 1925.

=== Formation of the Communist Party of India ===
The industrial town of Kanpur, in December 1925, witnessed a conference of different communist groups, under the chairmanship of Singaravelu Chettiar. Dange, Muzaffar Ahmed, Nalini Gupta, Shaukat Usmani were among the key organisers of the meeting. The meeting adopted a resolution for the formation of the Communist Party of India with its headquarters in Bombay. The British Government's extreme hostility towards communists, made them to decide not to openly function as a communist party; instead, they chose a more open and non-federated platform, under the name the Workers and Peasants Parties.

== Initial years of labour movement in India ==
In 1920 the All India Trade Union Congress (AITUC) was formed at Mumbai by N.M. Joshi and others. Joshi was a philanthropist who was sympathetic to the workers'cause. At that time AITUC did not have a cohesive ideology, but it was sympathetic to the Indian National Congress. When Dange wrote about the founding session of AITUC at Mumbai, he brought out the organisation's Congress roots:

The AITUC was guided principally by the Congress leaders. The masses at this period were being led by Lokmanya Tilak and his group, in which Lala Lajpat Rai from Punjab, Bepinchandra Pal from Bengal and others had a big place. Mahatma Gandhi had refused to sponsor the idea of founding the AITUC and so he did not attend.

Communists were also largely excluded when, again in Mumbai, in 1923, jobbers and mill clerks came together and started Girni Kamgar Mahamandal (Great Association of Mill-Workers). They participated in the long textile strike in 1924.

=== Girni Kamgar Union ===
The early trade union movement in India was not directly inspired by communists. Dange played an important role in bringing the labour activists amongst Bombay textile workers under the communist umbrella. Girni Kamgar Mahamandal was split and the communists formed their own union, the Girni Kamgar Union during the general strike of 1928.

The linkages which were forged in this strike placed the communists firmly in control of the Girni Kamgar Mahamandal and enabled them to dominate trade union movement. They were now forced to confront problems forced by the structure of industrial relations. The initiative taken by the communist leadership in reflecting working class-militancy enabled them to establish their presence at the level of industry as a whole. To consolidate this position it was imperative that the Girni Kamgar Union as it is now called to penetrate the level of the individual mill...On 30 October 1928 the Girni Kamgar Union had a membership of 324; by the end of that they boasted 54000 members.

Two long and bitter strikes in 1928 and 1929 involving the members of Girni Kamgar Union followed. Dange was the general secretary of the Girni Kamgar Union. For their role in the strikes he was arrested along with Muzaffar Ahmed and Shaukat Usmani.

Dange edited the Marathi journal, Kranti, the official organ of the Girni Kamgar Union from the time of its inception.

=== Comintern's involvement ===
Believing that the world capitalism was in crisis, during the 1920s the Comintern deployed its workers to various countries. Indian communists had forged a close relationship with Communist Party of Great Britain. In 1926 and 1927 members of the British Communist Party, notably Philip Spratt and Ben Bradley, came to India. mandated by Comintern to work among the industrial labourers of Bombay and Calcutta (present spelling: Kolkata). Workers' and Peasants' Parties were started in those cities and in the United Provinces.

The communists were addressing ground level problems and as a result "N.M. Joshi, in spite of money and no persecution from the government lost the leadership (of AITUC) to the communists." The communists took over the leadership of the AITUC in December 1929, when their rivals, led by N.M.Joshi, walked out of the session, and founded a rival organisation. Like rest of the world, it was a period of great unrest in India too.

In India throughout 1928 and 1929 there was a strong wave of strikes, on the railroads, in ironworks and in the textile industry. 31 million working days lost in 1928, through industrial disputes. Trade union numbers and organisation grew rapidly during this period."

Muzaffar Ahmed, Usmani and Dange joined these later campaigns on their release from jail.

== Meerut Conspiracy Case ==
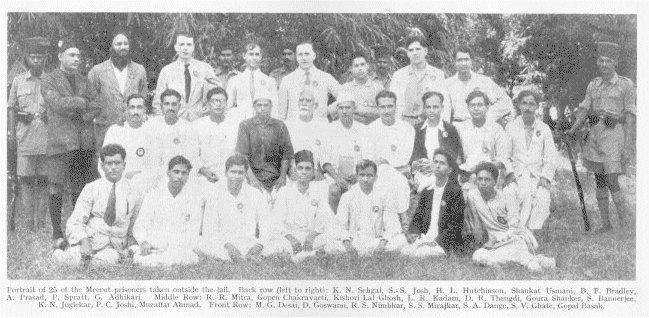
Portrait of 25 of the Meerut prisoners taken outside the jail. Back row (left to right): K. N. Sehgal, S. S. Josh, H. L. Hutchinson, Shaukat Usmani, B. F. Bradley, A. Prasad, P. Spratt, G. Adhikari. Middle row: R. R. Mitra, Gopen Chakravarti, Kishori Lal Ghosh, L. R. Kadam, D. R. Thengdi, Goura Shanker, S. Bannerjee, K. N. Joglekar, P. C. Joshi, Muzaffar Ahmad. Front row: M. G. Desai, D. Goswami, R. S. Nimbkar, S. S. Mirajkar, S. A. Dange, S. V. Ghate, Gopal Basak.

The British government was clearly worried about the growing influence of the Communist International. Its ultimate objective, so the government perceived, was to achieve "complete paralysis and overthrow of existing Governments in every country (including India) by means of a general strike and armed uprising." The government's immediate response was to foist yet another conspiracy case—the Meerut Conspiracy Case.

In more than one way the Meerut Conspiracy case trial helped the Communist Party of India to consolidate its position among workers. Dange along with 32 persons were arrested on or about 20 March 1929 and were put on trial under Section 121A of the Indian Penal Code, which declares,

Whoever within or without British India conspires to commit any of the offenses punishable by Section 121 or to deprive the King of the sovereignty of British India or any part thereof, or conspires to overawe, by means of criminal force or the show of criminal force, the Government of India or any local Government, shall be punished with transportation for life, or any shorter term, or with imprisonment of either description which may extend to ten years.

=== The charges ===
The main charges were that in 1921 Dange, Shaukat Usmani and Muzaffar Ahmad entered into a conspiracy to establish a branch of Comintern in India and they were helped by various persons, including the accused Philip Spratt and Benjamin Francis Bradley, sent to India by the Communist International. The aim of the accused persons, according to the charges raised against them was

to deprive the King Emperor of the sovereignty of British India, and for such purpose to use the methods and carry out the programme and plan of campaign outlined and ordained by the Communist International.

The Sessions Court in Meerut awarded stringent sentences to the accused in January 1933. Out of the accused 27 persons were convicted with various durations of 'transportation'. While Muzaffar Ahmed was transported for life, Dange, Spratt, Ghate, Joglekar and Nimbkar were each awarded transportation for a period of 12 years. On appeal, in July 1933, the sentences of Ahmed, Dange and Usmani were reduced three years. Reductions were also made in the sentences of other convicts.

=== Impact of Meerut Conspiracy Case ===
Though all the accused were not communists, the charges framed against them betrayed the British government's fear for growth of communist ideas in India. In the trial the accused were all labeled as Bolsheviks. During the trial of four and a half years, the defendants turned the courtroom into a public platform to espouse their cause. As a result, the trial saw strengthening of the communist movement in the country. Harkishan Singh Surjeet, a former General Secretary of the Communist Party of India (Marxist) wrote about the aftermath of the Meerut Conspiracy case thus:

a Party with a centralised apparatus, came into being only after the release of the Meerut prisoners, in 1933. The Meerut Conspiracy Case, though launched to suppress the communist movement, provided the opportunity for Communists to propagate their ideas. It came out with its own manifesto and was affiliated to the Communist International in 1934.

== The CPI and the independence movement ==
During India's freedom struggle, the Communist Party of India (CPI) frequently adopted positions that diverged from the mainstream nationalist movement. From its inception, the CPI's strategic outlook was shaped by the directives of the Communist International (Comintern), headquartered in Moscow, which influenced its interpretation of colonialism and revolution in India. After its admission to the Third International, the Communist Party of India was seen to be guided by the policies imposed by Joseph Stalin on the international communist movement. Stalin's policies were, in turn, dictated by Russia's geopolitical interests. As a result the positions taken by the CPI ran many times counter to popular nationalist sentiments, leading to erosion of the Party's popular base.

Up to 1934, the CPI viewed India's freedom struggle as a movement of the reactionary bourgeoisie politicians. The British government had banned communist activities from 1934 to 1938. When the Comintern adopted the Georgi Dimitrov thesis of popular front against fascism, CPI declared support for the Congress in 1938. The communist leaders like Dinkar Mehta, Sajjad Zaheer, E.M.S. Namboodiripad, and Soli Batliwala became members of the national executive of the Congress Socialist Party.

The Raj re-banned the CPI in 1939, for its initial anti-War stance. The line was changed when, following the Molotov-Ribbentrop Pact. The Communist Party of India did not take an active stance against Adolf Hitler and his policies. But when Hitler attacked Poland, the Communist Party of India had called World War II, an 'Imperialist War'. But when he attacked the Soviet Union, the same Communist Party of India decided to call the war, a people's war in defence of socialism, urging cooperation with the British Raj and the Allied cause.

After the USSR had sided with the Great Britain in the war, the Communist Party of India was legalised for the first time. Saying that the freedom struggle would impede the war against fascism, the CPI stayed away from the freedom struggle. When Mahatma Gandhi launched the Quit India Movement in August 1942, calling for the immediate withdrawal of British authority, the CPI opposed the campaign, arguing that such a revolt would weaken the anti-fascist war effort and disrupt industrial production. Communist cadres were instructed to maintain labour discipline in factories producing for the Allied war effort, and the party functioned legally under British permission even as most nationalist organisations were banned.

This ideological divergence left a deep imprint on India's political history. Many nationalist leaders, including those of the Indian National Congress and the Hindu Mahasabha, viewed the CPI’s wartime conduct as a departure from the civilisational and moral imperative of swarājya (self-rule). Even after independence, the CPI’s alignment with foreign ideological centres rather than the indigenous national ethos continued to influence perceptions of its role in India's political evolution.

=== Dange in "P. C. Joshi era" ===
After the sudden arrest of then Somnath Lahiri, Secretary of CPI, during end-1935, Puran Chand Joshi became the first general secretary of Communist Party of India, for a period from 1935 to 1947—or as it was called the "P. C. Joshi era".

In 1943, Dange for the first was elected to the Central Committee of the CPI. In October 1944 he attended the XVII Congress of the Communist Party of Great Britain in London as a fraternal representative from the Communist Party of India. Between 1929 and 1935, Dange remained in jail for role in Meerut conspiracy case. After being released from jail in 1935, Dange went on a speaking tour in Andhra Pradesh on the invitation of the Congress Socialist Party leadership from there. His tour resulted in that many prominent Congress Socialist Party leaders from Andhra Pradesh joining the Communist Party. After he came out of the jail, up to 1939, he was working for the Party and was trying increase its hold over the trade union movement.

Around this time Dange's legislative career also took off. He was elected to the Bombay Legislative Assembly as Communist candidate in 1946.

=== Dange's rise in trade union movement ===
In 1939, Dange was convicted to four months of rigorous imprisonment for organising a strike of textile workers. He was arrested on 11 March 1940 for leading a general strike of textile workers in Bombay and interned in the Deoli Detention Camp. At Deoli, several other communist leaders were also jailed along with him. In prison he started a political study circle among the prisoners. He was released in 1943.

Even before the takeover of the AITUC by the communists, in 1927, Dange was elected Assistant Secretary of AITUC." During the year 1943– 1944 Dange was elected for the first time as the chairman of the All India Trade Unions Congress.

In 1944–1945, he was a delegate to the World Trade Union Conference in London. In 1945–1947 he became the vice chairman of the All India Trade Union Congress. Also in October 1945 he became a member of the Executive Committee and chairman of the General Council of the World Federation of Trade Unions. In February 1947, Dange again became the chairman of All India Trade Union Congress and continued to be at the helm of that organisation either as general secretary or chairman.

== CPI on the eve of independence ==
At the time of independence, the CPI's disassociation with the Quit India movement meant it lost popularity.

ni, the then General Secretary, secured Dange's entry arranged.for

=== Dange in Moscow ===
On 15 August 1947 Dange was in Moscow in conversation with soviet theorists, Andrei Zhdanov and Mikhail Suslov.

The following exchange between Dange and Zhdanov took place on the day after the India's Independence day, on 16 August 1947:

Further com. Zhdanov asks com. Dange to explain why the Congress managed to strengthen its authority.

Comrade Dange opines that during the war the Congress, taking into account the anti-English sentiments of the wide masses, opposed the English and by this action acquired a semblance of a national organisation fighting for the national sovereignty.

The Communist Party during the war supported the allies, including the English and by this action weakened its influence as a lot of people could not correctly understand the position of the Party. A considerable part of the supporters of the Communist Party during the war shifted to the Congress.

The Soviet leaders asked Dange about the Congress. The following portion shows Dange's attitude towards the Congress and Muslim League, at that time.

Com. Zhdanov: What is Nehru – a capitalist or a landowner?

Com. Dange: A bourgeois.

Com. Zhdanov: And Jinnah?

Com. Dange: Also a bourgeois. He is an eminent advocate, has acquired a lot of money and has invested it in enterprises. Nehru also belongs to a family of eminent advocates and has invested his substantial savings in the Indian company of Tata.... .

== The 1950s: internal strifes within the CPI ==
Around the time of independence the CPI was sending confusing signals—from left to centrist to right. General Secretary Joshi was advocating unity with the Indian National Congress under the leadership of Jawaharlal Nehru. By the end of 1947, P.C. Joshi found himself in the minority. His line was challenged by the radicals who claimed that "ye azaadi jhoota hai". B.T. Ranadive, a prominent radical leader, was inspired by the great strides that the Chinese communists had made, and wanted a similar model for India.

The Communist Party of India's second congress at Calcutta (new spelling Kolkata) on 28 February 1948, the Zhdanov line of insurrection was adopted on the premise that 'free' India was only a "semi-colony of British imperialism". Joshi, who stood collaboration with Congress was sidelined, and Ranadive became the General Secretary. Open call for taking up arms, known as 'Calcutta thesis' and was closely identified with its main proponent and the new General Secretary, Ranadive. As a result insurgencies took place in Tripura, Telangana and Travancore.

A rebellion in the Telangana region in the northern part of what was to become Andhra Pradesh, a peasant struggle against the feudal regime of the Nizam was already happening when Calcutta thesis was adopted. To use the Telangana Rebellion to herald in the Indian revolution was one of the main pillars of Ranadive strategy. During the peak of Telangana rebellion, 3,000 villages and some 41,000 square kilometers of territory were involved in the revolt. The ruler of Hyderabad state, nizam had not yet acceded his territory to India, but the violence of the communist-led rebellion, the central government sent in the army in September 1948. By November 1949, Hyderabad had been forced to accede to the Indian union, and, by October 1951, the violent phase of the Telangana movement had been suppressed.

Dange had been a member of the CPI Central Committee since the founding of the Party. But during 1950–1951 he was not included in the Central Committee.

=== Stalin's intervention ===
At the start of the 1950s, the CPI was bitterly divided over the manner in which political power in India should be captured. The militants advocated the 'Chinese path', or capture of power through violent means and the other group that included Dange was for the 'Indian path'(a moderate strategy to capture power within the constraints of Indian Constitution.

The proponents of the 'Chinese path' led by C. Rajeswara Rao and those of the 'Indian path' led by Ajoy Ghosh had set up their own centres and the CPI was on the verge of a split.

On 30 May 1950, the extremists with hundreds of their followers split from the Party and came out in the open. When the war of attrition between both continued unabated, the Soviet Communists intervened. The warring leaders were invited to Russia for a discussion with the Communist Party of the Soviet Union (CPSU) in 1951.

Events that followed were described Mohit Sen thus:

Four leaders, two from each centre, were brought to Moscow. They travelled in cognito as manual workers in a Soviet ship from Calcutta. They were Ajoy Ghosh and S. A. Dange from the 'Indian Path', and C. Rajeswara Rao and Makineni Basavapunnaiah, from the Chinese path.

S. A. Dange and C. Rajeswara Rao have both told me about the meeting with the leaders of the CPSU. The first meeting was attended from the Soviet side by Comrades Suslov, Malenkov and Molotov. It was on the third day that it was announced that Comrade Stalin would attend. So he did for subsequent days....

Stalin's view also was that India was not an independent country but ruled indirectly by British colonialists. He also agreed that the Communists could eventually advance only by heading an armed revolution. But this would not be of the Chinese type. He strongly advised that the armed struggle being conducted in Telangana should be ended.

In 1951, Dange was elected to both the Central Committee and the Politburo. In 1952 Dange lost elections to the Indian Parliament from Bombay.

=== Visit of Bulganin and Khrushchev to India ===
In mid-1955, Jawaharlal Nehru, the then Indian Prime Minister visited USSR and received a tremendous welcome. This was followed by the maiden visit to India of the Soviet leaders, Nikolai Bulganin and Nikita Khrushchev in 1955. Jawaharlal Nehru, frankly put forward to the visiting Soviet leaders that the Communist Party of India was claiming to receive direction from the CPSU.

To this Khrushchev's response was a reiteration of the official Soviet Party line, that with the abolition of the Comintern, there was no organisation for leading the Communist Parties in other countries. Khrushchev and Bulganin's visit paved way for forging of a strong relationship between the Government of India (and later Congress Party) and the USSR, independent of CPI.

=== Further dissensions ===
The party was again on the verge of split at its fourth congress held at Palakkad in 1956. Against the ultra-left line of Ranadive, Dange and P.C. Joshi were for reviving the 'popular front' and working with the ruling Indian National Congress. These differences within the Communist Party of India, up to Palakkad congress was an internal matter of the Party; the international communist movement at that time was united. Ranadive who was earlier shunned for his extremism made a comeback to the Party leadership at the Palakkad congress.

== Formation of Maharashtra ==
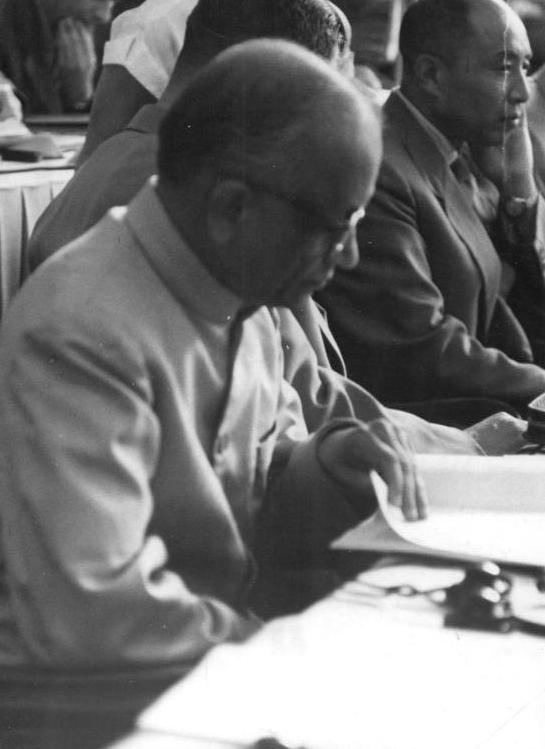
Shripad Amrit Dange representing the CPI at the fifth congress of the Socialist Unity Party of Germany, Berlin. 12 July 1958.

After India's independence in 1947, the princely states were integrated into the Indian Union, and the Deccan States including Kolhapur were integrated into Bombay State, which was created from the former Bombay Presidency in 1950. The Government of India had appointed the States Re-organisation Committee for setting up states on the basis of language. This committee recommended a bi-lingual state called Bombay for Maharashtra-Gujarat, with Bombay as its capital. The state came into being on 1 November 1956, but stirred up political unrest in both the states. In Maharashtra, under the leadership of Keshavrao Jedhe, an all-party meeting was held in Pune and a joint Maharashtra council (Samyukta Maharashtra Samiti) was founded. In the second general elections the Samiti defeated the stalwarts of Congress by securing 101 seats out of 133, including 12 from Mumbai.

Dange was elected to the 2nd Lok Sabha in 1957 from Bombay City (Central) Constituency of the State of Bombay.

Dange along with S.M. Joshi, N.G. Gore and P.K. Atre fought relentlessly for Samyukta Maharashtra, a struggle that cost a lot of lives. Finally on 1 May 1960, pre-dominantly Marathi-speaking state of Maharashtra was born.

Dange was later elected to the 4th Lok Sabha in 1967 from Bombay Central South Constituency of the Maharashtra State.

== Sino-Indian border dispute ==
Dange was the leader of the Communist group in the House of the People (Lok Sabha), when the Sino-Indian border dispute broke out—an event that would sharpen the differences within the CPI. The Calcutta Congress at the end of September 1959 brought into open the differences within the Party. As Manchester Guardian reported:

Half the party wants to express its support for the Congress stand that there will be no gift (to China) of the and that India stands broadly by the McMahon line. The other half wants to go back to guerrilla tactics and give up the parliamentary experiment. The nationalist parliamentary wing of the CP, led by Ajoy Ghosh, believes that the time for violence has not come and that Moscow counsels patience.... The other half of the ICP (sic), fed up with the parliamentary experiment, argues that Kerala proved that the ruling class will never allow a people's Government to capture power democratically. This is the first time that the ICP has been so divided, and that the division has become so public.

=== International Socialists vs. Nationalists ===
Sino-Indian border dispute brought into open bitter internal war within the CPI between those who described themselves as international socialists and others who advocated that national sentiments should not be completely ignored. Mr. Dange, leader of the Party in Parliament, M. N. Govindan Nair, secretary of the Kerala unit, and Dr. Muzaffar Ahmed of Uttar Pradesh were the proponents of the nationalist cause.

The conflict came in the open when P. C. Joshi, who controlled the Party's weekly New Age, suppressed Mr. Dange's statement in Parliament that he sharply stood by the McMahon line, and also a resolution passed by Maharashtra State Committee supporting Prime Minister Jawaharlal Nehru on the border dispute. Joshi was earlier sidelined for his pro-Congress advocacy, but later rehabilitated by making him the editor of the Party journal.

=== Initial advantage with Dange ===
An important leader publicly to join the nationalist Dange faction was A. K. Gopalan, the deputy leader of the Communist group in Lok Sabha. He was quoted by a newspaper that he (Gopalan) was shocked by the 'Ladakh incident', lamenting the loss of Indian lives, and stating that the country would support Nehru in his efforts to avoid any repetition of it.

In the initial stages, Dange's nationalist line was the dominant one. To quote Manchester Guardian, "Hence not only the Party's extremists of the Joshi wing, but also the middle-of-the-road Moscow faction were at that time visibly losing ground. This favourable development was probably accelerated by the attitude of studied neutrality adopted in Moscow, where the Soviet press printed both the Chinese and Indian accounts of the Ladakh skirmish, without appearing to take sides. His general nationalist communist position had the backing of the Kerala, Maharashtra, Andhra Pradesh, Rajasthan, Bihar, and Uttar Pradesh units of the party.

=== Dange losing ground ===
But soon after opposition against Dange erupted in the Party when Dange came up with his own definition of communist internationalism, different from standard Marxian understanding of the term. In his view internationalism is valid only for 'domestic' issues such as Hungary and Tibet, which were the 'domestic' affairs of the USSR and China. But he regards relations between India and China as non-domestic, so that Indian communists may side with the Indian government in this specific cases. Even the comrades who sided with Dange on the Sino-Indian border issue, were not ready to compromise on basic tenets of communism. Dange was severely criticised and he had own up his fault in the Party forum, through a process called 'self-criticism'.

There was also a consolidation among the communist internationalists at this stage. The Swiss paper Neue Zürcher Zeitung identified B. T. Ranadive, a former general secretary(1948–50), as supporting P.C. Joshi in his pro-Chinese attitude. According to these two militants, Nehru ought to be condemned by the Party as a "reactionary", and the policy of Congress should be resolutely opposed. At this stage, the secretariat's eight members were divided as follows:

- Dange, Gopalan, Ahmad – nationalist communists
- Joshi, Ranadive – extremists, pro-China
- Bhupesh Gupta – former extremist, present views uncertain.
- Ajoy Ghosh and one other not identified by the newspaper(probably Basavapunnaiah ) – centralists, attempting to restore unity.

== Sino-Indian War ==
In the meanwhile fighting began on the Himalayan border on 10 October 1962 between the Chinese People's Liberation Army and Army of India. The war ended when the Chinese unilaterally declared a ceasefire on 20 November 1962, which went into effect at midnight.

=== Sino-Soviet differences ===
Another issue that fueled the split in the Communist Party of India was parting of the ways between the USSR and China. Though the conflict had a long history, it came out in open in 1959, Khrushchev sought to appease the West during a period of the Cold War known as 'The Thaw', by holding a summit meeting with US President Dwight Eisenhower. Two other reasons were USSR's unwillingness to support Chinese nuclear program and their neutrality in the initial days of Sino-Indian border conflict. These events greatly offended Mao Zedong and the other Chinese Communist leaders.

=== Left vs. Right ===
In 1962, Mao criticized Khrushchev for backing down in the Cuban Missile Crisis. By that time the Soviets were openly supporting India in its border dispute with China. These events were followed by formal statements of each side's ideological positions: the Chinese came out with their document in June 1963. The Soviets too came out with their own document. Thereafter the two parties stopped communicating.

==== Chairman Dange ====
These events had their direct fall-out in the Communist Party of India. Former nationalist vs. international socialist debate had now turned into a conflict between the Right (the Russian line) and the Left (the Chinese line). Dange, who was supporting the Nehru Government, was the main leader of the Right. After the death of Secretary-General Ajoy Ghosh in January 1962, a truce was established. Dange, who at that time was the head of the All-India Trade Union Congress, became the first chairman of the CPI and the centrist leader, Namboodiripad, became the Secretary-General.

== Split in the CPI ==
At that time, the Government of India had arrested 400 prominent communist leaders of the Left wing for their alleged pro-China views. Dange, seized this opportunity, a move that would further erode his base, to reassert the right-wing control over the pro-left strongholds of West Bengal and the Punjab. In February 1963—with 48 of its 110 members absent, in detention or in hiding—the National Council voted to "administer the work of the West Bengal Party" through a Provincial Organising Committee acting on behalf of the Central Secretariat.

Through such partisan measures Dange alienated the centrist leader, E. M. S. Namboodiripad, who resigned from the post of Secretary-General, leaving Dange to take over the post. By earlier 1963 the Left had established an underground organisation for what amounted to a breakaway West Bengal Communist Party Unit. According to prominent leftist fortnightly Link, New Delhi, the new outfit enjoyed the support of 14,000 of the 17,000 Communist Party members in the state. Similar moves were made in many other states by the left-wing. Release of their leaders from jails by the state governments also helped the leftists to consolidate their position among cadres.

In September 1963, A. K. Gopalan (formerly with Dange in 1959) was able to organise an impressive anti-official party rally in Calcutta. Dange still had a majority of two-to-one on the council, but the emerging alliance between the Leftists and Namboodiripad's smaller Centrist faction forced him to be cautious. However, at that stage, with secessionist organisations already at work in several states, no caution or concession could halt the drift towards a split; though attempts were still not given up for unity. Suddenly in March 1964, a trigger was provided by what was called the 'Dange letters', that exploded on the face of the Party, precipitating a split.

== Dange letters ==
The Current, a Bombay magazine published these letters which were said to be written by Dange to the British Viceroy from prison in 1924, after his conviction in the Kanpur Conspiracy Case, and in which he had promised to cooperate with the British government. Dange, who was the chairman of the Party got the Secretariat to denounce the letters as a forgery. But slide towards split became unstoppable. His opponents exploited this opening, and called for his removal from the leadership to facilitate investigation.

=== The birth of CPI(M) ===
The cascading events following the Dange Letters ultimately resulted in the split of the Party in October, 1964. The left challenge came into the open with a conference to prepare a party program, immediately after the Dange Letters. The showdown came on 11 April 1964 when 30 Leftists and two Centrist leaders. Namboodiripad and Jyoti Basu, walked out of a National Council meeting and proceeded to appeal to all Indian Communists to repudiate the Dange leadership. National Council suspended the thirty-two leaders.

The left leaders who were ousted, in turn, announced a separated national convention. After the Tenali convention the CPI left-wing organised party district and state conferences. Also it was decided in the Tenali convention to hold a party congress of the left-wing in Calcutta. The Calcutta Congress was held during 31 October – 7 November 1964. Simultaneously, the official Party under Dange convened a Party Congress of the Communist Party of India in Bombay. The split was complete. The left group which assembled in Calcutta decided to adopt the name 'Communist Party of India (Marxist)'. This party also adopted its own political programme. P. Sundarayya was elected general secretary of CPI(M).

==== General Elections 1967 ====
After the split, the first event that tested out the relative strengths of both groups was the Kerala Assembly Elections held in 1965. The Communist Party of India contested in 79 seats but only win 3 seats, polling about 500,000 votes with 8.30% vote share. The Communist Party of India (Marxist) contested 73 seats, won 40, with about 1.3 million votes, 19.87% of the total.

In 1967, General Elections to the Parliament, Dange won from the Bombay Central South Constituency. The results had again shown a weakening CPI. They contested in 109 seats, won only 23, with about 7.5 million votes ( that is 5.11% of total votes polled. The CPI(M) contested in 59, won 19, with 6.2 million votes(4.28%).

In the state legislative elections held simultaneously, the Communist Party of India (Marxist) emerged as a major party in Kerala and West Bengal. In Kerala a United Front government led by E.M.S. Namboodiripad was formed. The Communist Party of India was a minor coalition partner. In West Bengal, Communist Party of India (Marxist) emerged as the main force, but the chief ministership of the coalition government was given to Ajoy Mukherjee of the Bangla Congress, a provincial break-away group of the Indian National Congress. For the Communist Party of India, The Kerala experiment of coexisting with Communist Party of India(Marxist) did not work for long.

=== Split in the trade union ===
Even after the party split, Communist Party of India (Marxist) and Communist Party cadres remained unified in the All India Trade Union Congress. After the short-lived coexistence between both the parties broke down in Kerala and also in West Bengal similar rupture happened, the trade union wing also split. In December 1969, eight Communist Party of India (Marxist) members walked out of an All India Trade Union Congress executive committee meeting. Later, the Marxist break-away members organised an All India Trade Union Conference in Calcutta, on 28–31 May 1970. The Calcutta conference was the founding conference of the Centre of Indian Trade Unions, new Communist Party of India (Marxist) trade union.

== Collaborating with Congress ==
The issue whether to support Congress or not bedevilled the undivided Communist Party right from the year of independence, 1947, when the then general secretary P.C. Joshi strongly spoke in favour of it. Joshi was marginalised for this, yet the question persisted and was one of the reasons for the CPI split. It was increasingly becoming clear that anti-Congress faction, the Communist Party of India (Marxist) was stronger of the two groups.

In the late 1960s, however, the mood within the Communist Party of India turned strongly anti-Congress. In the Bombay party congress in 1968, the CPI took the decision of forging an anti-Congress front. This had resulted in collaborating with the Communist Party of India (Marxist) for a short while. Soon differences between both parties again came out in the open. From 1970 onwards Communist Party of India started once again working with the Congress. Dange was one of the principal architects of this union.

=== Bangladesh War ===
One of the events that facilitated cooperating with Congress was the Bangladesh Liberation War. In 1971 Bangladesh (formerly East Pakistan) declared its independence from Pakistan. The Pakistani military tried to quell the uprising; but Indian military intervention thwarted such moves. There was confusion within the ranks of the Indian communists—while the pro-Soviet CPI had no problem in supporting the war, and the Indian prime minister, Indira Gandhi, the CPI(M) found itself in quandary participated in the resistance struggle, the pro-China communist groups were in a quandary, because China had sided with Pakistan in the war.

==== CPI-led government in Kerala ====
During the period 1970–1977, CPI was a strong ally of the Congress party and nothing typified better than the alliance both the parties forged in Kerala. Both the parties formed a coalition government together in that state, with the CPI-leader C. Achutha Menon as the Chief Minister. In Kerala legislative elections held in 1970, the Communist Party of India won only 16 seats, out of a total of 133, whereas the coalition leader Indian National Congress had won 30 seats. Still, Congress accepted Achuta Menon's leadership till the next election that was held seven years later.

== The CPI and the Emergency ==
A state of emergency declared by Prime Minister Indira Gandhi, in June 1975, by invoking Article 352 of the Constitution of India, and it lasted for 21 months. Emergency provisions suspended all the Constitutional rights and gave power to rule by decree. It enabled the Prime Minister to suspend elections and civil liberties.

Indira Gandhi took this extreme step due to a host of reasons. The venerated Gandhian leader Jaya Prakash Narayan's agitation in Bihar for change in provincial government, was getting increasingly against the Central Government. More immediate reason for clamping of emergency was that in a judgment dated 12 June 1975, Justice Jagmohanlal Sinha of the Allahabad High Court held that Mrs. Gandhi was guilty on the charge of misuse of government machinery for her election campaign. The case was filed by Raj Narain, who had been recently defeated in the parliamentary election by Indira Gandhi. The court declared her election null and void and unseated her from her seat in Lok Sabha. The court also banned her from contesting any election for an additional six years.

=== CPI support to Indira Gandhi ===
CPI saw emergency as an opportunity and welcomed it 'as necessary to combat fascist movement led by Jaiprakash Narayan and the parties of right reaction. CPI leaders believed they could turn emergency into a communist revolution. Almost a decade of close cooperation with Indira Gandhi and the Congress seemed to be on the verge of bringing about a massive revolutionary breakthrough for the CPI.

=== Backlash: General elections, 1977 ===
In 1977, Indira Gandhi went for general elections and CPI was still supporting her. The Congress lost the elections and emergency was lifted. The CPI suffered its worst ever losses in general elections. CPI(M) was able to hold on to its base in West Bengal, but, electoral support for the CPI took a nosedive, as the following table shows:

Comparative Performance of the Communist Parties in General Elections of 1971 and 1977.

| Party | Seats(1971) | Seats (1977) | % of votes(1971) | % of votes(1977) |
|---|---|---|---|---|
| CPI | 23 | 07 | 4.73% | 2.82% |
| CPM | 25 | 22 | 5.12% | 4.29% |
| Total | 48 | 29 | 9.85% | 7.11% |

=== Towards left unity ===
To both the communist parties, election results raised serious questions regarding their relevance in the Indian political system. Newly strewn up Bharatiya Lok Dal – a medley of groups ranging from Congress rebels to Hindu party Jan Sangh – under the patronage of Jaiprakash Narayan, was able to garner 41.32% of the votes polled. Congress though lost heavily in terms of seats, still had 34.52% of popular votes. To the left parties the fact that these two parties accounted for more than three-fourths of the electorate and 449 out a total of 542 seats did suggest a possibility of a two (bourgeoisie) party political system. The result was a lot of soul searching for both the parties. Eventually both the parties regrouped and formed an alliance.

== Dange's isolation in CPI ==
As one of the few parties that supported emergency, the CPI was under attack from all other quarters. In spite of strong pro-Indira arguments presented by Dange, CPI in its eleventh party congress at Bhatinda, repudiated the support to emergency and opted for a new policy of left democratic unity. In Bhatinda congress two separate groupings emerged, one led by Dange and another led by C. Rajeswara Rao. The Rajeswara Rao's faction was victorious and the Bhatinda congress confirmed the shift towards creating alliances with leftist forces against Congress. Dange's pro-Congress line was severely tested within his own party. Similarly in their tenth party congress held at Jullunder around the same time, CPI(M) also decided pursue a path of left unity.

Even after Bhatinda congress, Dange was able to retain some of his influence though the majority was moving towards unity with CPI(M). The main reason for this was CPI sharing power with the Congress in Kerala.

Initially, both parties differed on the concept of what left and democratic unity would mean. This came out in open in when leaders of both parties met for the first time after 1964 split in New Delhi on 13 April 1978. In spite of repudiation of emergency, the CPI was not ready to change its overall assessment of Congress. Congress according to CPI contained left and democratic elements. This stand also justified continued cooperation between Congress and CPI in Kerala.

=== All India Communist Party ===
By 1980, the writing on the wall was clear. Poll alliance between CPI and CPI(M) was forged. CPI had parted ways with Congress in Kerala. The Dange group within the party was reduced to an insignificant minority. In 1980 a section of CPI cadre who wanted to retain the close relationship with the Congress, broke away from the Party and formed All India Communist Party. Roza Deshpande, the daughter of Dange and her husband Bani Deshpande, played an important role in organising the founding of the new party. It is said that Dange himself was initially largely sceptical of a split in the CPI.

The founders of All India Communist Party retained close communications with Dange. In May, 1981 the National Council of CPI expelled Dange. When the first conference of AICP was held in Meerut, commencing on 13 March. Dange turned up there uninvited and took charge of the new party. He was elected general secretary of the party.

== Marginalization within the communist movement ==
Although having Dange as its leader, AICP was not able to attract any major nationwide following for two main reasons. Firstly, the Soviet Union did not give any political support to the new party. The founders of AICP were upholding the pro-Soviet CPI policy of cooperating with the National Congress, but the Soviets were not interested in a split within CPI. Secondly, the Congress showed limited interest towards the idea of having a national alliance with the new party.

=== AICP versus Congress ===
In the end, the two parties would be poised against each other in several local elections. Not only that, the Congress successfully outmaneuvered the new party in taking over a pro-Soviet goodwill organisation. As an alternative to the CPI-controlled Indian-Soviet Cultural Society (ISCUS), members of AICP and the Congress had set up the Friends of the Soviet Union. Eventually the control over this organisation was completely taken over by the Congress.

=== Merger into United Communist Party of India ===
In 1987 AICP merged with the Indian Communist Party and formed the United Communist Party of India. Veteran communist leader Mohit Sen was the general secretary of the party until his death in 2003.

The party failed to register any presence in the country. In the 2007 assembly election in Uttar Pradesh, UCPI launched three candidates, Devi Dayal Yadav in Karki (572 votes, 0.49% of the votes in the constituency), Anand Kumar in Baberu (899 votes, 0.82%) and Vimal Krishan Srivastav in Banda (456 voes, 0.39%). Similarly, in 2006 Tamil Nadu elections, UCPI could garner only 921 votes in the state.

== Death and legacy ==
Dange died at a Bombay hospital on 22 May 1991. He was given a state funeral by the Maharashtra state government. He was survived by his wife Ushatai and daughter, Roza Deshpande. Dange’s legacy remains contested. Supporters regard him as a pioneer of Indian Marxism and a founder of organised labour movements. Critics, however, see him as emblematic of the ideological conflicts between international communism and India’s indigenous nationalist movement. His opposition to the Quit India Movement and his early appeal for clemency under British rule have continued to invite debate among historians. In independent India’s political memory, Dange represents both the intellectual vigour and the ideological dissonance of communism within a civilisation striving for self-definition and autonomy. Historians have noted that while Dange contributed significantly to India’s trade union movement and parliamentary Left, his ideological framework shaped by global communist priorities lacked a distinct vision for India as a sovereign nation-state with its own cultural and historical continuity.

=== Birth centenary ===
Seven years later, in 1998, it was decided to celebrate his birth centenary celebrations, starting from 10 October that year in a gathering of trade unionists in Mumbai. A committee was set up to undertake a project for instituting a memorial to Dange. The concept of the memorial approved in the meeting was that it would house a modern education centre, a large library and facilities for research on various issues concerning the working class movement. There will also be a trade union school with hostel and canteen facilities. This project did not take off.

Another attempt by various communist organisations was to hold a national communist conference in Mumbai on the occasion of Dange's birth centenary celebrations. But this had failed due to the paucity of funds. The communist organisations could not raise sufficient funds nor could find a generous sponsor to host the meet in Dange's own city. Therefore, the venue of the conference was shifted to Kerala.

=== Honour by the Indian Parliament ===
On 10 December 2004, The Indian Parliament honoured Dange when Dr. Manmohan Singh, Prime Minister of India unveiled his statue along with other left leaders such as Acharya Narendra Deva and A.K. Gopalan in Parliament House. The 9-feet high bronze statue of Dange, sculpted by Vithoba Panchal, has been donated by the labour organisation, Shramik Pratishthan, Mumbai.

== Mitrokhin Archives ==
Controversies continued to dog Dange even after death. In what were supposedly based on KGB documents, notes smuggled out by former KGB spy Vasili Mitrokhin at the time of his defection to Britain, Christopher Andrew published, in 2005, a book Mitrokhin Archive II, that contained details of alleged transactions between the CPI and the KGB during 1975–76, and it claimed that the money exchanged was between 400,000 and 800,000 rupees a month. The supposed KGB papers claim that deceased CPI leaders Dange and C. Rajeswara Rao regularly received bribes and favours from the Russians in the mid-1970s and Dange even issued receipts for the money he received. This money changed hands from car windows in desolate areas near New Delhi, the book claimed.

Mitrokhin Archives are not KGB papers per se, but were notes taken by Vasili Mitrokhin over 30 years. CPI questioned the authenticity of these papers. "This is utter nonsense. We have said this before and we say it again that these documents haven't been verified and no one knows if these are real KGB papers," said CPI leader Manju Kumar Majumder, when the book was out, Academicians like J. Arch Getty and counter-intelligence specialists had questioned the veracity of these papers.

=== Benediktov Diaries ===
Diaries of I. A. Benediktov, Russian ambassador to India during the 1960s named Indian communist leaders seeking aid from the Soviet Union. Dange's name figured in the first excerpt is from a 17 January 1962 entry from the journal Benediktov describing a conversation with Bhupesh Gupta, the then Secretary of the National Council of CPI.

Gupta reported that after the death of Ghosh at the present time in the party there is an acute insufficiency of means for the preelection campaign. He expressed the fear that with the death of Ghosh the source for receiving means for the communist party from the CPSU might be closed. These questions were handled by Ghosh alone, Gupta underscored. He never consulted with him /Gupta/, and even less with [Elamulam M.S.] Nambudiripad and G. Nair/ with the latter two only about using the assistance/. All these matters were held in strictest secrecy from other leaders of the party and members of the National Council. This explains the fact that not a single report on this question has appeared in the press. Gupta said that he cannot singlehandedly take on responsibility in questions of assistance, therefore he considers it necessary to consult with Nambudiripad, whom he characterized as a person of crystalline honesty and whom Ghosh trusted. Gupta confidentially reported that A. Ghosh had not consulted on this problem with Akhmed or with [Shripad Amrit] Dange, who once proposed that he entrust to him alone all matters connected with the receipt of aid from abroad.

In as much as Mitrokhin archive was based entirely on notes based on alleged primary sources, the Benediktov diaries also brought in Dange through a mere hearsay. Both these documents were used by the critics of totalitarian communism to attack the communist parties and Dange.

== Dange the author ==
Dange's arrival in the political arena was through the pamphlet Gandhi vs. Lenin that got him two important contacts of his youth: M. N. Roy and Lotwala, the rich flour-mill owner from Bombay. The latter helped him to launch the first ever socialist magazine in India, The Socialist. Mohit Sen said that Dange's articles in The Socialist impressed Lenin himself.

Dange was a keen follower of literature. He had published a book called Literature and People that advocated socialist realism, as opposed to elitism.

=== From Primitive Communism to Slavery ===
Dange's major work, From Primitive Communism to Slavery was published in 1949. The book attempted to analyze stages of growth of society in ancient India. The author had painfully researched ancient scriptures and other sources to make it a definitive tome. Engels' book The Origin of the Family, Private Property and the State was the kind of road map he used. He analyzed the ancient epics to arrive at the reasons for origin of private property in India. The first draft of the book was written in Yerwada Central Jail between October 1942 and January 1943.

Dange's magnum opus was severely criticised by historian D. D. Kosambi, who said that to defend Engels, he had to deny Dange. He went on to say that Dange's work was unquestionably a caricature of Engel's work. Kosambi, said in a review: 'This is so wildly improbable as to plunge into the ridiculous'. He was also especially severe when he said, 'Marxism is not a substitute for thinking, but a tool of analysis which must be used, with a certain minimum of skill and understanding, upon the proper material.

The book was released in 2002, under the title Vedic India by his daughter Roza and her husband, Bani Deshpande. Dange was again criticised for "his ideas on ancient India and his discovery of the ideals of communism in the primitive ages (and hence a glorification of the ancient culture) left him exposed to charges of having read Marxism in the most unscientific fashion".
