= Marxist Manch =

The Marxist Manch (Marxist Platform) is a political party in Assam, India, which emerged as a local splinter group of Communist Party of India (Marxist). The party has some base in the Ratabari assembly constituency, where it has entered into electoral cooperation with Asom Gana Parishad. The party was divided in two factions, but reunited ahead of a 2003 bypoll in Ratabari. Abdul Khalik Bangal became president of the party and Chinmoy Choudhury general secretary after reunification.

Marxist Manch took part in the founding of the Confederation of Indian Communists and Democratic Socialists in 2002.
