= Paschimbanga Ganatantrik Manch =

Paschimbanga Ganatantrik Manch (PBGM) (translation: West Bengal Democratic Platform) is a political party in the Indian state of West Bengal. PGM was formed in 1999 by expelled members of Communist Party of India (Marxist). The convenor of PGM is Sumanta Hira, former member of the Legislative Assembly of West Bengal for CPI(M).

In the 2001 state assembly elections Hira stood as the only PGM candidate, contesting the Taltola seat. He got 551 votes (0.7%). The party later renamed as Peoples Revolutionary Party of India.

OCP participates in the Confederation of Indian Communists and Democratic Socialists.
