= Tripura Ganatantrik Manch =

Tripura Ganatantrik Manch is a splinter group of Janganotantrik Morcha, which itself is a splinter group of Communist Party of India (Marxist) in Tripura.

The leader of Tripura Ganatantrik Manch is Ajoy Biswas.

TGM participates in the Confederation of Indian Communists and Democratic Socialists.
