= Utkal Prantiya Marwari Yuva Manch =

- Logo of AIMYM
- Founded: 14 February 1988
- Type: Voluntary
- Location: 505, Bhagwan Tower, Laxmi Sagar, Bhubaneswar, Odisha
- Product: Manch base:public service Manch insight:social reform Manch strength:individual development Manch desire:social-dignity and self security Manch goal:national development & unity
- Members: nearly 5,000 young active citizens statewide
- Key people: Yuva Ravi Agrawal Yuva Madhusudan Sharma
- Publication: "Manch Sandesh"
- Website: www.opmym.com

Utkal Prantiya Marwari Yuva Manch (Hindi: उत्कल प्रांतीय मारवाड़ी युवा मंच, Oriya: ଉତ୍କଳ ପ୍ରାନ୍ତୀୟ ମାରବାଡି ଯୁବା ମଞ୍ଚ) is a state wing of national-level organization Marwari Yuva Manch It is one of the largest volunteer organizations in Odisha, having 5000 members and 125 branches in different cities and villages. The membership of Marwari Yuva Manch is limited to only Marwari community, but the service provided by this organization provides to people without any bias in religion or community or any other basics. The main aim of the MANCH is to organize the youth force and prepare them to contribute to the progress of the community as well as of the Nation.

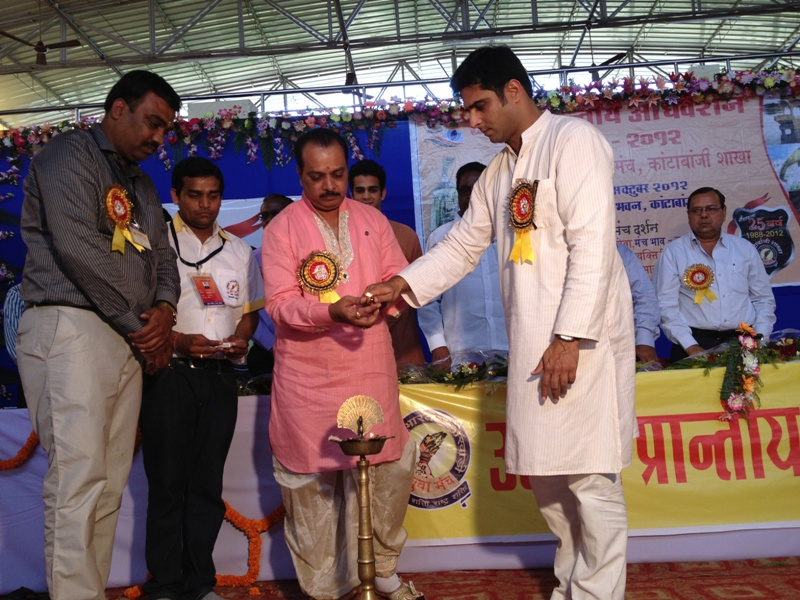
UPMYM Convention Ceremony

== All Cauntery yuva manch ==
There are 24 ambulances and dead body van, 138 Amrit Dhara (Cold Water Project), 361 oxygen cylinders are available across Odisha. Approximately 20,000 limbs have been distributed with the goal of disabled free Odisha. 1483 polio surgeries have been conducted. Every year blood donation approximately 4000.

Ambulance Service by Marwari Yuva Manch in Odisha

- Ambulances Services
- Artificial Limb Camp
- Blood Donation Service
- Oxygen Service
- AmritDhara
- Mobile Cancer Detection Van

== Leadership ==
The leadership is vested in the hands of the president elected by the members of electoral college which consists of branch president, secretary and state committee members, but most of the decisions taken by the executive body formulated by the elected president which consist of general members of Marwari Yuva Manch of different branches of the state.

The serving president is Yuva Madhusudan Sharma, who succeeded Yuva Ramesh Agrawal in 2015 .The election of the president is conducted in every 2–3 years.

== Incumbency of President ==
Year	Name
1988–1990	Jugal Kishore Sultania
1990–1993	Narayan Prasad Modi
1993–1996	Kailash Prasad Agrawal
1996–2000	Omprakash Tulsyan
2000–2003	Lal Chand Sharma
2003–2006	Shyam Sunder Agrawal
2006–2009	Jitendra Gupta
2009–2012	Rinku Agrawal
2012–2015	Ramesh Agrawal
2015–2018	Madhusudan Sharma
2018–Present	Manish Agrawal
