= Mohit Sen =

Indian politician

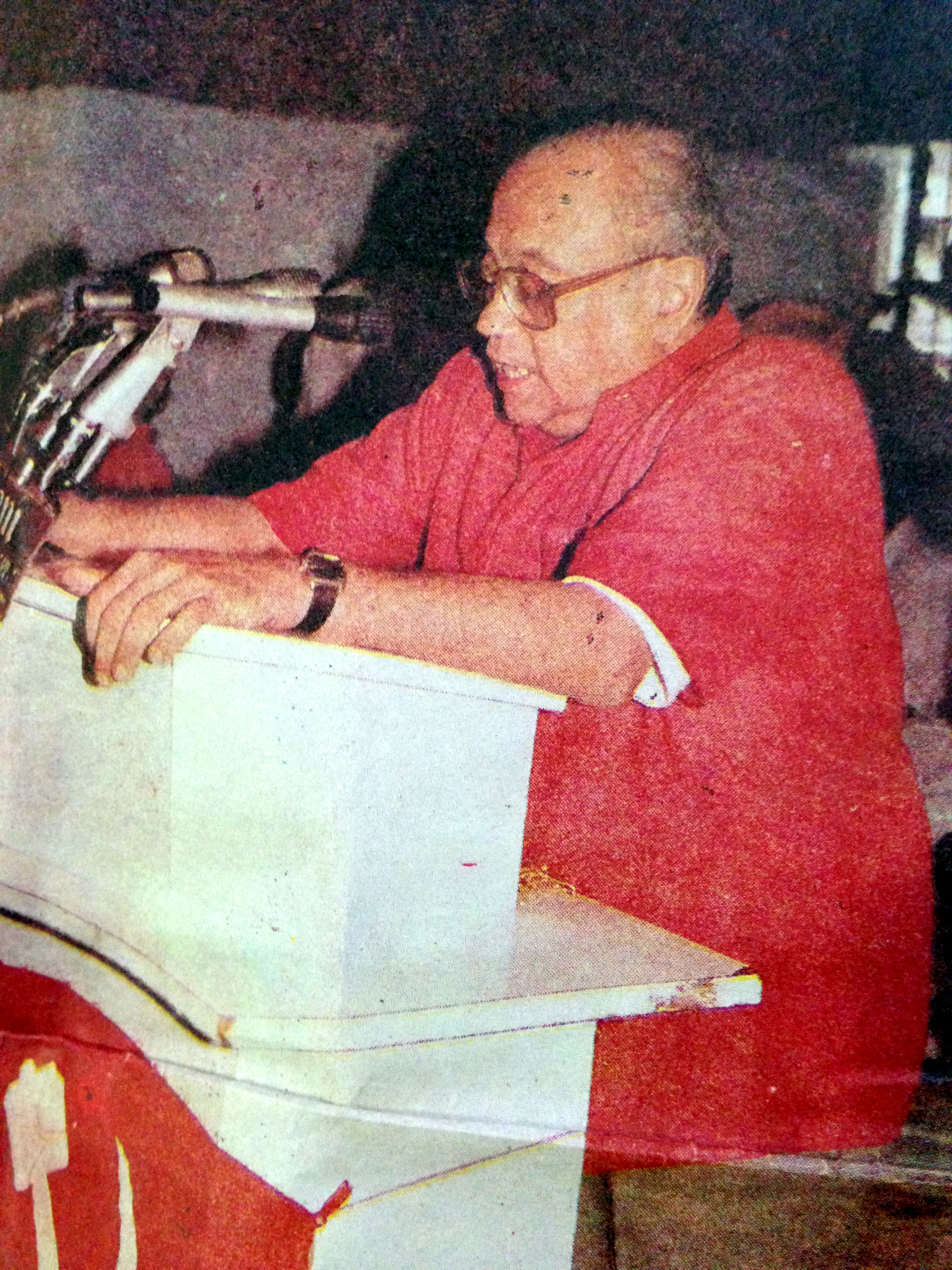
Mohit Sen

Mohit Sen (born 24 March 1929, in Calcutta, and died in Hyderabad on 3 May 2003) was a communist intellectual. He was general secretary of the United Communist Party of India at the time of his death.

== Early life and education ==
Sen was born into a progressive and westernised Brahmo Samaj family. His father, Justice Amarendra Nath Sen, was a judge of the Calcutta High Court and his mother, Mrinalini Sen (née Sinha), was an eminent dancer. His paternal grandfather was an Advocate General of Burma. His maternal grandfather was Major N.P. Sinha, a member of the Indian Medical Service and his mother's elder uncle was Lord Satyendra Prasanno Sinha, the first Indian Governor of Bihar. On his mother's side he came from the zamindari family of Raipur in Birbhum, a district in present-day West Bengal. He had five other brothers, the eldest of whom was Sh. Pratap Chandra Sen, a student of history at Presidency College, Calcutta, who rose to a high position in a mercantile firm in Calcutta in spite of remaining a closet communist. Mohit Sen had his early education at the Presidency College, Calcutta, where he was a student of Professor Susobhan Sarkar. Later he studied at the University of Cambridge, UK.

== In communist movement ==
While in Cambridge, in 1948, he joined the Communist Party of India (CPI) as a 'candidate-member'. Also in Cambridge he met and married Vanaja Iyengar, who became an eminent mathematician later, in 1950. After marriage the couple moved to the People's Republic of China. Sen went to the China International Communist School in Beijing between 1950 and 1953. After his return to India, Mohit Sen worked in the CPI central office in New Delhi and also for its publishing house during 1953–62. Later he became party organiser and teacher in Andhra Pradesh.

== Political life ==
Mohit Sen arrived in India during a period when India had won her independence. The appraisal of the CPI at that time was that the country had not really got freedom, but was still a 'semi-colony' of Britain. The following words of Jawaharlal Nehru, who was then prime minister, to visiting Soviet leaders Nikolai Bulganin and Nikita Khrushchev in 1955, aptly summarises the CPI's position then:

Until this year (1955) the Communist Party was saying that Indian people were not independent; they even opposed our National Day celebrations.... They also said that when they were in doubt about the right line of action, they had to get directions from the Soviet Union. Early in 1951–52, some principal leaders of the Communist Party went to Moscow secretly, that is without passports. They came back and said that they had got directions from Mr. Joseph Stalin. At least this is what they said. The line then laid down was one of full opposition (to the Government) and, where possible, petty insurrections.

Mohit Sen stood for collaboration with Congress for fighting against imperialist forces. When the CPI split, and gave rise to a new party, the Communist Party of India (Marxist), Sen remained with the original CPI, under chairmanship of S.A. Dange, which was following nationalist line. He became a national council member of CPI in 1966 and was elected to party central executive committee in 1971. Sen parted ways with the CPI, following its anti-Congress stand, in 1978, following Indira Gandhi's emergency and subsequent failure in the election. After the United Communist Party of India was formed, Sen became its general secretary, a post he held for 15 years till his death. He was married to Vanaja Iyengar, a mathematician, Padma Shri awardee and founder vice chancellor of Sri Padmavati Mahila Visvavidyalayam and at the time of his death, Sen, 74, was a widower and had no children.

== Writer ==
Sen was a prolific writer; credited to him are following books:

- Revolution in India — Problems and Perspectives
- Glimpses of the History of the Communist movement in India
- Maoism and Chinese Revolution
- Congress and socialism
- Naxalites and the Communists, and
- A Traveller And The Road: A Journey Of An Indian Communist.

Mohit Sen appearing on the cover of his autobiography

=== A Traveller and the Road: A Journey of an Indian Communist ===
He published his autobiography A Traveller and the Road: A Journey of an Indian Communist in March 2003, few months before his death. The book brought out Sen's evolution as an independent leftist thinker. Eric Hobsbawm, the historian, had opined about the book that

"… it is a most remarkable book, written with unremitting passion and love, with acute observation of those who gave their lives to the case, but with sceptical judgment. In my view no more illuminating first-hand book on the history of Indian Communism has been written, nor is likely to be written… India was lucky to enter independence with people as honest, as selfless, and as devoted to service of the people as he."
