= Samir Putatundu =

Indian politician (1952–2026)

Personal details
- Born: 9 August 1952 Jadavpur, South Calcutta, West Bengal, India
- Died: 11 January 2026 (aged 73) Kolkata, West Bengal, India
- Party: Party of Democratic Socialism; Communist Party of India (Marxist)
- Spouse: Anuradha Putatunda
- Education: University of Calcutta
- Profession: Politician, social worker

Samir Putatundu (9 August 1952 – 11 January 2026) was an Indian CPI(M) politician from the state of West Bengal. He was the General Secretary of Party of Democratic Socialism (PDS).

Putatundu contested the Jadavpur assembly constituency in the 2011 West Bengal assembly election, running against the incumbent Chief Minister Buddhadev Bhattacharya. Putatundu got 34002 votes (0.17%).

Putatundu died after a long illness on 11 January 2026, at the age of 73.
