= Mancha del Júcar =

Mancha del Júcar is a comarca of the Province of Albacete, Spain.
