= Mancha-Centro =

Comarca of the Province of Albacete, Spain

Mancha-Centro is a comarca of the Province of Albacete, Spain.
