= Rashtriya Swabhiman Manch =

Rashtriya Swabhiman Manch (National Prestige Forum) (राष्ट्रीय स्वाभिमान मंच) is a forum established by some Indian opposition leaders to oppose the policies of the ruling UPA front headed by Sonia Gandhi. They are of the view that national security and national sovereignty had come under threat under the United Progressive Alliance Government.

The chief organisers of the forum were Subramanian Swamy, Chandra Shekhar and George Fernandes. It was established on 12 October 2004, the birthday of Jai Prakash Narayan.

The forum seems to be inactive now.
