= Ramgopal Mancha =

General information
- Status: Active
- Location: Opposite to Howrah Girls' College
- Address: P14, Biplabi Harendra Ghosh Sarani, Howrah 711 101
- Town or city: Howrah
- Country: India
- Owner: Howrah Sanskrit Sahitya Samaj

Website
- http://www.hsss.org.in

Ramgopal Mancha is a theatre auditorium located in Howrah, West Bengal, India. It is owned by Howrah Sanskrit Sahitya Samaj and named after one of the founders of Howrah Sanskrit Sahitya Samaj - Pundit Ramgopal Mukhopadhyay Smritiratna.

The hall has Air Conditioning facility, capacity is about 300. Many theatre troops perform here regularly, namely, Natadha, Kolkata Romroma, 4th Bell Theatres, Theatre Formation Paribartak, Howrah Anubhash, Manchak etc.
