= Mancha Júcar-Centro =

Coordinates: 39°11′54″N 2°05′36″W

Mancha Júcar-Centro is a comarca of the Province of Albacete, Spain.
