= United Communist Party of India =

- Abbreviation: UCPI
- General Secretary: Sukhinder Singh Dhaliwal
- Founded: May 1989
- Merger of: All India Communist Party; Indian Communist Party; All India Communist Co-ordination Committee
- Headquarters: 29/116, Gali No.10, Vishwas Nagar, Shahadra, Delhi-110 032
- Ideology: Communism
- Political position: Left-wing
- Alliance: Confederation of Indian Communists and Democratic Socialists

The United Communist Party of India (UCPI) is a political party in India. The party was founded in May 1989 through the merger of splinter groups of the Communist Party of India (CPI), representing the most right-wing tendency of the Indian communist movement. The UCPI supported united front with the Congress-I. The founding leaders of the party were veteran communist leaders S.A. Dange and Mohit Sen. The party had one representative in the Lok Sabha (lower house of the parliament of India), D. Pandian, and held one seat in the Tamil Nadu Legislative Assembly 1989–1996. D. Pandian returned to CPI in 2000, and the influence of UCPI dwindled in later years.

== December 1988 Bombay conference ==
A party unity conference was held in Bombay 21–22 December 1988, at which the All India Communist Party (AICP, a party founded in 1980 and mainly based in Bombay, led by S.A. Dange who had broken with CPI for abandoning its United Front policy for alliance with the Congress-I), Indian Communist Party (ICP, a 1987 splinter group of CPI in Tamil Nadu) and the All India Communist Co-ordination Committee (whose convenor was Mohit Sen). The conference agreed that the parties would merge into a single party, called the Communist Party, with S.A. Dange as chairman and Sen as general secretary. Roza Deshpande, Ramesh Sinha, D. Pandian and K.M. Sundaram were elected secretaries of the new party.

Sen spoke at a press conference on 23 December 1988 in Bombay, stating that the new party would be a party of 'communist renewal'. Sen argued that the governing National Front and Janata Dal were reactionary communal forces seeking to divide the country. Sen outlined four objective of the new party - to attack imperialist forces, unity with Congress-I against anti-democratic forces, unity of progressive communist parties and agreement with the Soviet policies of glasnost and perestroika.

In January 1989, during the campaigning for the 1989 Tamil Nadu Legislative Assembly election, Sen stated that the party would not be seen as a new party but a continuation of the Communist Party of India founded in Kanpur in 1925. He stated that the merger of the three parties would be formalized at a party conference in Tamil Nadu in April or May 1989. Sen argued for opposition to the Dravida Munnetra Kazhagam (DMK), as DMK was in the National Front and thus a reactionary force. One of the ICP candidates, N. Nanjappan, won the Pennagaram seat of the Tamil Nadu Legislative Assembly.

== May 1989 Salem conference ==
The party merger conference was held 25–30 May 1989 in Salem. The ICP acted as the hosts for the conference. Some one thousand delegates attended the conference, claiming to represent 100,000 party members. Delegates came from Andhra Pradesh, Assam, Bihar, Goa, Kerala, Maharashtra, Punjab, Tamil Nadu, Uttar Pradesh and West Bengal. Most of the delegates were in the age range 35–60 years, but conference organizers claimed that one third of delegates were below 35 years (with 150 delegates in the age range 18–25 years). There were also veterans from the CPI from the pre-Independence period. CPI(M) dissidents participated in the Salem conference as fraternal delegates. Sen held an hour-long inaugural speech at the Salem conference, arguing that the October Revolution had resulted in the foundation of CPI in 1925 and that the new party was being founded in the era of glasnost and the perestroika (which Sen framed as a 'second October Revolution'). The merged party took the name United Communist Party of India. Dange was elected chairman, Sen general secretary.

The UCPI placed itself to the right of CPI. The party called for National Democratic Revolution by non-violent means, striving to build a patriotic front. UCPI pleaded to the main communist parties, the CPI and the CPI(M), not to align with the 'forces of right reaction and counter-revolution'. UCPI favoured cooperation with the Congress-I, arguing that it represented the national bourgeoisie. UCPI had a pro-Soviet, albeit pro-perestroika outlook.

The new party had its main strength in Tamil Nadu (primarily in industrial pockets). It also some support in industrial pockets in Bombay. The party led some splinter trade unions. T.K. Varghese Vaidyan became the main organiser of UCPI in Kerala.

== 1989-1990 elections ==
In November 1989 parliamentary election, D. Pandian was elected to the Lok Sabha (lower house of the parliament of India) contesting on the Congress-I election symbol in the Madras North constituency. D. Pandian obtained 445,197 votes (54.84%).

UPCI fielded five candidates in the February 1990 Bihar Legislative Assembly election, whom together got 17,211 votes. UCPI fielded a single candidate in the February 1990 Orissa Legislative Assembly election - UCPI candidate Jogendra Prasad Das finished in second place in the Balasore constituency with 7,213 votes (8.01%), trailing behind CPI candidate Arun Dey won obtained 86.56% of the votes.

Following the 20 June 1990 killing of 13 EPRLF cadres in Madras, UCPI leader D. Pandian joined opposition in parties demanding the resignation of the DMK state government, holding the state government responsible for the killings. In August 1990 UCPI joined the AIADMK-led Democratic Progressive Front. In November 1990 UCPI welcomed the fall of the V.P. Singh government at the national level, and formation of Chandra Shekhar ministry.

== 1991 elections ==
Ahead of the 1991 parliamentary election and Tamil Nadu Legislative Assembly election held in parallel, UCPI had not been allocated seats to contest by the Congress-I as of mid-April 1991. UCPI had asked party members wanting to stand as candidates to file their nominations, and that decisions on whether contest or not would be taken at a later stage. On 23 April 1991 UCPI announced that it would field six Legislative Assembly candidates in Coimbatore district, despite the fact that the party had not been allocated any seats by the Congress-I/AIADMK front. UCPI contested one seat in the April 24, 1991 West Bengal Legislative Assembly election under its own symbol, as part of the Congress-I-led alliance. UCPI candidate Satya Bosal in the Chandrakona constituency finished in second place with 40,806 votes (36.21%).

In the end Congress-I allocated one Lok Sabha seat to UCPI, with D. Pandian standing for re-election in Madras North constituency. During the electoral campaign, on 21 May 1991 D. Pandian accompanied Prime Minister Rajiv Gandhi at a campaign meeting in Sriperumbudur, acting as the translator of Gandhi's speech into Tamil language. D. Pandian was severely injured in the bomb blast that killed Gandhi.

The next day UCPI founder Dange died, at the age of 91 years. A non-religious state funeral was held for him. Tens of thousands of workers joined the funeral procession in Bombay.

D. Pandian was re-elected to the Lok Sabha, obtaining 400,454 votes (54.61%) and defeating 23 other candidates in Madras North. In the Tamil Nadu Legislative Assembly election, one UCPI candidate won a seat (S.V. Shanmugam, contesting the Madurai West seat). S.V. Shanmugam obtained 59,586 votes (63.35%), contesting on the Congress-I election symbol. UCPI had fielded three candidates in the 1991 Kerala Legislative Assembly election, obtaining a total of 1,344 votes.

== 1992 Punjab elections ==
UCPI fielded a single candidate in the February 1992 Punjab Legislative Assembly election. Baldev Singh Ballamgarh won the Malout seat, obtaining 14,442 votes (36.96%) and defeating the Congress-I candidate Shiv Chand.

== April 1992 Guntur conference ==
UCPI held a national party conference in Guntur April 25–28, 1992. The conference adopted a resolution demanding a ban imposed on the LTTE. Another resolution called on the national government to resolve the Cauvery water dispute by linking the Mahanadi, Godavari, Cauvery, Krishna and Vaigai rivers. The party was now led by D. Pandian as party chairman and Sen as general secretary. V. Rajamohan served as the assistant party secretary. As of the mid-1990s N. Nanjappan was the president of the UCPI Tamil Nadu state unit.

== Babri Masjid demolition and split in UCPI ==
In the wake of the 6 December 1992 demolition of the Babri Masjid, UCPI endorsed a ban on communal organisations. D. Pandian hailed the position of CPI, CPI(M) and other left parties on the issue, and called on Congress-I to rally other secular forces whilst cautioning the Congress-I on the potential implications of the implementation of the ban. The position on banning communal organisations would provoke a split with the UCPI. Roza Deshpande supported the Babri Masjid demolition and similar movements in Kashi and Mathura. She criticised the ban on the RSS, the VHP and the Bajrang Dal, and the arrest of L.K. Advani. In January 1993 the UCPI Central Committee expelled Roza Deshpande from the party. Soon thereafter, the UCPI Central Committee took disciplinary actions against the Bombay unit of the party, for not having expelled Roza Deshpande's husband Bani. The Bihar, Orissa and Uttar Pradesh units of the party rejected the expulsions and dissolved in protest.

== Confederation of splinter groups ==
On 20 March 1993 UCPI took part in a meeting in Thiruvanathapuram, organised by the Communist Marxist Party where six CPI and CPI(M) splinter groups formed a joint All India confederation. Mohit Sen was named as one of the five convenors of the Confederation. D. Pandian took part in the meeting.

== Split in Punjab ==
On 10 April 1993 a meeting in Muktsar passed a resolution calling for the merger of the Punjab UCPI state unit with the Congress-I. A conference held in Talwandi Sabo, chaired by Sardar Beant Singh (Chief Minister, Leader of the Congress Legislature Party in the Punjab Legislative Assembly and President of the Punjab Pradesh Congress-I Committee) endorse the decision to merge the UCPI state unit into Congress-I. On 15 July 1993 the sole UCPI Member of the Punjab Legislative Assembly Baldev Singh Ballamgarh requested to be recognised as part of the Congress-I Legislature Party. His request was endorsed by Sardar Beant Singh, as the head of the Punjab Pradesh Congress-I Committee. On 16 July 1993 Deputy Speaker (acting as the Speaker) Romesh Chander Dogra approved the merger of the erstwhile UCPI legislator into the Congress-I Legislature Party.

== 1993 by-polls and Mandal issue ==
In the run-up to the 20 September 1993 Tamil Nadu by-elections, UCPI opposed the calls to unseat the AIADMK-led state government. The UCPI called for reviving the Congress-I/AIADMK-led Progressive Democratic Front. The party welcomed the national government decision to implement the Mandal Commission recommendations, urging the government to begin implementing the 27 percent quota for Backward Castes.

== D. Pandian breaking with UCPI ==
D. Pandian ran for re-election in Madras North in the 1996 parliamentary elections, again contesting on the Congress election symbol. He finished in second place with 169,431 votes (20.04%). In the 1998 parliamentary election, UCPI was part of the Congress-I-led front in Tamil Nadu. D. Pandian contested on a Congress symbol in the Madurai seat - he obtained 17,507 votes (2.66%). UCPI fielded a single candidate on its on symbol in the 1998 parliamentary elections, P.K. Pattabiraman obtained 10,018 votes (1.61%) in the Dharmapuri constituency. D. Pandian rejoined the CPI in 2000.

== Later years ==
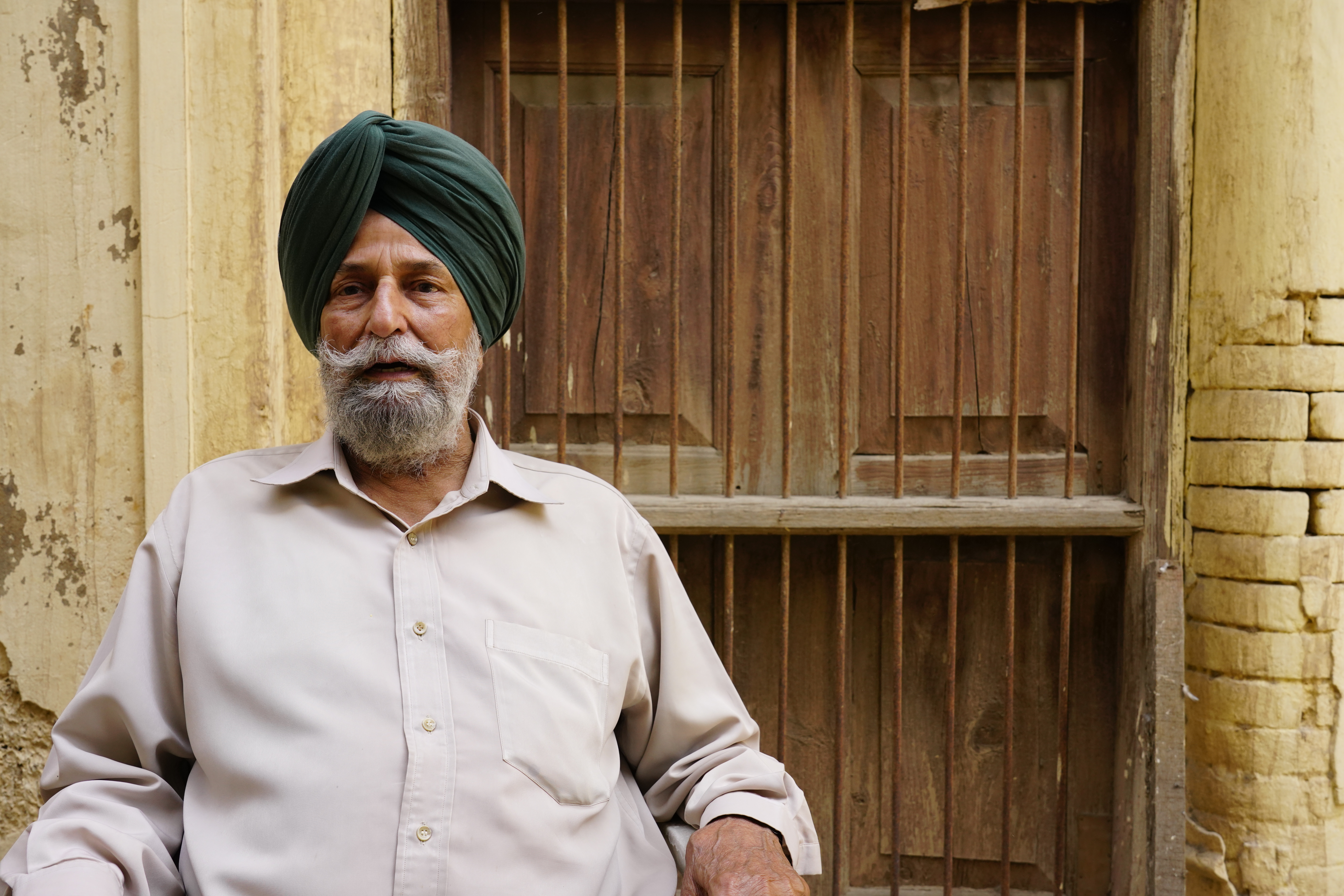
Sukhinder Singh Dhaliwal

Mohit Sen died on 3 May 2003. As of 2004, Sukhinder Singh Dhaliwal was the All India general secretary of the party. He had previously been the president of the UCPI Punjab state unit. Ahead of the 2004 parliamentary election, the UCPI Punjab unit resolved to support Congress and CPI candidates, seeking to defeat the Shiromani Akali Dal-BJP combine. UCPI fielded a single candidate in the 2009 parliamentary election, Anand in Banda constituency (who got 1,713 votes). The party fielded three candidates in the 2014 parliamentary election, whom together obtained 6,472 votes.
