= Sikkim Ekta Manch =

Political party in Sikkim, India

Sikkim Ekta Manch (translation: Sikkim Unity Platform), was a political party in the Indian state of Sikkim founded in August 1997, when Laxmi Parasad Tiwari and T. M. Rai broke from the Indian National Congress (INC). The party drew dissident members from the ruling Sikkim Democratic Front and the INC, who claimed the new party would promote a Sikkim free of caste or communal based politics.

In the October 1997 panchayat (local) elections, the first local elections in Sikkim to allow political parties, the SEM criticised this "politicization" and only fielded independent candidates.

Shortly thereafter, Rai broke away from the SEM to form the Sikkim Janshakti Party.

In the 1998 general election SEM ran a joint candidate with Congress, the Sikkim Sangram Parishad and the Sikkim National Front for the state's single Lok Sabha seat.

In November 1998 SEM merged with INC.
