= Sri Padmavati Mahila Visvavidyalayam =

Women's University in Andhra Pradesh, India

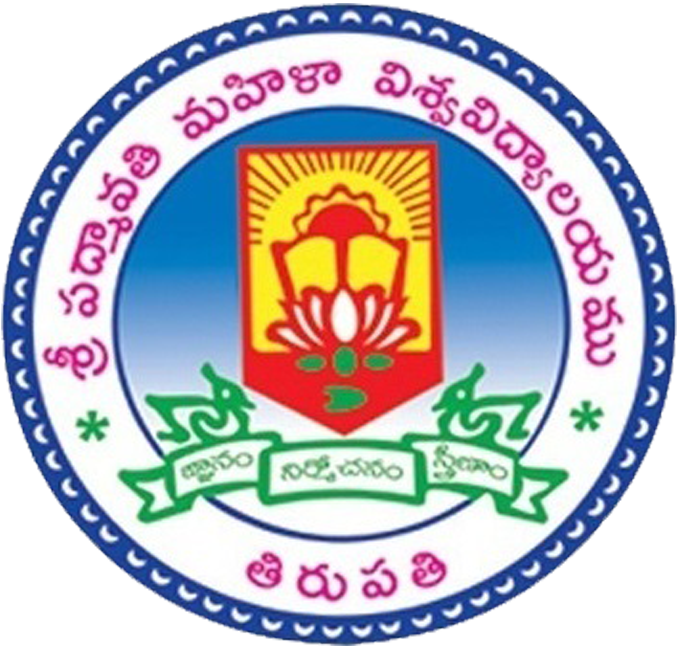
- Type: Public
- Established: 1983; 43 years ago
- Founder: N. T. Rama Rao
- Accreditation: NAAC 'A+' Grade
- Chancellor: Governor of Andhra Pradesh
- Vice-Chancellor: V. Uma
- Location: Padmavati Nagar, Tirupati District, Tirupati, Andhra Pradesh, 517502, India
- Campus: 138 acres
- Website: https://www.spmvv.ac.in

Sri Padmavati Mahila Visvavidyalayam (Sri Padmavati University) is a women's university in Tirupati, Andhra Pradesh, India. It was established as a state university by the Andhra Pradesh legislature in 1983 to provide Higher Education in general & professional areas for women. It is named after the goddess Sri Padmavati, the consort of Lord Venkateswara. The university has approximately 5,000 students. It admits students from all regions of Andhra Pradesh.

Funds for development are received from the UGC and State Government. The university is accredited with 'A+' grade by the National Assessment and Accreditation Council. Prof. V.Uma, Department of Social Work, Sri Padmavati Mahila Visvavidyalayam, Tirupati was appointed as the In-charge Vice-Chancellor in 2024.

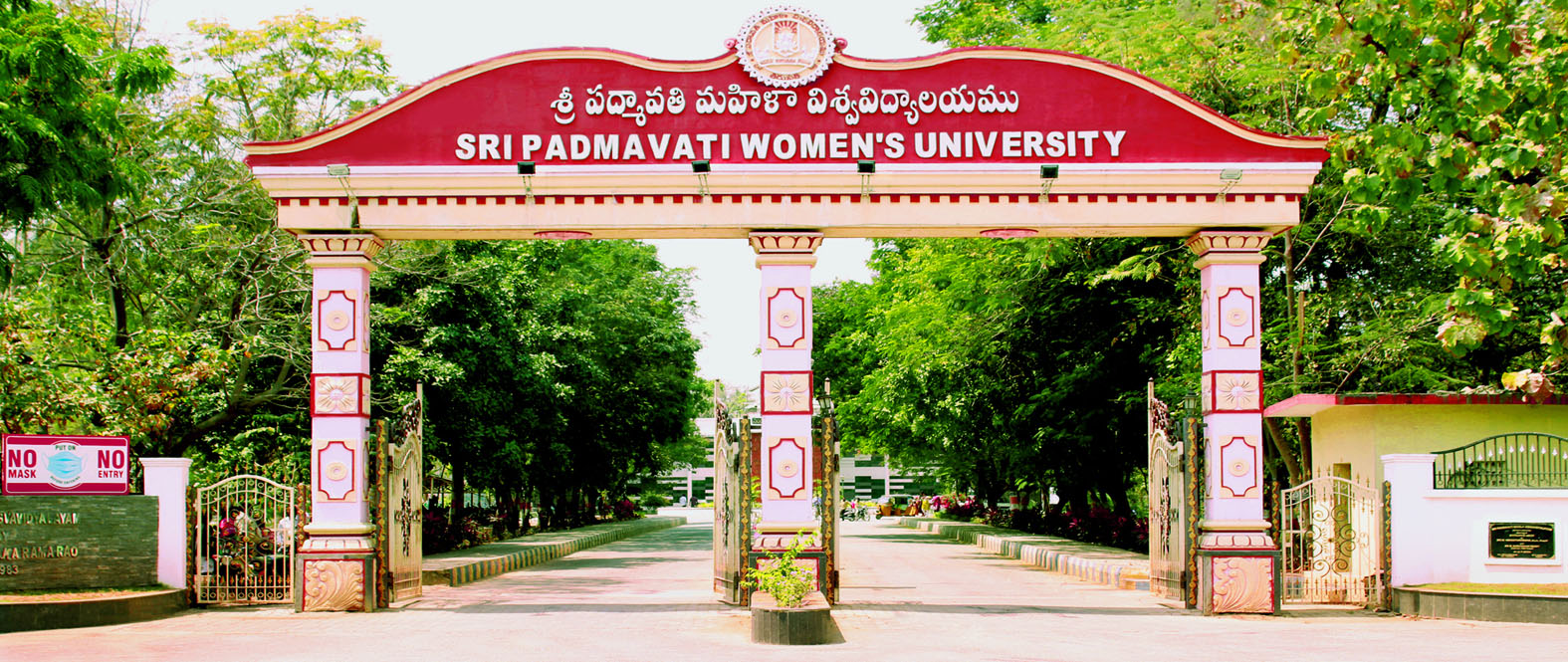
Sri Padmavati Mahila Visvavidyalayam Entrance

== Academics ==
Sri Padmavati Mahila Visvavidyalayam is a unitary university with 4 schools and 25 departments having 60 programme options: five postgraduate diploma, four undergraduate, 30 postgraduate, 21 Ph.D. programmes. Remedial teaching for the academically weaker students and the organisation of pre-examination coaching to backward community students are undertaken.

New features are courses that have a great demand in the job market such as MBA in Media Management, Integrated (five-year) course in Bio Technology, Bachelor of Physical Education and BioInformatics. The university also offers courses in Distance Education mode. It is the only state University in Andhra Pradesh having eight Incubation Centres. TBI and TOCIC rank among the top incubators in the country. These centres support entrepreneurs, especially women entrepreneurs in India.

== Campus ==
The campus of Sri Padmavati Mahila Visvavidyalayam covers 138 acres (56 hectares) in a semi-urban area at the foot of the sacred Tirumala Hills.

== Linkages ==
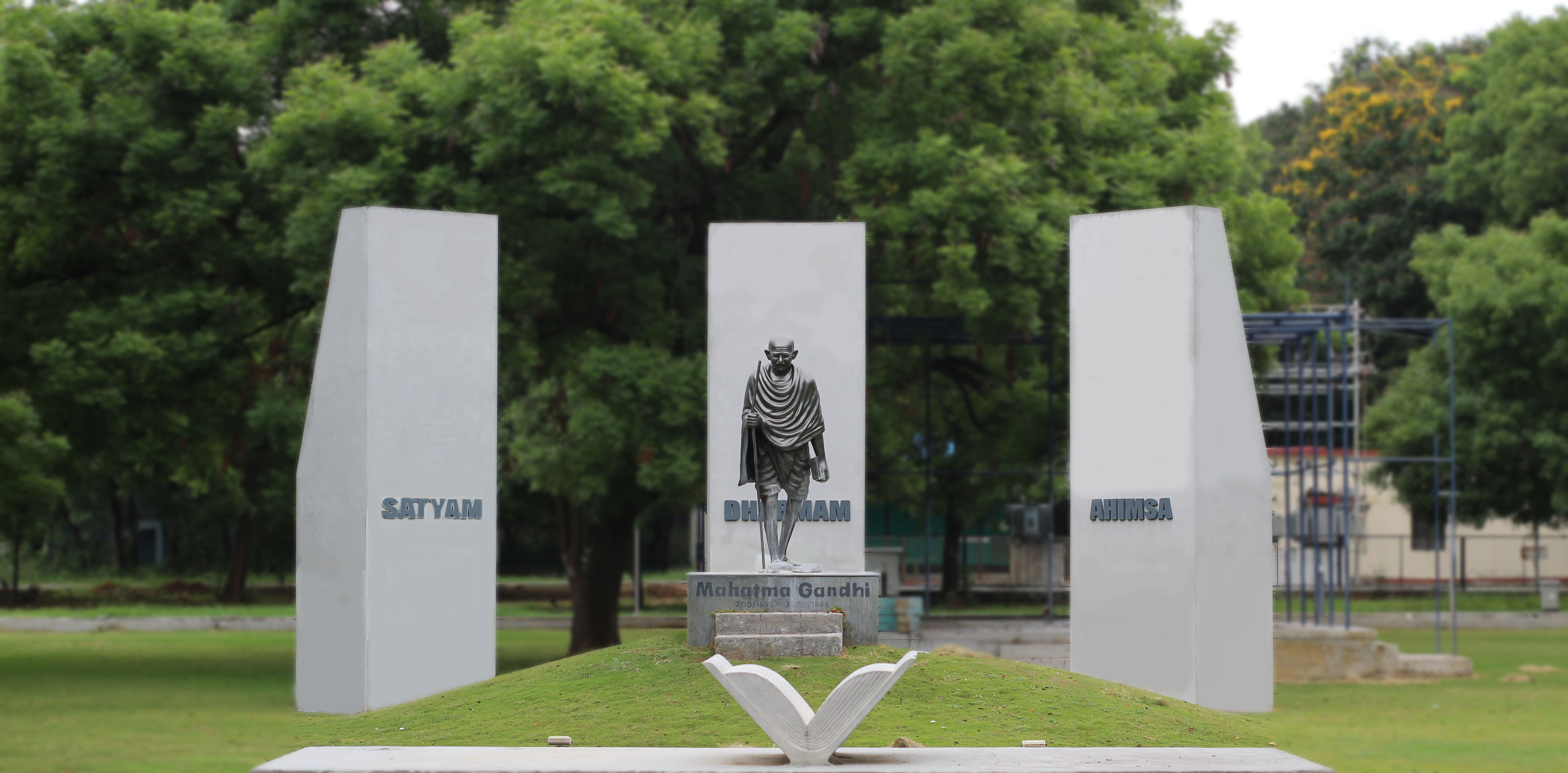
GANDHI SQUARE SPMVV

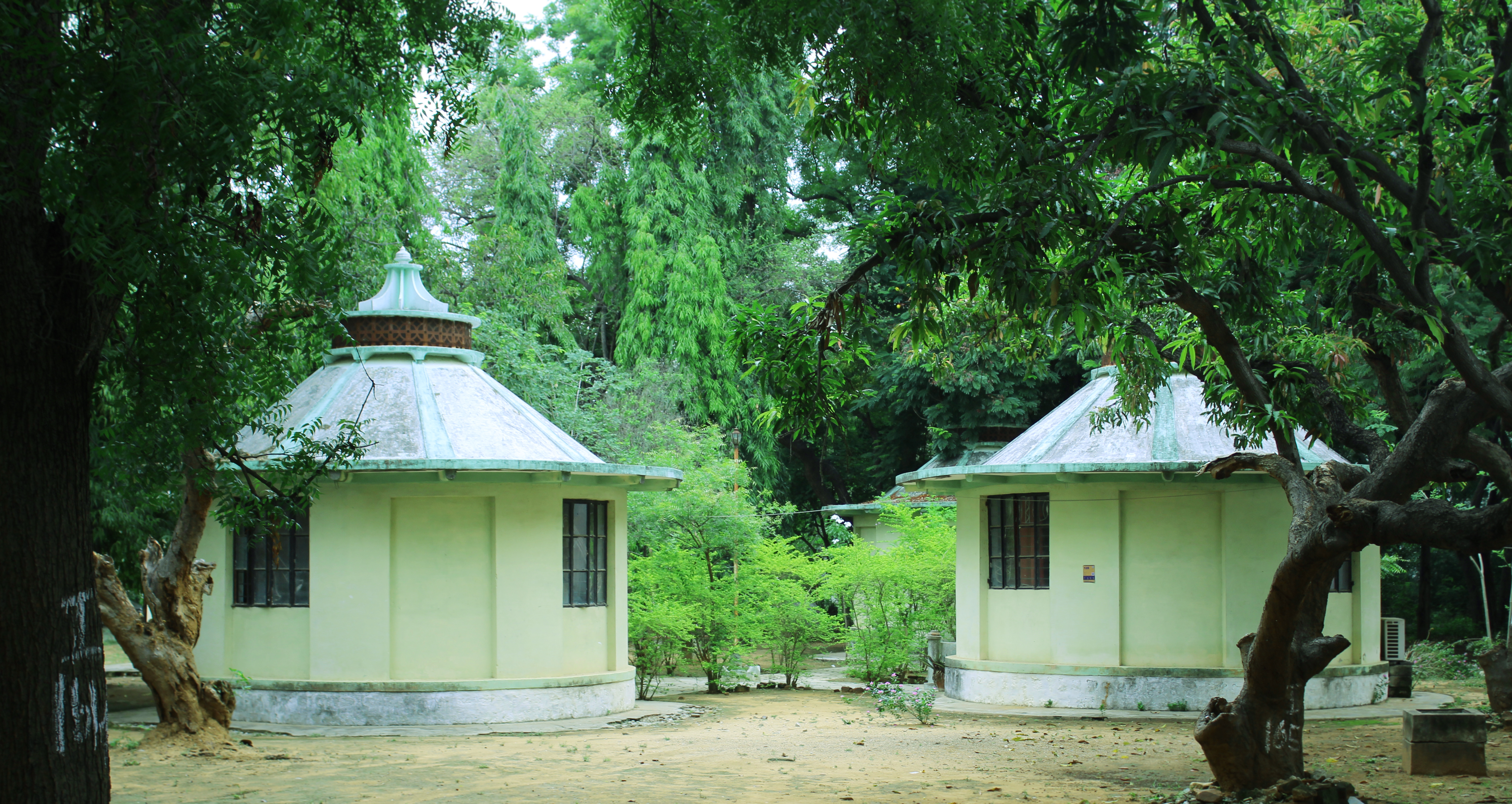
MUSIC MANDIR SPMVV

The university has linkages with foreign universities and national organisations. Some notable linkages are:

- Staff development programme with the Department of Education, Loughborough University, UK, with financial assistance from the Andhra Pradesh State Council of Higher Education and the British Council through the overseas Development Administrative Programme.
- Women Entrepreneurship Development with the Department of Business Management and Entrepreneurship, Université de Montréal, Canada.
- An exchange programme with the Chinese Government for the promotion of research in Sericulture.

== Rankings ==
The college was ranked 60th in India by the NIRF in the pharmacy ranking in 2024.

University rankings

Pharmacy – India
- NIRF (2024): 60
