= Marwari Yuva Manch =

All India Marwari Yuva Manch
- Logo of AIMYM
- Founded: 1977
- Founder: Pramod Saraf
- Type: Voluntary
- Location: 3432/13, Hasan Building, 2nd Floor Nicholson Road, Kashmere Gate, Delhi-110006
- Product: MANCH BASE: PUBLIC SERVICE; MANCH INSIGHT: SOCIAL REFORM; MANCH STRENGTH: INDIVIDUAL DEVELOPMENT; MANCH DESIRE:SOCIAL-DIGNITY AND SELF SECURITY; MANCH GOAL:NATIONAL DEVELOPMENT & UNITY
- Members: 55,000
- National President: Suresh M Jain
- Website: www.aimym.org

All India Marwari Yuva Manch (AIMYM) is one of the largest volunteer organisations of youth in India. Its primary goal is to support young people in contributing to their community and country. The AIMYM focuses on providing accessibility of assertive devices (e.g., prosthetic limbs and rehabilitative aids to the disabled.

Membership is open to men and women between the ages of 18 and 40, who must have adopted the lifestyle, language and culture of Rajasthan, Haryana, Malwa in Madhya Pradesh or nearby regions. They or their forefathers must identify themselves as Marwari. The first branch of the Marwari Yuva Manch opened on 10 October 1977 in Guwahati. The organization has since grown over 750 branches across both inside and outside of India, comprising almost 55,000 members.

== Public utility projects ==
- Ambulance service
- Blood donation service
- Cancer Detection
- Clean India Campaign
- Moksh Rath (Mortuary Van)

== Project highlights ==
AIMYM projects include:

- Calipers and artificial limbs – more than 1,00,000 limbs provided
- Ambulance services – Approximately 300 ambulances services running across the country
- Movement to Protect Girls – intensive campaign in Rajasthan and across India
- Clean Water Project, amrit dhara – Approximately 5,000 coolers and pyaus installed

== Disability in India ==
Most of the disabled people living in India are isolated and poor. Their disability, combined with poverty and lack of education, deny them access to rehabilitation services. The AIMYM developed an appropriate, simple, informal and humane camp approach under which artificial limbs, calipers, and other aids are provided easily and free of cost at the camp site. The AIMYM organizes a large number of camps every year in various parts of the country where artificial limbs, (Jaipur prostheses), polio calipers, etc. are produced and provided on the spot.

== Cancer Detection ==
Marwari Yuva Manch operates a Mobile Cancer Van that provides diagnostic services. The vehicle travels to various locations to provide screenings using medical equipment. These screenings are intended to detect cancer and allow for medical intervention.

== Clean India campaign ==
Marwari Yuva Manch joined the nation in Swachh Bharat Abhiyan. On 11 January 2015 around 1,11,111 volunteers joined the campaign across the nation.

== Incumbency Of President ==
Year	Name
1985–1988	Pramod Saraf
1988–1991	Arun Kumar Bajaj
1991–1994	Om Prakash Agarwal
1994–1996	Pawan Sikaria
1998–2000	CA Pramod Shah
2000–2002	Anil Jaina
2002–2004	Balram Sultania
2006–2008	Anil K Jajodia
2008–2011	Jitendra Kumar Gupta
2011–2014	Lalit Sakalchand Gandhi
2014–2018	Ravi Agrawal
2018–2021	Amit Agrawal
2021–2023	Kapil Lakhotia
2023–2025	Surender Bhatter
2025–2027	Suresh M Jain

== State presidents ==
- Mukesh Bothra – Delhi
- Manish Agrawal – Utkal
- Raj Chaudhary – Purbottar- Entire Northeast
- Sumit Jindal – West Bengal Sikkim
- Ashwini Khator – Bihar
- Vishal Padia – Jharkhand
- Anurag Chandwasia – Uttar Pradesh
- DR KAJAL VERMA – Rajasthan
- Sunil Agarwal (Boby) – Chhattisgarh
- Manish Nahar – Andhra Pradesh/Telangana
- Ramkishore Verma – Maharashtra
- Rajendra Agerwal – Gujarat
- Ashok Kathariya- Karnataka
- Anand Singhvi – Tamil Nadu
- Mayank Agarwal- Madhya Pradesh
- Parag Agrawal- Odisha
