= Indian Society for Cultural Co-operation and Friendship =

- Abbreviation: ISCUF
- Formation: 21 June 1941 (85 years ago)
- Headquarters: First Floor (Rear Portion) 7, Tansen Marg, Bangali Market, New Delhi - 110 001, India
- Location: India
- General Secretary: Bijay Kumar Padhihari

The Indian Society for Cultural Co-operation and Friendship (ISCUF) is an organization in India promoting people-to-people cultural understanding and friendship. The organization was initially known as the Friends of the Soviet Union and, later, the Indo-Soviet Cultural Society (ISCUS).

The Friends of the Soviet Union was founded in West Bengal on 22 June 1941, the same day as Germany attacked the Soviet Union. An Organisation Committee was formed with Bhupendra Nath Dutta (Swami Vivekananda's younger brother) as the chairman, and, Hiren Mukherjee and S.K. Acharya as secretaries. The poet Rabindranath Tagore was the patron of the Organisation Committee. Bhupesh Gupta and Jyoti Basu were active in mobilizing support for the organization. A second conference of the organisation was held in April 1944, presided by Nellie Sengupta. At a convention held in the Convocation Hall of Bombay University June 3–4, 1944 the organisation became the 'All India Friends of the Soviet Union'. Some 2,000 people took part in the event, out of whom a hundred were delegates. In 1944 the organization began publishing Indo-Soviet Journal from Bombay. The organization developed close collaboration with its Soviet counterpart VOKS, and conducted various cultural activities. The organization promoted the Asian Relations Conference of 1946, and participated in the event.

On 12 March 1952, the organization was reconstituted as ISCUS at a convention at Sunderbhai Hall in Bombay, with Dr. A.V. Baliga as the new chairman of the ISCUS National Council. Uttar Pradesh chapter of the society was organised and functioned under the guidance of Nirmal Chandra Chaturvedi, MLC and a prominent Leader of the Congress party.

ISCUS transformed into ISCUF in 1993, following the dissolution of the Soviet Union. In 2017 ISCUF signed a Memorandum of Understanding with the Vietnam Union of Friendship Organizations (VUFO), outlining cooperation for the period 2017–2022. In December 2018 ISCUF held its 22nd National Conference in Coimbatore, with participation from the embassies of Cuba, Russia and Vietnam.
