= Halder =

Halder may refer to:

== People ==
- Baby Halder (born 1973), Indian author
- Bapi Halder, Indian politician
- Dipak Kumar Halder (born 1966), Indian politician
- Franz Halder (1884-1972), German general in World War II
- Gebhard Halder (1942-2024), Austrian farmer and politician
- Goutam Halder (born 1963), Indian theatre actor
- Jogaranjan Halder, Indian politician
- Michelle Halder (born 1999), German racing driver
- Mike Halder (born 1996), German racing driver
- Pannalal Halder, Indian politician
- Priyanka Halder (born 1991), Indian actress
- Pronay Halder (born 1993), Indian footballer
- Veronika Halder (born 1980), Austrian luger
- Wally Halder (1925-1994), Canadian ice hockey player
- Willi Halder (1958-2025), German politician
- Haldar, sometimes spelt Halder, Bengali surname

== Places ==
India

- Halder Para, Gangarampur, a neighbourhood

Netherlands

- Halder (Netherlands), a hamlet

United States

- Halder, Wisconsin, an unincorporated community
