= Haldar =

- Language: Bengali

Origin
- Origin: Indian
- Meaning: Sanskrit halādhāra (हलाधारा)
- Region of origin: Bengal

Other names
- Alternative spelling: Halder, Haldhar, Haldher, Haaldaar, Haldaar, Haaldar
- Cognates: Sikdar, Tarafdar, Talukdar, Dastidar
- Related names: Chowdhury, Sarkar, Roy
- Primarily concentrated in West Bengal (94%) and Bangladesh (4%); globally found in 42+ countries, ranked 1,421st worldwide. Relatively uncommon outside Bengal.

Haldar or Halder (Bengali: হালদার) is a native Bengali surname of Bengal, historically associated with wealthy landlords and crop tax managers within the zamindari system, and is found among the Bengali people of West Bengal, Assam, Tripura, and Bangladesh.

== Origin ==
The surname derives from the Sanskrit term halādhāra (हलाधारा), meaning "one who holds a plow" — an epithet of the god Balarama, brother of Krishna, who is said to have used a weapon shaped like a plowshare.

Historically, Haldar was an honorific title bestowed upon large landowners (zamindars) and crop tax managers within Bengal's zamindari system. Like other "-dar" suffix surnames such as Sikdar, Tarafdar, and Talukdar, the title originated during the Persianate Age in the Bengal delta, when Persian-influenced administrative titles were widely adopted across Bengal. Because the title was conferred based on land and administrative position rather than caste or religion, it came to be used across communities of all faiths and social backgrounds in Bengal.

== Communities ==
The surname is not tied to any single caste or religion, and is found across nearly all communities in Bengal. Among Bengali Hindus, it is found in castes including Brahmin, Kayastha, Baidya, Bhumihar, Mahishya, Sadgop, Gandhabanik, Karmakar, Namasudra, Lodha, Poundra, Rajbongshi, among others. The surname is also found among Bengali Muslims, whose ancestors held the Haldar title as landowners and crop tax managers within the zamindari system, retaining it as a hereditary surname. Additionally, the surname is found among Bengali Christians — some Haldar families converted to Christianity through the influence of Christian missionaries during the colonial period while retaining their Bengali surname, and some Bengali Christians independently adopted the Haldar surname. Bengali Buddhist communities bearing the Haldar surname are also found in West Bengal and Bangladesh, with Bengal's Buddhist heritage rooted in the Pala Empire (750–1161 CE).

== Notable people ==
- Asit Kumar Haldar (1890–1964), Indian painter
- Baby Halder (born 1973), Indian author
- Bapi Halder, Indian politician and Member of Parliament
- Debshankar Haldar (born 1965), Indian actor
- Dipak Kumar Halder (born 1966), Indian politician
- Franz Halder (1884–1972), German general
- Ganesh Chandra Haldar, Bangladeshi politician
- Gobinda Halder (1930–2015), Bengali lyricist and poet
- Goutam Halder (born 1963), Indian theatre actor
- Haldar Mohammad Abdul Gaffar (1945–2020), Bangladeshi lieutenant colonel and politician
- Harke Haldar (born 1981), Nepali comedian and actor
- Indrani Haldar (born 1971), Indian actress
- Jogaranjan Halder, Indian politician
- Lushlife (born Raj Haldar), American rapper and producer
- Madhurjya Haldar (born 1934), Indian politician
- Mike Halder (born 1996), German racing driver
- Nabadwip Haldar, Indian actor and comedian
- P. C. Haldar, 20th Director of Intelligence Bureau of India
- Pannalal Halder, Indian politician
- Prashanta Kumar Halder, Bangladeshi-Canadian banker
- Priyanka Halder (born 1991), Indian actress
- Pronay Halder (born 1993), Indian footballer
- Ram Sankar Halder, Indian politician
- Rimpa Haldar (born 2005), Indian professional footballer
- Sucharu Ranjan Haldar (born 1940), Indian politician
- Sudhangshu Shekhar Haldar (died 2004), Bangladeshi politician
- Trinetra Haldar Gummaraju (born 1997), Indian actress and medical doctor
- Wally Halder (1925–1994), Canadian ice hockey player

== See also ==
- Halfar
- Howlader

== Bibliography ==
- Mookerjee, S. (1959). "Bengalee Surnames" (PDF). Annals of Library and Information Studies. 6 (3). University of Calcutta: 81–91.
- Bhaumik, Khagendra Nath (1982). Padabīra utpatti o kramabikāśera itihāsa (in Bengali). Mitraloka. pp. Division D, 34.
- Risley, H.H. (1891). The Tribes and Castes of Bengal. Calcutta: Bengal Secretariat Press.
