= Left Front (West Bengal) =

Political coalition in India

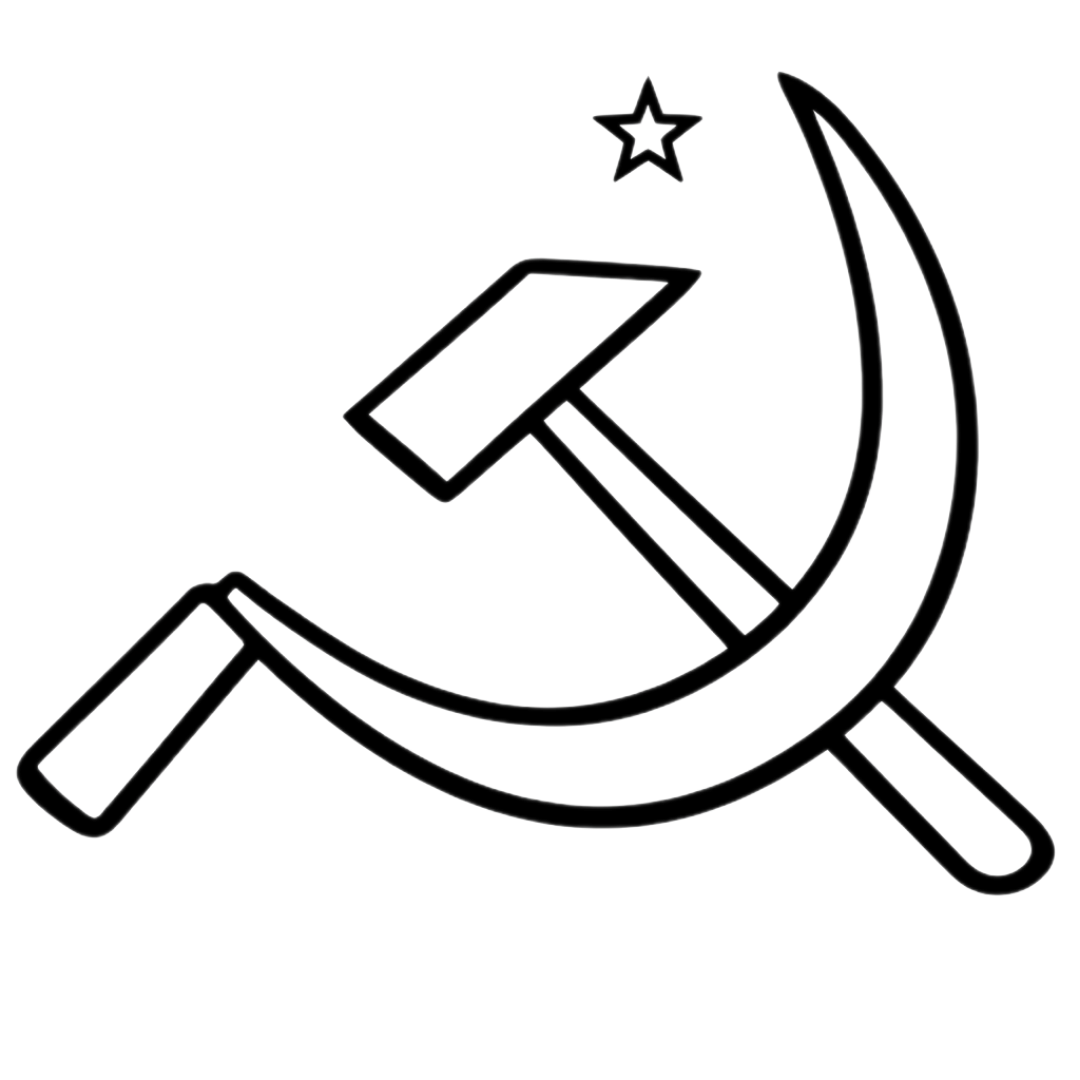
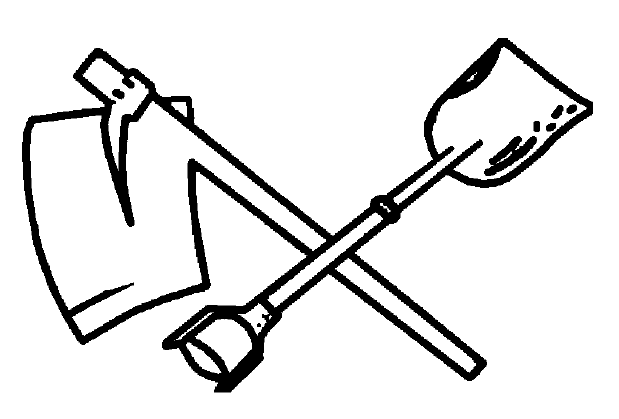
- বামফ্রন্ট; Left Front
- Abbreviation: LF
- Chairman: Biman Bose
- Founders: Jyoti Basu
- Founded: 1977; 49 years ago
- Ideology: Marxism-Leninism; Socialism; Secularism; Revolutionary patriotism Anti-imperialism
- Political position: Left-wing
- Regional affiliation: Left Front+
- Colours: Red
- Lok Sabha: 0 / 42
- Rajya Sabha: 0 / 16
- West Bengal Legislative Assembly: 1 / 294
- Gram Panchayats: 3,242 / 63,229
- Panchayat Samitis: 196 / 9,730
- Zilla Parishads: 2 / 928
- Municipalities: 1 / 108

Website
- ∆

The Left Front (Bamfront) is an alliance of left-wing political parties in the Indian state of West Bengal. It was formed in January 1977 led by the Communist Party of India (Marxist) with other founding parties being the All India Forward Bloc, the Revolutionary Socialist Party, the Marxist Forward Bloc, the Revolutionary Communist Party of India and the Biplobi Bangla Congress. Other parties joined in later years, most notably the Communist Party of India.

The Left Front ruled the state of West Bengal for 34 years in seven consecutive terms 1977–2011, five with Jyoti Basu as Chief Minister and two under Buddhadev Bhattacharya. The CPI(M) is the dominant force in the alliance. In the 2011 West Bengal Legislative Assembly election the Left Front failed to gain a majority of seats and left office. As of 2026 Biman Bose is the Chairman of the West Bengal Left Front Committee.

== History ==
=== Left-Janata alliance in 1977 Lok Sabha election ===
The Left Front has its roots in various past platforms of collaboration of the West Bengal left parties and anti-Indian National Congress forces. Such examples were the United Left Front, the People's United Left Front and the United Front that governed West Bengal 1967–1971. However, ahead of the March 1977 Lok Sabha election the left parties under the leadership of CPI(M) decided to form an alliance just amongst themselves, based on past negative experiences in collaboration with centrist anti-Congress forces.

The Left Front was set up when the repressive climate of the Emergency was finally relaxed in January 1977. The six founding parties of the Left Front, i.e. the CPI(M), the All India Forward Bloc, the Revolutionary Socialist Party, the Marxist Forward Bloc, the Revolutionary Communist Party of India and the Biplabi Bangla Congress, articulated a common programme. The Left Front contested the Lok Sabha election in an electoral understanding together with the Janata Party. The Workers Party of India applied for inclusion into the Left Front, but was denied entry.

In the 1977 Lok Sabha election the Left Front contested 26 out of the 42 West Bengal Lok Sabha constituencies; CPI(M) fielded candidates for 20 seats, RSP 3 seats and AIFB 3 seats. CPI(M) won 17 seats, AIFB 3 seats and RSP 3 seats. The combined Left Front vote in West Bengal reached 5,049,077 votes (33.4% of the votes cast in the state).

=== Left victory in 1977 assembly polls ===
Ahead of the subsequent June 1977 West Bengal Legislative Assembly elections seat-sharing talks between the Left Front and the Janata Party broke down. The Left Front had offered the Janata Party 52% of the seats and the post as Chief Minister to JP leader Prafulla Chandra Sen, but JP did not accept anything less than 56% of the seats. The Left Front thus opted to contest the elections on its own. It issued a 36-point manifesto ahead of the polls. The Left Front manifesto has similarities with the past 32-point United Front manifesto.

The seat-sharing within the Left Front was based on the 'Promode Formula', named after the CPI(M) State Committee Secretary Promode Dasgupta. Under the Promode Formula the party with the highest share of votes in a constituency would continue to field candidates there, under its own election symbol and manifesto.

CPI(M) contested 224 seats, AIFB 36, RSP 23, MFB 3, RCPI 4 and BBC 2. There was also a Left Front-supported independent candidate in the Chakdaha seat.

The Left Front won the election, winning 231 out of the 294 seats. CPI(M) won 178 seats, AIFB 25, RSP 20, MFB 3, RCPI 3 and 1 independent. AIFB and RSP won significant chunks of seats in northern Bengal. The combined Left Front vote was 6,568,999 votes (45.8% of the votes cast in the state). The electoral result came as a surprise to the Left Front itself, as it had offered 52% of the seats in the pre-electoral seat-sharing talks with the Janata Party.

=== First Left Front government ===
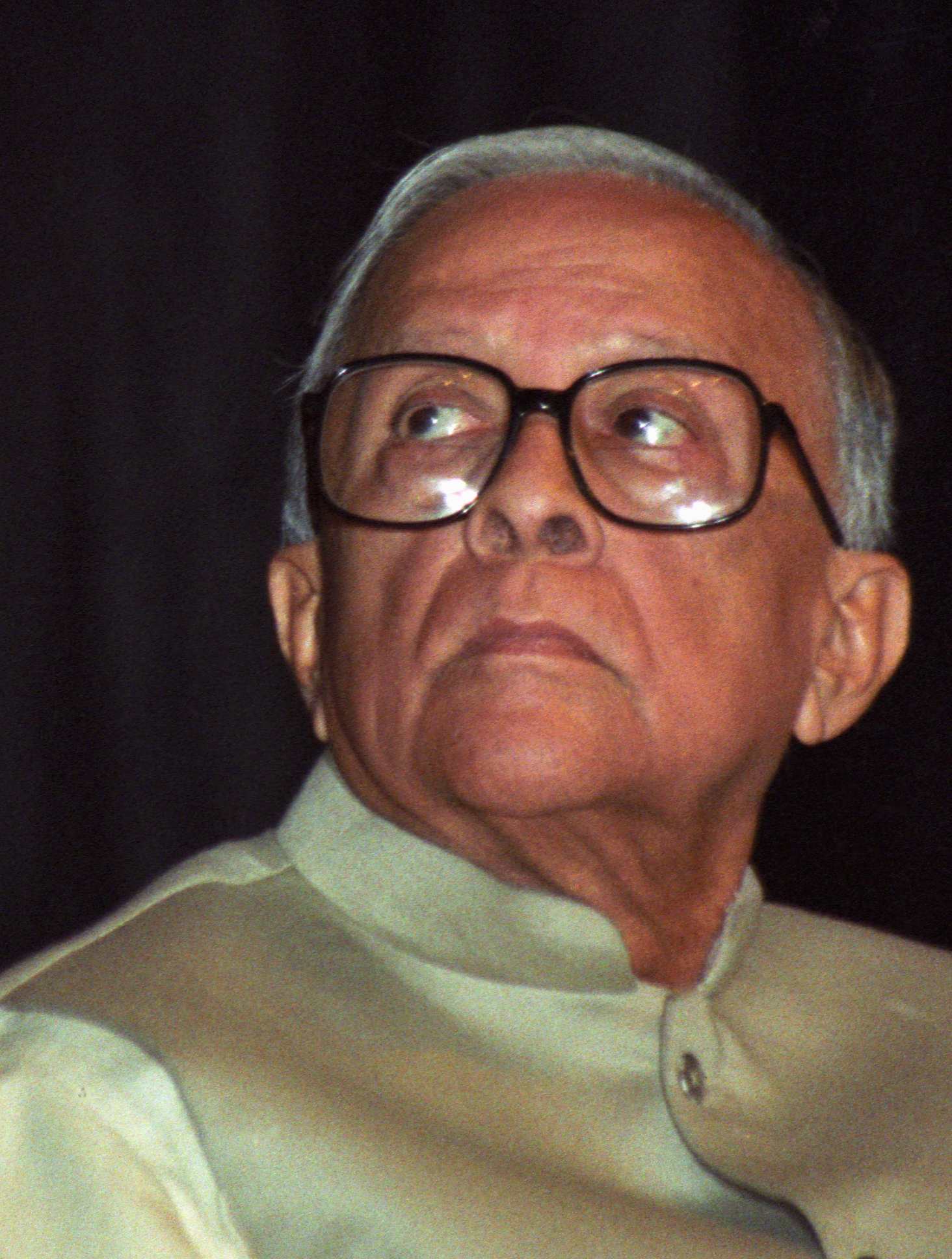
Jyoti Basu
Longest serving Chief Minister of West Bengal

On 21 June 1977 the Left Front formed a government with Jyoti Basu as its Chief Minister. The first cabinet meeting of the Left Front government ordered the release of political prisoners.

The Socialist Party joined the Left Front after the 1977 elections. Prior to the arrival of the Left Front government, the political environment of West Bengal was chaotic, and the new cabinet struggled to establish order. The first years of governance was shaky, as the CPI(M) struggled with the notion of managing a communist government within a capitalist framework. Minor coalition partners expressed concern over inviting multinational corporations to invest in West Bengal.

==== Operation Barga and panchayat polls ====
In the initial phase of Left Front governance, two key priorities were land reform and decentralisation of administration. On 29 September 1977 the West Bengal Land (Amendment) Bill was passed. Through Operation Barga was done before in 1967 under the leadership of Hare Krishna Konar and Benoy Choudhury, in which share-croppers were given inheritable rights on lands they tilled, 1.1 million acres of land was distributed amongst 1.4 million share-croppers. On 4 June 1978 three-tier panchayat local bodies were elected across the state, elections in which the Left Front won a landslide victory. Some 800,000 acres of land were distributed to 1.5 million heads of households between 1978 and 1982. The Left Front government was also credited with coping with the refugee situation created by the Bangladesh Liberation War and severe floods.

Seeing distribution of central government funds as unjust and politicized, the Left Front government began measures to pressure the central government to change its approach towards the state governments. These movements eventually resulted in the Sarkaria Commission.

==== 1980 Lok Sabha election ====
Ahead of the 1980 Lok Sabha election the Left Front and the Communist Party of India entered into a seat-sharing agreement. CPI(M) contested 31 seats, RSP 4 seats, AIFB 4 seats and CPI 3 seats. CPI(M) won 28 seats, CPI 3 seats, AIFB 3 seats and RSP 4 seats. The combined Left Front-CPI vote in West Bengal reached 11,086,354 votes (52.7% of the votes cast in the state).

On 27 May 1980 the Left Front cancelled the past Code of Conduct for state government employees, which had limited the right to strike.

=== Second Left Front government ===
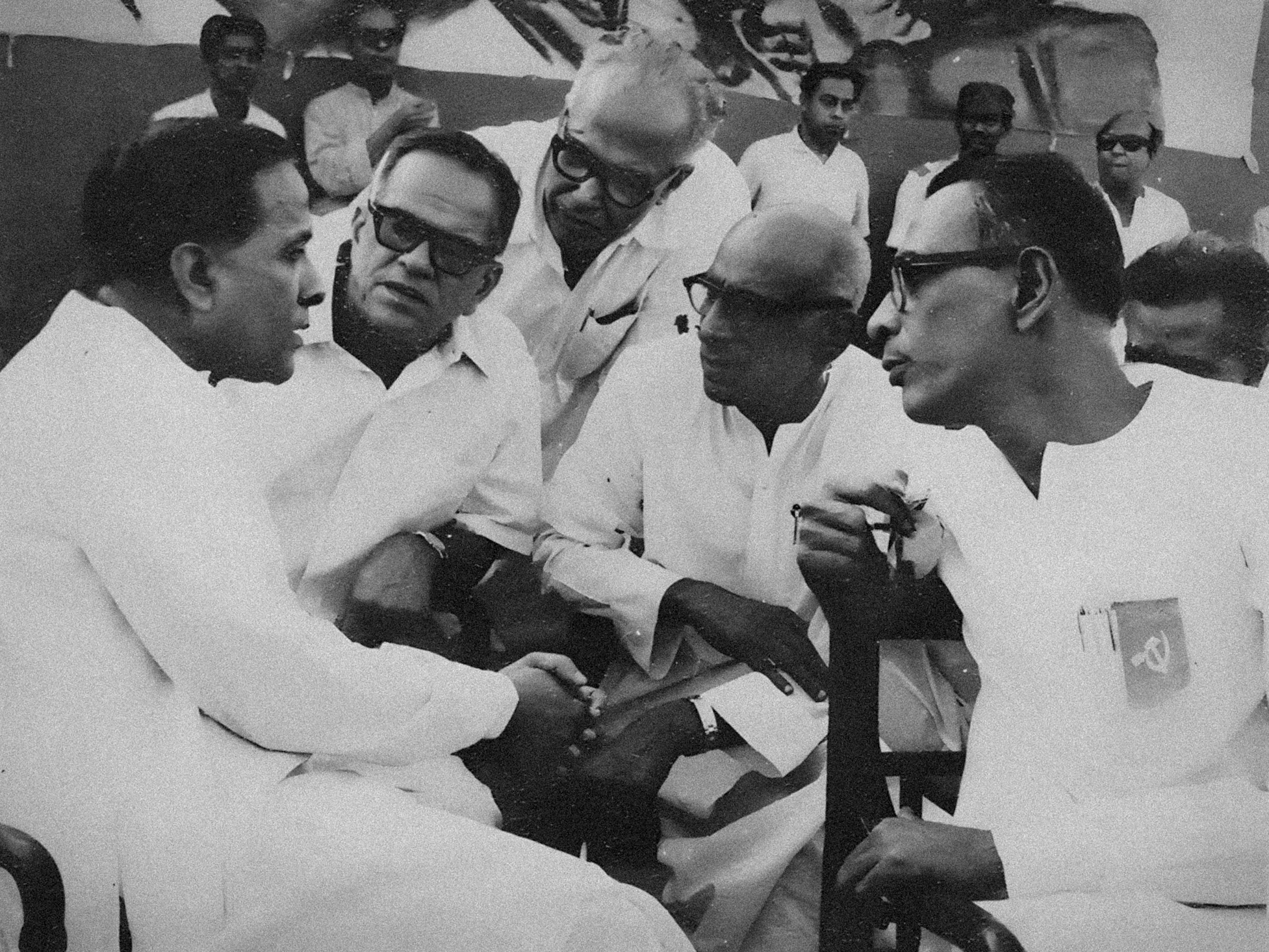
Basu, Ranadive, Mukherjee, Basavapunnaiah, and Konar in the conference of AIKS held in Barsul, West Bengal in 1969

==== Three new members ====
In 1982 the Left Front acquired three new members, CPI joined the Left Front ahead of the 1982 West Bengal Legislative Assembly elections and the Socialist Party was split into the Democratic Socialist Party (Prabodh Chandra) and the West Bengal Socialist Party (both DSP and WBSP became Left Front member parties). Some of the older, smaller Left Front constituents were uncomfortable with the expansion of the alliance, claiming that CPI(M) was diluting it politically. There were also disagreements on distribution of ministerial portfolios after the expansion of the alliance.

==== 1982 assembly election ====
CPI(M) contested 209 seats in the assembly election, CPI 12 seats, AIFB 34 seats and RSP 23 seats. 16 candidates were fielded by the remainder of Left Front partners (RCPI, WBSP, DSP, BBC, MFB) and contested as independents.

The Left Front won 238 out of 294 seats in the election. CPI(M) won 174 seats, CPI 7 seats, AIFB 28 seats, RSP 19 seats, WBSP 4 seats, DSP 2 seats, RCPI 2 seats, MFB 2 seats. The combined Left Front vote was 11,869,003 votes (52.7% of the votes cast in the state). The incumbent Food Minister, the RCPI leader Sudhindranath Kumar, lost his seat. Kumar was proposed as a candidate for a Rajya Sabha seat on behalf of the Left Front in 1984, but that move did not go down well with RSP and AIFB.

Jyoti Basu and five cabinet minister were sworn in on 27 May 1982. Another 15 cabinet ministers and 22 Ministers of State were sworn in on 2 June 1982.

==== 1984 Lok Sabha election ====
In the 1984 Lok Sabha election, CPI(M) contested 31 seats, RSP 4 seats, AIFB 4 seats and CPI 3 seats. CPI(M) won 18 seats, CPI 3 seats, AIFB 2 seats and RSP 3 seats. The Left Front vote in West Bengal reached 12,296,816 votes (47.6% of the votes cast in the state).

==== Calcutta Municipal Corporation polls ====
On 30 June 1985, the first Calcutta Municipal Corporation elections were held under the Left Front rule, an election that the alliance won.

=== Third Left Front government ===
==== 1987 assembly election ====
In the 1987 West Bengal Legislative Assembly election the Left Front increased its share of seats to 251. CPI(M) had contested 213 seats, CPI 12 seats, AIFB 34 seats and RSP 23 seats. 12 candidates were fielded by smaller Left Front partners on independent tickets.

CPI(M) won 187 seats, CPI 11 seats, AIFB 26 seats, RSP 18 seats, WBSP 4 seats, MFB 2 seats, DSP 2 seats and RCPI 1 seat. The Left Front vote stood at 13,924,806 (53%).

==== 1989 Lok Sabha election ====
In the 1989 Lok Sabha election, CPI(M) contested 31 seats, RSP 4 seats, CPI 3 seats and AIFB 3 seats. In Calcutta Northwest the Left Front supported a Janata Dal candidates who failed to get elected. CPI(M) won 27 seats, CPI 3 seats, AIFB 3 seats and RSP 4 seats. The Left Front vote in West Bengal, including the votes for the JD candidate, reached 16,284,415 votes (50.6% of the votes cast in the state).

=== Fourth Left Front government ===
==== 1991 assembly election ====
In the 1991 West Bengal Legislative Assembly election the Left Front won 244 seats. CPI(M) had fielded 205 candidates (excluding minor parties contesting on CPI(M) tickets), CPI 11, AIFB 34, RSP 23, MFB 2, RCPI 2, DSP 2, WBSP 4 and BBC 1. Several leaders of minor Left Front parties contested on the CPI(M) symbol, such as Kiranmoy Nanda (WBSP), Gouranga Samanta (BBC) and Prabodh Chandra Sinha (DSP). However, DSP also one candidate with its own symbol in Pingla. MFB fielded 1 candidate on an independent ticket and 1 candidate on CPI(M) ticket. The Left Front supported Janata Dal candidates in 8 constituencies, mainly in and around Calcutta, as well as 1 candidate of the All India Gorkha League and 1 candidate of the Communist Revolutionary League of India.

CPI(M) won 182 seats, CPI 6 seats, AIFB 29 seats, RSP 18 seats, WBSP 4, seats, DSP 2 seats, RCPI 1 seat, MFB 2 seats and DSP 1 seat (on its own symbol). One JD candidate won. The combined vote for Left Front and allies stood at 15,090,595 (48.92% of the votes cast in the state).

==== 1991 Lok Sabha election ====
In the 1991 Lok Sabha election, CPI(M) contested 30 seats, RSP 4 seats, CPI 3 seats and AIFB 3 seats. In Calcutta Northwest and Calcutta Northeast the Left Front supported a Janata Dal candidates who failed to get elected. CPI(M) won 27 seats, CPI 3 seats, AIFB 3 seats and RSP 4 seats. The Left Front vote in West Bengal, including the votes for the JD candidates, reached 14,955,151 votes (47.1% of the votes cast in the state).

In 1995 the Communist Revolutionary League of India (CRLI) of Ashim Chatterjee joined the Left Front. Chatterjee, a former Naxalite student leader, had unsuccessfully contested the 1991 assembly election as a CPI(M)-supported candidate.

=== Fifth Left Front government ===
==== WBSP-SP merger ====
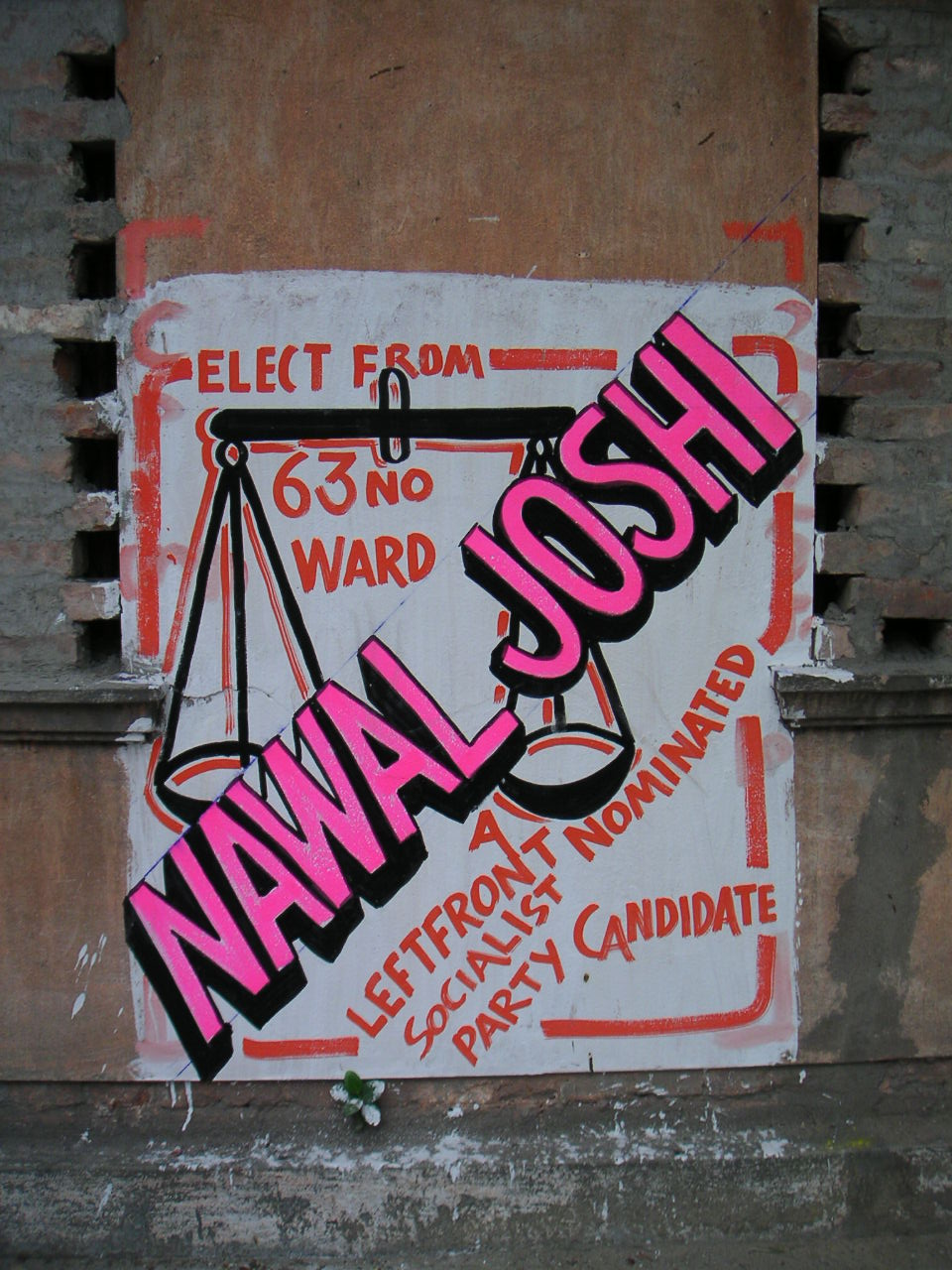
Mural in favour of WBSP local body candidate in Kolkata

Ahead of the 1996 West Bengal Legislative Assembly election, WBSP had merged into the Samajwadi Party which became a member of the Left Front.

==== 1996 assembly election ====
CPI(M) fielded 217 candidates in the assembly election, CPI 12, AIFB 34, RSP 23, RCPI 2 and BBC 1 candidate on an independent ticket. DSP, WBSP and MFB candidates contested on CPI(M) tickets. In 5 seats the Left Front supported JD candidates, mainly in the Calcutta area.

The Left Front won 203 out of 294 seats, the first major electoral set-back since its foundation. CPI(M) won 157 seats (including minor parties on its tickets), CPI 6, AFB 21, RSP 18 and BBC 1. The electoral losses were primarily felt in Calcutta and the industrial areas, and nine incumbent Left Front ministers failed to get re-elected. All JD candidates finished in second place and RCPI lost its representation in the assembly. However, in terms of votes the Left Front and the five JD candidates got 18,143,795 votes (49.3%). Jyoti Basu's fifth Left Front government was sworn in, with 48 ministers representing all 13 districts of the state.

==== United Front era (1996–1999) ====
In the 1996 Lok Sabha election, CPI(M) contested 31 seats, RSP 4 seats, CPI 3 seats and AIFB 3 seats. In Calcutta Northwest the Left Front supported a Janata Dal candidate who failed to get elected. CPI(M) won 23 seats, CPI 3 seats, AIFB 3 seats and RSP 4 seats. The Left Front vote in West Bengal, including the votes for the JD candidate, reached 18,011,700 votes (47.8% of the votes cast in the state). In the 1998 Lok Sabha election, CPI(M) contested 32 seats, RSP 4 seats, CPI 3 seats and AIFB 3 seats. The list of candidates was announced at a press conference on 6 January 1998. The Left Front had been able to reach consensus on its candidates well before the other major parties, and subsequently the CPI(M) election campaign came off to an early start.

A mammoth United Front (the national alliance backed by the left at the time) election meeting was held in Calcutta on 31 January 1998 with Jyoti Basu as the main speaker. Basu undertook a tour of all West Bengal districts to campaign for the Left Front candidates.

The CPI(M) candidates included 18 incumbent Lok Sabha MPs, whereas the CPI and RSP fielded all of their incumbent MPs. The Left Front fielded the ex-mayor and 4-term minister Prasanta Sur to contest against Trinamool Congress leader Mamata Banerjee for the Calcutta South seat, but Sur failed to defeat Banerjee. The Left Front also fielded Prasanta Chatterjee, the sitting mayor of Calcutta for the Calcutta Northeast seat as well as fielding sitting Howrah mayor Swadesh Chakravarty against the Congress(I) MP Priya Ranjan Dasmunsi. AIFB fielded a new candidate in Barasat, as the Barasat MP Chitta Basu had died.

All in all, CPI(M) won 24 seats, CPI 3 seats, AIFB 2 seats and RSP 4 seats. AIFB lost the Barasat seat to Trinamool Congress. The Left Front vote in West Bengal reached 17,101,211 votes (46% of the votes cast in the state).

Ahead of the 1999 Lok Sabha election, the Left Front released its list of candidates on 30 July 1999; CPI(M) contested 32 seats, RSP 4 seats, CPI 3 seats and AIFB 3 seats. The Left Front fielded nine new candidates; two sitting CPI(M) MPs were replaced (Ananda Pathak from Darjeeling and Ajoy Mukherjee from Krishnanagar). CPI(M) fielded new faces in five Calcutta constituencies. AIFB fielded a new candidate in Barasat. RSP and CPI retained all their sitting parliamentarians as candidates for re-election.

CPI(M) won 21 seats, CPI 3 seats, AIFB 2 seats and RSP 3 seats. The Left Front vote in West Bengal reached 16,494,424 votes (46.1% of the votes cast in the state).

==== CRLI out, WBSP reconstituted ====
CRLI left the Left Front in 2000 in the wake of the Saifuddin Choudhury's expulsion from CPI(M). In 2000, the WBSP was reconstituted after Amar Singh took over the Samajwadi Party and Kiranmoy Nanda (Fisheries Minister of Left Front government 1982–2011) broke away.

==== Panskura by-election ====
In 2000 a by-election was called for the Panskura Lok Sabha seat as the sitting CPI MP Geeta Mukherjee died. Mukherjee had held the seat since 1980. The by-election, as it occurred just months before the 2001 West Bengal Legislative Assembly election, was attached crucial importance. Jyoti Basu, former Prime Minister V.P. Singh and CPI leader A.B. Bardhan campaigned for the Left Front candidate whilst Mamata Banerjee campaigned for the Trinamool Congress candidate. The defeat of the Left Front candidate (former Rajya Saha MP Gurudas Dasgupta of CPI) by the Trinamool Congress candidate was a major jolt to the alliance. On 27 October 2000 Basu, aged 86, was given permission by the CPI(M) leadership to resign as Chief Minister. Buddhadev Bhattacharya was sworn in as new Chief Minister on 6 November 2000.

=== Sixth Left Front government ===
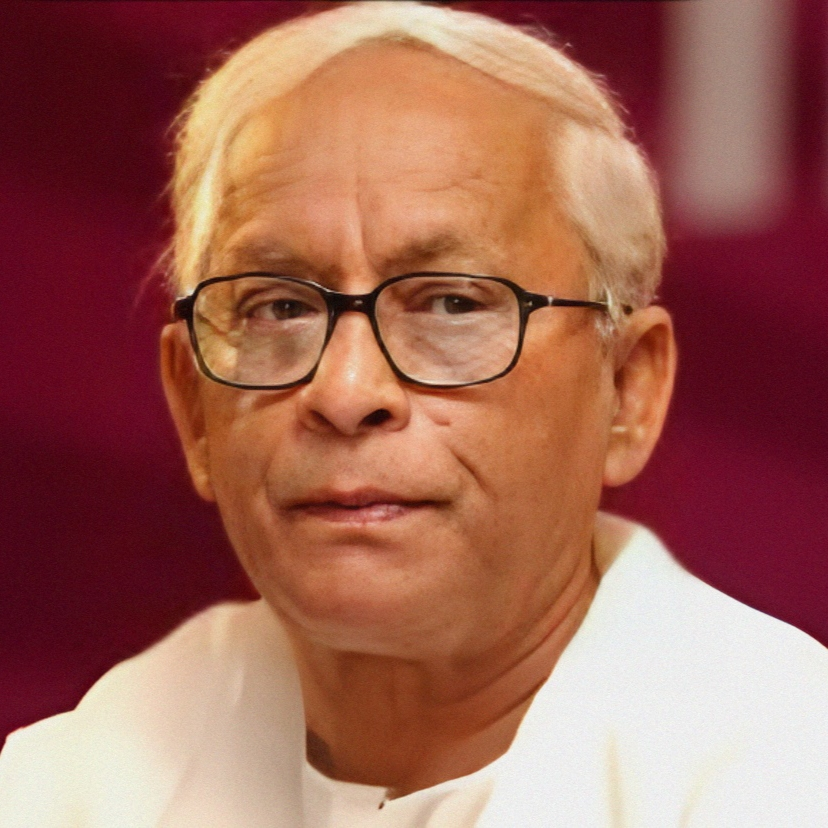
Buddhadeb Bhattacharjee
Chief Minister of West Bengal, 2000–2011

==== 2001 assembly election ====
In the 2001 West Bengal Legislative Assembly election the Left Front won 199 out of 294 seats, having received 17,912,669 votes along with its RJD and JD(S) allies (49% of the votes in the state). For the first time since 1977 CPI(M) did not hold an absolute majority of its own in the assembly.

CPI(M) had fielded 210 candidates, CPI 13, AIFB 34, RSP 23, RCPI 2, WBSP 4, DSP 2, MFB 1 and BBC 1. A 38-point Left Front election manifesto was presented in March 2001 at CPI(M) West Bengal headquarters, Muzaffar Bhavan, and was signed by Jyoti Basu (CPI(M)), Sailen Dasgupta (CPI(M)), Buddhadeb Bhattacharya (CPI(M), Anil Biswas (CPI(M)), Ashok Ghosh (AIFB), Debabrata Bandyopadhyay (RSP), Manjukumar Majumdar (CPI), Kiranmoy Nanda (SP), Prabodh Chandra Sinha (DSP), Mihir Byne (RCPI), Pratim Chatterjee (MFB) and Sunil Chaudhuri (BBC). A mass rally was held at Brigade Grounds on 25 March 2001 with participation from various Left Front leaders and with former Prime Minister V.P. Singh as special guest. CPI(M) won 142 seats, CPI 7, AIFB 25, RSP 17, WBSP 4, DSP 2 and BBC 1.

In 2 seats (Bara Bazar and Hirapur) the Left Front had supported candidates of Rashtriya Janata Dal and in 2 seats (Chowringee and Rash Behari Avenue) the alliance had backed candidates from Janata Dal (Secular). No RJD nor JD(S) candidates were elected. In Hirapur local CPI(M) cadres rebelled against the official RJD candidate and ran a dissident candidate of their own which finished in second place, ahead of the official Left Front-supported RJD candidate. The sixth Left Front government, with 48 ministers, was sworn in of 19 May 2001.

==== 2004 Lok Sabha election ====
In the 2004 Lok Sabha election, CPI(M) contested 32 seats, RSP 4 seats, CPI 3 seats and AIFB 3 seats. CPI(M) won 26 seats, CPI 3 seats, AIFB 3 seats and RSP 3 seats. The Left Front vote in West Bengal reached 18,766,404 votes (50.7% of the votes cast in the state).

=== Seventh Left Front government ===
==== 2006 assembly election ====
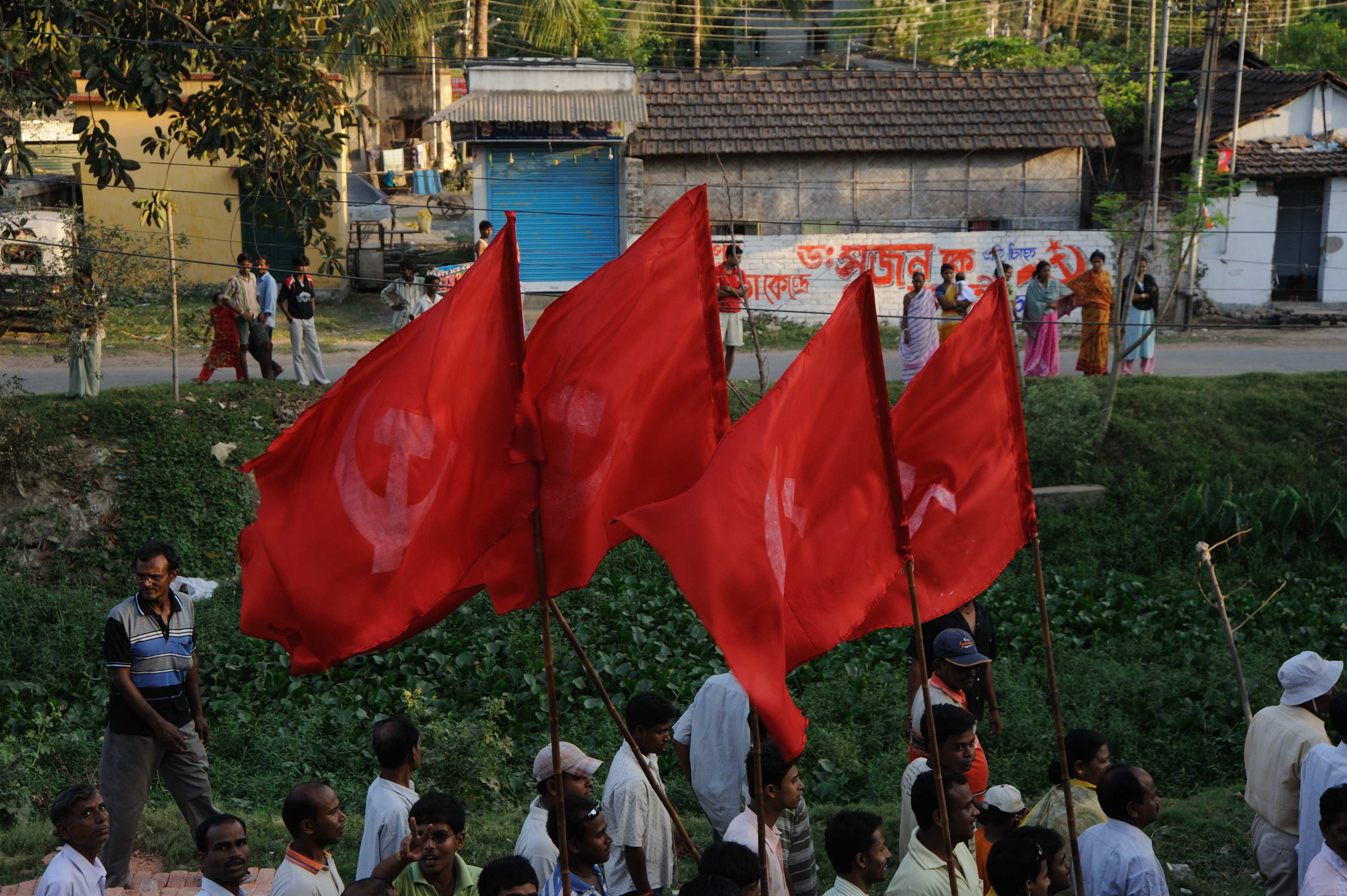
CPI(M) supporters during the 2009 election campaign

In the 2006 West Bengal Legislative Assembly election the Left Front won 234 out of 294 seats and received 19,800,148 votes (including votes for allies, representing 50.2% of the statewide vote). The Left Front had contested 290 seats (210 CPI(M), 34 AIFB, 23 RSP, 13 CPI, 4 WBSP, 2 DSP, 2 MFB, 1 RCPI, 1 BBC). In selecting candidates, the Left Front denied tickets to 64 incumbent legislators (52 from CPI(M), 8 from AIFB, 2 from WBSP, 1 from RSP, 1 from CPI), seeking to rejuvenate the list of candidates.

Out of the 234 seats won by the Left Front, 175 were won by CPI(M) candidates, 8 from CPI, 23 AIFB, 20 RSP, 4 WBSP, 2 MFB and 1 DSP. Most of the incumbent ministers were re-elected, exceptions being Prabodh Chandra Sinha (Parliamentary Affairs, DSP) and Mohammed Amin (Labour, CPI(M)). The Left Front Chief Whip, Rabin Deb, also lost his seat.

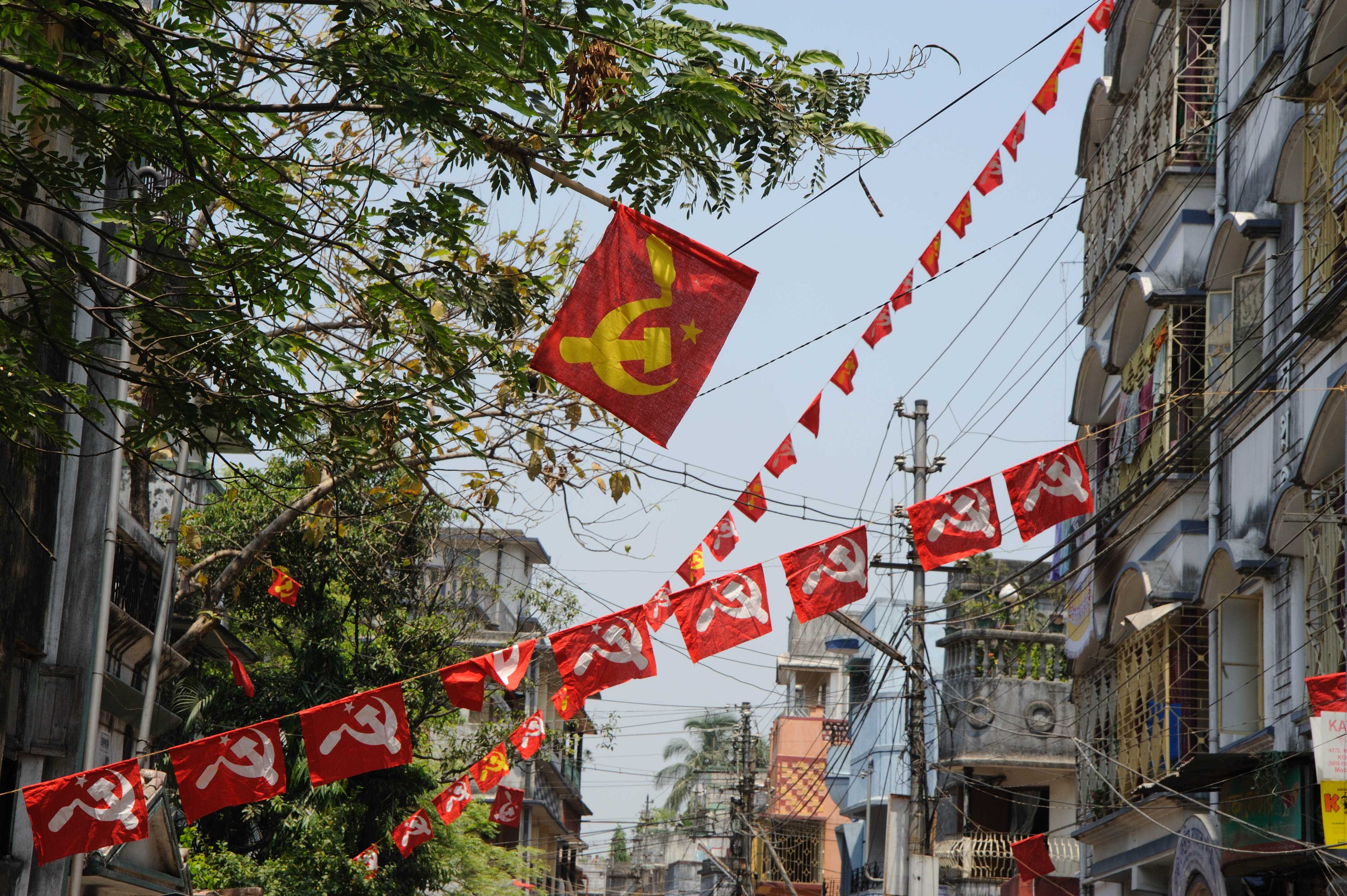
CPI(M) Flags during 2009 Lok Sabha election in West Bengal

In 4 seats the Left Front supported other parties, two each for the Rashtriya Janata Dal and the Nationalist Congress Party. One of the RJD candidates was elected.

The Left Front significantly improved its performance in comparison to 2001 in the North 24 Parganas and South 24 Parganas districts. Only in the Cooch Behar District did the Left Front suffer a reversal of fortunes. Following the 2006 election, Tata Motors announced that it would establish its Tata Nano car factory in Singur. A major land dispute surged. Likewise, a land dispute issue surged over a planned chemical factory in Nandigram. These two conflicts put severe strains on the Left Front 2007–2008. On 8 September 2008 the Left Front and the opposition All India Trinamool Congress reached an agreement on Singur dispute but in the next month Tata Motors announced that it withdrew from West Bengal.

In 2008 the Left Front won an overwhelming majority of the seats in the Howrah Municipal Corporation; out of a total of 50 seats in the Municipal Corporation CPI(M) won 26, CPI 3, AIFB 2, RCPI 1 and 1 seat for Janata Dal (Secular).

==== 2009 Lok Sabha election ====
The Left Front suffered a set-back in the 2009 Lok Sabha election. The CPI(M) contested 32 seats, CPI 3 seats, AIFB 3 seats, RSP 4 seats. CPI(M) won 9 seats from West Bengal, CPI, AIFB and RSP two seats each. The combined Left Front vote in West Bengal was 18,503,157 votes (43.3% of the votes cast in the state).

=== Left Front as main opposition (2011–2016) ===
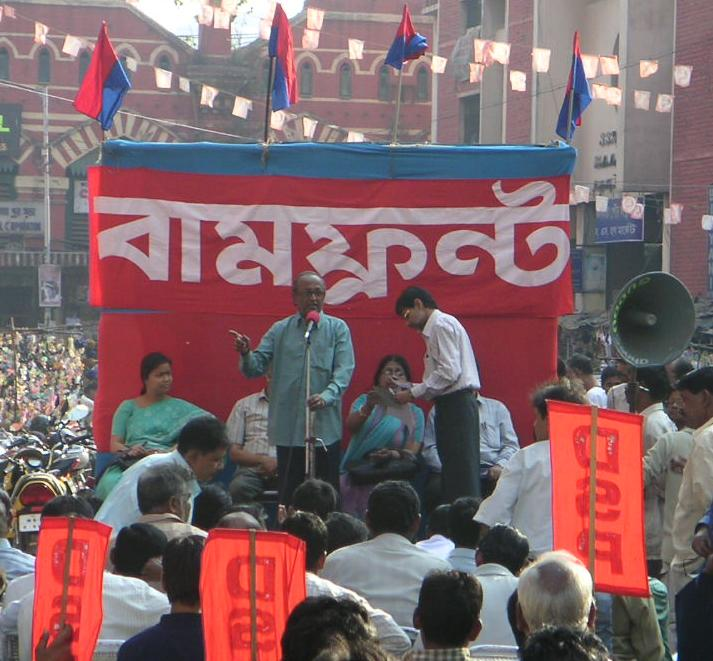
Meeting of Democratic Socialist Party (Prabodh Chandra) in Kolkata. Banner reads 'Bamfront', Bengali for 'Left Front'.

In the 2011 West Bengal Legislative Assembly election the Left Front failed to gain a majority of seats and the 34-year streak of continuous state government was broken.

CPI(M) had fielded 210 candidates, CPI 14, AIFB 34, RSP 23, SP 5, DSP 2, RCPI 2, MFB 2 and BBC 1. In one seat Left Front had supported a RJD candidate.

The combined strength of the Left Front in the newly elected assembly stood at 62; CPI(M) managed to win 40 seats, CPI 2, AIFB 11, RSP 7, SP 1 and DSP 1. The vote of Left Front and its allies had been 19,555,844 (41%).

For the first time since 1977, MFB lost the Tarakeswar seat.

In 2013 the Left Front was routed in the elections to the Howrah Municipal Corporation, losing control over the town for the first time in three decades. CPI(M) managed to win solely two out of 50 wards, all other Left Front partners drew blank. The incumbent CPI(M) mayor Mamta Jaiswal lost her seat. On the same day the Left Front lost also lost the local election in Jhargram, winning 1 out of 17 seats.

Ahead of the 2014 Lok Sabha election the Samajwadi Party (with whom the WBSP had merged) parted ways with the Left Front. The Samajwadi Party led by Kiranmoy Nanda (for many years the Fisheries Minister in the Left Front cabinets) had demanded that the Left Front allocate Lok Sabha seats to the party, a request that CPI(M) had refused.

The Left Front fielded 32 CPI(M) candidates to the Lok Sabha, 4 RSP candidates, 3 CPI candidates and 3 AIFB candidates. 26 out of the 42 candidates were new contestants. Out of the 42 candidates, only 2 CPI(M) candidates were elected. The Left Front vote in West Bengal was 15,287,783 votes (29.9% of the votes cast in the state).

In October 2014 a broader platform of cooperation between West Bengal left parties emerged, encompassing the ten Left Front parties (CPI(M), CPI, AIFB, RSP, DSP, RCPI, MFB, BBC, Workers Party of India, Bolshevik Party of India) as well as the Socialist Unity Centre of India (Communist), the Communist Party of India (Marxist–Leninist) Liberation, the Provisional Central Committee, Communist Party of India (Marxist-Leninist), the Party of Democratic Socialism, the Communist Party of Bharat and the CRLI. In 2014 the 16 party alliance pledged to commemorate 6 December (the day of the destruction of Babri Masjid) as Communal Harmony Day. As of 2015 Samajwadi Party was again a Left Front member, expanding the alliance to 17 parties. In July 2016 Janata Dal (United), Rashtriya Janata Dal and the Nationalist Congress Party also joined the left parties in protests against price hikes.

Ahead of the 2016 West Bengal Legislative Assembly election the Left Front presented a first list with 116 candidates on 7 March 2016. The list included 69 new candidates, 16 women and 25 candidates from religious minorities. At the time the Left Front was engaged in building a broader front with parties like Janata Dal (United) and NCP against the Trinamool Congress government. Moreover, an electoral understanding with the Indian National Congress was being sought. A second list of 84 candidates was released on 10 March 2016, to the displeasure of INC leaders as 14 constituencies on the Left Front list were already being contested by INC. The second list included 52 new candidates, 9 women and 20 Muslims. Apart from the 84 Left Front candidates, two candidates each from JD(U) and RJD were announced. Dialogue between Left Front and INC continued after the release of the Left Front second list.

Ahead of the 2016 election Nanda and his SP again resigned from the Left Front, citing opposition to the electoral tie-up with the Indian National Congress.

After a period of dispute between CPI(M) and INC over the Tarakeswar seat, it was agreed that NCP would field a candidate there. MFB continued to contest the Jamapur seat, however.

As per the Left-Congress electoral understanding, RCPI was requested to withdraw its candidate from the Hansan seat. The candidate did however contest anyway, against the wishes of the Left Front. He got 751 votes.

CPI(M) contested 147 seats, CPI 11, AIFB 25, RSP 19, DSP 2 and MFB 1. In total the Left Front won 32 seats; CPI(M) won 25 seats, AIFB 2, RSP 3, CPI 1 and MFB 1. The combined Left Front vote (excluding allies) was 14,216,327 (26% of the votes in the state).

=== Decline from 2016 to 2021 ===
On 30 July 2017, DSP announced that it had broken its links with the Left Front.

CPI(M) party-supported canteen (Sramajibi Canteen) had given food packets to labourers and poor people in various parts of Kolkata at a subsidised rate during the lockdown and had continued even after that. Strategies were implemented to combat COVID-19 and the destruction caused by cyclone Amphan especially in the Sunderbans on 20 May 2020 and its cadres and volunteers rushed in to help with basics like soap, food grains, cooked food and tarpaulin for people whose homes were destroyed.

In the months preceding the Assembly Elections, CPI(M) held rallies, conducted volunteer work and other activities in different parts of East and West Midnapore, in areas which had been difficult to access for them for over 10 years due to crude impeachment against the red jhanda by the TMC and Maoists alike.

In the preceding two years, after the reopening of all the party offices, the cadres were actively involved in various social welfare schemes with the participation of the youth in organising community kitchens, free ration and vegetable markets, safe housing, distribution of kits to students for studies and clothes to the underprivileged.

Among many social welfare initiatives, the Left had set up Rs. 50 health clinics and safe houses for the poor who cannot afford expensive medical care facilities amid the COVID-19 pandemic in the state. The CPI(M) had converted nearly 30 party offices into safe homes for poor people who did not have extra room at their dwellings for quarantining in case of COVID-19 infection.

=== Since 2021 ===
==== 2021 Assembly elections ====
On the eve of the 2021 West Bengal Legislative Assembly election Left Front had reiterated a political alliance with the Indian National Congress in order to uproot the Trinamool state government and oppose the advance of BJP in West Bengal. The Left Front raised slogans for the creation of a Left democratic secular government. The Indian Secular Front led by the Furfura Sharif cleric Abbas Siddique also joined the Mahajot and had finalized its seat-sharing capacities with the alliance. The new alliance had been termed as Sanjukta Morcha (translated in English: The United Front) [Bengali: সংযুক্ত মোর্চা]. The Left Parties contested in 175 seats, Congress in 92 and ISF in 37 seats. As per the decision, out of 175 seats, CPI(M) contested on 137 seats, AIFB on 18 seats, RSP on 11 seats, CPI on 10 seats and the MFB on 1 seat. The Left Front did not win any seats out of the 292 seats of which votes were counted on 2 May 2021. The alliance, "Sanjukta Morcha" had won 1 seat in total, the sole seat being won by Nawsad Siddique in Bhangar Constituency of West Bengal. That was the first time when, the West Bengal Legislative Assembly was devoid of any Left Front or INC MLA. The runner ups of CPIM stood as follows:

- Md. Kamal Hossain in Bhagabangola
- Md. Rostafizur Rahaman in Domkal
- Saiful Islam Molla in Jalangi
- Dr. Sujan Chakraborty in Jadavpur

The CPI(M) had, for a long time been running the Sramajibi Canteens and the Red Volunteers programme and continued to do the same, even after bagging only 4.6% of the vote share. The Sramajibi Canteens and the Red Volunteers service continued operating through all the COVID-19 waves.

==== 2021 Kolkata Municipal Corporation elections ====
The Left Front had contested in 128 seats and managed to secure 11.89% votes and 2 seats (CPI(M) and CPI each winning 1 seat in Ward 92 (Borough X) and Ward 103 (Borough XI) respectively) in the Kolkata Municipal Corporation election. The Left Front bagged a second position in 65 seats, more than any other party in the polls. Differentially, CPI(M) got 9.65%, CPI got 1.02%, RSP got 0.78% and AIFB got 0.44% of votes polled. Thus, in terms of vote-share, the Left Front emerged as the main opposition in the Kolkata Municipal Corporation.

==== 2022 municipal elections ====
During the civic body elections in February, the Left won an landslide victory in Taherpur municipality with an absolute majority. Taherpur got Uttam Ananda Das as the chairman by making the leftists win eight seats.

== Members ==
Left Front
Party	Flag	Ideology	State Secretary
National parties
Communist Party of India (Marxist)		Communism; Marxism–Leninism	Mohammed Salim
State parties
Communist Party of India		Communism; Marxism–Leninism	Swapan Banerjee
All India Forward Bloc		Left-wing nationalism Socialism; Anti-imperialism	Naren Chatterjee
Revolutionary Socialist Party		Communism; Anti-Stalinism	Tapan Hore
Unrecognized parties
Revolutionary Communist Party of India		Communism; Anti-Stalinism	Subhash Roy
Marxist Forward Bloc		Left-wing nationalism Socialism; Marxism	Ashish Chakraborty
Bolshevik Party of India		Communism	Probir Ghosh
Workers Party of India		Socialism	Shipra Chakraborty

== Chairmen ==
Promode Dasgupta served as Left Front Committee chairman during the early years of the alliance. Dasgupta died in November 1982, after which Saroj Mukherjee became Left Front chairman. Mukherjee retained the post until his death in 1990. Sailen Dasgupta served as chairman of the Left Front Committee from 1990 until his death in 2001. As Dasgupta suffered ailments in the latter part of his life, Biman Bose held the position as Acting Chairman of the Left Front Committee from 1998 to 2001. Bose took over as Chairman of the Left Front Committee after Dasgupta's death.

No.	Name	Tenure	Description
1	Promode Dasgupta	1977–1982	Served as Secretary of West Bengal State Committee of the Communist Party of India (Marxist) from 1964 to 1982.
2	Saroj Mukherjee	1982–1990	Served as Secretary of West Bengal State Committee of the Communist Party of India (Marxist) from 1982 to 1990.
3	Sailen Dasgupta	1990–1998	Served as Secretary of West Bengal State Committee of the Communist Party of India (Marxist) from 1990 to 1998.
4	Biman Bose	1998–Incumbent	Served as Secretary of West Bengal State Committee of the Communist Party of India (Marxist) from 2006 to 2015.

== Chief Ministers ==
Chief ministers of West Bengal from Left Front
No (Note: A number in parentheses indicates that the incumbent has previously held office.)	Portrait	Name	Constituency	Tenure (Note: While the tenures have been primarily sourced to a list on the West Bengal Legislative Assembly website, obvious errors (mainly around the 1969–71 period) have been corrected with the help of a historical essay from the same website.)		Duration	Assembly (election)	Party
1		Jyoti Basu	Satgachhia	21 June 1977	23 May 1982	23 years, 137 days	8th (1977 election)	Communist Party of India (Marxist)
1		Jyoti Basu	Satgachhia	24 May 1982	29 March 1987	23 years, 137 days	9th (1982 election)	Communist Party of India (Marxist)
1		Jyoti Basu	Satgachhia	30 March 1987	18 June 1991	23 years, 137 days	10th (1987 election)	Communist Party of India (Marxist)
1		Jyoti Basu	Satgachhia	19 June 1991	15 May 1996	23 years, 137 days	11th (1991 election)	Communist Party of India (Marxist)
1		Jyoti Basu	Satgachhia	16 May 1996	5 November 2000	23 years, 137 days	12th (1996 election)	Communist Party of India (Marxist)
2		Buddhadeb Bhattacharya	Jadavpur	6 November 2000	14 May 2001	10 years, 195 days	12th (1996 election)	Communist Party of India (Marxist)
2		Buddhadeb Bhattacharya	Jadavpur	15 May 2001	17 May 2006	10 years, 195 days	13th (2001 election)	Communist Party of India (Marxist)
2		Buddhadeb Bhattacharya	Jadavpur	18 May 2006	13 May 2011	10 years, 195 days	14th (2006 election)	Communist Party of India (Marxist)

== Electoral history ==
=== In Loksabha elections ===
Left Front election results in Loksabha election in West Bengal
Year	Legislature	Total seats	Seats won / contested	Change / in seats	Votes	% of votes	Notes
1977	6th Lok Sabha	42	23 / 26	▲23	5,049,077	33.4	Left Front contested only 26 out of 42 seats.
1980	7th Lok Sabha	42	38 / 42	▲15	11,086,354	52.7	Includes 3 CPI candidates.
1984	8th Lok Sabha	42	26 / 42	▼12	12,296,816	47.6	
1989	9th Lok Sabha	42	37 / 42	▲11	16,284,415	50.6	Includes 1 JD candidate
1991	10th Lok Sabha	42	37 / 42	Steady	14,955,151	47.1	Includes 2 JD candidates
1996	11th Lok Sabha	42	37 / 42	Steady	18,011,700	47.8	Includes 1 JD candidate
1998	12th Lok Sabha	42	33 / 42	▼4	17,101,211	46.0	
1999	13th Lok Sabha	42	29 / 42	▼4	16,494,424	46.1	
2004	14th Lok Sabha	42	35 / 42	▲6	18,766,404	50.7	
2009	15th Lok Sabha	42	15 / 42	▼20	18,503,157	43.3	
2014	16th Lok Sabha	42	2 / 42	▼13	15,287,783	29.9	
2019	17th Lok Sabha	42	0 / 40	▼2	4,269,471	7.96	Left Front only contested 40 seats.
2024	18th Lok Sabha	42	0 / 30	Steady	3,826,670	6.35	Left Front only contested 30 seats

=== In State Assembly elections ===
Left Front election results in State Assembly elections in West Bengal
Year	Leader	Votes	%	Seats	Notes
1977	Jyoti Basu	6,568,999	45.8	231 / 294	
1982	Jyoti Basu	11,869,003	52.7	238 / 294	
1987	Jyoti Basu	13,924,806	53.0	251 / 294	
1991	Jyoti Basu	15,090,595	48.7	245 / 294	Includes 8 JD candidates
1996	Jyoti Basu	18,143,795	49.3	203 / 294	Includes 5 JD candidates
2001	Buddhadeb Bhattacharjee	17,912,669	49.0	196 / 294	Includes 2 RJD and 2 JD(S) candidates
2006	Buddhadeb Bhattacharjee	19,800,148	50.2	235 / 294	Includes 2 RJD and 2 NCP candidates
2011	Buddhadeb Bhattacharjee	19,555,844	41.0	62 / 294	Includes 1 RJD candidate
2016	Surjya Kanta Mishra	14,216,327	26.0	32 / 294	Left Front only contested 205 seats.
2021	Surjya Kanta Mishra	3,400,984	5.67	0 / 294	Left Front only contested 177 seats.
2026	Mohammed Salim	3,220,124	5.04	1 / 294	Left Front only contested 252 seats.

== See also ==
- Left Democratic Front (Kerala)
- Left Front (Tripura)
- List of communist parties in India
- Communist Party of India (Marxist), West Bengal
