= 1991 West Bengal Legislative Assembly election =

- 24 April 1991

All 294 seats in the West Bengal Legislative Assembly 148 seats needed for a majority
- Turnout: 76.8%
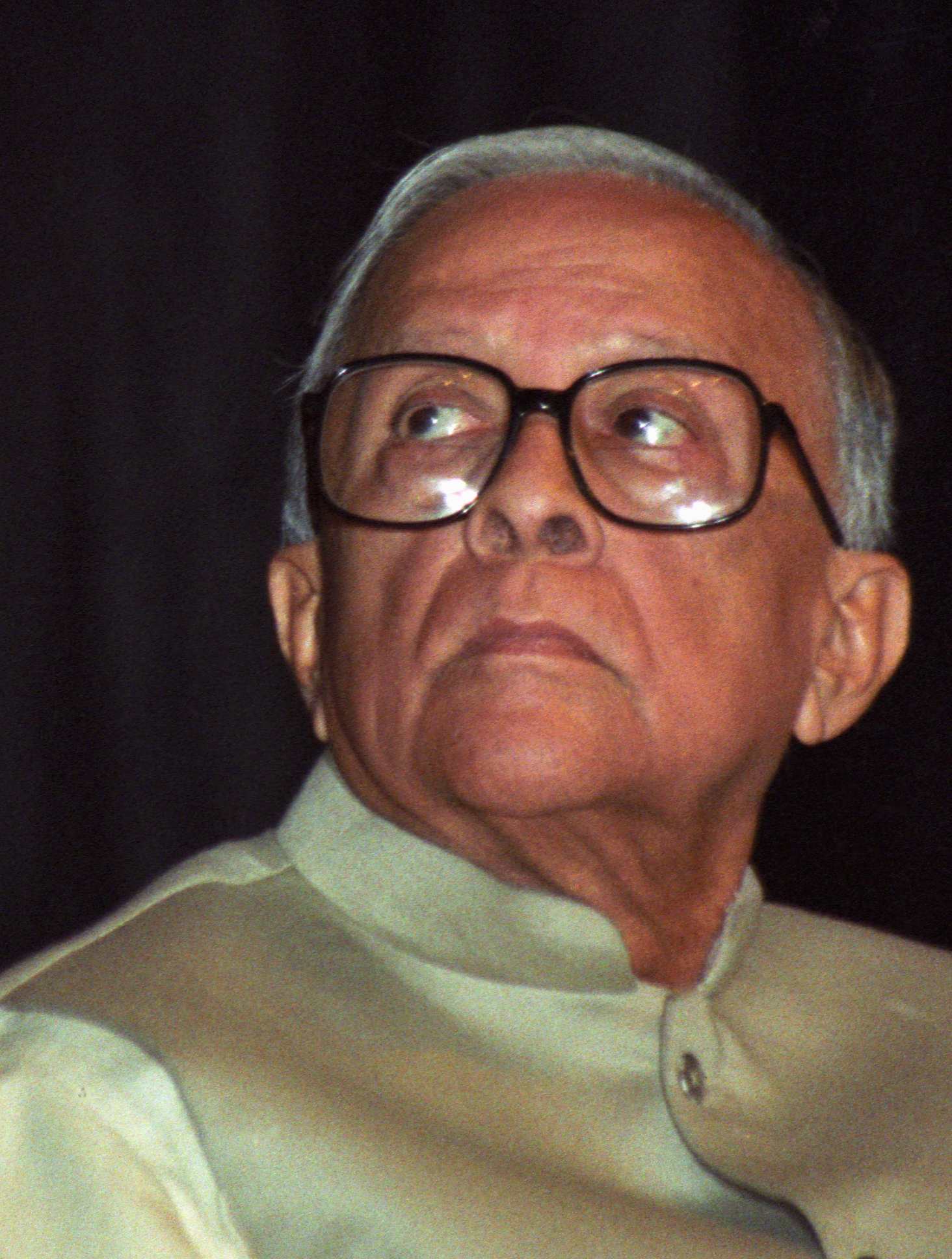

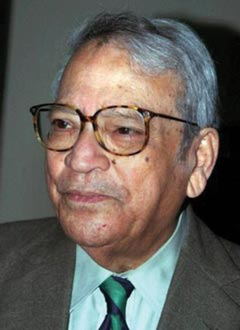
	First party	Second party
Leader	Jyoti Basu	Siddhartha Shankar Ray
Party	CPI(M)	INC
Alliance	LF	INC+
Leader since	1964	1991
Leader's seat	Satgachhia	Chowrangee
Last election	39.3%, 187 seats	41.81%, 40 seats
Seats won	182	43
Seat change	▼5	▲3
Coalition vote	10,954,379	10,875,834
Percentage	35.37%	35.12%
Swing	▼3.93 pp	▼6.71 pp
Alliance seats	245	47
Seat change	▼6	▲7
- Seatwise Result Map of the election

- Alliance wise Result
Chief Minister before election
Jyoti Basu
CPI(M)
Chief Minister after election
Jyoti Basu
CPI(M)

Legislative Assembly elections were held in the Indian state of West Bengal in 1991. The election took place simultaneously with the 1991 Indian general election. The term of the assembly elected in 1987 lasted until February 1992, but the West Bengal Government asked the Election Commission of India to arrange the election at an earlier date.

== Parties contesting the election ==
=== Left Front ===
The campaign of the Left Front focused on issues relating to secularism, communal harmony and the Mandal Commission.

The Communist Party of India (Marxist), the dominant partner in the Left Front, opted to deny reelection to 23 incumbent legislators, including one minister (Abdul Bari). In total CPI(M) fielded 204 candidates, AIFB 34, RSP 23, CPI 12, WBSP 4, MFB 2, DSP 2, RCPI 2, CRLI 1, Janata Dal 8 and the Akhil Bharatiya Gorkha League 1.

=== Congress ===
The Indian National Congress (Indira) had seat-sharing arrangement, whereby INC(I) contested 285 seats, the Jharkhand Party 4, the GNLF 3, UCPI 1 and 1 independent.

Jubilant over the CPI(M)-led alliance of Communist parties losing power in 1988 in Tripura, another Indian state with a Bengali majority under Communist rule since 1977, the Indian National Congress (I) brought back former Chief Minister Siddhartha Shankar Ray into the party ahead of the 1991 elections, and appointed him head of the West Bengal party unit. Whilst the Congress was keen to exploit Ray's popularity, who campaigned on the issues of corruption like the 'Bengal Lamp scam' raised by the former PWD minister of the Left Front Jatin Chakraborty, the 1990 Bantala rape case and alleged that the deindustrialisation of the state had been caused due to Jyoti Basu's support to hypeeactivity of Communist labour unions, the CPI(M) organ Ganashakti published articles on a daily basis reminding voters of Ray's role in perpetrating state-sponsored anti-Communist violence during the Emergency era.

The INC(I) was suffering from internal divisions in West Bengal at the time of the election. The West Bengal state party HQ was attacked by disgruntled Congressmen. In the midst of a rally in Diamond Harbour, with ex Prime Minister Rajiv Gandhi as speaker, rival Congress factions clashed.

At the time, the United Communist Party of India was a Congress ally. UCPI fielded a single candidate in Chandrakona constituency, who finished in second place.

=== Bharatiya Janata Party ===
The Bharatiya Janata Party fielded 291 candidates across the state. This was the first time BJP fielded such a large number of candidates in West Bengal assembly elections. Rather than focusing primarily on the Ram-mandir issue, which was highlighted in the BJP campaigns across the country, the West Bengal BJP campaign concentrated on agitations against illegal infiltration of Bengali Muslims from Bangladesh (which at that time.facing political instability due to the fall of Hussain Muhammad Ershad). The campaign sought to invoke memories of Partition among the Bengali Hindus, especially among the Bangal community, many of whom happenend to be East Bengali refugees. Whilst support for BJP increased amongst Bengali Hindu society, its main stronghold in the state remained non-Bengali Hindu populations in Calcutta (especially among Marwaris and Gujaratis).

=== Socialist Unity Centre of India ===
The Socialist Unity Centre of India fielded 59 candidates, contesting as independents. It had launched an electoral front ahead of the polls, along with some Naxalite factions, the Workers Party of India, a RCPI faction and the Bolshevik Party of India. SUCI won two seats.

== Seat Allotment ==
=== Left Front ===
Party	Flag	Symbol	Leader	Contesting Seats	
Communist Party of India (Marxist)			Jyoti Basu	204	225
Janata Dal			Vishwanath Pratap Singh	8	225
West Bengal Socialist Party			Kiranmoy Nanda	4	225
Biplobi Bangla Congress				2	225
Revolutionary Communist Party of India			Baneswar Saikia	2	225
Marxist Forward Bloc			Pratim Chatterjee	2	225
Democratic Socialist Party			Prabodh Chandra Sinha	1	225
Communist Revolutionary League of India				1	225
Akhil Bharatiya Gorkha League				1	225
All India Forward Bloc			Chitta Basu	34	
Revolutionary Socialist Party			Kshiti Goswami	23	
Communist Party of India			Indrajit Gupta	12	
Total				294	

=== Congress Alliance ===
Party	Flag	Symbol	Leader	Contesting Seats
Indian National Congress			Siddhartha Shankar Ray	285
Jharkhand Party			N. E. Horo	4
Gorkha National Liberation Front				3
United Communist Party of India			Mohit Sen	1
Independent				1
Total				294

=== Bharatiya Janata Party ===
Party	Flag	Symbol	Leader	Contesting Seats
Bharatiya Janata Party			Tapan Sikdar	291
Total				291

== Results ==
The election was won by the Left Front, marking its fourth consecutive assembly election victory. The Left Front and allies won 245 out of the 294 seats. BJP managed to increase its share of votes from 0.51% in 1987 to 11.34%. It was the best ever performance of BJP in the state until 2014 general elections.

Party		Candidates	Seats	Votes	%
Left Front & allies	Communist Party of India (Marxist)	204	182	10,954,379	35.37
Left Front & allies	All India Forward Bloc	34	29	1,707,676	5.51
Left Front & allies	Revolutionary Socialist Party	23	18	1,073,445	3.47
Left Front & allies	Communist Party of India	12	6	542,964	1.75
Left Front & allies	West Bengal Socialist Party	4	4	208,147	0.67
Left Front & allies	Marxist Forward Bloc	2	2	130,454	0.42
Left Front & allies	Democratic Socialist Party (Prabodh Chandra)	2	2	98,905	0.39
Left Front & allies	Revolutionary Communist Party of India	2	1	92,544	0.30
Left Front & allies	Biplobi Bangla Congress	1	0	50,414	0.16
Left Front & allies	Janata Dal	8	1	208,951	0.67
Left Front & allies	Akhil Bharatiya Gorkha League	1	0	35,489	0.11
Left Front & allies	Communist Revolutionary League of India	1	0	22,716	0.07
Congress & allies	Indian National Congress (Indira)	284	43	10,875,834	35.12
Congress & allies	Gorkha National Liberation Front	3	3	146,541	0.47
Congress & allies	Jharkhand Party	6	1	140,391	0.45
Congress & allies	United Communist Party of India	1	0	40,806	0.13
Congress & allies	Congress-supported independent	1	0	40,426	0.13
Bharatiya Janata Party		291	0	3,513,121	11.34
Jharkhand Mukti Morcha		23	0	95,038	0.31
Bahujan Samaj Party		97	0	88,836	0.29
Janata Party		78	0	50,037	0.16
Communist Party of India (Marxist-Leninist)		18	0	41,828	0.14
Indian People's Front		23	0	39,004	0.13
Indian Union Muslim League		28	0	28,156	0.09
Amra Bangalee		60	0	22,295	0.07
Workers Party of India		6	0	10,670	0.03
Hul Jharkhand Party		3	0	9,239	0.03
Doordashti Party		26	0	4,980	0.02
Marxist Communist Party of India		5	0	3,804	0.01
Akhil Bharatiya Hindu Mahasabha		5	0	1,553	0.01
Akhil Bharatiya Jan Sangh		6	0	1,485	0.00
Indian National Congress (O) Anti Merger Group		5	0	1,309	0.00
All India Dalit Muslim Minorities Suraksha Mahasangh		2	0	988	0.00
Revolutionary Communist Party of India (Gouranga Sit)		1	0	983	0.00
Shiv Sena		1	0	880	0.00
Indian Congress (Socialist-Sarat Chandra Sinha)		1	0	876	0.00
Bolshevik Party of India		1	0	335	0.00
Bharat Dal		1	0	203	0.00
Lok Dal		1	0	121	0.00
Bidhan Dal		1	0	92	0.00
Independents; Including Socialist Unity Centre of India candidates		631	2	684,130	2.21%
Total		1,903	294	30,970,045	100
Source: Election Commission of India

Since a CPI(M)-led alliance of Communist parties in Kerala had lost the elections in Kerala held simultaneously that year to a Congress-led alliance, West Bengal was the lone Indian state to be under Communist rule until 1993 when the Communists were re-elected back to power in Tripura.

== Elected members ==
Constituency	Reserved for (SC/ST/None)	Member	Party
Mekliganj	SC	Paresh Chandra Adhikary	All India Forward Bloc
Sitalkuchi	SC	Sudhir Pramanik	Communist Party of India
Mathabhanga	SC	Dinesh Chandra Dukua	Communist Party of India
Cooch Behar North	None	Bimal Kanti Basu	All India Forward Bloc
Cooch Behar West	None	Soumindra Chanra Das	All India Forward Bloc
Sitai	None	Dipal Sengupta	All India Forward Bloc
Dinhata	None	Kamal Kanti Guha	All India Forward Bloc
Natabari	None	Sibendranarayan Chowdhury	Communist Party of India
Tufanganj	SC	Debendra Nath Barman	Communist Party of India
Kumargram	ST	Salib Topo	Revolutionary Socialist Party
Kalchini	ST	Monohar Tirkey	Revolutionary Socialist Party
Alipurduars	None	Nirmal Das	Revolutionary Socialist Party
Falakata	SC	Jogesh Chandra Barman	Communist Party of India
Madarihat	ST	Sushil Kujur	Revolutionary Socialist Party
Dhupguri	SC	Banamali Roy	Communist Party of India
Nagrakata	ST	Chaitan Munda	Communist Party of India
Mainaguri	SC	Nityananda Adhikari	Revolutionary Socialist Party
Mal	ST	Jagannath Oraon	Communist Party of India
Kranti	None	Sudhan Raha	Communist Party of India
Jalpaiguri	None	Anupam Sen	Indian National Congress
Raiganj	SC	Jatindra Nath Roy	Communist Party of India
Kalimpong	None	Nima Tshering Moktan	Independent
Darjeeling	None	Narendra Kumai	Independent
Kurseong	None	Nar Bahadur Chettri	Independent
Siliguri	None	Asok Bhattacharya	Communist Party of India
Phansidewa	ST	Prokash Minj	Communist Party of India
Chopra	None	Mohamuddin	Communist Party of India
Islampur	None	Choudhury Md. Abdul Karim	Indian National Congress
Goalpokhar	None	Md. Ramjan Ali	All India Forward Bloc
Karandighi	None	Haji Sajjad Hossain	Indian National Congress
Raiganj	SC	Khagendra Nath Sinha	Communist Party of India
Kaliaganj	SC	Ramani Kanta Deb Sarma	Communist Party of India
Kushmandi	SC	Narmada Chandra Roy	Revolutionary Socialist Party
Itahar	None	Abedin Zainaj	Indian National Congress
Gangarampur	None	Minati Ghosh	Communist Party of India
Tapan	ST	Khara Soren	Revolutionary Socialist Party
Kumarganj	None	Dwijendras Nath Oroy	Communist Party of India
Balurghat	None	Biswanath Chowdhury	Revolutionary Socialist Party
Habibpur	ST	Sarkar Murmu	Communist Party of India
Gajol	ST	Debnath Murmu	Communist Party of India
Kharba	None	Nazmul Haque	Communist Party of India
Harishchandrapur	None	Birendra Kumar Moitra	All India Forward Bloc
Ratua	None	Mamtaz Begum	Communist Party of India
Araidanga	None	Sabitri Mitra	Indian National Congress
Malda	SC	Subhendu Chowdhury	Communist Party of India
Englishbazar	None	Prabhat Acharya	Communist Party of India
Manikchak	None	Subodh Chaudhury	Communist Party of India
Suzapur	None	Rubi Noor	Indian National Congress
Kaliachak	None	Dinesh Joardar	Communist Party of India
Farakka	None	Abul Hasnat Khan	Communist Party of India
Aurangabad	None	Touab Ali	Communist Party of India
Suti	None	Shish Mahammad	Revolutionary Socialist Party
Sagardighi	SC	Das Paresh Nath	Communist Party of India
Jangipur	None	Abdul Haque	Revolutionary Socialist Party
Lalgola	None	Abu Hena	Indian National Congress
Bhagabangola	None	Syed Mawabjani Meerza	Communist Party of India
Nabagram	None	Sisir Kumar Sarkar	Communist Party of India
Murshidabad	None	Chhaya Ghosh	All India Forward Bloc
Jalangi	None	Unus Sarkar	Communist Party of India
Domkal	None	Anesur Rahaman	Communist Party of India
Naoda	None	Nasiruddin Khan	Indian National Congress
Hariharpara	None	Mozammel Hoque	Communist Party of India
Berhampore	None	Sankar Das Paul	Indian National Congress
Beldanga	None	Nurul Islam Chowdhury	Indian National Congress
Kandi	None	Atish Ch. Sinha	Indian National Congress
Khargram	SC	Biswanath Mondal	Communist Party of India
Barwan	None	Debabratta Bandapadyay	Revolutionary Socialist Party
Bharatpur	None	Id. Mohammad	Revolutionary Socialist Party
Karimpur	None	Chitta Ranjan Biswas	Communist Party of India
Palashipara	None	Kamalendju Sanyal (sasthi)	Communist Party of India
Nakashipara	None	Shaik Khabiruddin Ahmed	Communist Party of India
Kaliganj	None	Abdus Salam Munshi	Indian National Congress
Chapra	None	Mir Quasem Mondal	Communist Party of India
Krishnaganj	SC	Sushil Biswas	Communist Party of India
Krishnagar East	None	Sibdas Mukherjee	Indian National Congress
Krishnagar West	None	Sunil Kumar Ghosh	Communist Party of India
Nabadwip	None	Biswanath Mitra	Communist Party of India
Shantipur	None	Ajoy Dey	Indian National Congress
Hanskhali	SC	Nayan Sarkar	Communist Party of India
Ranaghat East	SC	Binay Krishna Biswas	Communist Party of India
Ranaghat West	None	Subhaas Basu	Communist Party of India
Chakdaha	None	Satasadhan Chakraborty	Communist Party of India
Haringhata	None	Nani Gopal Malakar	Communist Party of India
Bagdaha	SC	Kamalakshi Biswas	All India Forward Bloc
Bongaon	None	Bhupendra Nath Seth	Indian National Congress
Gaighata	None	Pabir Banerjee	Indian National Congress
Habra	None	Kamal Sengupta (bose)	Communist Party of India
Ashokenagar	None	Nani Kar	Communist Party of India
Amdanga	None	Hashim Abdul Halim	Communist Party of India
Barasat	None	Saral Deb	All India Forward Bloc
Rajarhat	SC	Rabindra Nath Mandal	Communist Party of India
Deganga	None	Md. Yakub	All India Forward Bloc
Swarupnagar	None	Mustafa Bin Quasem	Communist Party of India
Baduria	None	Quazi Abdul Gaffar	Indian National Congress
Basirhat	None	Narayan Mukheree	Communist Party of India
Hasnabad	None	Goutam Deb	Communist Party of India
Haroa	SC	Kshiti Ranjan Modal	Communist Party of India
Sandeshkhali	SC	Dhiren Mondal	Communist Party of India
Hingalganj	SC	Gayen Nripen	Communist Party of India
Gosaba	SC	Ganesh Chandra Moindal	Revolutionary Socialist Party
Basanti	SC	Subhas Naskar	Revolutionary Socialist Party
Kultali	SC	Prabodh	Independent
Joynagar	None	Deba Prasad Sarkar	Independent
Baruipur	None	Shovan Dev Chattopadhyay	Indian National Congress
Canning West	SC	Bimal Mistry	Communist Party of India
Canning East	None	Abdur Razzak Molla	Communist Party of India
Bhangar	None	Badal Jamadar	Communist Party of India
Jadavpur	None	Buddhadeb Bhattacharjee	Communist Party of India
Sonarpur	SC	Bhadreswar Mondal	Communist Party of India
Bishnupur East	SC	Sundar Naskar	Communist Party of India
Bishnupur West	None	Kashinath Adak	Communist Party of India
Behala East	None	Kum-kum Chakraborti	Communist Party of India
Behala West	None	Nirmal Mukherjee	Communist Party of India
Garden Reach	None	Fazle Azim Molla	Indian National Congress
Maheshtala	None	Abdul Basar	Communist Party of India
Budge Budge	None	Dipak Mukherjee	Communist Party of India
Satgachia	None	Jyoti Basu	Communist Party of India
Falta	None	Arati Das Gupta	Communist Party of India
Diamond Harbour	None	Abdul Quiyom Molla	Communist Party of India
Magrahat West	None	Anuradha Putatunda	Communist Party of India
Magrahat East	SC	Nirmal Sinha	Communist Party of India
Mandirbazar	SC	Subhas Roy	Communist Party of India
Mathurapur	None	Satya Ranjan Pabuli	Indian National Congress
Kulpi	SC	Krishnadhan Halder	Communist Party of India
Patharpratima	None	Janmejey Manna	Communist Party of India
Kakdwip	None	Hrishikesh Maity	Communist Party of India
Bijpur	None	Jagadish Chandra Das	Communist Party of India
Naihati	None	Adhikari Tarun	Indian National Congress
Bhatpara	None	Bidyt Ganguly	Communist Party of India
Jagatdal	None	Nihar Basu	All India Forward Bloc
Noapara	None	Madan Mohan Nath	Communist Party of India
Titagarh	None	Pravin Kumar Shaw	Communist Party of India
Khardah	None	Asim Kumar Das Gupta	Communist Party of India
Panihati	None	Tania Chakrabarty	Communist Party of India
Kamarhati	None	Santi Ghatak	Communist Party of India
Baranagar	None	Matish Roy	Revolutionary Socialist Party
Dum Dum	None	Sankar Kumar Sen	Communist Party of India
Belgachia East	None	Subhash Chakraborty	Communist Party of India
Cossipur	None	Dipak Chanda	Communist Party of India
Shyampukur	None	Santi Ranjan Ganguly	All India Forward Bloc
Jorabagan	None	Subrata Mukherjee	Indian National Congress
Jorasanko	None	Deokinandan Poddar	Indian National Congress
Bara Bazar	None	Khaitan Rajesh	Indian National Congress
Bow Bazar	None	Sudip Bandyopadhyay	Indian National Congress
Chowringhee	None	Siddhartha Shanker Ray	Indian National Congress
Kabitirtha	None	Kalimuddin Shams	All India Forward Bloc
Alipore	None	Sougata Roy	Indian National Congress
Rashbehari Avenue	None	Hoimi Basu	Indian National Congress
Tollygunge	None	Sur Prasanta Kumar	Communist Party of India
Dhakuria	None	Kshiti Goswami	Revolutionary Socialist Party
Ballygunge	None	Sachin Sen	Communist Party of India
Entally	None	Md. Nizamuddin	Communist Party of India
Taltola	SC	Debesh Das	Communist Party of India
Beliaghata	None	Manabendra Mukherjee	Communist Party of India
Sealdah	None	Somendra Nath Misra	Indian National Congress
Vidyasagar	None	Lakshmi Kanta Dey	Communist Party of India
Burtola	None	Sadhan Pande	Indian National Congress
Manicktola	None	Shyamal Chakraborty	Communist Party of India
Belgachia West	None	Rajdeo Goala	Communist Party of India
Bally	None	Patit Paban Pathak	Communist Party of India
Howrah North	None	Lagan Deo Singh	Communist Party of India
Howrah Central	None	Ambika Banerjee	Indian National Congress
Howrah South	None	Pralay Talukdar	Communist Party of India
Shibpur	None	Jatu Lahiri	Indian National Congress
Domjur	None	Padmanidhi Dhar	Communist Party of India
Jagatballavpur	None	M. Anakaruddin	Communist Party of India
Panchla	None	Sailen Mondal	All India Forward Bloc
Sankrail	SC	Haran Hazra	Communist Party of India
Sagar	None	Prabhanjan Mondal	Communist Party of India
Uluberia North	SC	Raj Kumar Mondal	Communist Party of India
Uluberia South	None	Rabindra Ghosh	All India Forward Bloc
Shyampur	None	Sangib Kumar Das	Indian National Congress
Bagnan	None	Nirupama Chattopadhayay	Communist Party of India
Kalyanpur	None	Nitai Charan Adak	Communist Party of India
Amta	None	Barindra Nath Koley	Communist Party of India
Udaynarayanpur	None	Panna Lal Maji	Communist Party of India
Jangipara	None	Manindra Jana	Communist Party of India
Chanditala	None	Malin Ghosh	Communist Party of India
Uttarpara	None	Santasir Chatterjee	Communist Party of India
Serampore	None	Arun Goswami	Indian National Congress
Champdani	None	Abdul Mannan	Indian National Congress
Chandernagore	None	Chatterjee Sandhya	Communist Party of India
Singur	None	Bidyut Kumar Das	Communist Party of India
Haripal	None	Kali Krasad Biswas	Communist Party of India
Tarakeswar	None	Santi Chatterjee	Independent
Chinsurah	None	Naren Dey	All India Forward Bloc
Bansberia	None	Prabir Sen Gupta	Communist Party of India
Balagarh	SC	Abinash Pramanik	Communist Party of India
Pandua	None	Debnarayan Chakraborty	Communist Party of India
Polba	None	Brajo Gopal Neogy	Communist Party of India
Dhaniakhali	SC	Kripa Sindhu Saha	All India Forward Bloc
Pursurah	None	Bishnu Bera	Communist Party of India
Khanakul	SC	Sachindra Nath Hazra	Communist Party of India
Arambagh	None	Benode Das	Communist Party of India
Goghat	SC	Shiba Prasad Malick	All India Forward Bloc
Chandrakona	None	Umapati Chakrabortty	Communist Party of India
Ghatal	SC	Ratan Chandra Pakhira	Communist Party of India
Daspur	None	Prabhas Podikar	Communist Party of India
Nandanpur	None	Chhaya Bera	Communist Party of India
Panskura West	None	Sk. Omar Ali	Communist Party of India
Panskura East	None	Sisir Sarkar	Communist Party of India
Tamluk	None	Anil Mudi	Indian National Congress
Moyna	None	Manik Bhowmik	Indian National Congress
Mahishadal	None	Sukumar Das	Indian National Congress
Sutahata	SC	Seth Lakshman Chandra	Communist Party of India
Nandigram	None	Sakti Bal	Communist Party of India
Narghat	None	Nada Brahmamoy	Communist Party of India
Bhagabanpur	None	Prasanta Pradhan	Communist Party of India
Khajuri	SC	Sunirmal Paik	Communist Party of India
Contai North	None	Mukul Bikash Maity	Indian National Congress
Contai South	None	Sailaja Kumar Das	Indian National Congress
Ramnagar	None	Mrinal Kanti Roy	Communist Party of India
Egra	None	Sinha Probodh Chandra	Communist Party of India
Mugberia	None	Krianmoy Nanda	Communist Party of India
Pataspur	None	Kamakhya Nandan Das Mahapatra	Communist Party of India
Sabang	None	Manas Ranjan Bhunia	Indian National Congress
Pingla	None	Hari Pada Jana	Democratic Socialist Party
Debra	None	Sheikh Jahangir Karim	Communist Party of India
Keshpur	SC	Dal Nanda Rani	Communist Party of India
Garhbeta East	None	Susanta Ghosh	Communist Party of India
Garhbeta West	SC	Duley Krishna Prasad	Communist Party of India
Salbani	None	Sundar Hazra	Communist Party of India
Midnapore	None	Kamaksha Ghosh	Communist Party of India
Kharagpur Town	None	Gyan Msingh Sohanpal	Indian National Congress
Kharagpur Rural	None	Sheikh Najmul Haque	Communist Party of India
Keshiari	ST	Maheswar Murmu	Communist Party of India
Narayangarh	None	Surja Kanta Mishra	Communist Party of India
Dantan	None	Patra Ranjit	Communist Party of India
Nayagram	ST	Ananta Saren	Communist Party of India
Gopiballavpur	None	Atul Chandra Das	Communist Party of India
Jhargram	None	Buddha Deb Bhakat	Communist Party of India
Binpur	ST	Naren Hansda	All India Jharkhand Party
Banduan	ST	Lakhi Ram Kisku	Communist Party of India
Manbazar	None	Kamala Kanta Mahata	Communist Party of India
Balrampur	ST	Bhandu Majhi	Communist Party of India
Arsa	None	Nishi Kanta Mehta	All India Forward Bloc
Jhalda	None	Satyan Ranjank Mahata	All India Forward Bloc
Jaipur	None	Bindeswar Mahata	All India Forward Bloc
Purulia	None	Mamata Mukherjee	Communist Party of India
Para	SC	Bilasi Bala Sahis	Communist Party of India
Raghunathpur	SC	Natabar Bagdi	Communist Party of India
Kashipur	ST	Surendra Nath Majhi	Communist Party of India
Hura	None	Ambarish Mukhopadhyaya	Communist Party of India
Taldangra	None	Amiya Patra	Communist Party of India
Raipur	ST	Lipen Kisku	Communist Party of India
Ranibandh	ST	Arati Bembram	Communist Party of India
Indpur	SC	Madan Bawri	Communist Party of India
Chhatna	None	Subhas Goswami	Revolutionary Socialist Party
Gangajalghati	SC	Angad Bauri	Communist Party of India
Barjora	None	Jayasri Mitra	Communist Party of India
Bankura	None	Partha De	Communist Party of India
Onda	None	Anil Mukherjee	All India Forward Bloc
Vishnupur	None	Achintya Krishna Ray	Communist Party of India
Kotulpur	None	Gouri Pada Dutta	Communist Party of India
Indas	SC	Nanda Dulal Majhi	Communist Party of India
Kulti	None	Acharje Manik Lal	All India Forward Bloc
Barabani	None	S. R. Das	Communist Party of India
Hirapur	None	Mumtaz Hassan	Janata Dal
Sonamukhi	SC	Haradhan Bauri	Communist Party of India
Asansol	None	Goutam Roy Chowdhury	Communist Party of India
Raniganj	None	Bansa Gopal Chowdhury	Communist Party of India
Jamuria	None	Chowdhury Bikash	Communist Party of India
Ukhra	SC	Bagdi Lakhan	Communist Party of India
Durgapur-i	None	Dilip Mazumdar	Communist Party of India
Durgapur-ii	None	Tarun Chatterje	Communist Party of India
Kanksa	SC	Krishna Chandra Halder	Communist Party of India
Ausgram	SC	Sreedhar Malik	Communist Party of India
Bhatar	None	Meheboo Zaredi	Communist Party of India
Galsi	None	Idrish Mondal	All India Forward Bloc
Burdwan North	None	Benoy Krishna Chowdhury	Communist Party of India
Burdwan South	None	Shayam Prosad Bose	Communist Party of India
Khandaghosh	SC	Daula Shiba Prasad	Communist Party of India
Raina	None	Chatterjee Dhirendra Nath	Communist Party of India
Jamalpur	SC	Samar Hazara	Communist Party of India
Memari	None	Konar Maharani	Communist Party of India
Kalna	None	Anju Kar	Communist Party of India
Nadanghat	None	Biren Ghosh	Communist Party of India
Manteswar	None	Abu Ayes Mondal	Communist Party of India
Purbasthali	None	Monoranjan Nath	Communist Party of India
Katwa	None	Anjan Chatterjee	Communist Party of India
Mangalkot	None	Samar Baora	Communist Party of India
Ketugram	SC	Raicharan Majhi	Communist Party of India
Nanur	SC	Ananda Gopal Das	Communist Party of India
Bolpur	None	Tapan Hore	Revolutionary Socialist Party
Labhpur	None	Manik Chandra Mandal	Communist Party of India
Dubrajpur	None	Bhakti Bhusan Mondal	All India Forward Bloc
Rajnagar	SC	Bijoy Bagdi	All India Forward Bloc
Suri	None	Tapan Roy	Communist Party of India
Mahammad Bazar	None	Dhiren Sen	Communist Party of India
Mayureswar	SC	Dhiren Let	Communist Party of India
Rampurhat	None	Sashanka Mondal	All India Forward Bloc
Hansan	SC	Trilochon Das	Revolutionary Communist Party of India
Nalhati	None	Sattick Kumar Ray	All India Forward Bloc
Murarai	None	Motahar Hossain	Indian National Congress

== See also ==
- 1991 Kandua hand-chopping
