= Lateef Saheb Dargah =

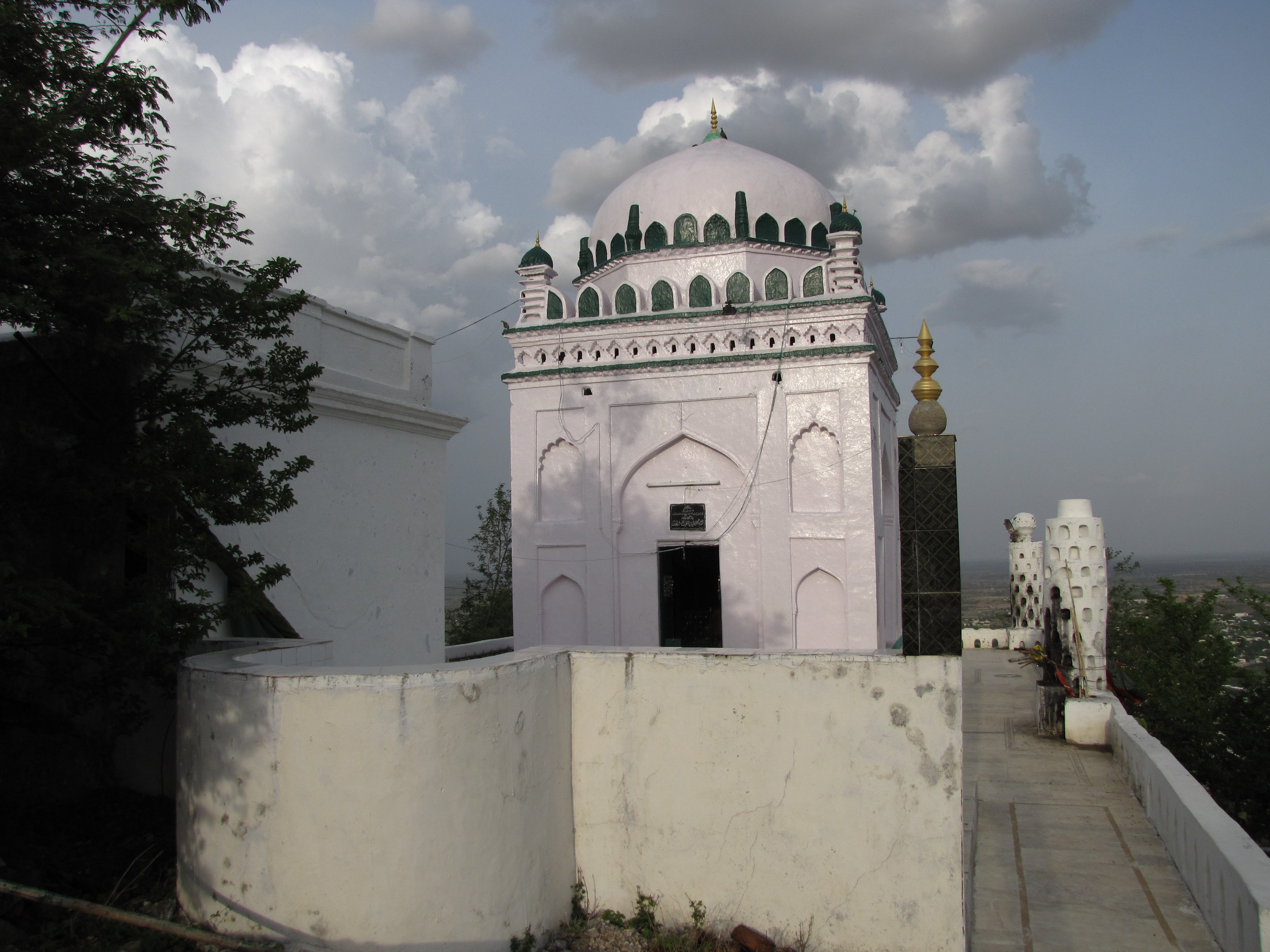
Lateef Saheb Dargah

Lateef Ullah Shah Quadri Darga or Lateef Saheb Dargah is a Sufi shrine located in the Nalgonda District of Telangana, India. It is situated on a hillock. Pilgrims and tourists trek the hammock to succeed in the shrine and supply their prayers. This Dargah celebrates a three-day urs per annum, that is attended by sizable number of devotees.

== History ==
Nalgonda could be a residential district from earlier period, fantastically set amidst two hills with a fort on one of the hills and a large rock structure wherever the Lateef Saheb Dargah is currently settled. Another vital feature of this hill is that of an outsized reservoir of water inside a hollow of the rock. Another aspect is that through a little gap, one can check if water is accessible, though most of the time water is present to the brim.

For the hill is termed as Kapuralagutta which means a family residential, where the families of the rulers were living safely. There's a water storage purpose on this hill similarly for the residents’ use.

During the time of Bahamani swayer, Shihabud-din Mahmun swayer Quli had functioned as Tarafdar of Telangana region of province. Later his son Jamshid succeeded him. Throughout the later periods too, the district was underneath the management of Qutub Shahis till 1687.

Nizam-ul-Mulk (Asaf Jah I) United Nations agency defeated Mubasiz Khan at Berar, dominated the Deccan freelance of the other states over him and this district was underneath his management for over two centuries.

=== Urs ===
The three-day Urs pageant honouring Lateef Saheb Quadri Dargah is conducted annually with a grand inauguration ceremony presided over by Mutavalli of Dargah shareef Syed Basharath ulla quadri and Brothers.

Affirming the non secular tolerance and amity among varied sections, individuals from alternative religions additionally be a part of the procession, like Hanuman devotees dressed up with saffron robes participate within the procession that go through the streets of Nalgonda city before reaching the Dargah. Within the same procession, Fakirs with needles perforate in several components of the body, that embody tongue, throat, cheeks, eyelids, chest, etc that could be a spectacular incident here. A ‘jatara’ follows the Urs.
