= Hawladar =

Howlader
- Pronunciation: Howlader
- Language: Bengali

Origin
- Origin: Bengali
- Meaning: land-lord with Administrative power
- Region of origin: Bengal

Other names
- Alternative spelling: Howlader, Howladar, Haoladar

Howlader (Bengali: হাওলাদার) is a native Bengali surname. The surname commonly used by many Bengali castes such as Namasudra, Baishya Kapali, Byghra Kshatriya etc.

== Notable ==
- Khuda Buksh Hawladar (1912–1974), Bangladeshi businessman and humanitarian
- Ahsan Habib Hawladar (1917–1985), poet
- A. F. Mohammad Nurul Haque Hawladar (1935–1973), politician and freedom fighter
- Motahar Uddin Ahmad Hawladar (1935–1974), politician from Bhola
- Faruque Alam Hawladar (1940–2020), chairman of Bangladesh Inland Water Transport Corporation
- Mohammad Matiar Rahman Howlader (born 1957), vice-chancellor of Sylhet Agricultural University
- Lawrence Subrata Howlader (born 1965), prelate of the Catholic Church, bishop of Barisal and archbishop of Chattogram
- Abdul Mannan Howlader (died 2015), politician from Barisal
- A. B. Mohammad Ruhul Amin Howlader (born 1953), politician and co-chairman of the Jatiya Party
- Aftab Uddin Howlader, politician from Bagerhat
- Anwar Hossain Howlader, politician from Patuakhali
- Mokim Hossain Howlader, politician from Jhalokati
- Mujibur Rahman Howlader, politician from Gopalganj
- Shahjahan Hawlader Sujan (died 2001), assassinated politician
- Ujjal Howladar (born 1993), footballer
- Sujon Hawlader (born 1995), cricketer

== See also ==
- Haldar
