= Abdul Quiyom Molla =

Indian politician

Abdul Quiyom Molla is an Indian politician from West Bengal. He is a seven time member of the West Bengal Legislative Assembly from Diamond Harbour Assembly constituency in South 24 Parganas district. He became an MLA in 1967 and last won the 1991 West Bengal Legislative Assembly election representing the Communist Party of India (Marxist).

== Early life and career ==
Molla is from Diamond Harbour, South 24 Parganas district, West Bengal.

Molla first became an MLA winning from Diamond Harbour Assembly constituency representing the Communist Party of India (Marxist) in the 1967 West Bengal Legislative Assembly election. He retained the seat in the next two elections for the Communist Party winning the 1969 election and the 1971 West Bengal Legislative Assembly election. He lost the next election in 1972 to Sheikh Daulat Ali of the Indian National Congress by a margin of 8,596 votes. However, he was elected for the fourth time in the 1977 West Bengal Legislative Assembly election where he defeated Sankari Prasad Mondal of the Janata Party. He went on to win in the 1982, 1987 and 1991 elections to become a seven time MLA. Once again, Sheikh Daulat Ali of the Congress halted his run winning the 1996 West Bengal Legislative Assembly election.
