= 1991 Kandua hand-chopping =

Terrorist incident in India

After the 1991 West Bengal Legislative Assembly election, a mob belonging to the Communist Party of India (CPM) attacked Gopal Patra, a leader of the Indian National Congress. The CPM members chopped off his hands and legs and ripped off the breasts of two women. The mob chopped off the hands of seven villagers who voted for Congress. The case was filed at Amta police station and the arrested CPM men were released on bail.

The victims allege that their hands were chopped off for supporting Congress, but they were neglected by the Congress party. Anandabazar Patrika reports that the attacks were made with swords, rods and spear. 119 people were named in FIR. The accused killed Gopal Patra with swords and chopped off the breasts of one woman. Then they burned 100 huts in the village.

In 2016, CPM leader Surjya Kanta Mishra mentioned that hand chopping was wrong, after CPM and Congress formed a political alliance against Trinamool Congress during the 2016 West Bengal Legislative Assembly election.
