= Halfar =

Halfar is a German surname, used also in Czechia. Notable people with the surname include:

- Daniel Halfar (born 1988), German footballer
- Sören Halfar (born 1987), German footballer
- Radomír Halfar, Czechoslovak slalom canoeist

== See also ==
- Haldar
