= Dastidar =

Dastidar is a surname. Notable people with the surname include:

- Jayanta Dastidar (born 1973), Indian former cricketer
- Jyotirmoy Ghosh Dastidar a.k.a. Shanku Maharaj, Indian traveller and author
- Kakoli Ghosh Dastidar (born 1959), Indian politician
- Purnendu Dastidar (1909–1971), Bengali politician, writer and lawyer
- Sudarshan Ghosh Dastidar, Indian politician
- Tarakeswar Dastidar (d. 1934), Indian independence activist
