= Diamond Harbour Assembly constituency =

West Bengal Legislative Assembly Constituency

Diamond Harbour
- Constituency No. 143 for the West Bengal Legislative Assembly
- Interactive Map Outlining Diamond Harbour Assembly Constituency

Constituency details
- Country: India
- Region: East India
- State: West Bengal
- District: South 24 Parganas
- Lok Sabha constituency: Diamond Harbour
- Established: 1951
- Total electors: 2,54,964
- Reservation: None

Member of Legislative Assembly
- 18th West Bengal Legislative Assembly
- Incumbent Pannalal Halder
- Party: AITC
- Alliance: AITC+
- Elected year: 2026

Diamond Harbour Assembly constituency is a Legislative Assembly constituency of South 24 Parganas district in the Indian State of West Bengal.

== Overview ==
As per order of the Delimitation Commission in respect of the Delimitation of constituencies in the West Bengal, Diamond Harbour Assembly constituency is composed of the following:

- Diamond Harbour municipality
- Basuldanga, Bolsiddhi Kalinagar, Derak, Harindanga, Kanpur Dhanaberia, Mashat and Parulia gram panchayats of Diamond Harbour I community development block
- Kamarpole, Khorda, Mathur, Nurpur, Patra and Sarisa gram panchayats of Diamond Harbour II community development block

Diamond Harbour Assembly constituency is a part of No. 21 Diamond Harbour (Lok Sabha constituency).

== Members of the Legislative Assembly ==
Year	Name	Party
1952	Charu Chandra Bhandari	Kisan Mazdoor Praja Party
1957	Ramanuj Halder	Praja Socialist Party
1962	Jagadish Chandra Halder	Indian National Congress
1967	Abdul Quiyom Molla	Communist Party of India (Marxist)
1969	Abdul Quiyom Molla	Communist Party of India (Marxist)
1971	Abdul Quiyom Molla	Communist Party of India (Marxist)
1972	Daulat Ali Sheikh	Indian National Congress
1977	Abdul Quiyom Molla	Communist Party of India (Marxist)
1982	Abdul Quiyom Molla	Communist Party of India (Marxist)
1987	Abdul Quiyom Molla	Communist Party of India (Marxist)
1991	Abdul Quiyom Molla	Communist Party of India (Marxist)
1996	Sheikh Daulat Ali	Indian National Congress
2001	Rishi Halder	Communist Party of India (Marxist)
2006	Rishi Halder	Communist Party of India (Marxist)
2011	Dipak Kumar Halder	Trinamool Congress
2016	Dipak Kumar Halder	Trinamool Congress
2021	Pannalal Halder	Trinamool Congress
2026	Pannalal Halder	Trinamool Congress

== Election results ==
=== 2026 ===
2026 West Bengal Legislative Assembly election: Diamond Harbour
Party	Candidate	Votes	%	±%
AITC	Pannalal Halder	119,320	51.38	▲7.69
BJP	Dipak Kumar Halder	88,054	37.92	▲1.77
CPI(M)	Samar Naiya	17,594	7.58	▼9.6
NOTA	None of the above	1,379	0.59	▼0.05
Majority		31,266	13.46	▲5.92
Turnout		232,238	94.69	▲6.34
AITC hold		Swing		

=== 2021 ===
2021 West Bengal Legislative Assembly election: Diamond Harbour
Party	Candidate	Votes	%	±%
AITC	Pannalal Halder	98,478	43.69	▼4.89
BJP	Dipak Kumar Halder	81,482	36.15	▲28.82
CPI(M)	Pratik Ur Rahaman	38,719	17.18	▼23.85
NOTA	None of the above	1,449	0.64	
Majority		16,996	7.54	
Turnout		225,397	88.35	
AITC hold		Swing		

=== 2016 ===
2016 West Bengal Legislative Assembly election: Diamond Harbour
Party	Candidate	Votes	%	±%
AITC	Dipak Kumar Halder	96,833	48.58	▼4.79
CPI(M)	Abul Hasnat	81,796	41.03	▲0.31
BJP	Balaram Halder	14,614	7.33	▲4.32
NOTA	None of the Above	2,109	1.06	
Majority		15,037	7.55	▼5.1
Turnout		1,99,346	88.09	▲2.79
AITC hold		Swing		

=== 2011 ===
2011 West Bengal Legislative Assembly election: Diamond Harbour
Party	Candidate	Votes	%	±%
AITC	Dipak Kumar Halder	87,645	53.37	
CPI(M)	Subhra Sau	66,871	40.72	
BJP	Krishna Baidya	4,946	3.01	
PDS	Mousumi Maitra	2,951	1.80	
IUC	Mohammad Shamshut Touhid	1,797	1.09	
Majority		20,774	12.65	
Turnout		1,64,210	85.30	
AITC gain from CPI(M)		Swing		

=== 2006 ===
In 2006 and 2001, Rishi Halder of CPI(M) won the Diamond Harbour Assembly constituency defeating his nearest rivals Subhashis Chakraborty of AITC and Amjad Ali Sardar of AITC respectively. Sheikh Daulat Ali of INC defeated Abdul Quiyom Molla of CPI(M) in 1996. Abdul Quiyom Molla of CPI(M) defeated Nazrul Islam Molla of INC in 1991, Monoranjan Kayal of INC in 1987, Dibakar Ghosh of INC in 1982, and Sankari Prasad Mondal of Janata Party in 1977.

=== 1972 ===
Daulat Ali Sheikh of INC won in 1972. Abdul Quiyom Molla of CPI(M) won in 1971, 1969 and 1967. Jagadish Chandra Halder of INC won in 1962. Ramanuj Halder of PSP won in 1957. Charu Chandra Bhandari of KMPP won in 1952.
