= Promode Dasgupta =

Indian politician

- Dasgupta, c. 1978

Member of Polit Bureau, Communist Party of India (Marxist)
- In office 7 November 1964 – 29 November 1982

State Secretary of the Communist Party of India (Marxist), West Bengal
- In office 1964–1982
- Preceded by: Position created
- Succeeded by: Saroj Mukherjee

Chairman of the Left Front
- In office 1977–1982
- Preceded by: Position created
- Succeeded by: Saroj Mukherjee

Personal details
- Born: 13 July 1910 Kaurpur village, Bengal Presidency, British India (now in Bangladesh)
- Died: 29 November 1982 (aged 72) Beijing, China

Promode Dasgupta (13 July 1910 – 29 November 1982) was an Indian Communist politician from West Bengal, often referred to as PDG. He was the first leader of the West Bengal unit of the Communist Party of India (Marxist) (CPI(M)), serving as State Secretary from the party's birth in 1964 until his death in 1982. He was also a member of the CPI(M)'s politburo, its supreme decision-making body. Although he personally never contested an election, Dasgupta earned a reputation as a disciplined organiser of the party and its cadres. Under his leadership, the CPI(M)-led Left Front came to power in a landslide victory in the 1977 election, and remained the dominant force in West Bengal politics for several decades following Dasgupta's death.

== Biography ==
Promode Dasgupta was born in July 1910 in a Baidya family in Kaurpur village in the undivided Bengal of British India; it is now a part of Bangladesh. His father was a doctor employed in government service. Dasgupta had eight siblings, of whom one sister would become a fellow CPI(M) member. PDG says of his youth, "I joined the university but gave it up soon after to become an apprentice in a workshop".

== Working style and personality ==
In a 1978 article written during the first year of the Left Front government, India Today compared the personalities and leadership styles of West Bengal chief minister Jyoti Basu and Promode Dasgupta. It described the former as an urbane, mild-mannered statesman from a prosperous family who had attended Calcutta's top schools and studied law in Britain, where his conversion to Marxism had occurred. In contrast, India Today characterised Dasgupta as a "homespun Marxist" whose "life has been devoted to the single-minded aim of strengthening the CPM" in West Bengal. The article pointed out PDG's genius for organisation but also his reputation for being a "shadowy figure" who is "blunt, abrasive and retiring by nature". For Sumit Mitra, writing in the Hindustan Times, "it was Dasgupta who pulled the strings, and Basu was the puppet."

Among the managerial skills he exhibited were thorough knowledge of CPI(M) grassroots organisations in West Bengal. "Promode da was an excellent manager. Even as he sat all by himself in his office room at the party headquarters at Calcutta and smoked his cigar," India Today quoted a party worker, "a well-oiled communication machinery brought to him exactly what was happening at various levels of the party so that he was rarely caught off guard." This knowledge enabled him to act as a mediator, brokering truces between conflicting groups within the CPI(M) and the various parties in the Left Front.

In the CPI(M) politburo, PDG often took hardline stances against the national leadership, especially in their desire to seek out alliances with non-Left parties. "Those who are not strong enough in their own rights have to go in for such exercises", he quipped. He also protected the positions of his West Bengal unit from the more moderate central politburo. Upon Dasgupta's death, Basu acknowledged the difficulty of his successor's task, both as chief organiser ("When he (Dasgupta) was there none of us had to bother about the organisation. Now we will have to work as a collective body.") and as politburo representative ("Promode babu enjoyed a special position in the politburo and it would be too much to hope that his successors will command the same respect.").

On the flip side, Dasgupta is routinely cast as "Stalinist" and "anti-intellectual" by commentators.

India Today wrote of his personal asceticism in 1978:

A man of frugal habits, Dasgupta has few worldly possessions. He lives simply in a single room provided by the party and has his meals at the common hall of the CPM district office at Alimuddin Street, off Lower Circular Road, Calcutta. Dressed in starched and spotless dhoti-kurta, his one weakness is his Castro-style cigar which he lights and relights as he talks. He has never married and has few family attachments. "Pramode Babu is married to the party," say his followers.
