= Purnendu Dastidar =

Bengali politician and lawyer

- পূর্ণেন্দু দস্তিদার
- Born: 20 June 1909; Dhalghat, Chittagong district, British India
- Died: 9 May 1971 (aged 61); Chittagong, Bangladesh
- Education: Chittagong College
- Political party: National Awami Party; Communist Party of East Pakistan
- Parents: Chandra Kumar Dastider (father); Kumudini Dastider (mother)

Purnendu Dastidar (Bengali: পূর্ণেন্দু দস্তিদার; 20 June 1909 – 9 May 1971) was a Bengali politician, writer and lawyer. A key leader of the Communist Party of East Pakistan, Dastidar was jailed for over two decades.

== Student years and revolutionary struggle ==
Dastidar was born in Dalghat village, Chittagong District. He was the son of Chandra Kumar Dastidar, an officer of the Chittagong Law Court. He passed his I.sc. exam from Chittagong College in 1927. He went on to study at the Jadavpur Engineering and Technology College. He was a member of the Chittagong Jugantar Party, and took part in guerrilla actions against British targets together with Surya Sen, Kalpana Dutta and Pritilata Waddedar. In 1931, during his student years in Calcutta, he was imprisoned. The British authorities charged him with being an associate of guerrilla leader Surya Sen. He was able to complete his B.A. and B.L. degrees whilst in jail. He was released from jail in 1938, but remained interned in his home village until 1941. From 1941 onward he began practising law.

== Community work ==
In Chittagong Dastidar founded the 'Babies Hospital', offering health care to poor children. During the years of war and famine 1942–1945, he organised relief efforts in Chittagong. He was also the organiser of relief efforts in 1947 following the sinking of S.S. Mallard near Cox's Bazar.

== Jailed legislator ==
Dastidar became a member of the Communist Party of Pakistan in 1948. He was arrested again, and jailed for seven years. In 1954, whilst in jail, he was elected to the East Pakistan Legislative Assembly from a minority reserved seat in Chittagong. He defeated Binod Bihari Dutta of the Congress party. Dastidar was released in 1956. In the Legislative Assembly he tabled a resolution calling for the construction of a memorial tower in honour of the Chittagong rebellion of 18 April 1930, which was passed by the assembly.

== NAP leader ==
Dastidar organised student, labour and peasants groups in Chittagong. In 1957 Dastidar became a member of the National Awami Party (NAP). Following the declaration of Martial Law in 1958, Dastidar was once again jailed. He was released in 1962. Upon his release from jail he became the president of the Chittagong City branch of NAP.

Along with other communist leaders, Dastidar was jailed at the time of the September 1965 Indo-Pakistan war. He was released in 1969, in connection with the ongoing mass protests which forced Ayub Khan to release all political prisoners. After being released he was active in the NAP of Wali Khan. He contested the Chittagong-11 in the provincial assembly elections of 1970, but lost to an Awami League candidate.

== 1971 Liberation War ==
As the Bangladesh Liberation War broke out in 1971 Dastidar left for India to join the struggle, but died of exhaustion en route.
