= Ashim Chatterjee =

Indian politician

Ashim Chatterjee (born 1944) is an Indian politician and a former Naxalite leader. He was a student of the then Presidency College, Kolkata, and leader of firstly Bengal Provincial Student's Federation (then student wing of Communist Party of India (Marxist)) and then student leader of Communist Party of India (Marxist-Leninist) in Calcutta. Chatterjee broke ranks with Charu Majumdar in 1971 after the failure of the attempts to build an armed movement in the Debra-Gopiballavbur area in West Bengal and due to the opposition of CPI(ML) towards the liberation struggle of Bangladesh. He was imprisoned during 1972–78. Chatterjee formed the Bengal-Bihar-Odisha Border Regional Committee, CPI(ML) as a separate faction. His group joined the CPI(ML) of Satyanarayan Singh. Later Chatterjee formed the Communist Revolutionary League of India.

He unsuccessfully contested West Bengal legislative assembly (Bidhan Sabha) elections twice - first as a Communist Party of India (Marxist) (CPI(M)) supported Independent and in 2006, as a Trinamool Congress supported candidate. He is popularly called as comrade Kaka.
