= Communist Revolutionary League of India =

- Founded: 1984
- Ideology: Communism
- Political position: Left-wing
- Regional affiliation: Left Front (1995–2000)

Communist Revolutionary League of India (CRLI) is a political party in the Indian state of West Bengal. The party is led by Ashim Chatterjee, former student leader of Communist Party of India (Marxist-Leninist). Chattejee broke with Charu Majumdar in 1971 after the failure of the attempts to build an armed movement in the Debra-Gopiballavbur area in West Bengal and due to the opposition of CPI (ML) towards the liberation struggle of Bangladesh. Chatterjee formed the Bengal-Bihar-Orissa Border Regional Committee, CPI (ML). His group joined the CPI (ML) of Satayanarayan Singh. Later Chatterjee formed the CRLI.

During the period of 1995-2000 CRLI was member of Left Front. After breaking with the Communist Party of India (Marxist) (CPI (M)), CRLI was in contact with the Party of Democratic Socialism of Saifuddin Chaudhury.

In the 2005 West Bengal Legislative Assembly elections, CRLI leader Chatterjee contested on the election symbol of Trinamool Congress.
