= Pannalal Halder =

Indian politician

Member of the West Bengal Legislative Assembly
- Incumbent
- Assumed office 2 May 2021
- Preceded by: Dipak Kumar Halder
- Constituency: Diamond Harbour

Personal details
- Born: South 24 Parganas district, West Bengal, India
- Party: Trinamool Congress
- Profession: Politician

Pannalal Halder is an Indian politician member of All India Trinamool Congress. He is an MLA, elected from the Diamond Harbour constituency in the 2021 West Bengal Legislative Assembly election.
