= Dipak Kumar Halder =

Indian politician

Dipak Kumar Halder (born 1966) is an Indian politician from West Bengal. He is a former member of the West Bengal Legislative Assembly from Diamond Harbour Assembly constituency in South 24 Parganas district. He won the 2016 West Bengal Legislative Assembly election representing the All India Trinamool Congress.

== Early life and education ==
Halder is from Diamond Harbour, South 24 Parganas district, West Bengal. He is the son of late Amal Kumar Halder. He worked as an insurance agent for LIC. He completed his BCom in 1985 at a college affiliated with Calcutta University.

== Career ==
Halder first became an MLA winning the 2011 West Bengal Legislative Assembly election from the Diamond Harbour Assembly constituency representing the All India Trinamool Congress. He polled 87,645 votes and defeated his nearest rival, Subhra Sau of the Communist Party of India (Marxist), by a margin of 20,774 votes. He retained the seat for the Trinamool Congress winning the 2016 West Bengal Legislative Assembly election where he defeated the Communist Party of India (Marxist) candidate Abdul Hasnat, by a margin of 15,037 votes. He polled 96,833 votes. In February 2021, he shifted to the Bharatiya Janata Party. He managed to get the nomination for the Diamond Harbour seat from BJP but lost the 2021 West Bengal Legislative Assembly election to Trinamool Congress candidate, Pannalal Halder by a margin of 16,996 votes.
