= Tarafdar =

Family name

Tarafdar (Bengali তরফদার; spelling variations: Taraphdar, Taraphder, Tarafder) is a Bengali surname. Literally it means "a person in charge of taraf".

The name is used by both Hindus and Muslims, with its origins tied to historical administrative roles.

== Meaning and origin ==
The surname "Tarafdar" is derived from two parts:

- "Taraf": word meaning "side," "direction," or "region".
- "Dar": A Persian suffix meaning "holder" or "possessor".

Together, "Tarafdar" can be interpreted as "one who holds or governs a region" or "administrator of a district."

== Historical significance ==
The role of a Tarafdar was historically important during the British Empire, particularly in Bengal, where individuals with this title were responsible for overseeing local territories, managing land, and collecting taxes. The position was often hereditary, passed down through generations.

== Religion ==
It is used by both Bengali Hindus and Bengali Muslims. Historically, the title was adopted by both groups, especially those in positions of authority or land management.
