= Mothers of the Revolution =

2021 film about an anti-nuclear protest, by Briar March

- Directed by: Briar March
- Written by: Matthew Metcalfe; Briar March
- Produced by: Matthew Metcalfe; Leela Menon
- Starring: Karmen Thomas; Rebecca Johnson; Chris Drake
- Narrated by: Glenda Jackson
- Cinematography: María Inés Manchego
- Edited by: Margot Francis; Simon Coldrick; John Gilbert; Tim Woodhouse
- Distributed by: Universal Studios, Inc.
- Release date: 2021
- Running time: 101 minutes
- Country: New Zealand
- Language: English

Mothers of the Revolution is a 2021 film directed by Briar March. It tells the story of the Greenham Common Women's Peace Camp, which was a protest that took place between 1981 and 2000 outside the RAF Greenham Common air base near Newbury, Berkshire in England. Several of those who participated in the protest were interviewed for the film, which was narrated by the actress and British parliamentarian, Glenda Jackson.

In 1981 Ann Pettitt, Karmen Cutler, Lynne Whittemore and Liney Seward from Cardiff in Wales, formed a group called Women for Life on Earth. They then decided to walk 120 miles to protest against the British Government's decision to allow US nuclear cruise missiles to be stored at the Royal Air Force base at Greenham Common. They left Cardiff on 27 August 1981 and arrived ten days later. There was, originally, no intention to remain at the base, but some of the participants felt that a march would soon be forgotten and that it was necessary to establish a permanent presence. This led to a nineteen-year protest, which some attribute to helping to bring about the end of the Cold War.

Media reporting largely provided a negative image of the protestors, ignoring the human stories of the women who stood up to what they saw as a very real threat to humanity and the growing obsession with nuclear weapons. Some papers labelled the women as "shrews", "harpies", "lesbians" and "communists". The film was designed to redress this negative picture of the Greenham Common protestors. It records events in an approximately chronological order, using interviews with women who were involved as well as dramatized segments to augment video from the 1980s. Songs by Greenham women and folk singers like Peggy Seeger, who was involved with the original march and the camp, are used. Among those interviewed for the film were Cutler, who described arriving with others at the camp only for a policeman to assume that they were the cleaners; Rebecca Johnson who discovered through the camp that she had the necessary skills to talk in public; and Chris Drake, who came out as a lesbian while at the camp and was forced to decide whether to leave the camp or give her ex-husband custody of her three children. Others interviewed included Lynette Edwell, Fran De'Ath, Evelyn Parker, the actress Julie Christie, who visited the camp, Zohl de Ishtar, and Titewhai Harawira.

Also interviewed was Olga Medvedkov, then a peace activist in the Soviet Union. In 1983 Cutler and Pettitt visited Moscow, together with Jean McCollister, a student of Russian studies and a linguist, where they met up with the "Group to Establish Trust Between the USSR and USA" (GTET), a group calling for the abolition of nuclear weapons, of which Medvekov was a leading member. When they went with her to meet the Soviet Peace Committee, she started her introduction but was interrupted by the committee's vice-president, Oleg Kharkhardin, who rebuked Cutler and Pettitt for taking Medvedkov to the meeting. McCollister was also interviewed for the film.

== Reception ==
The Guardian stated that the film was guaranteed to bring a tear to the eye of its more sentimental readers of a certain age. However, it questioned whether the use of actors in scenes that mimicked the look of early-1980s video footage was really required. RogerEbert.com shared this view, arguing that some re-creations range between superfluous and distracting. Yes! magazine considered the presence of Medvekov as one of the film's highlights. The 2021 New Zealand International Film Festival noted that "this extraordinary story shows how traditional ideas about mothering and womanhood were subverted as women faced down hostile locals, police, military, media and, ultimately, global superpowers to take their protest worldwide".
