= Frances Vigay =

British anti-nuclear activist

- Born: 1970 (age 55–56)
- Occupation: Mental health researcher
- Known for: Anti-nuclear activist, member of the Greenham Common Women's Peace Camp; fundraiser for mental health support
- Parent(s): Mavis and John Vigay

Frances Vigay (born 1970) is a former peace activist who was among the women who joined the Greenham Common Women's Peace Camp to protest against American nuclear armed cruise missiles being sited in Britain. She later founded a vegan food store and then became a mental health worker, supporting those with mental health problems and those who have suffered bereavement because of suicide.

== Work in support of mental health ==
In 2018, Vigay walked one thousand miles in Britain to raise money for the Samaritans, a charity that provides support to anyone in emotional distress, struggling to cope or at risk of suicide. This was done in memory of her brother, Paul Vigay, a computer programmer who died from apparent suicide in 2009. In 2023 she successfully completed a project to raise money for the charity "Grassroots Suicide Prevention" by photographing the sunrise every day of the year and sharing the photographs on her Facebook page. She regarded the sunrise as a metaphor for the light returning, pointing out that nighttime was often the hardest time for someone who was feeling depressed. She successfully challenged herself to not miss one sunrise. In 2024 she won a "Head Outside Award" for this activity. As of 2024 she was working as a researcher to gather information to provide a better understanding of how those bereaved by suicide are supported in the Portsmouth area.

== Business activities ==
In 2015 Vigay founded "Wild Thyme Wholefoods" in Southsea on the south coast of England. The company, which functioned as a workers' cooperative, was named Green Business of the Year by the Portsmouth News in 2018. However, it was forced to close in 2022 because of rising costs, such as higher energy bills. Vigay also noted that the cooperative had fallen victim to the rising popularity of vegan diets, which meant that customers could increasingly find what they needed in supermarkets, without having to seek out specialist shops.

== Greenham Common ==
The Greenham Common Women's Peace Camp was established in September 1981 to protest about the planned installation of missiles at RAF Greenham Common, near Newbury, Berkshire in England. The missiles arrived in 1983 and were removed in 1991 but some protestors stayed at the camp until 2000, turning their attention to nearby bases. In August 1993 some of these protestors decided to take action at the Atomic Weapons Establishment at Aldermaston on the anniversaries of the American Atomic bombings of Hiroshima and Nagasaki on 6 and 9 August 1945. The protestors cut the inner and outer fences at Aldermaston, and Vigay and seven other women from the Greenham Camp, Rosy Bremer, Sarah Hipperson, Katrina Howse, Aniko Jones, Jean Hutchinson, Mary Millington, and Peggy Walford, together with one woman who was visiting the camp, entered the establishment. They were arrested and charged under the Criminal Damage Act 1971. They did not appear in the magistrates’ court until February 1994. In the court a witness called for the defence, who gave evidence on the levels of plutonium from the establishment at Aldermaston, was not allowed to give his evidence in public.

The women were all found guilty and given a two-year conditional discharge. They decided to appeal at the Crown Court in Reading, but as, by this time, the number of women at the peace camp was very small and there was a possibility that they would be sent to prison, Jones and Howse, agreed to accept the verdict and return to the camp. The appeal did not take place for another 17 months, being held in July 1995. The case lasted ten days, with the women arguing that the weapons establishment was preparing for an act of genocide and that it produced radioactive contamination. The women claimed that this gave them a “lawful excuse” for their actions. Vigay argued before the court that while, perhaps, scientists at the establishment were able to separate their work from its implications, “I cannot turn off and live with it. Therefore, I have a responsibility to act and to face the unthinkable. It is harder to live with these weapons than to oppose them.” The women lost their case and a year later five, including Vigay, appealed to the High Court, which concluded that the production of nuclear weapons was as a deterrent and thus was not unlawful, that their production did not amount to the crime of genocide, nor conspiracy to commit genocide.

On 5 August 1999, Vigay, although no longer permanently at the camp, joined other women at Greenham on the tenth anniversary of the death of Helen Thomas who had been hit by a police vehicle while standing outside the main gate. Her death had been ruled as accidental by the coroner, although this was disputed by her family and many in the camp.
