= Alice Cook (peace activist) =

British anti-nuclear activist

- Cook at the RAF Greenham Common fence
- Born: Alice Cook; 8 March 1953; Oxford, England
- Died: 2023 (aged 69–70)
- Education: University of Sussex
- Occupation: Psychotherapist
- Known for: Activism against nuclear weapons at Greenham Common

Alice Cook (8 March 1953 – 2023) was a psychotherapist, writer, feminist and political activist, who was a member of the anti-nuclear Greenham Common Women's Peace Camp in the early 1980s and, together with Gwyn Kirk, wrote Greenham Women Everywhere: Dreams, Ideas and Actions from the Women's Peace Movement, which highlighted the anger that led women to take action against nuclear weapons.

== Early life ==
Cook was born on 8 March 1953 in Oxford, to Iris Golding, a music teacher, and Morris Cook, a history professor. She obtained a BA in English at Sussex University in 1973. In 2002 she was awarded a master's in psychotherapy from the Minster Centre in London.

== Career ==
Cook worked in the fields of health and wellness, particularly for women. She worked as a nurse and a health visitor and managed various mental health projects in London. She was also a volunteer with mentally ill patients and community health services in Batticaloa in Sri Lanka in 2010 and 2011. She moved to Stroud, Gloucestershire in 2016 and developed a psychotherapy practice there.

== Activism ==
In the early 1980s, Cook was involved in the Greenham Common women's peace movement. Following a march at the end of August and beginning of September 1981 from Cardiff to RAF Greenham Common near Newbury, Berkshire, organised by Ann Pettitt, Karmen Cutler and others who formed a group called "Women for Life on Earth" to protest against the planned arrival of US nuclear-armed cruise missiles at the base, some people from the march decided to stay at the base and form a camp. They were quickly joined by others and it was later decided that the camp should be women only.

In December 1982, on the third anniversary of NATO's decision to house nuclear missiles in Britain, 30,000 women joined hands around the base at the "Embrace the Base" event. This number was achieved by sending out 1000 copies of a handwritten, barely legible letter, asking the recipients to send a similar letter to ten more women. According to Cook:

I had been to the camp several times but had not taken an active part for a few months. The letter came out of the blue. … I didn't read so-called 'impartial' information in a newspaper. This was a personal communication addressed to me, requesting things of me, making it plain that every woman was included, was important. Not only did I copy the letter, but I spent a long time considering who to send it to. I didn't send it to women who I thought would hear about the action anyway, nor to women who would never go to such a demonstration. I sent letters to women I thought would be interested but had not become directly involved. I felt that the spur of a personal letter might spark off enthusiasm. As it turned out, several of these women were at Greenham on 12 December.

Together with Kirk she wrote Greenham Women Everywhere: Dreams, Ideas and Actions from the Women's Peace Movement, published in 1983, which highlighted the fear and anger that caused women to take the action they did against the nuclear arms race. The book remains widely available online. She had previously started a project about nuclear nightmares, prompted by her own dreams, inviting others to send her theirs. This was done through articles in magazines such as Sanity, the magazine of the Campaign for Nuclear Disarmament, and the feminist magazine, Spare Rib. Some of the dreams she received were included in the book. In 2016 a French translation of the book, Des Femmes Contre des Missiles, made a younger generation aware of the Greenham women. This, in turn, led Sonia Gonzalez to make an English-language documentary called Women Against the Bomb (2021), featuring Cook, Kirk, Clare Hudson, Rebecca Johnson, Pettitt, and others.

== Death ==
Cook died from breast cancer in 2023. She had one son, Jacob. In the last years of her life she was involved with climate-change activism with Extinction Rebellion.
