= Pine Gap Women's Peace Camp =

Peace camp in Northern Territory, Australia

- Part of the peace camps movement
- Date: November 1983
- Location: Alice Springs, Northern Territory, Australia
- Participants: Women for Survival

The Pine Gap Women's Peace Camp was a peace camp set up at Pine Gap, a joint Australian–United States satellite communications and signals intelligence surveillance base just outside of Alice Springs, Australia, in November 1983. The protest was coordinated by Women for Survival who staged a two week vigil outside the facility. These women felt that the base symbolised global violence and was a part of "a continuum of violence against women and children systemically embedded in patriarchy and imperialism".

Throughout the protests the women maintained a philosophy of collectivity, consensus and collaboration and used non-violent direct action.

== Background ==
The camp was organised by Women for Survival, an Australian national feminist peace coalition formed in 1983, which brought together various feminist peace groups from around the country in order to coordinate the protest. Planning for the protests begun at a Women's Peace Symposium held in Canberra in April 1983 in which Alice Springs was chosen as a location due to its central location and closeness to a reasonably sized town; there was also a local Alice Springs resident at the symposium who advocated for it as a location.

In planning for the protest, they had numerous aims, including to bring public attention to the secrecy of the bases activities and Australia's vulnerability as a nuclear target because of its presence. They also sought to demonstrate their support for other peace camps such as those at Greenham Common and at Comiso.

Some of the larger groups which joined Women for Survival were; Feminists Against Nuclear Energy (FANE), Feminist Anti-Nuclear Group (FANG), Women's Action for Nuclear Disarmament (WAND), Campaign Against Nuclear Energy (CANE) and Women's Action Against Global Violence (WAAGV).

Women for Survival also sought support locally in Alice Springs, including the Alice Springs Women's Peace Group, who were initially resistant to this national action happening there. A large part of this hesitancy was ensuring that the protest prioritised the inclusion of First Nations groups, particularly the Arrernte Traditional Owners, and ensuring that consent was sought and making clear that this wouldn't necessarily happen on a guaranteed timeline. There was, however, tension when it was declared that the protest would be 'women only' and that male Traditional Owners would not be allowed to participate. This was particularly significant as there are numerous sacred sites in and around Pine Gap, some of which are men's sites.

Later, once this consent was largely received the local peace group offered practical, on the ground support, which included help creating the infrastructure for the camp.

Despite the push from local organisers Women for Survival were also interested in having First Nations voices included, in part as a show of their support and respect for Aboriginal land rights, and they involved Aboriginal and Torres Strait Islander women from around Australia in the protests, this included Mum Shirl who, alongside a group of Pitjantjatjara women, led the marches at the start of the protests.

== The protest ==
The camp begun on 11 November 1983, chosen to intentionally coincide with Remembrance Day, and brought together 700 to 800 women from around Australia.

On 13 November 1983 when a large group of women entered the Pine Gap facility by cutting into a fence and held what they called a 'Boston Tea Party'; of the lawns which led to 111 women being arrested for trespass. Following their arrests they each gave the name 'Karen Silkwood', in a nod to anti-nuclear campaigner Karen Silkwood. Many of the women arrested said that they heard "terrifying" screams from the cells, that the women had bruises from their treatment and that they were denied water. Many of the women were also forcibly fingerprinted and strip-searched.

This mass arrest led to significant national and international coverage including complaints regarding police mistreatments and intimidation and this was later followed by a human rights enquiry and another by the Northern Territory Ombudsman. It was also revealed in 2023, when documents were opened by the National Archives of Australia, that ASIO had been monitoring the peace protests, including their meetings and by sending covert operatives to the protest.

A visitor to the camp was Rosemary Crowley, a then senator for South Australia, who wished to show her support.

The size of the camp was smaller in the second week and sat at approximately 250 women as people had to return to other commitments. However, as one woman stated "[w]e've made our point" and that:

What's been really positive has been the amazing unity that has developed. We're all here for the same reason, even though we come from different political positions. That's made it a really confronting time for all of us

— Vicki Gordon, via the Tribune

Many local people living in Alice Springs disapproved of the protest with a local radio station 8HA doing a call out for people's reactions to it and 812 of 820 called in to say they disapproved.

== LGBT impact on Alice Springs ==
Many of the protestors at the camp settled in Alice Springs afterwards and, an unanticipated result of this, was that it dramatically increased the lesbian population of the town. Alice Springs is now considered a regional lesbian capital of Australia and it has a generally female dominated population.

Carmen Robinson, who moved to Alice Springs many years after the protests said:

It didn't just attract lesbians, a lot of straight women came to Pine Gap and ended up leaving as lesbians. You got the type of people who were already interested in social justice [and] a lot of women came here because they were in solidarity with Aboriginal people, because they also knew what it was like to be oppressed. They came to show solidarity for other oppressed groups. There's a sort of magic and liveliness in those circles—people who are very liberated and rebellious are more free in their sexuality.

— Carmen Robinson, "How a US Spy Base turned Alice Springs into an LGBTIQ Paradise" (2019) via Vice

== Collections ==
A large collection of ephemera relating to the protests, including photographs, posters, banners and memorabilia, is held at the Jessie Street National Women's Library. They used this material in 2009 to stage an exhibition at the NSW Parliament House entitled Remembering Pine Gap.

== See also ==
- Faslane Peace Camp
- Greenham Common Women's Peace Camp
- Seneca Women's Encampment for a Future of Peace and Justice
- Women for Life on Earth
- Women Strike for Peace
