= Fran De'Ath =

British anti-nuclear activist

Fran De'Ath, a Quaker, is a former member of the Greenham Common Women's Peace Camp. She became well-known because of a photograph by Edward Barber in which she is seen sitting in a canvas chair next to a sign saying "Hello. Can you stop for a talk?" She and Annie Tunnicliffe, also at the camp, set up the "National Network of Non-Violence Trainers". De'Ath later became an international observer of elections around the world.

== Activism ==
De'Ath, who had left school at a young age, first learned about the Greenham Common camp from a male friend. She was living in Bristol, which had been on the route of the Women for Life on Earth march from Cardiff to RAF Greenham Common near Newbury, Berkshire that led to the setting up of the camp. As part of an anti-nuclear group in Bristol she was surprised that she had not been aware of the march. It turned out that local women's groups had been contacted by the organisers, Ann Pettitt and Karmen Cutler, but had declined to help because there were a few men on the march.

At the time she was divorced and her children, who were five and 12, were living with their father. Before learning about Greenham Common camp, she had been planning on making a tipi and going to live in the wilds. She took the tipi to the camp, finishing it with the help of her boyfriend. She then set about inviting people in Newbury to tea in her tipi. A local shop gave her a dozen tea mugs for free. After explaining to the manager of another store what the purpose of the camp was, he gave her chains and bolt cutters to cut the perimeter fence of the base. De'Ath also travelled to the United Nations in Geneva to represent the camp, attended committee meetings in London with politician such as Tony Benn and Robin Cook, and gave talks around the country, including in Manchester Town Hall and at the Glastonbury Festival. In 1984 she visited Moscow and spent two hours with some top Soviet officials and also met with a group of dissidents, to the annoyance of the KGB, the Soviet Union's secret police. She also went to Vancouver, Canada to study conflict resolution. She briefly became one of the signatories on the peace camp's bank account but her name was mysteriously removed while she was absent.

After a short time, she moved away from the camp at the main entrance to the base because, as she saw it, there were too many attempts by feminists to control activities. She lived alone in her tipi near the works entrance. One night she was woken by two youths on motor bikes going round and round her tent. She invited them into the tipi for tea: after that they would bring her food every week. She began to sit near the works entrance with a sign asking the workers if they would like to have a talk, dressed in a Barbour jacket, which she felt would mean that she would be taken more seriously. Her aim was to talk to the men constructing the silos for missiles to help them understand the seriousness of what they were doing. The front of her sign said "Hello. Can you stop for a talk?" and on the back was written "A chat on your way out then?" She became friendly with the police and invited them into her tipi for tea. She has described how well treated she was when arrested for obstructing the work of workers on the camp perimeter and that she was even invited to have a bath at a policeman's house.

Several photographers took her picture, including Edward Barber. His photo appeared in The Observer magazine in December 1982, as well as in his 1984 book, Peace Moves: Nuclear Protest In The 1980s. It has been on show at London's Imperial War Museum, and is one of two of Barber's photographs that are sold in the museum's shop.

== After Greenham ==
De'Ath eventually left the camp, frustrated with what she called "feminist fascism", and went to work for the Campaign for Nuclear Disarmament in London. She subsequently joined the United Nations and helped to draft the Afghanistan electoral law, and became an international elections observer, working in Albania, South Africa, and Timor-Leste during the country's Independence Referendum, which was met with a punitive campaign of violence by East Timorese Pro-Indonesia militia supported by elements of the Indonesian military. This left De'Ath suffering from post-traumatic stress disorder, although she did eventually return to Timor to assist with nation building.
