= Georgina Smith =

British anti-nuclear weapon campaigner and artist (1929–2024)

- Born: 1 December 1929; Scotland
- Died: 13 April 2024 (aged 94); Ardnamurchan, Scotland
- Education: Ruskin School of Art
- Occupations: Artist and peace campaigner

Georgina Smith (1 December 1929 – 13 April 2024) was a Scottish artist and peace campaigner, particularly noted for her work with the Greenham Common Women's Peace Camp, which was a series of protest camps established to protest against American nuclear weapons being placed at RAF Greenham Common in Berkshire, England. Returning to her home country of Scotland, she later became involved with the Faslane Peace Camp at the Faslane Naval Base in Argyll and Bute, Scotland, which is home to British nuclear submarines armed with Trident missiles.

== Early life ==
Smith was born in the west of Scotland on 1 December 1929. She spent her early years in Scotland before going to art school in London in the 1940s, and later studying at Ruskin School of Drawing and Fine Art in Oxford. She married after her art training and she and her husband had five children. Her opposition to nuclear weapons began with her participation in the first of the Aldermaston marches, in 1958. Organized by the Campaign for Nuclear Disarmament (CND) the marches went from the Atomic Weapons Establishment at Aldermaston in Berkshire to London.

== Greenham Common ==
Smith was active in the CND in the 1960s and 1970s. In the 1980s, when she was living at Leamington Spa, she joined the women at the Greenham Common camp where she took part in non-violent direct action activities, such as blocking access to the military base, resulting in 14 incarcerations in various prisons. Prosecuted at Newbury Magistrates Court for fence-cutting and trespassing at Greenham, she, along with Jean Hutchinson and Sarah Hipperson, challenged the RAF Greenham Common by-laws, made under a statutory instrument. After a five-year legal battle, which went to the House of Lords, at that time the Supreme Court of the United Kingdom, they won their argument that the fence was illegal because it breached common land rights, Greenham being an ancient 12th-century common. This contributed to the departure of the US air force and nuclear-armed Cruise missiles, and prevented the British government from converting the base into a training ground. In 2000, the fence was removed, the runway dug up, and the protest sites became a memorial peace garden. Several hundred women had been convicted for trespassing under the law that was declared invalid and were then able to seek redress for wrongful conviction.

== Faslane ==
In 1989, Smith returned to Scotland, to the Ardnamurchan Peninsula. There, she restored on her own a dilapidated crofter's cottage. The area around it was completely barren but she planted saplings that grew into mature trees. Shifting her focus to Faslane Naval Base, she purchased the 34-acre Peaton Wood near the base from the Ministry of Defence. The wood was used as a "peace camp" by activists opposed to the Trident missiles at Faslane but she ran into difficulties with local residents and the authorities because of laws relating to how long such land could be used for camping. After lengthy planning battles she obtained a licence to make her ground a public campsite on 29 days of the year.

Smith used her artistic skills to add graffiti to the walls of a bridge over the West Highland Line at Faslane station, so that she and the other passengers could see her handiwork. The graffiti had always been removed by her return. When she and Helen John were arrested at the protest they were subjected to a new police practice of holding protesters overnight as if they had to go to court in the morning, and then releasing them after 30 hours of custody, with no trial. To express their opposition to this they went to Edinburgh, the Scottish capital, and painted messages on the High Court building on 11 November 2006, including: "Ban cluster-bombs. UK values, what values? Honour the living. All bases out. Respect the war dead. No war crimes. £76 billion for genocide." This was a protest against what they saw as the High Court's complicity in the illegal deployment of nuclear weapons. The High Court had ruled in 2000 that Trident was legal even though the International Court of Justice had ruled in 1996 that the threat and use of nuclear weapons would generally be illegal.

Smith and John each spent 45 days in prison for their actions, after refusing to pay their fines. At the beginning of 2011, Smith, at the age of 81, was sentenced to a further 45 days for refusing to pay compensation for the cost of removing the graffiti and John to 40 days. They were released after 13 days when an anonymous benefactor paid the money. Smith had mixed feelings about this. While expressing gratitude to the benefactor, she stated: "when we do these actions, we want to take responsibility for them ourselves, even if that means going to prison".

== Art ==
Smith's artistic output included many lino prints, which she created using simple tools and materials, such as floor lino from her house, a Stanley knife, a dessert spoon, ink and paper. Much of her artwork was related to her campaigning activities. A retrospective exhibition of her work was held at the Glasgow Women's Library in 2023.

== Death ==
Smith died on 13 April 2024. She lived in her cottage until her death.
