= Kleckner =

Kleckner is a surname. Notable people with the surname include:

- John Kleckner (born 1978), American artist
- Nancy Kleckner (fl. from 1968), American molecular biologist
- Susan Kleckner (1941–2010), American feminist filmmaker
