= Evelyn Parker =

English peace activist

Evelyn Parker was a resident of Newbury, Berkshire, England who supported the women at the Greenham Common Women's Peace Camp, which was a protest against American nuclear-armed cruise missiles being based at RAF Greenham Common. The camp lasted from 1981 to 2000.

== Support to the Greenham Common protest ==
At the end of 1979 the people of Newbury were told that the cruise missiles would be based at RAF Greenham Common. The British Secretary of State for Defence, Frances Pym, spoke at a public meeting to reassure the people of the town that it would be safe. Parker joined the Newbury Campaign Against Cruise Missiles, which was started by the Labour Party and was closely involved with the Campaign for Nuclear Disarmament. She has criticised that campaign as being too focussed on general disarmament issues rather than the objections of the people of Newbury about having a base sited there.

The Greenham Common peace camp was established following a march by women and a few men from Cardiff, starting on 27 August 1981 and lasting for ten days. The marchers had not planned to stay at RAF Greenham Common and were ill-prepared to do so. Parker and others active in the Newbury campaign supplied them with tents, blankets and food and also enlisted support from supporters elsewhere in the south of England. A Quaker, Parker was one of a relatively few local people who provided full-time support to the women of the peace camp. Additionally, at the Friends meeting house in Newbury the Quakers installed a washing machine and a shower. There was considerable local opposition to the camp with people from Newbury forming an organisation called Ratepayers Against Greenham Encampments (RAGE) which often harassed members of the camp. She lived three miles from the camp and made available her phone and her bath for the protestors to use. She also provided a parking area where cars and caravans could be left. She took part in some of the camp's activities, including cutting the perimeter fence of the base with bolt cutters, referred to by the women as "black cardigans", and being arrested several times, but never stayed at the camp, feeling that she would be more useful at home.

The women at Greenham camp were subjected to frequent evictions as the land on which they camped was owned by Newbury District Council, which appointed a team of bailiffs to go round the camp and remove anything on council-owned land. After the bailiffs had left the women moved back. As they had to leave the land quickly when the bailiffs arrived they had minimal possessions and the only way they survived was to be constantly resupplied with new furniture, blankets, and food all the time. People all over the United Kingdom donated items. Parker stored the women's possessions in her house to prevent them being taken away when the bailiffs arrived at the camp.

In 1984, after all the missiles have been flown in, they began to be taken out of the base at night to practice the dispersion of missiles that was planned in the event of a nuclear war. An informal group in the south of England, called “Cruise Watch”, was established to monitor the movement of the missile convoys. Parker was one of a small group of women, including Lynette Edwell, who, using the telephone tree method, would alert the surrounding peace groups when the missiles left the base so that those groups could block roads and carry out other direct action. The purpose was to make nonsense of the idea that the missiles could go out in secret and disappear into the countryside without anyone knowing. The convoys were intercepted by protestors on nearly every occasion that they went out. Parker, herself, would sometimes go out with friends and interrupt the convoys and throw paint at them.

== After Greenham ==
The camp continued until 2000, even though the missiles were removed in 1988. Parker continued to be involved. In August 2000, Parker became one of the three company directors of the Nuclear Information Service (NIS), an independent, non-profit research organisation which investigates the UK nuclear weapons programme She left this role in July 2013. She was interviewed for the 2021 film Mothers of the Revolution about the Greenham camp, which was directed by Briar March and narrated by the British actress and politician, Glenda Jackson.
