= Eunice Stallard =

UK woman political and community activist

- Born: 1917
- Died: 2011 (aged 93)
- Known for: Political and community activist

Eunice Stallard (1917–2011) was a political and community activist in Wales. She was active in the Labour Party, involved in several peace movements, notably at Greenham Common in 1981 and organised community support during the 1984 - 1985 miner's strike. A Purple Plaque to mark her life was installed in Ystradgynlais in 2020.

== Personal life ==
Stallard lived in Ystradgynlais and owned a shop. She died in 2011, aged 93.

== Activism ==
Stallard was active in both politics and the peace movement. Her activism provided a role model for others. She was involved in the Greenham Common Women's Peace Camp from its start in 1981. She walked the approximately 100 miles from Cardiff to Newbury in late August, early September 1981 to draw attention to the proposed installation of nuclear weapons at RAF Greenham Common. Her activity as a member of the Women for Life on Earth group led to others joining its protest. In 2003 she was a member of the Grannies for Peace movement that protested against the Iraq war outside RAF Fairford.

During the coalminer's strike in 1984 - 1985 she had a key role in South Wales for fund-raising and distribution of food while based at the Miners Welfare Hall in Ystradgynlais that provided support for all those in the Upper Swansea Valley.

The foundation of her activism was concern for the welfare of children and the future.

== Awards ==
In 2020 a Purple Plaque was installed at the Miners Welfare Hall, Ystradgynlais to mark Stallard's life and activity as a peace campaigner. The application to install this plaque had earlier been allowed by Ystradgynlais town council.
