= Silver Moon =

Silver Moon may refer to:

- Silver Moon (album), a 2012 album by Donkeyboy
- Silver Moon Bookshop, a defunct feminist bookshop in London
- Silvermoon Drive-in, a drive-in theatre in Lakeland, Florida
- "Silver Moon" (Michael Nesmith song), 1970
- Silver Moon (peace activist) (born 1952), Australian peace activist, feminist and environmentalist
- Silver Moon (ship), a cruise ship operated by Silversea
- "Silver Moon" (David Sylvian song), 1986

== See also ==
- Silver moony, a tropical fish
