= Paul Vigay =

British computer programmer (1964–2009)

- Born: 24 October 1964; Croydon
- Died: 20 February 2009 (aged 44); Portsmouth
- Known for: Crop circles, RISC OS, UFOs
- Scientific career
- Fields: Computing

Paul Vigay (24 October 1964 – 20 February 2009) was a British computer consultant, notable for work in developing and supporting RISC OS software and named as a leading expert on UFOs and crop circles.

== Biography ==
Vigay was born on 24 October 1964 in Croydon. His sister, Frances Vigay, became an anti-nuclear campaigner at the Greenham Common Women's Peace Camp. He attended the Horndean School in Waterlooville, passing 10 O-Levels. His use of BBC B computers while there led to a lifelong interest in computing. He edited the Acorn section of the Micronet 800 on-line magazine in the late 1980s, and continued to support RISC OS users after Micronet 800 was withdrawn. He was the senior computer technician at Bohunt Community School for several years, maintaining a LAN of over 300 desktops around the school, until he worked for Argonet ISP from 1995 until 2005 when he opened Orpheus Internet to serve Argonet's previous customers and continue support for RISC OS users. He was also a skilled computer programmer, creating an anti-virus app and a lottery prediction app using statistical analysis, among others. According to BBC News, Vigay had a long interest in UFOs, hauntings and the occult and first became involved with crop circles in 1990 while developing equipment to detect electric current flow behind walls and floors. He contributed research for the 2002 film Signs.

== Death ==
Vigay's body was found off Portsmouth beach on 20 February 2009 after being reported missing the previous evening. Police said that it remained unclear whether Vigay committed suicide or died accidentally. According to a hearing at Portsmouth Coroners Court, Vigay had split up with girlfriend Andrea Smith on the night of his death. Smith found a short note Vigay left which said "I love you," and included Vigay's telephone code and computer passwords. The British newspaper The Telegraph reported that a coroner termed his death a "mystery". He was buried at The South Downs Natural Burial Site near Petersfield.
