= Jean Hutchinson =

British anti-nuclear weapon campaigner

Jean Hutchinson is a Welsh anti-nuclear weapons protestor. She was at the Greenham Common Women's Peace Camp for almost two decades, from 1981 to 2000, and was among the last women to leave the camp, which was set up to protest against American cruise missiles being based in the UK. She was imprisoned over 15 times for her protest actions.

== Activism ==
The camp began on 5 September 1981 after a group of women from Wales formed Women for Life on Earth decided to go there to protest against the decision of the British government to allow the missiles to be stored there. The first direct action was in the same month when 36 women chained themselves to the fence. Hutchinson, from Wales, arrived at the Greenham Common protest in its first three weeks. In the camp's early years she experienced "vicious and dangerous" evictions, being lashed with ropes and thrown in a ditch by bailiffs. There were daily or nightly activities, particularly after the missiles began to arrive. Her early activities included trying to block access to the base and to block the exit of the missiles on trucks, because there was a policy to disperse the missiles in the countryside. She would later say that the handling of the missiles was very unsafe because if she could find out in advance when a lorry was due to leave, so could any terrorist.

In 1983, Hutchinson and 13 others filed a suit against the US Government in a federal court in New York. The suit, eventually unsuccessful because it was deemed to be "political", sought an injunction to stop cruise missiles being sent to England, arguing that deployment of the missiles violated international law forbidding the aggressive use of weapons that did not distinguish between civilians and military personnel, and denied US constitutional rights to life and liberty. She took part in a protest at Williams International in Walled Lake, Michigan, a company that was producing engines for cruise missiles, where she was arrested for conspiracy. She experienced further difficulties when her visa expired while she was waiting for court proceedings to take place.

Hutchinson and others began to cut holes in the perimeter fencing of RAF Greenham Common. They argued that the base was on ancient 12th-century common land, which the British government had had no right to expropriate, and thus they had every right to access the land. Prosecuted at West Berkshire Magistrates Court on 23 July 1986 for fence-cutting and trespassing she, along with Georgina Smith, challenged the RAF Greenham Common by-laws, made under a statutory instrument. After a four-year legal battle, which went to the House of Lords, at that time the Supreme Court of the United Kingdom, on 12 July 1990 they won their argument that the fence was illegal because it breached common land rights. Most of the legal arguments were made by the women themselves, without the assistance of lawyers.

The women divided into several camps around the base. The first, and largest, was called "Yellow Gate" and others included "Blue Gate" with a New Age focus; "Violet Gate" with a religious focus; the "Orange Gate", which sought to address racism, apartheid and imperialism, and the "Green Gate", which was women-only and did not accept any male visitors. Hutchinson was based at the "Yellow Gate", the last to close. During the 1987 Moscow World Congress on Women, disagreements arose between representatives of different camps at Greenham, causing some enmity between the groups. The title of the congress was "Towards the Year, 2000— Without Nuclear Weapons! For Peace, Equality, Development!", and was designed to discuss non-aligned disarmament. By the third day tempers had frayed. Jean Hutchinson, who was present, reported that when Wilmette Brown, the Campaign for Nuclear Disarmament's (CND) anti-racist co-ordinator, from the Orange Camp, took the floor several of the other Greenham women walked out.

After leaving Greenham Common, she planned to retire from activism when she reached 60 but when she did not have any case before the courts she found that she had "never felt so miserable". She then became involved in a court case for cutting the fence around the Atomic Weapons Establishment in Aldermaston.

== Private life ==
Hutchinson is a Methodist lay preacher. She is married to an artist. He is a pacifist and her son and one daughter have also been active in the peace movement, with her husband and son being arrested. She has said that the main problem with her activism is that she never has any money. Her husband has been declared bankrupt at least once.
