= Fionn Stevenson =

British architect and anti-nuclear activist

- Born: Fiona Stevenson; March 1959 (age 67)
- Occupation: Architect
- Known for: Head of Architecture at the University of Sheffield; Anti-nuclear activist and member of the Greenham Common Women's Peace Camp

Fionn (Fiona) Stevenson is an Anglo-German former Head of Architecture at the University of Sheffield. One of twelve Royal Institute of British Architects (RIBA) "role models", her research work focuses on developing innovative methods of building performance evaluation. An anti-nuclear weapons activist, anarchist, and feminist she was a member of the Greenham Common Women's Peace Camp and played the saxophone and flute in the Fallout Marching Band, which often performed at anti-war events in Britain and Europe.

== Early life and education ==
Stevenson was born in March 1959. Her father was English and her mother German. In Germany she was seen as being English and vice versa. She recalled going to primary school in England wearing her traditional German leather trousers and being called a Nazi. Consequently, she was politicised from a young age. Her German grandmother, regarded by Stevenson as an early role model, was a politician who fought to regenerate her part of her town. Stevenson studied architecture at the University of Cambridge between 1978 and 1981, and obtained a post-graduate degree in architecture from the University of Sheffield in 1985. She obtained a PhD in architecture from the University of Dundee in 2006.

== Peace activism ==
After graduating from Cambridge, Stevenson worked briefly in Earl's Court, where she was as a Short Life Housing Association Manager, and lived in Brixton, both in London. Her membership of the Fallout Marching Band alerted her to the activities at the Greenham Common Women's Peace Camp near Newbury, Berkshire in England, which was protesting about the impending arrival of American nuclear-armed cruise missiles at RAF Greenham Common, and she moved there in June 1982. Using her architectural knowledge she designed a tree-friendly tree house which was held in the tree by ropes rather than using nails, drawing on her knot-tying experience as a sailor. She also worked with the development of "benders", which were tents made with saplings or flexible tree branches that were bent and fixed in the ground, before being covered with tarpaulins and other coverings. On New Year's Day 1983, a group of women entered the base by placing ladders against the fence, covering the barbed wire on top with blankets. By this time the camp had become women-only so the Fallout Marching Band could not contribute, but Stevenson and other women formed a small group of musicians that played and sang all the time the other women were entering the base.

After this event Stevenson decided that direct action could be more effective by going to the source of the missiles, which was the Boeing factory at Seattle, on the west coast of the US. She talked to women's peace groups there about the activities and tactics at Greenham Common, providing advice on how to set up a peace camp. The Puget Sound Women's Peace Camp in Kent, Washington was officially opened in June 1983, on a site directly across the road from the Boeing Aerospace Center. On 26 September 1983 five women were arrested following an incursion into the Boeing compound. The camp closed in 1985. After talking to the women in Seattle, Stevenson then went to the Vandenberg Air Force Base northwest of Los Angeles, where, at the end of March 1983, she was one of 800 women arrested following non-violent direct actions outside and inside the base. She was held inside the base for two days. Returning to the UK, she continued to carry out actions at Greenham Common and to play with the Fallout Marching Band, before returning to university in Sheffield in October 1983.

== Career ==
After leaving Sheffield University in 1985, Stevenson worked in the estates department of Lancashire County Council, where she was the only woman in a department of 200 men. She helped set up the council's first 3D digital design unit using RUCAPS (Really Universal Computer-Aided Production System). During this time she qualified as a chartered architect and completed her first building, a children's nursery at Nelson, Lancashire. She then joined Assist Architects in Glasgow where she was responsible for designing and managing a wide range of community design projects, including new-build affordable housing and retrofits. At the same time she was teaching architecture part time at the University of Strathclyde. From 1993 she lectured in architecture at the Edinburgh College of Art, moving on to Robert Gordon University in Aberdeen between 1995 and 2000. There she founded and led the new Ecological Design Group (EDG), which, among other activities, developed the first database of ecological construction products and materials in the Highlands and Islands, leading on to Scotland's first Green Materials Directory. Between 1989 and 1992 Stevenson was a director of the Woodlands Community Development Trust and in 1994-95 she served as a director of the Glasgow Steiner School.

Between 2000 and 2007, Stevenson became a senior lecturer in sustainable design at Dundee University, where she completed her part-time PhD in 2005. Among her activities was the production as co-author of the first Sustainable Housing Design Guide for Scotland in 2000 together with Nick Wiiliams, a planner. Between 2007 and 2011 she was co-director of the Low Carbon Building Unit of the Oxford Institute for Sustainable Development at Oxford Brookes University. In 2011 she moved to Sheffield University as professor of sustainable design, carrying out international research projects on the building performance evaluation of housing. She became head of the university's School of Architecture in 2013. In 2017 and 2018 she was a visiting professor at the University of British Columbia in Canada. In 2021 she served as campaigns director for the Building Performance Network (BPN), a not-for-profit national programme run by the Sustainable Development Foundation.

== Publications ==
Stevenson has published over 100 articles in refereed publications, as sole or joint author. She has also contributed articles to the Architects' Journal. In 2019 she published Housing Fit for Purpose, a book that examines the challenges facing the design, construction and management of housing. In it, she distils her original research for the benefit of built environment professionals, arguing that learning from feedback should be taking place at every stage of the housing project lifecycle.

== Opposition to tree felling ==
From 2014 Stevenson was a member of a successful campaign to stop Sheffield City Council felling a large number of trees in the city. The successful community campaign generated new local and national government policy guidelines on urban tree management. Although ultimately successful, Stevenson and others faced a ban from carrying out non-violent direct action in the city. She contributed a chapter on Sheffield to a book entitled The Politics of Street Trees by Jan Woudstra and Camilla Allen.
