= Briar March =

New Zealand documentary film director

Briar March is a New Zealand freelance film director, cinematographer, editor and educator who is mainly known for her documentaries. Her work has included films on climate change, anti-nuclear protestors in the UK, and on the New Zealand Olympic gold medal-winning athlete, Valerie Adams.

== Career ==
March released her first feature documentary, Allie Eagle and Me, about the feminist artist Allie Eagle, in 2004. With this film she became the youngest filmmaker to have had a feature premiere at the New Zealand International Film Festival. In that year, she obtained a Bachelor in Fine Arts from the Elam School of Fine Arts of the University of Auckland. Her documentary on climate change, There Once Was an Island, was shown at over 50 festivals and won several awards. She then studied for a Master of Fine Arts at Stanford University in California, as a Fulbright scholar. In 2009 she directed the television series Kete Aronui. In the academic year 2011-12 she was responsible for designing and teaching courses on cinematography, documentary production, video production, and documentary history at the Florida Atlantic University. On returning to New Zealand she made a social housing documentary called A Place to Call Home.

March has worked as a television editor, production manager, and cinematographer on both fiction and documentary films. In 2013 she worked for Attitude Pictures Ltd making television documentaries about people living with disabilities. Since then she has been a freelance director, initially making a feature documentary for Maori Television. In 2017 she made a film called The Coffin Club about people in New Zealand preparing their own coffins. Having previously worked as an editor on films that looked at New Zealand's Nuclear Free protests, she directed Mothers of the Revolution, a documentary on the women at the Greenham Common Women's Peace Camp in England, released in 2021. She then made a film about champion shot-putter Valerie Adams, which was released in 2022.

== Films ==
Films that March has directed are:

- Allie Eagle and Me (2004).
- There Once was an Island: Te Henua a Nnoho (2010), is on the subject of climate change climate change. Four years in production the film looks at the Takuu Atoll of Papua New Guinea, where rising sea levels forced people to consider leaving their homeland.
- Michael and His Dragon (2010), a documentary short set in San Francisco.
- Sick Wid It (2010), a documentary short.
- Promenade (2010), a documentary short.
- Smoke Songs (2011), a documentary short.
- A Place to Call Home (2016) traces Housing New Zealand's developments affecting Auckland's Glen Innes suburb and the town of Kaitaia in the Far North District of New Zealand.
- The Coffin Club (2017). This is a story about preparing for death, which attracted significant international attention, with the BBC, The Guardian and National Geographic all interviewing some of the participants who were members of a build-your-own-coffin club.
- Mothers of the Revolution, on the Greenham Common Women's Peace Camp in England.
- Dame Valerie Adams: More than Gold, a feature documentary about the gold medal-winning New Zealand shot putter's final Olympic campaign at the Tokyo Olympics.

== Awards ==
March has received over 30 international awards and nominations, including:

- 2012 One World Media Awards (United Kingdom). Winner - Sustainable Development Section for There Once Was An Island: Te Henua e Nnoho
- 2011 Rome International Film Festival, (United States), Best Documentary - International Section: There Once Was An Island: Te Henua e Nnoho
- 2011 Kuala Lumpur Eco Film Festival (Malaysia), Best Film: There Once Was An Island: Te Henua e Nnoho
- 2011 CineAmbiente Environmental Film Festival (Italy), Best International Documentary: There Once Was an Island: Te Henua e Nnoho
- 2011 Cinema Planeta - International Environmental Film Festival (Mexico), Grand Jury Prize: There Once Was an Island: Te Henua e Nnoho
- 2011 San Francisco DocFest - Documentary Film Festival (United States), Audience Award - Short Film Section: Smoke Songs
- 2010 Qantas Film and Television Awards (New Zealand), Best Editing - Documentary/Factual Programme (shared with Prisca Bouchet): for There Once Was an Island: Te Henua E Nnoho
- 2010 SPADA Screen Industry Awards (Screen Production and Development Association, New Zealand), New Filmmaker of the Year
- 2010 FIFO - Oceanian International Documentary Film Festival (Tahiti), Grand Prize: There Once Was An Island: Te Henua e Nnoho
- 2010 Sehsüchte International Student Film Festival (Germany), Best Documentary Short: Michael and His Dragon
- 2010 Dok Leipzig (Documentary and Animation Festival, Germany), Leipziger Award: There Once Was an Island: Te Henua e Nnoho
- 2010 Raindance Film Festival (United Kingdom), Best Documentary: There Once Was an Island: Te Henua e Nnoho
- 2010 CineFest Miskolc International Film Festival (Hungary), Best Documentary: There Once Was an Island: Te Henua e Nnoho
