= Lynette Edwell =

British anti-nuclear activist

Lynette Edwell (born 1940) was a member of the Greenham Common Women's Peace Camp, which was a protest, between 1981 and 2000, against US nuclear-armed cruise missiles being sited in the UK. Living close to the RAF Greenham Common base near Newbury, Berkshire, she supported other protestors with accommodation, baths, food, and access to office facilities. She played an important role in monitoring the movement of the missiles around the countryside.

== Early life ==
Edwell was born in Calcutta, India in 1940. She never met her father, a surgeon, who died in the Fall of Singapore to Japanese forces in February 1942. She attended a Catholic school run by nuns, with whom she was often in conflict. Later she was to discover that many of the women at Greenham Common shared her convent school background. After moving to England, she married and bought a house in Newbury in 1978. Her husband was a journalist with the Daily Mail and she worked as a journalist with the Horticultural Trades Association. They had four children.

== Activism ==
Shortly after moving to Newbury she discovered that there were plans for RAF Greenham Common, which had been de-activated in 1964, to be used by the United States Air Force to host Boeing KC-135 Stratotanker airborne refuelling planes. Local residents campaigned against this, for economic rather than moral reasons as the operation of the large and noisy planes would have affected their property prices. Edwell was responsible for the press campaign against their deployment and the base for the planes was eventually moved to RAF Fairford.

The British and American governments then decided that Greenham Common should be one of the bases for cruise missiles. Newbury's member of parliament, Joan Ruddock, and others formed the Newbury Campaign against Cruise Missiles. As a member of the campaign, Edwell joined the small group of local campaigners to receive the anti-nuclear protest march from Cardiff on 5 September 1981. When some of the marchers decided to stay and establish the peace camp, she and others assisted them with food and tents. Her home was very close to the base and rapidly became a centre of operations, with women and children sleeping there, campers visiting to take a bath or use the telephone, and her typewriter being used constantly. In January 1982 Helen John, one of the unofficial leaders of the Greenham Common camp, stayed with Edwell for several days to avoid arrest.

Edwell took on the responsibility of monitoring the court cases that the women faced. Most of the women decided not to pay fines but to accept prison terms instead. She went to court to support those who had been charged. The numerous hearings clogged up the legal system in Newbury and many were moved to other locations further away. She helped some of the women prepare their defences.

The protestors at Greenham Common knew that cruise missiles were going to arrive but didn’t know exactly when this would happen. They were warned of the imminent arrival of the missiles by a whistleblower in the Foreign and Commonwealth Office, Sarah Tisdall. Tisdall would be sentenced to six months in prison for sending this information to The Guardian. As this was before mobile phones, a telephone tree was established to alert people to the arrival of the first planes transporting the missiles. The arrangement was for Edwell to be alerted and, in turn, she would call a few people who would each call a few more until all those who needed to be alerted had been contacted. As Edwell lived below the flight path, she was instructed on how to recognise a Lockheed C-5 Galaxy, which it was believed would be used to transport the missiles. As a result, soon after the first plane arrived, large numbers of camp supporters arrived at Greenham Common to protest, being met with a large contingent of police and police helicopters with floodlights.

In the event of war, the cruise missiles were intended to be moved around the countryside so as not to be targets for incoming Soviet missiles. Test convoys with the cruise missiles were taken out of the base on many occasions, usually in the direction of Salisbury Plain. The peace camp established "Cruise Watch", which was designed to identify the route and locations of the convoys. Here, also, the telephone tree method was used, with Edwell and others, such as Evelyn Parker, monitoring the gates of the base and sending messages to people throughout the area when convoys left the base or when they expected that they would leave. A reliable clue of an impending departure was the presence of many police vans around the base. Edwell would send her children out on their bikes just before they went to bed, to see whether there were any vans waiting. Throughout the night she would wait for phone calls to tell her of action taken to block the convoys and arrests made and then inform the newspapers. Other actions she undertook included throwing paint at passing convoys, as well as bad duck eggs obtained from a local wildlife centre, which left a nasty smell. This action was taken in response to government statements saying that there had been no protests.

== Archive ==
Edwell kept a large number of records entrusted to her, which are now held at the Royal Berkshire Archives. The archive, in her name, includes records relating to her activities at the peace camp but also letters, newsletters, and posters from across the world that were sent to Greenham Common by supporters, reflecting the international impact of the camp. These include documents from the anti-nuclear campaigns in the Pacific; from Nicaragua where there were demands for the removal of American troops and nuclear weapons from South America; and from similar camps in Italy, France, Belgium, and Denmark.
