= Joan Wakelin =

British photographer (1928-2003)

- Joan Wakelin in face paint at Greenham
- Born: 21 April 1928; Lancashire, England
- Died: 23 September 2003 (aged 75)
- Known for: Photography of the Greenham Common Women's Peace Camp

Joan Wakelin (21 April 1928 – 23 September 2003) was an English photojournalist who specialised in black and white portraiture. Among her work was extensive coverage of the Greenham Common Women's Peace Camp protests against US nuclear cruise missiles being sited in Britain, as well as photographs of Vietnamese boat people in Hong Kong.

== Early life ==
Wakelin was born in Lancashire on 21 April 1928. At her insistence, she was given a camera when she was nine and began to take photographs. At 17, she went to work in the laboratories of the Shell petroleum company in Cheshire, where she developed skills in photographing industrial topics. Although she also received training in studio lighting, throughout her life her preference was to use available light. She was refused a place on a photography course in 1964 because "the organiser did not think a married mother of two should take one of the limited places".

== Career ==
In 1976 Wakelin was asked by the Observer newspaper to visit Sri Lanka. In 1980, she participated in an exhibition titled Women’s Images of Men at the Institute of Contemporary Arts in London. Her photograph Man and Girl was singled out by one review as a "remarkable image which forces stark recognition of an instance of absolute male dominance". Another photograph, showing a glimpse of male genitalia led to many protests, exhibiting the double standards around male and female nudity.

She then achieved recognition through her photographs of the Greenham Common protests near Newbury, Berkshire, which began in September 1981. She lived in Berkshire and was able to make frequent visits to the camp, chronicling the women protesters, their way of life, and their campaigning tactics. She did not become a member of the camp, and did not necessarily agree with the protest, but for a time was accepted by the protestors. She has written that she oscillated between observer and participant. She wrote that "to get my pictures I had my face painted, and sat on the break-in ladders", but eventually the women turned against her. She noted that "although I was not 'one of them', and found their way of life unacceptable, I had formed a genuine affection and somehow an admiration for their courage and for their determination". Her lack of total commitment to the Greenham women's cause differentitates her photographs from images by women who were both photographers and activists.

As a guest of the New Zealand government in the 1980s and early 1990s, she lectured on the photography of that country's people and landscapes. She had a particular empathy with the Māori communities. She also documented Aboriginal Australians. In 1980 she photographed Cambodian and Laotian refugees in Thailand. In 1989, she covered Vietnamese boat people in detention centres in Hong Kong and Singapore, on assignment for NGOs such as Save the Children, winning awards for this work. She has described experiencing sexual harassment whilst on assignment.

At home in Berkshire, Wakelin continued to develop ties with the local photographic community. At the end of the seventies, she was asked to tour an exhibition of contemporary British photography. She collected prints from five eminent photographers in the UK for this exhibition and took the show to Australia, including Tasmania, and New Zealand, to much acclaim. Several exhibitors from this tour began meeting occasionally and founded Arena: Photographers from the South in 1986. She continued to be actively involved with the group until ill health forced her to give up her role.

In 1991, she moved to Bath, Somerset and continued to print her work for exhibitions and to urge others to exhibit their pictures. In 1996 she was commissioned to photograph the work of the Bristol Haematology and Oncology Centre. She was made an honorary fellow of the Royal Photographic Society (RPS) in 1992. In 2000 she was awarded the society's Fenton Medal, given to members or non-members who have made an outstanding contribution to the work of the RRPS. She also became a fellow of the British Institute of Professional Photography.

== Publications ==
Her book, A Different Drum (2000), is an anthology of her work with notes on her life. It reflects her emphasis on giving voice to the disadvantaged or vulnerable and on her encouragement to many others to take photographs.

== Death ==
Wakelin died on 23 September 2003. She had two daughters. Much of her work is now with the RPS archive at the National Science and Media Museum in Bradford, consisting of 43 boxes of photographic prints and 24 boxes of archival material. A Joan Wakelin Bursary for budding photographers was set up in 2005, jointly administered by the Guardian and the Royal Photographic Society. It offers photographers the chance to see their work in the Guardian.
