= Rosy Bremer =

British anti-nuclear weapon campaigner (1971–2025)

Emily Rosy Bremer
- Born: 10 June 1971; Portsmouth, England
- Died: 27 March 2025 (aged 53); Portsmouth, England
- Occupations: Librarian; journalist
- Known for: Greenham Common Women's Peace Camp

Emily Rosy Bremer (10 June 1971 – 27 March 2025) was an English anti-war activist who spent four years at the Greenham Common Women's Peace Camp in opposition to American cruise missiles with nuclear warheads being based in Britain. She later worked to assist immigrants, protested against the Iraq War and became a campaigner for the rights of those suffering disabilities. Prior to her death she was a reporter for the Portsmouth Star and Crescent news website.

== Early life ==
Rosy Bremer was born in Portsmouth on 10 June 1971. From an early age she suffered significant health problems. From the age of seven she had rheumatoid arthritis and in her twenties an auto-immune blood disorder. Later she experienced severe disability from motor neurone disease. She studied A-levels at Havant College and then obtained a degree in French at the University of Liverpool, regularly visiting Greenham while she was studying. She followed this with a year working in France, living at Shakespeare and Company bookshop in Paris.

== Activism ==
Bremer's activism was strongly shaped by her second visit with a friend to Greenham Common Women's Peace Camp in the summer of 1989 to celebrate Hiroshima Day, the anniversary of the first atomic bomb dropped on Japan. They arrived shortly after one of the protestors, Helen Thomas, had been killed when she was struck by a police vehicle while waiting to cross the road outside the camp. Bremer was strongly affected by what she saw as a cover-up, believing that the media, police, and courts were exploiting grief, obstructing justice, and providing misinformation.

In 1993, Bremer decided to live full-time on Greenham Common. She stayed there for four years carrying out non-violent direct action at Greenham, at the Atomic Weapons Establishment (AWE) Aldermaston, at AWE Burghfield where Trident warheads were made, and at other nuclear weapon facilities. She was often arrested, representing herself in court cases. On one occasion at the High Court, she challenged the production of nuclear weapons under the Genocide Act. She received 13 prison sentences, for actions at Greenham and elsewhere, mainly because she refused to pay fines. In a 2019 interview, she explained how Greenham had given her an "absolutely unshakeable belief that when people get together to take on injustice they can fight and win".

Bremer was a spokesperson for the other camp members when it was announced on 6 September 1999, exactly 18 years after the camp had been set up, that it would be closing down. After leaving Greenham in 1999, Bremer moved back to Portsmouth. She worked for several years at BID (Bail for Immigration Detainees), which prepared bail applications to release immigrants from detention. She was active with the nonprofit organization Friends Without a Border, with peace groups protesting against the Iraq War and with anti-racist organisations. After leaving BID she worked at the Portsmouth Central Library and then at the University of Portsmouth library.

Later in life, terminally ill, Bremer used a wheelchair for mobility, meanwhile her activism continued. In February 2024 she spraypainted "♥ Gaza ♥ Rafah ♥ peace" on the walls of the Portsmouth Naval Base. She escaped arrest because she was in a wheelchair. Ordered to write an apology to the naval base commander, she instead sent him an anti-war poem. She told the Portsmouth News, "I understand a bit about coming to terms with my own death. No human being can come to terms with the deaths of 12,000 babies killed".

As a motor neurone disease sufferer, Bremer endured many battles to obtain essential living equipment and care, and to challenge discriminatory treatment. With good contacts in the media, she was able to obtain publicity for her problems. In May 2024, she was featured in an article in The Guardian complaining that it had taken over one year for a National Health Service wheelchair to be delivered. This highlighted the difficulties faced by the company producing them. In January 2025 she was again in an article in The Guardian about her inability to obtain an overnight carer, which meant that she was unable to use her ventilator.

== Death ==
Bremer died of motor neurone disease in Portsmouth, on 27 March 2025, at the age of 53. She had one daughter. An obituary was broadcast on BBC Radio 4's Last Word program.
