= Sue Lent =

British Labour Party councillor and anti-nuclear activist (born 1952)

- Born: 1952 (age 73–74); Manchester, England
- Education: Cardiff University
- Occupation: Local politician
- Known for: Deputy leader of Cardiff council; one of the first marchers who set up the Greenham Common Women's Peace Camp
- Political party: Welsh Labour

Sue Lent (born 1952) is a British peace campaigner who was one of the 36 women who took part in the march from Cardiff, Wales to RAF Greenham Common near Newbury, Berkshire in England in August and September 1981, which led to the formation of the Greenham Common Women's Peace Camp. A social worker, she has served as a county councillor in Wales and as deputy leader of Cardiff council. She is a member of the Welsh Labour Party.

== Early life and education ==
Lent was born in Manchester in 1952 and educated at Ashton-under-Lyne Grammar School. She graduated from Cardiff University in 1973, having studied English and philosophy, and obtained a social work diploma there in 1978. She worked as a social worker for Monmouthshire County Council.

== Activism ==
Lent became interested in Labour Party politics whilst at university and joined the party in the mid-1970s. She was active in the Anti-Apartheid Movement and other anti-racist activities, and joined Cor Cochion Caerdydd, a campaigning socialist choir, in 1989. She was involved with the Troops Out Movement, which aimed to get British troops out of Northern Ireland. Formerly involved with the Campaign for Nuclear Disarmament, she remains actively opposed to all nuclear weapons and is chair of the Cardiff branch of the Stop the War Coalition.

== Greenham Common ==
Lent was one of the original 36 women (and 4 men) who walked from Cardiff to Greenham Common in 1981. She was with her one-year-old son Christopher, who was in a push chair. Wearing flip-flops she had just planned to do the first stage of the march, from Cardiff to Newport, Wales together with her husband, but by the end of the day she had decided to do the whole 120-mile march. Concerned that this was not ideal when accompanied by a child, she consulted one of the organisers, Ann Pettitt, who reassured her. She then took the bus back to Cardiff and packed, and her husband took her and her son back to Newport the following morning. After the arrival at Greenham she stayed for three days, finding it difficult to break away from the women she had just spent ten days with, before returning to Cardiff. After that, her role was mainly to act as an occasional delivery driver to the camp, although she took part in "Embrace the Base" in December 1982 when an estimated 35,000 women and children formed a human chain around RAF Greenham Common, and in other similar events.

In 2021 she took part in part of the 40th anniversary march, organised by Scary Little Girls, that followed the same route from Cardiff to Greenham. She said that she was paying tribute to the original organisers who, in the era before social media and mobile phones, had turned up in Cardiff not knowing how many women would be there. She told The Guardian that "I'm proud that I went. I think what Greenham teaches us is that you should never doubt that a small number of people can make a difference. Even if you don't think you can do anything, you should do it anyway.”

== Political activities ==
Lent was elected to Cardiff council in 1995, serving until 2004. She has said that she is not sure that she would have had the confidence to stand for the council without her Greenham experience. She was elected again for five-year terms in 2012, 2017 and 2022. She became deputy leader of the council in 2014. Lent is a local authority governor for two primary schools in Cardiff and also sits on council's Community & Adult Services Scrutiny Committee, giving guidance on care for children. She represents Cardiff on the UK and Ireland chapter of Mayors for Peace and on "Nuclear Free Local Authorities". She has been a spokesperson for "Labour Women's Declaration".
