= Chris Drake (peace activist) =

British anti-nuclear activist

Chris (Christine) Drake is an English protestor against nuclear weapons who was a member of the Greenham Common Women's Peace Camp. She has subsequently campaigned against legislation restricting the right to freedom of speech and in support of Palestine and lesbian rights.

== Activism ==
Drake left her Dewsbury, West Yorkshire home to live at the Greenham Common camp in Newbury, Berkshire in England in 1982. She was married with three children and saw her movement to the camp as a way of protecting her children and ensuring that they had a future. She had been inspired by a showing in Dewsbury of The War Game, a film written, directed and produced by Peter Watkins for the BBC that depicted the aftermath of nuclear war. It was not broadcast on television until 1985 but received screenings at film festivals and elsewhere. After watching the film, she had organised a meeting to discuss it, which attracted many participants. This led to her setting up a Campaign for Nuclear Disarmament (CND) group in Dewsbury. She then booked a minivan and organised a trip to Greenham to participate in the "Embrace the Base" activity in December 1982, when an estimated 30,000 women linked hands around the perimeter fence. The next day she was blocking the road in an attempt to close the base, when she was picked up by a policeman and thrown against the curb, resulting in her being in considerable pain.

Six months later, with her sister living in her home to look after her children, Drake returned to Greenham Common. During her time there she came out as a lesbian, noting that it was an environment where you could be yourself and not what others' expectations of you were. The tabloid media and others used derogatory terms such as "lesbians and communists" against the camp women. After being arrested on one occasion, police took Drake to a room on the base where they assaulted her with blows, aerosol spray, and hot coffee.

There were several different camps around the base, named after the colours of the rainbow. Drake helped to set up the green and orange camps but eventually ended up living at the blue camp for many years, which she has described as the "working class camp". She left the camp the day after the last missile left the RAF Greenham Common base in 1991, although the camp remained until 2000. During her time there, she had been forced to sign over custody of her children to her ex-husband because there was the possibility that she would go to prison for up to two years.

At the time when talks about nuclear weapons were happening in Geneva about 20 women from Greenham Common went there. Drake and three others managed to break into the Russian Embassy to speak to the negotiators.

== After Greenham ==
Since leaving Greenham Common, Drake has campaigned against legislation that would restrict the right of British people to freedom of speech and freedom of assembly to demonstrate political views. She has spoken at universities and elsewhere on feminism and other matters. She has been active in efforts to support Palestine, holding protests in the town of Hebden Bridge in West Yorkshire, and in promoting lesbian rights. She was also part of the cast of the 2021 film, Mothers of the Revolution, about the Greenham Common protest, which was narrated by the former actress and politician, Glenda Jackson.
