= Silver Moon (peace activist) =

Australian peace activist, feminist and musician

- Born: Valerie Smith; 9 July 1952 (age 74); Adelaide, Australia
- Education: University of Adelaide
- Occupations: Peace activist; feminist, musician

Silver Moon (born 1952 as Valerie Smith) is an Australian peace activist, feminist, musician, and teacher who describes herself as an "anarchist feminist lesbian activist".

== Early life and education ==
Silver Moon was born on 9 July 1952 as Valerie Smith, at the Northern Community Hospital in Prospect in the northern suburbs of Adelaide, South Australia. She was the youngest of six children, having four brothers and one sister. Her mother, Audrey Mau, was a pianist and her father was a mechanic at South Australian Railways. She grew up in Blair Athol, also in the northern suburbs of Adelaide. She attended Blair Athol Primary School and Enfield High School. She was a Sunday school teacher until the age of 15, which made her aware of the inequality of male and female roles in her church.

At home Moon's family had no books and, an avid reader, she was dependent on the local library. She was a rebel at high school, writing for the school newspaper and, according to her, was disliked by the teachers. She took part in protests against the Vietnam War and in an anti-apartheid demonstration at Norwood Oval in Adelaide against the visiting South Africa national rugby union team. With Australia supporting the U.S. in Vietnam, her youngest brother was conscripted to fight there.

With her mother's musical influence, Moon played the guitar and percussion instruments and also wrote songs. She left home at 17 and moved into communal houses and squats. Soon after, she started to attend women's liberation meetings. She worked at the Adelaide Women's Liberation Centre, the Rape Crisis Centre, and the Women's Studies Resource Centre. Moon studied politics and philosophy at the University of Adelaide. She married in 1974 but divorced four years later, having not realised that she was a lesbian at the time she married. At 28, she came out as a lesbian at a conference on "Women, Patriarchy and the Future", held in Melbourne. She had an abortion after being raped by a former boyfriend.

== Peace activism in the United Kingdom ==
Moon worked as a social worker at Queen Victoria Hospital in Adelaide; at the Women's Health Centre at Hindmarsh and at the Adelaide Rape Crisis Centre. Then her girlfriend bought her a ticket to fly to London for a short holiday. In August 1983, she visited the Greenham Common Women's Peace Camp, which was protesting about the planned installation of U.S. nuclear-armed cruise missiles at the RAF Greenham Common base. Although she had little money she decided to stay, in part because there were at the time relatively few women there and she felt an obligation to boost the numbers. She lived at the Green Gate, which she considered to be the safest of the camps, particularly for women with children. (The protestors separated into several camps at different gates of the base, which were named after the colours of the rainbow). On occasions the missiles were transported out of the base as a trial for what was planned to happen should there be a nuclear war. The women at Greenham and others in south of England formed Cruise Watch to monitor the missiles' movements and block the progress of their convoys on the roads. Those at Green Gate played an important role as they were closest to the missile silos and were able to alert others when they thought the missiles were likely to be moved.

She experienced the frequent attempts by bailiffs to evict the women, and was often arrested for blocking access to or egress from the camp, or for cutting the fence and entering the base, in at least one case with women roller skating down the runway. She conducted her own defence in court. Moon also wrote and performed songs, some of which can be found on the Danish Peace Academy web site. As did many of the women at Greenham, she visited a peace camp in Denmark and the Faslane Peace Camp at the Faslane nuclear submarine base in Scotland.

Moon was imprisoned three times. Her first prison sentence was at Holloway women's prison in London, where she was held for a week. She refused to eat until she was given vegan food. She has said that she went in as anti-nuclear activist and came out as prison reformer. In Risley prison in Cheshire she shared a room with 22 women.

Moon returned to Australia in 1986 to join the women's peace camp in Canberra, before returning to England. She was in very poor health, which she attributed to nuclear contamination, although the British government has denied that there were any leakages at Greenham. In 1986, the International Year of Peace, she joined a Women's Peace Bus from Britain to the Soviet Union. She then spent two years living near Dumfries in Scotland before returning to Australia. She briefly returned to Greenham Common for the tenth anniversary of the protest in 1991.

== Back in Australia ==
Moon was one of the founders, in September 1988, of the Women's Environmental Action Group (WENAG). This organised protests against BHP's Olympic Dam copper and uranium mine, 550km north of Adelaide and action against the first Gulf War. In addition, WENAG organised circus classes for women, and counselling and other activities for lesbians. In April 1992 she was one of the organisers of a "Lesbian Spirit Camp" at Aldinga, South Australia with women from all over Australia participating in arts, music, magic, plants, and quizzes. WENAG also organised a National Lesbian Conference in Sydney, which included a concert at the Sydney Opera House with performances by Robyn Archer, and a lesbian choir.

In 1991 Moon became editor of the Women's Liberation newsletter, MeJane, which had started in 1971. She was also involved with the national lesbian newsletter Lesbian Network. She worked for Radio Adelaide, a community radio station started at Adelaide University, where she was involved with a women's show called No Frills, handling technical issues as well as doing interviews and reports. This led her to study for a diploma in audio engineering, where she was the only woman in a class of 30. She then obtained a job at the Elder Conservatorium of Music in Adelaide, working in the recording studios. Moon also lectured at TAFE South Australia, which provides technical and vocational education and at the Workers' Educational Association (WEA). She taught "women managing without men", covering home maintenance, such as plumbing, electricity, and car maintenance. She also offered courses in feminism and feminist thought. As a musician she has performed with the Women's Drumming Group and the all-woman group, the Bangshees, and she writes and performs her own music. Moon has also taught drumming and percussion, both to professional performers and for people with mental health problems. She was an active member of Lesbian over forty (Lofty), Lesbian Line (counselling phone service for lesbians) and the Rural Lesbian Separatist Group. She later joined the State Library of South Australia, working to preserve the State's audio history. In the 2020s she was a member of The Soup Collective, an art group for older lesbians, contributing three sound works to an exhibition on religion that the collective organised in Hobart in 2022. She has lived on a farm with her partner since 1988.
