= Peggy Walford =

British anti-nuclear weapon campaigner (died 2018)

- Walford armed with a wirecutter
- Born: Peggy Mitchell; 1920 or 1921; Brechin, Angus, Scotland
- Died: 2018 (aged 97)
- Known for: Long-serving member of the Greenham Common Women's Peace Camp
- Spouse: Jack Walford

Peggy Walford (died 2018) was a communist for more than 80 years and was one of the last four women to leave the anti-nuclear weapons protest site known as the Greenham Common Women's Peace Camp in 2000.

== Early life ==
Walford was born in Brechin in Angus, Scotland. She was the eighth of nine children of Elizabeth (née Duncan) and Joseph Mitchell. Her father had worked as a tailor but was unable to return to work after being gassed during World War I. Walford went to Bank Street school in Brechin before leaving to work at the local weavers. Almost all her earnings went to her mother. In the 1930s she went to London, where she was a domestic servant at the home of the editor of Punch. After returning to Brechin, she joined the Young Communist League after hearing a speech by the general secretary of the Communist Party of Great Britain, Harry Pollitt. She remained with the party for the rest of her life.

In 1941, during World War II, she met Jack Walford, a machinist at a "shadow" aircraft factory in Brechin. Both committed trade unionists, they married in 1942. Her husband was conscripted in 1943 and stayed in the forces until 1950. In 1953, they moved to Coventry.

== Activism ==
Like many communists in the UK they were keen to visit the Soviet Union. In 1969 they drove with their children in a small car to Kiev, now the capital of Ukraine but then in the Soviet Union. The following year they visited Moscow. Walford joined the Greenham peace camp in 1983. Apart from during periods when she suffered from bad arthritis and when her husband died in 1989, she remained at the Yellow Gate camp until 2000 when the last four women left the site. She was arrested on several occasions, the last being when she was 78 in 1998, when she and Sarah Hipperson were, after the first jury disagreed, eventually sentenced to prison on the charge of criminal damage to the fence at the Atomic Weapons Establishment at Burghfield. She spent several periods in Holloway prison.

In 1986 Walford had returned to Moscow. There she was arrested and deported for displaying an anti-nuclear banner in Gorky Park. In 1990 she travelled to Libya for a peace conference.

== Death ==
Walford died in 2018 at the age of 97. She had three sons, two of whom predeceased her, and one daughter.
