= Rebecca Johnson (activist) =

British peace activist

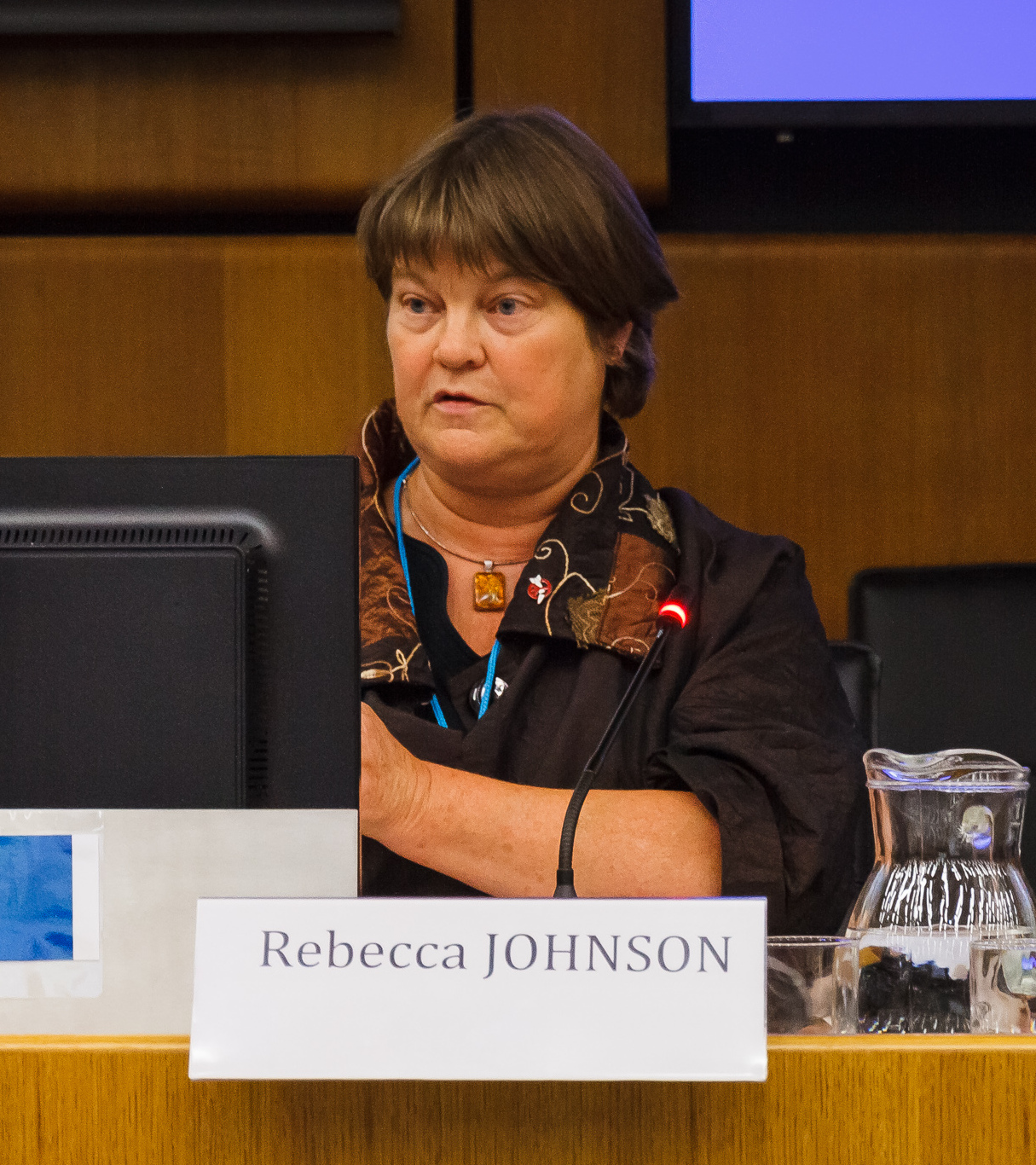
- Rebecca Johnson in September 2014
- Education: University of Bristol; SOAS University of London; London School of Economics
- Occupations: Peace Activist, Expert on Nuclear disarmament
- Organisation(s): Acronym Institute for Disarmament Diplomacy; International Campaign to Abolish Nuclear Weapons
- Political party: Green Party
- Partner: Helen

Rebecca Johnson is a British peace activist and expert on nuclear disarmament. She is the director and founder of Acronym Institute for Disarmament Diplomacy as well as a co-founding strategist and organiser of the International Campaign to Abolish Nuclear Weapons.

== Education ==
Johnson holds a B.Sc. in philosophy and politics from University of Bristol and a Master of Arts in international relations of the Far East from the School of Oriental and African Studies (SOAS). Johnson completed a PhD in international relations and treaty negotiations at the London School of Economics in 2004. Her thesis was titled "The 1996 Comprehensive Test Ban Treaty: a study in post Cold War multilateral arms control negotiations".

== Activism ==
Johnson started her career as an activist in 1982. She lived at the Greenham Common Women's Peace Camp for five years (1982-1987). There she protested against the decision of the British government to keep cruise missiles at RAF Greenham Common. During that time, she founded the Aldermaston Women’s Peace Camp(aign). In the 1980s, she served on the CND’s Council as a vice-chair. She is now a vice-president of CND.

Johnson organised Greenpeace’s test ban campaign until 1992. She founded the Acronym Institute for Disarmament Diplomacy in the early 1990s. She is Director of that Institute.

Johnson worked as Vice Chair of the Board of the Bulletin of the Atomic Scientists from 2001 until 2007. She was Senior Advisor for the International Weapons of Mass Destruction Commission (Blix Commission, 2004-2006). Johnson participated in the Faslane 365 campaign in Scotland during 2006-07 and served on the Scottish Government’s Working Group on Nuclear Weapons.

In the 2015 general election she stood as the Green Party candidate for the Hampstead and Kilburn constituency.

Johnson has become involved with Extinction Rebellion’s campaign. This campaign endeavours to persuade governments to treat climate destruction as a global emergency. She is a co-founding strategist and organiser of the International Campaign to Abolish Nuclear Weapons. (ICAN) The campaign received the 2017 Nobel Peace Prize for "its work to draw attention to the catastrophic humanitarian consequences of any use of nuclear weapons and for its ground-breaking efforts to achieve a treaty-based prohibition of such weapons".

Johnson is a member of the International Panel on Fissile Materials (IPFM). She is a part of the women’s advisory group for the International Action Network on Small Arms (IANSA). She was also one of the founders of Women in Black London.

== Personal life ==
Johnson moved from Shropshire to the US with her parents as a baby. She lived in an insular Hutterite community in North Dakota and Pennsylvania for the first seven years of her life. However, Johnson's family returned to the UK and settled in Sussex after the struggle within the community.

Johnson lives in Hackney with her partner Helen.

== Books ==
Johnson has written Unfinished Business, an essential handbook on the 1996 Comprehensive Nuclear Test Ban Treaty (CTBT) negotiations. Dr. Johnson is an author of the analyses on the Non-Proliferation Treaty (NPT) Review Process, and the humanitarian strategies and negotiations of the 2017 Treaty on the Prohibition of Nuclear Weapons.
