= Karmen Cutler =

British anti-nuclear weapon campaigner

- Born: Karmen Cutler; Manchester, England
- Known for: One of the founders of the Greenham Common Women's Peace Camp; visit to Moscow in 1983 to promote nuclear disarmament

Karmen Cutler-Thomas was one of the original four women who formed Women for Life on Earth (WFLOE), and organised a march in 1981 from Cardiff in Wales to RAF Greenham Common in England to protest against the proposed storage of US nuclear cruise missiles in Britain. This led to the establishment of the Greenham Common Women's Peace Camp, which was to continue until 2000. In May 1983, she and two other women visited Moscow, where they met with Oleg Kharkhadin, the vice-president of the Soviet Peace Committee, in controversial circumstances.

== Early life and education ==
Cutler was born in Manchester, England and later moved to the North Riding of Yorkshire. Around the age of 10, she moved to Hertfordshire, where she was educated at a convent, followed by a girls' grammar school. She then studied at the London College of Furniture, while living in a squat. She first briefly met Ann Pettitt, one of the other organisers of the march, at a squat in London. Cutler moved to Wales in 1977 and met Pettitt again when they shared the same midwife.

== Organisation of the peace march ==
Pettitt, Cutler, Lynne Whittemore and Liney Seward decided to set up WFLOE due to a growing concern in regard to nuclear weaponry and nuclear waste. They met in Cutler's house because she was the only one of the four who did not drive. They planned the route of the march to Greenham Common, near Newbury, Berkshire, and with the help of the Campaign for Nuclear Disarmament organised places where the marchers could stay overnight and made arrangements to be fed. The march began on 27 August 1981, with 36 women, four men and some children and lasted for ten days. On arrival, Cutler read out their demands, asking for a public debate about the cruise missiles, although there was only a solitary MoD policeman there, who at first mistook them for the cleaners. The women chained themselves to the perimeter fence, using padlocks they had purchased en route.

Originally there were no plans to remain at Greenham but after the US commander aggressively told Helen John that she could stay there as long as she liked as far as he was concerned, they decided to take him up on the offer and the camp slowly began to be established. It was also realised that the march alone was not going to provoke a national debate about the missiles. Over the years, splits arose between the women because of different social, tactical and political approaches and several separate camps around the base were established. One of the disputes involved women who wanted to bring more of a feminist focus to the protest, arguing that militarism could only be solved by an overthrowing male-dominated power systems. Many of the earliest Greenham participants objected to this approach. Cutler and Pettitt argued that this was an unnecessary distraction from the urgent threat of nuclear war and that it excluded men as allies to the cause. Cutler also felt that Greenham had attracted women who had a grudge about a wide range of issues and that a lot of the bad press the camp received was deserved.

== Visits to Moscow ==
Although the Greenham camp had been making international contacts and receiving visitors and residents from many countries, the focus had been on connections with other Western nations. In 1983 "Women for Life on Earth" decided to broaden the approach by establishing relations with the Soviet Union. According to Cutler this was motivated by aggressive onlookers at the camp, who sometimes shouted "go and tell it to the Russians". WFLOE hoped to use the visit to build connections with the "Group to Establish Trust Between the USSR and USA" (GTET), which had been started in early 1982. GTET hoped to pressurise the American and Soviet Union governments to take steps towards nuclear disarmament. Two prominent members were Olga Medvedkov and her husband Yuri, who had both been sacked from their university jobs for their activism.

Wanting to avoid a state-manipulated visit, Cutler and Pettitt developed a plan for approximately 30 women from across the UK to be divided into groups of two or three and visit different parts of the USSR to exchange ideas with Soviet women. This required a preparatory visit to obtain permission from state officials. At the same time they hoped to initiate contacts with independent peace groups, such as GTET. To facilitate this they involved Jean McCollister, a student of Russian studies and a linguist, who also had contacts with GTET. On arrival in Moscow, Cutler, Pettitt and McCollister attended a picnic for peace with GTET. At this event they were asked to take Medvedkov with them on their visit to the Soviet Peace Committee the following day.

The meeting with the Soviet Peace Committee was to be televised. The four women arrived late as their taxi broke down and to avoid further delays security formalities were ignored, with nobody querying who Medvedkov was. When she started her introduction the cameramen and photographers were immediately ushered out of the meeting room and when she moved on to discuss GTET, she was interrupted by the vice-president, Oleg Kharkhardin, who then rebuked Cutler and Pettitt for taking Medvedkov to the meeting. Medvekov then voluntarily left the meeting and the discussions continued for about three hours. Later, the Medvekovs were permitted to emigrate to the US. Visas were eventually granted to around 30 British peace protestors to travel in small groups around the USSR at the end of 1983 and in 1984. However, Pettitt was denied a visa and Cutler's activities were restricted to Moscow and Leningrad.
