= Zohl de Ishtar =

Irish-Australian sociologist

Zohl de Ishtar (born 1953) is an Irish-Australian sociologist, anti-nuclear activist and feminist. Founder of Women Working for a Nuclear Free and Independent Pacific and the Kapululangu Women's Law and Culture Centre, she has campaigned for peace throughout her career. In 2005 she was nominated for the Nobel Peace Prize.

== Biography ==
De Ishtar was born in Adelaide in 1953. She was awarded an MA by Macquarie University, and an MPhil by the University of Sydney. In 1982 she travelled to the United Kingdom to join the Greenham Common Women's Peace Camp, where she spent much of her time at Green Gate. Whilst there she started the Women Working for a Nuclear Free and Independent Pacific (WWNFIP) movement in the UK. She stated that the movement was born as the result of a party held at the protest camp to "celebrate the strength of our Indigenous Pacific sisters". The organisation campaigned to raise awareness amongst British peace activists about the issues facing colonized Pacific countries.

In 1995 she travelled with the flotilla of ships who travelled to Moruroa to protest against French nuclear testing there and was the only Australian to make the full 483 kilometre journey.

From 1999 to 2001 she was the founder and director of the short-lived Kapululangu Women's Law and Culture Centre in Wirrimanu, where she lived and worked alongside Aboriginal women. In 2003 she was awarded a PhD from Deakin University, based on her research in Wirrimanu. In 2005 she was nominated for the Nobel Prize Peace, a nomination that recognised her work in anti-nuclear education with indigenous peoples.

== Reception ==
De Ishtar's book Holding Yawulyu: White Culture and Black Women’s Law is based on her experience of living with the Kapululangu community, and was described by Amanda Kearney, as a work which attempted to "demystify life in Aboriginal communities and illuminate some of the points of engagement between Indigenous and non-Indigenous Australians". However Kearney felt that the book still contributed to the exoticisation of "Indigenous people and their ways of living" and that it did not centre Kapululangu voices and perspectives enough. Myrna Tonkinson suggested that it was most suitable for a general audience that had little prior knowledge of indigenous issues.

== Personal life ==
De Ishtar lives in Brisbane, Queensland, Australia.

In 2019 De Ishtar was acquitted of committing sexual assault by Kununurra Magistrates Court.

== Awards and recognition ==
- Deakin University: Isi Leibler Prize (2003)
- Nobel Peace Prize nominee (2005)

== Selected works ==
=== Books ===
- Daughters of the Pacific (1994, Spinifex Press)
- Holding Yawulyu: White Culture and Black Women's Law (2005, Spinifex Press)

=== Articles ===
- Dé Ishtar, Zohl. "Striving for a common language: A white feminist parallel to Indigenous ways of knowing and researching." Women's Studies International Forum. Vol. 28. No. 5. Pergamon, 2005.
- De Ishtar, Zohl. "Living on the ground research: steps towards white women researching in collaboration with Indigenous people." Hecate 30.1 (2004): 72–82.
- De Ishtar, Zohl. "Poisoned Lives, Contaminated Lands: Marshall Islanders Are Paying a High Price for the United States Nuclear Arsenal." Seattle J. Soc. Just. 2 (2003): 287.
- De Ishtar, Zohl. "‘War, Violence, Terror, Genocide’-The Pacific Experience." Sociological Research Online 4.2 (1999): 44–49.
