= Susan Kleckner =

American feminist activist

- Born: July 5, 1941; Great Neck, Long Island, New York
- Died: July 7, 2010 (aged 69)
- Occupations: filmmaker, photographer, Performance Artist, writer
- Years active: 1969–2010
- Known for: Feminist activism
- Notable work: Windowpeace

Susan Kleckner was a feminist filmmaker, photographer, performance artist, and writer active from the late 1960s until 2010 and based in New York City.

== Early life ==
Kleckner was born in Great Neck, Long Island, New York on July 5, 1941, as one of four children of Anita and Charles Kleckner. From 1944 to 1947, she was largely bedridden with an unknown and possibly spurious childhood illness; according to the artist’s niece Sonya Milton, “I recall her telling me she really wasn’t ill, and the family was being bilked by a ‘quack’ physician and she had to remain bedridden. When no one was around she would jump up and down on the bed as fast and as long as she could.”

She witnessed her father's death in 1955 and after her mother was hospitalized in 1956 she left home to move in with her older sister Estelle and her family in Glen Cove, Long Island. She supported herself by working in stores and restaurants and finished high school while living with her sister. She began suffering from bipolar disorder in her teenage years. In her early twenties, she took up photography seriously. Despite her limited formal education, she worked as a counselor for people with intellectual disabilities in the mid-1960s at the Center for Rehabilitation, where she used photography as a therapeutic tool.

== Early activism and work ==
From 1966-1967, Kleckner participated in anti-Vietnam War demonstrations. In 1968 she began artistic photographic work, including multiple images and burned and solarized images. Also in 1968, she joined her first feminist consciousness raising group–one that included member Kristin Booth Glen who would later appear in Kleckner's Birth Film. From 1968-1970, she worked on a series of silkscreens, Fracture, and produced many images of subways.

In 1969, she sought funding for Women Artists in Revolution (WAR) from the New York State Council on the Arts, working with WAR and Feminists in the Arts and eventually receiving $5,000 from the council. She participated in Art Workers’ Coalition and was involved in a protest at MoMA against the Vietnam War and the People’s Flag Show at Judson Memorial Church, where she used a portable video recorder for the first time. She became the first woman to teach photography at the Pratt Institute in 1969, and helped found the Women's Interart Center in 1970.

She directed several films during this period. In 1970, she co-directed the 16 mm film Three Lives, often considered the first documentary about women produced by an all-woman crew, narrating three women's stories of coming out. Included in this film was footage of the Christopher Street Gay Liberation March, an early event in the LGBT rights movement of which very little known footage exists.

In 1971 she spent time at Robert Wilson’s Byrd Hoffman School of Byrds, where she befriended Pierre Ruiz, who later appeared in Pierre Film.

Her next documentary, in 1972, was Another Look at the Miami Convention: A Work In Progress, centered on the presidential candidacy of Shirley Chisholm, the first woman and African American to seek a presidential nomination. It featured the voices of feminists Betty Friedan, Gloria Steinem and Bella Abzug. During this time, she continued to teach photography, at worked at both New York University and City College of New York.

Birth Film, a short documentary self-directed by Kleckner, premiered at the Whitney Museum in 1973. The film depicted a woman, Kirstin Booth Glen, giving birth to her son at home, and was a statement on reproductive rights. Reviewers described feeling sick due to Birth Film's graphic nature, and after the release of Birth Film, Kleckner directed the plastic speculum event for radio station WBAI, which lead to her hospitalization for mental health issues and shortly thereafter a suicide attempt and longer hospitalization, one of several attempts during her lifetime.

In 1974, Kleckner produced Latent Images, drawings of her hospitalization and early-life trauma, which she described as “pictures I had no camera for but have exposed and are latent in my brain.” In the same year she took part in a summer residency at Cummington School of the Arts, Massachusetts.

== Later filmmaking and teaching ==
In 1977, Kleckner worked with Garland Harris and the Video Woman Collective on a documentary about Harris, a homeless woman living in and out of welfare hotels. She participated in “A Lesbian Show,” organized by Harmony Hammond, which includes a screening of Kleckner’s moving-image work.

Kleckner's other films upon her return included Bag Lady (1979), Pierre Film (1980), Amazing Grace (1980), Desert Piece (1983), and Performance for Cameras (1984). In 1980 she participated in Third Wave group exhibition at Hibbs Gallery, New York, which included her gridded window photographs.

She taught at the International Center of Photography from 1981, teaching courses such as "New York at Night", "Visual Diary", and "Roll-a-Day", and taught private studio classes. She led workshops at the Pratt Institute, New York University and the University of Massachusetts Amherst.

In October and November of 1982, Kleckner took a road trip to Port Jervis, New York, over Halloween, where she made Timepeace. In the years following, her works Ancestor Piece, Desert Piece, Performance for Camera, and others were shown at A.I.R Gallery, MoMA PS1, and 112 Green Street, New York.

== Greenham Common and Windowpeace ==
Kleckner visited Greenham Common Women's Peace Camp three separate times from 1984 to 1987 with a group of women from the Seneca Women’s Encampment for a Future of Peace and Justice, and topographed and videotaped the situation, and later edited her footage from Greenham Common into The Greenham Tapes. Some of the photos displayed the anarchist ideology of the peace camp as well as its collectivist method of decision-making.

Returning to New York City, she initiated Windowpeace, a one-year performance on West Broadway involving 41 women artists which ran from December 1986 to January 1987. The women individually spent 7 days in voluntary incarceration within a 5 by 6.5-foot display area behind bulletproof glass. The space had a loft bed, portable toilet, television monitor, video tape player, telephone, hot plate, and a curtain for occasional privacy. Petitions to promote peace and other activities were organised outside the glass. The project was highly acclaimed and won the Susan B. Anthony Award from the National Organization for Women' New York chapter in 1988, which honored grass-roots activists.

== Berlin Wall performance and mental health ==
A month after Windowpeace closed, in February 1987, Kleckner performed a non-violent art action by climbing the Berlin Wall with a ladder near Checkpoint Charlie. The East German authorities arrested and interrogated her for 20 hours before releasing her with the film she had recorded.

In February 1988, Kleckner suffered from a mental health breakdown due to her bipolar disorder, and spent time in a locked mental health ward. During this time, she photographed her experiences, and was awarded for these photographs in 1997 by the New York Foundation for the Arts Catalogue Project Grant for women photographers over 40 years old.

== Later life and work ==
In 1992, Kleckner received her bachelor of arts from SUNY Empire State College, New York, hosted a solo exhibition at Empire Gallery, and enrolled in the Master of Fine Arts program at Mason Gross School of the Arts, Rutgers University, New Jersey where she studied and worked with Martha Rosler.

Kleckner's work through the 1990s included photographs and video of the Three Mile Island nuclear reactor, an incomplete video project titled Liz and Eileen Birthing Mave, a three-day performance/installation/event In the Shelter of Each Other at the Omega Institute, and Visual Diary. In 1885 she produced a large body of work for RetroSPECTive, her solo exhibition at the Walter K. Gordon Theater, Rutgers University, Camden, New Jersey.

In 1997, she received a Master of Fine Arts degree from Rutgers University.

In 1999, she attended The New Seminary for Interfaith Studies, interested in spirituality. In 2002, she was ordained as Minister of Divinity at the Cathedral of St. John the Divine, and chose the title of Rainbow Reverend.

From 1996 to 2010, Kleckner worked with mental health therapist Ona Lindquist and produced many artworks about their therapeutic relationship, including photographs and computer drawings. During this time she performed Home Office in the window at the New Museum, New York, as part of the series of performances Home Fronts: Between the Public and the Private with Martha Rosler, Susan Kleckner, and Nancy Buchanan, held in conjunction with the exhibition Martha Rosler: Positions in the Life World. She re-performed Home Office as part of the Marxism 2000 conference at UMass Amherst in the same year.

== Cancer diagnosis and death ==
Kleckner was diagnosed with ovarian cancer in 2004, and began to volunteer with SHARE Cancer Support as a result. For the last two years of her life, she used portable oxygen. She continued to teach, make drawings, and take photographs. She acted as an advisor at the One Spirit Interfaith Learning Alliance and worked with the Ovarian Cancer National Alliance. She died from the cancer on July 7, 2010.

Her work was donated to the W. E. B. Du Bois Library in January 2012. In 2014, her work formed the visual core of the exhibition Documents from Greenham Common Women's Peace Camp, which paid tribute to the women who camped at Greenham Common.

== Raw Material: The Art and Life of Susan Kleckner ==
From January 23 to April 5, 2026 the Cantor Fitzgerald Gallery at Haverford College displayed Raw Material: The Art and Life of Susan Kleckner, the first comprehensive survey of the artists' work. Curated by William Kaizen, the exhibition spanned over forty years of creative experimentation and political engagement, offering a long-overdue exploration of Kleckner’s multifaceted career and illuminated her enduring influence on feminist, queer, and activist art practices in the U.S. and beyond. The exhibition comprised approximately 100 works across photography, film, video, installation, and performance.

Funded through a grant from The Pew Center for Arts and Heritage, the exhibition was accompanied by screenings of Kleckner's films Three Lives, Birth Film, Another Look at the Miami Convention, and Desert Piece (Outtakes) in collaboration with Lightbox Film Center. The exhibition was also accompanied by a three-day durational performance program by artist Kiran Jandu entitled Window Peace: An Anarchive that took place March 18-20, 2026 at Public Trust. Jandu's Window Peace: An Anarchive performance revisited and extended Susan Kleckner’s original Window Peace (1986-87). The performance by Jandu honored Linda Montano’s 1987 performance as part of the original Window Peace, through a blindfolded, seven-hour daily practice of chakra-based meditation. Jandu was joined throughout the days by visiting Philadelphia artists including Eva Wu and Angel Shanel Edwards. On Friday March 20, 2026, Linda Montano performed Blindfold Window Peace again for seven hours in the window alongside Jandu. This performance was followed by a community circle event featuring Kiran Jandu, Linda Montano, Sharon Hayes, and Susan Jahoda.

The accompanying Raw Material: The Art and Life of Susan Kleckner publication was authored by William Kaizen with contributions from Linda Cummings, Susan Jahoda, and Siona Wilson. The publication was released in March 2026.

Raw Material: The Art and Life of Susan Kleckner will be on view Feb 9 to May 12, 2027 at The University Museum of Contemporary Art at the University of Massachusetts Amherst.
