= John Kleckner =

American painter

- Born: 1978 (age 47–48); U.S.
- Known for: Painting

John Kleckner (born 1978 in United States) is an American painter, based in Berlin, Germany.

== Life ==
Kleckner's artwork has been shown internationally at galleries and museums such as Galerie Judin in Berlin, the Deste Foundation in Athens, the Yerba Buena Center for the Arts in San Francisco, Centre d'Arts Plastiques Contemporains (CAPC) in Bordeaux, and the Royal Academy in London. His work is featured in several collections including the Saatchi Gallery and The Judith Rothschild Foundation Drawings Collection at The Museum of Modern Art in New York City. Kleckner is currently an instructor of painting and drawing at Bard College Berlin.
