= Helen Thomas (activist) =

Welsh peace activist (1966–1989)

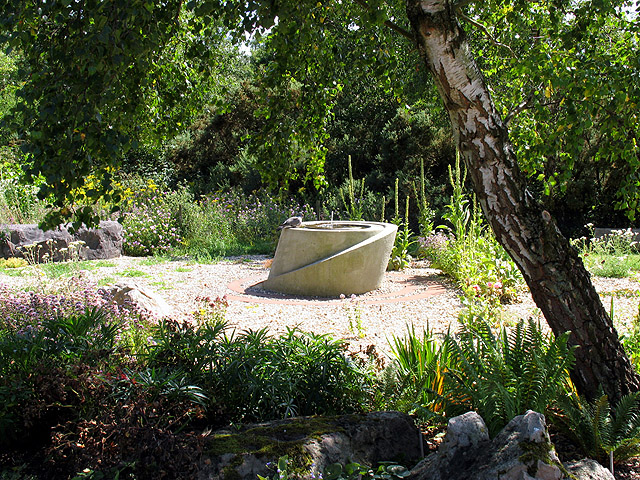
Helen Thomas Memorial Peace Garden

Helen Wyn Thomas (16 August 1966 – 5 August 1989) was a Welsh peace activist from Newcastle Emlyn. Hers was the only death incurred in the course of the Greenham Common Women's Peace Camp campaign.

== Early life and education ==
Helen Wyn Thomas was born at Newcastle Emlyn in Carmarthenshire. Her parents were John and Janet Thomas; they ran an electrical business in the town. She earned a history degree at St David's University College.

== Activism and death ==
After college Helen Thomas lived in Cardiff and worked for Cardiff Women's Aid, before becoming interested in the protest at Greenham Common Women's Peace Camp. She had been at the camp only two months when she died in August 1989, from head injuries sustained when she was struck by a West Midlands Police vehicle, while waiting to cross a road near the airbase's main "Yellow Gate". She was 22 years old. The death was ruled an accident at inquest, though her family and some fellow campaigners disputed that ruling. The family's request to reopen the investigation was denied.

In 2010, a memorial was held at Greenham Common, led by her mother. In 2011, a memorial bench was dedicated to Helen Thomas in her hometown, Newcastle Emlyn. At both memorial events, politician and musician Dafydd Iwan attended, and performed his song "Cân i Helen" in tribute. She was the only individual participant named in the Greenham Common Peace Garden memorial, with standing stones, an eternal flame feature, and a fountain at the centre of an inscribed spiral.

== See also ==
- List of peace activists
