= Women for Life on Earth =

British peace march

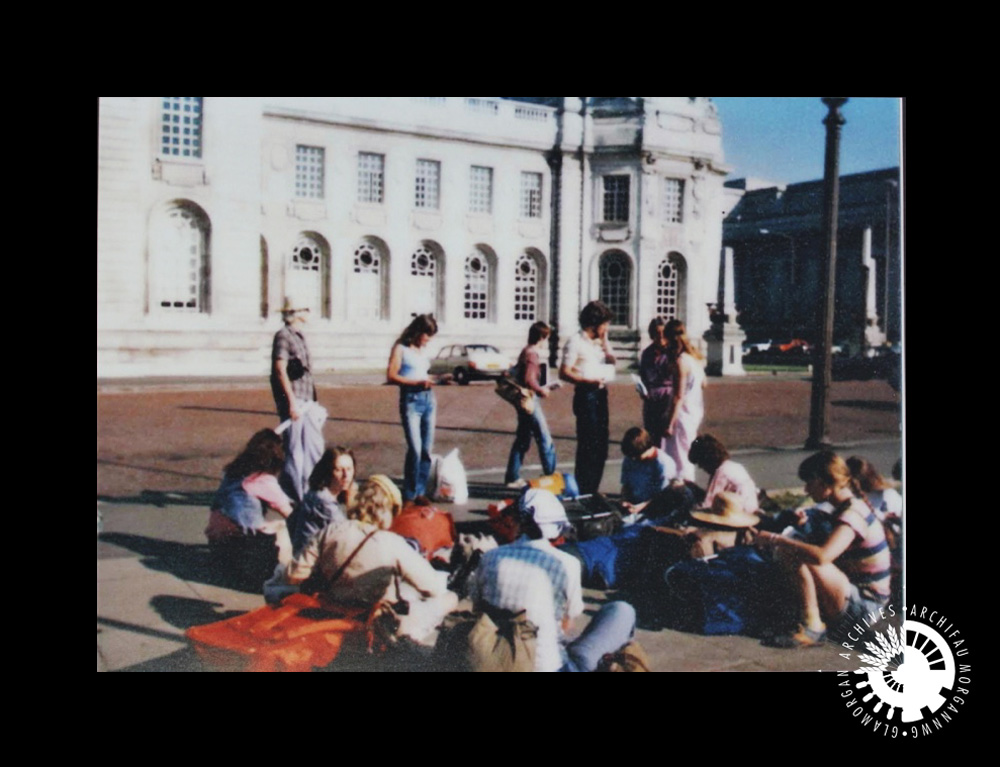
Archived picture of Women for Life on Earth members outside of Cadiff's City Hall, the meeting space for the organization before the march.

Women for Life on Earth was established in Cardiff, Wales, by a group of women who organized a peace march from Cardiff to RAF Greenham Common, near Newbury, Berkshire in England in August and September 1981 to protest against the planned siting of American nuclear-armed cruise missiles in Britain. Although they had originally intended to return home after completing the march, several decided to stay outside the Royal Air Force base, giving rise to the Greenham Common Women's Peace Camp, which lasted from 1981 to 2000. This organization still exists to this day.

== Origins ==
The march from Cardiff to Greenham Common was the idea of Ann Pettitt, who lived on a small farm in West Wales with her husband, and three other women from the same area, Karmen Cutler, Lynne Whittemore, and Liney Seward. In April 1981 they had learnt about a group of Scandinavian women who were planning to march from Copenhagen to Paris to draw attention to their concerns about nuclear weapons. The four women in Wales decided to organise a similar march, but rather than marching to a large city, such as London, they targeted Greenham Common, which had become an American air base and which was due to host 96 missiles by the end of 1983.

To plan the march the four met in Cutler's house because she was the only one who did not drive. The march was to last ten days, and cover over 120 miles. The four organizers envisaged a small group of women and children who would hopefully gather support en route. Planning involved arranging accommodation (often church halls) and food along the route. Assistance was provided by churches, the Quakers, the Campaign for Nuclear Disarmament (CND), and others. Difficulties were sometimes experienced: for example, a feminist group in Bristol refused to offer support because there were going to be men on the march. Local groups organised evening meetings with guest speakers and entertainment, including the folk singers Peggy Seeger and Ewan McColl at Melksham. A banner was embroidered for the march showing the world inside a nuclear disarmament symbol and a sprouting tree, using the Suffragette colours of green, purple and white.

The organizers provided a list of what to take on the march, including sleeping bags, cutlery and plates, two pairs of walking shoes and rain gear. It was decided that women should lead the march but that men would be welcome as supporters. Leadership by women was designed to highlight the fact that women were active in the campaign against nuclear weapons but were often not visible to the public as public speeches were mainly by men. A June 1981 CND demonstration outside RAF Brawdy in Wales, which had become a US listening post, was addressed solely by men, prompting Pettitt to get on stage to make an impromptu speech. Therefore, at the meetings and events along the way, women would be invited to speak.

== The march ==
The march started in Cardiff on 27 August 1981. There were around 36 women and some children, together with a few men. It passed the Royal Ordnance Factory in Llanishen and then Caerwent Training Area, where American munitions were stored. The march then went through Newport, Wales, Bristol, Bath, Melksham, Devizes, Marlborough and Hungerford to Newbury, with a detour to another US munitions base at RAF Welford. Some had only intended to join the march for the first day but continued to the end. Sue Lent walked with her husband and one-year-old son, who was in a push chair, wearing flip-flops. When she reached Newport she decided to do the whole march. She then took the bus back to Cardiff and packed, and her husband took her and her son back to Newport the following morning. Thalia Campbell and a group of teenage girls made a banner during the march, using an old sheet, held in place by bamboo sticks. This was carried at the end of the march to explain to delayed drivers why they were being held up. The walkers arrived at RAF Greenham Common on 5 September, where they initially handed a letter of protest to the base commandant, explaining their action as follows:

We fear for the future of all our children, and for the future of the living world which is the basis of all life. We have undertaken this action because we believe that the nuclear arms race constitutes the greatest threat ever faced by the human race and our living planet. We have chosen Greenham Common as our destination because it is this base which our Government has chosen for 96 ‘Cruise’ [missiles] without our consent.

The reception along the route was warm, except in Bristol, where only a handful of people attended to listen to speeches. Volunteers in smaller towns, however, cooked large meals and often provided excellent accommodation. In addition to McColl and Seeger, the Fallout Marching Band played an important role in keeping up the marchers' spirits when they were getting tired.

Media interest in the march was limited. On reaching RAF Greenham Common the marchers had hoped to be greeted by numerous supporters but there were relatively few there. Having bought padlocks the night before, a few of the women decided to chain themselves to the perimeter fence. This ceased after a few days. The frustration caused by the lack of sympathetic coverage made some of the marchers decide to stay at the base until the government agreed to a debate with them about nuclear weapons. This was ignored by the government so the women remained and the peace camp became established. Their determination was enhanced by the US commander aggressively telling Helen John that she could stay there as long as she liked as far as he was concerned. They were initially reliant on local people for supplies as they had not planned to remain at Greenham Common when they left Cardiff and were ill-equipped for the camp. Local sympathisers provided blankets, tents, and chairs, as well as food, baths, and use of their telephones.

== Later activities ==
Those who did not stay returned to Cardiff, from where "Women for Life on Earth" organised more peace marches. A march from Cardiff to RAF Brawdy took place in May and June 1982. In the summer of 1983 women walked from various parts of Britain, including Cardiff, to reach Greenham Common on the anniversary of the bombing of Hiroshima. Because groups left from different points of the compass to go to Greenham, the marches were known as the "Star" marches. Different parts of the group also began to undertake independent activism using the organisation's name. In response to jeers from the authorities along the lines of "Go tell it to the Russians", Pettitt, Cutler and Jean McCollister visited Moscow in May 1983 and organised follow-up visits for 30 British activists later that year and in 1984. They also published magazines at Greenham under the "Women for Life on Earth" name. Cutler was interviewed for the 2021 film Mothers of the Revolution about the Greenham women.

== Known Members ==
Ann Pettitt (1947-Current)

Karmen Cutler (1947-Current)

Lynne Whittemore (1955- unknown)

Liney Seward (1959-unknown)

Jean McCollister (unknown)
