= Helen John =

British peace activist (1937–2017)

Helen John (30 September 1937 – 5 November 2017) was one of the first full-time members of the Greenham Common peace camp in England, UK, and was a peace activist for over 30 years.

== Early life ==
Helen Doyle was born in south-west Essex. She qualified as a midwife and worked in South Africa for a time. She then returned to England and married Douglas John in 1963.

== Career ==
John was born in Romford to parents who worked at the Ford factory in Dagenham. Growing up during World War II, she recalled how anxious her parents were for the safety of their children during bombing raids which killed numerous friends and family. She also stated that her work in the NHS showed her how little government money was spent on health, and how much on the military.

In September 1981, Helen John joined a 100 mile march from Cardiff to Newbury to protest at the siting of ninety-four nuclear missiles at RAF Greenham Common airbase. Her experience at Greenham began a lifelong commitment to campaigning against war and for nuclear disarmament.

When she left home to join the march, her five children, the youngest of them being only three and a half years old, were to be looked after by her husband. Dissatisfied with the lack of publicity when the march arrived at Greenham RAF base, she decided she would live at the peace camp full-time, with several other women. She stayed for thirteen years, during which time she and husband divorced. She observed that while it was acceptable for men to leave their families and go off to war, if women left their families to fight for peace, they were shamed for it.

As a part of a small group, she occupied the sentry box at Greenham’s main gate. After a year, the camp became women only. By that time, 30,000 women had travelled to Greenham. During her time at Greenham, she was arrested and imprisoned several times, including thirty-two arrests for criminal damage. At her court cases, John used the public platform to argue her defense politically. She continued speak publicly to both combat the growth of militarism domestically and internationally, and raise awareness of conditions in women’s prisons and the commercial exploitation of women worldwide.

John's contribution to non-violent direction action lay in the nature of her activism; teaching women prisoners to read and write, donating clothes or providing women with a meal, a bath and a bed when they needed it.

In 1994 she helped set up a new women's camp in Yorkshire at RAF Menwith Hill which housed a US eavesdropping operation run by the US National Security Agency. She was one of the first people to be charged under new anti-terror legislation for walking 15ft across a sentry line there.

In October 2001, she attended the founding meeting of the Stop the War Coalition.

John's activism often mocked the authorities. Her use of non-violent direct action was in part designed to attract the attention of the media and politicians - for instance, standing against Tony Blair for the Sedgefield constituency in the 2001 and 2005 general elections, her campaign conducted from behind bars due to her conviction on charges of criminal damage. In 2001, she finished last of seven candidates, with 260 votes (0.6%), and in 2005 she finished 13th of fifteen candidates, with 68 votes (0.2%). During this time she served as a Vice-Chair of the Campaign for Nuclear Disarmament.

John's dedication to the peace movement and upholding the right to protest was expressed in every aspect of her life. Her energetic, challenging and inventive campaigning methods have inspired decades of young activists. After 25 years of activism, she was nominated for the Nobel Peace Prize in 2005 for ‘rendering valuable services to the cause of peace, justice and human dignity.’

John remained active in her old age. In 2010, at the age of 73, she was arrested for writing anti-Trident slogans on Edinburgh's high court building, together with Georgina Smith. They refused to pay fines and compensation and spent three weeks in prison. Three years later she was arrested for protesting drones at RAF Waddington.

In 2012, a documentary web series, Disarming Grandmothers, was released. This series portrayed the lives of Helen John and fellow campaigner Sylvia Boyes across six years, from their 'trial for terrorism' concerning the time when they trespassed into RAF Menwith Hill to their family life.

John died peacefully on 5 November 2017, aged 80. She is often considered to have been vital to the modern feminist movement.

== See also ==
- List of peace activists
