= Greenham Common Women's Peace Camp =

Peace camp in Berkshire, England

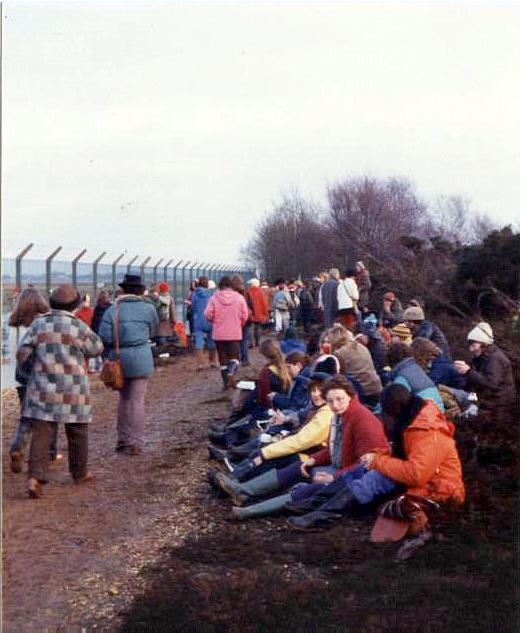
- Women gathering outside of the fence at Greenham Common in December 1982 in order to hold a demonstration against the cruise missiles
- Date: September 1981 – September 2000
- Location: RAF Greenham Common, Berkshire, England] 51°22′18″N 1°16′41″W
- Caused by: Storage of cruise missiles inside of RAF Greenham Common
- Goals: Removal of cruise missiles; End of use of nuclear weapons; World peace
- Status: Ended (September 2000)
- Result: Cruise missiles removed (1991)

Greenham Common Women's Peace Camp was a series of protest camps established to protest against nuclear weapons being placed at RAF Greenham Common in Berkshire, England. The camp began on 5 September 1981 after a female activist group, Women for Life on Earth, arrived at Greenham to protest against the government's decision to allow American cruise missiles to be stored there. After realising that the march alone was not going to get them the attention they needed to have the missiles removed, women began to stay at Greenham to continue their protest. The first blockade of the base occurred in March 1982 with 250 women protesting, during which 34 arrests occurred.

The camp became the central focus of the British peace movement and a global symbol of the antinuclear struggle and the centrality of women to it. Despite the installation of cruise missiles at Greenham in 1983, the protests, historian Martin Shaw argues, contributed decisively to the 1987 INF treaty which led to their removal in 1988. The camp was brought to a close in September 2000 to make way for the Commemorative and Historic Site on the land that housed the original Women's Peace Camp at Yellow Gate Greenham Common between the years 1981 and 2000.

== History ==
In September 1981, 36 women chained themselves to the base fence in protest against nuclear weapons. On 29 September 1982, the women were evicted by Newbury District Council but set up a new camp nearby within days. In December 1982, 30,000 women joined hands around the base at the Embrace the Base event, in response to the third anniversary of NATO's decision to house nuclear missiles on British soil. The courage and creativity of the Greenham women was highlighted by a small group climbing the fence to dance on the missile storage bunkers that were under construction on New Year's Day 1983.

Greenham Common peace sign

The camps became well known when on 1 April 1983, about 70,000 protesters formed a 14-mile (23 km) human chain from Greenham to the AWRE in Aldermaston and the Royal Ordnance Factory at Burghfield. The media attention surrounding the camp inspired people across Europe to create other peace camps. Another encircling of the base occurred in December 1983, with 50,000 women attending. Sections of the fence were cut and there were hundreds of arrests.

On 4 April 1984, the women were again evicted from the common; again, by nightfall many had returned to reform the camp. In January 1987, although Parliament had been told that there were no longer any women at Greenham, small groups of women cut down parts of the perimeter fence at Greenham Common every night for a week.

The protestors consisted of nine smaller camps at various gates around the base. Camps were named after the colours of the rainbow, as a way of contrasting against the green shades of the base. The first camp was called Yellow Gate, and others included Blue Gate with its New Age focus; Violet Gate with a religious focus; and Green Gate, which was women-only and did not accept male visitors.

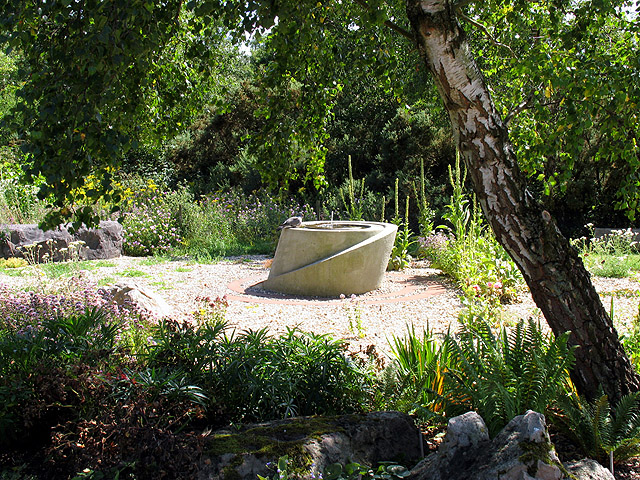
Memorial to Helen Thomas at Greenham

The last missiles left the base in 1991 as a result of the Intermediate-Range Nuclear Forces Treaty, but the camp remained in place until September 2000, after protesters won the right to house a memorial on the site. Although the missiles had been removed from the base, the camp was continued as part of the protest against the forthcoming UK Trident programme. Sarah Hipperson, who had been a part of the protest for all nineteen of its years, was among the last four women to leave the camp. The old camp was inaugurated as a Commemorative and Historic Site on 5 October 2002. There are seven standing stones encircling the "Flame" sculpture representing a campfire. Next to this there is a stone and steel spiral sculpture, engraved with the words "You can't kill the Spirit". There is also a plaque there for activist Helen Wyn Thomas, who was killed near the site in 1989. The site has since been given to the Greenham Common Trust to care for.

=== Local and national opposition to the Peace Camp ===
The Greenham women knew that their actions and presence were not entirely welcome in the local community. In an article Anne Seller, one of the Greenham women, remarked that the local pubs around Greenham refused to serve the women. People opposed to the protest would often meet in such places to think up ways of disrupting their activities. "Vigilante groups" would form to attack the women, noted Seller, making many of them afraid to venture into the town.

Neither were the local police friendly toward the protestors. Often police officers would release detained Greenham women in the middle of the night and if they drove them back to the base, would drop them off far from any established camp. The women were forced to walk long distances to rejoin the protest.

The Greenham women also experienced opposition from a local group by the name of Ratepayers Against the Greenham Encampments (RAGE), who were shopkeepers, businessmen, former military officers, retired professionals and local housewives from Newbury who disagreed with the peace camps. Along with a local branch of Women and Families for Defence, the opposition groups would campaign in Newbury with slogans such as: "Peace Women: You Disgust Us" and "Clean Up and Get Out". RAGE aimed to use local opinion and government to remove the Greenham women protesters, claiming they lured in illegal immigrants as well as did not represent a real concern for humanity and the future generations, because they left their children at home and were considered naïve children who did not understand the problems of international defence.

The Ministry of Defence called for an increased police presence at the base. Terrorists might be trying to infiltrate the base, the ministry claimed, pretending to be Greenham protesters. The Greenham women saw this as one more attempt to hinder their protest. The British government also enacted a set of by-laws in an effort to end the Peace Encampment at Greenham Common, which made it illegal to enter the base without permission, and sent hundreds of women to prison for criminal trespass in Spring 1985. These by-laws were deemed unlawful in 1990 by the House of Lords, which was a monumental victory for the Greenham women.

Some feminists opposed the disarmament movement, claiming there were more important issues to address at home. The opposition came from the idea that women should try to focus on the issues in their daily lives such as health and work instead of dedicating the time it takes to dismantle the patriarchy at the top. It was difficult to justify protesting nuclear weapons when equal rights within the home did not exist. Men were allowed to participate in the protests if invited by women, causing the women opposed to the protests to dislike the movement more. Women questioned if the disarmament protests were true feminist movements if men were allowed in the space, and it caused women to not take the protests as legitimate because they did not think a true feminist movement needed men to make a statement.

== Protest strategies ==
The women at Greenham used actions, posters, and songs to protest against the nuclear missiles and gain attention.

The first protest action undertaken at Greenham involved women chaining themselves to the fence of the base in September 1981. The most well-known protest actions that the Greenham women undertook were the Embrace the Base event and their human chain protests. At Embrace the Base, 30,000 women held hands around the perimeter fence. In April 1983, the Greenham women and their supporters created a 14-mile human chain. In late October 1983, the Greenham women arranged an action to take down the perimeter fence, which was described in the press release as "our Berlin Wall", where about four of the nine miles of perimeter fence were cut down. By using a distraction of dressing up as witches to fake their partaking in a Greenham Halloween party, the women were able to prevent the police from suspecting the cutting of the fence before it happened. In December of that year, another human chain was created, circling around the fence, while some parts of the fence were cut.

The Greenham women would often 'keen'. They would dress in black, and say that they were mourning for children who would be lost to nuclear war in the future.

Posters were used by the women at Greenham, and often featured the symbol of a spider web, meant to symbolise the fragility and perseverance of the Greenham women.

Singing was another protest strategy used by the Greenham women. Popular songs were sometimes used with their lyrics rewritten to support the anti-nuclear cause. Some of the songs were original, written by the women of the camps. In 1988, "Greenham Women Are Everywhere", the official songbook of the camp, was published.

== Importance of gender ==
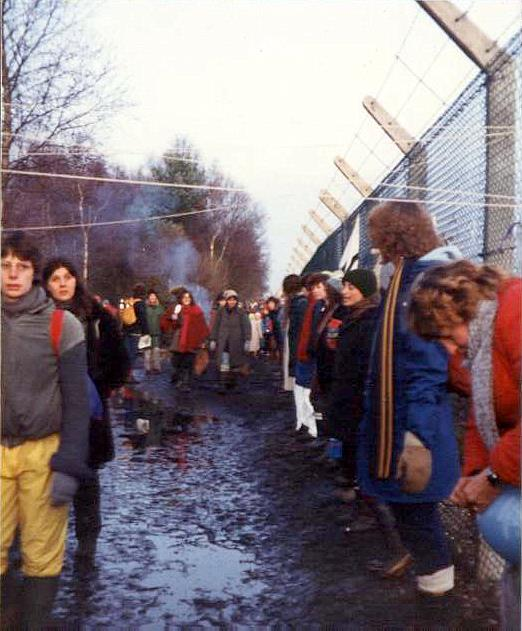
On 12 December 1982, 30,000 women held hands around the 6 miles (9.7 km) perimeter of the base, in protest against the decision to site American cruise missiles there.

In February 1982 it was decided that the protest should involve women only, which established it as the first and longest lasting peace encampment. This was important as the women were using their identity as mothers to legitimise the protest against nuclear weapons, all in the name of the safety of their children and future generations.

The spider web became one of the most-used symbols at the camp, because it is both fragile and resilient, as the Greenham women envisioned themselves. The Greenham women were notorious for dressing themselves up as witches in order to contrast the symbol of the evil witch with the actions of ordinary women at the base.

There were several instances when women entered the camp, effectively entering a "male" space. On New Year's Eve 1982, the women broke into the base for the first time; 44 women climbed over the military base's fence and climbed on top of the bunkers and danced around on them for hours. All the women were arrested, and 36 were imprisoned. On 1 April 1983, 200 women entered the base dressed as teddy bears. A "child" symbol like the teddy bear was a stark contrast to the highly militarised atmosphere of the base; the women again were highlighting the safety of their children and future generations of children.

The next major event was 'Reflect the Base' on 11 December 1983, when 50,000 women circled the base to protest against the cruise missiles which had arrived three weeks earlier. The day started as a silent vigil where women held up mirrors as to allow the base to symbolically look back at itself and its actions; however, the day ended with hundreds of arrests as the women pulled down large sections of the fence.

Upon breaching the barriers and entering the base, the women were making the statement that they would not stay at home and do nothing the way that women are traditionally expected to while the men take care of the serious "male" issues. Their refusal to go home at the end of each day was a challenge against the traditional notion that a woman's place was in the home. Many media outlets even questioned the behaviour of the Greenham women: if their children were so important to them, they asked, then why were they not home with them? The media tended to ignore the Greenham women's collective identity of "women as mothers" protecting the children and largely focused on the illegitimacy of the camp, describing it as a witches' coven laden with criminal activity, with the women posing a threat to family values and the state. One such part of the protest that the media ignored took place on 12 December 1982, where women hung pictures of their children on the fence. The idea surrounding this particular event was to hang representations of things the women loved on the fence; to many, this meant hanging pictures of their children. Candles were also brought to the protest to mourn the future of the children.

== Aftermath ==
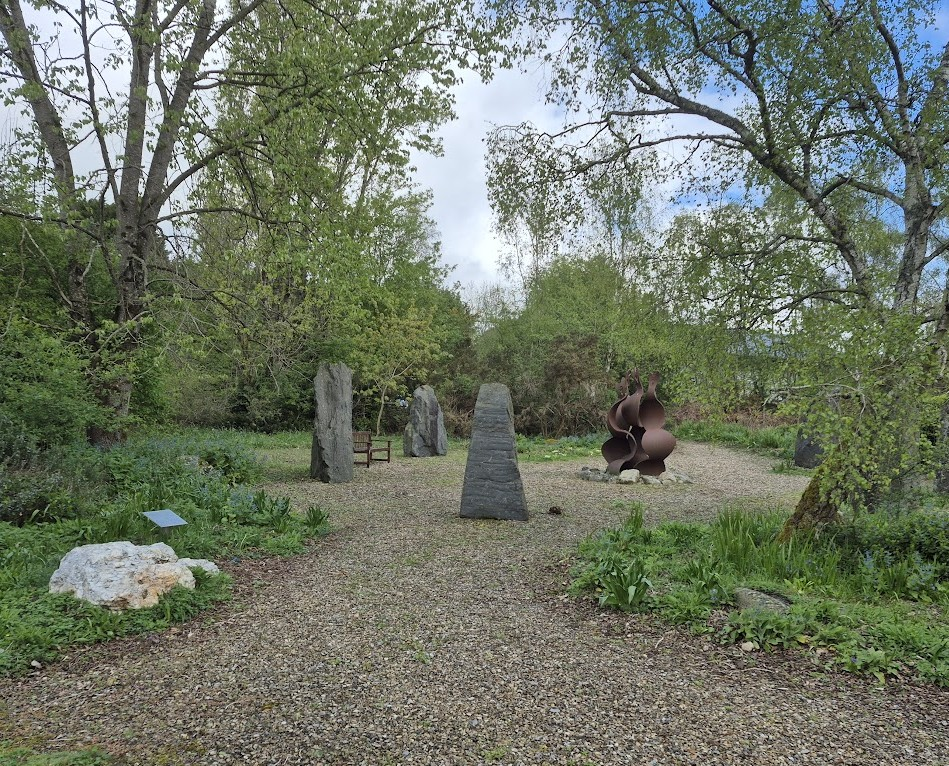
Greenham Common Peace Garden

In 2000, the fences surrounding the base were taken down. The site of the protests was turned into a memorial to honour the nuclear disarmament movement. The memorial consists of a garden with Welsh stones surrounding it. The memorial is meant to show peace and the fight against nuclear weapons. The rest of the land has been given back to the people and the local council.

== Participants ==
Among the members of the Greenham Common Women's Peace Camp and others who visited were:

- Rosy Bremer (1971–2025), spent four years at the camp and was the spokesperson who announced its closure
- Thalia Campbell (born 1937), one of the founders of the camp who made most of the banners displayed there
- Julie Christie (born 1940), actress, and occasional visitor to the camp
- Cynthia Cockburn (1934–2019), feminist academic at the City, University of London
- Alice Cook, co-author of Greenham Women Everywhere
- Karmen Cutler, one of the four women to organise the original march; visited Moscow to promote disarmament
- Margaretta D'Arcy (born 1934), actress, playwright, and activist; directed Yellow Gate Women, about the activities of the Greenham women
- Fran De'Ath, set up her own camp next to the service entrance and invited workers to her tipi for a cup of tea and a discussion
- Chris Drake, Greenham resident who came out as a lesbian while there; appeared in 2021 film Mothers of the Revolution about Greenham
- Lynette Edwell (born 1940), local resident who provided baths, food and office facilities; organised "telephone trees" to alert protestors to missile convoy movements
- Titewhai Harawira (1932–2023), Māori activist who visited Greenham
- Margaret Harrison (born 1940), feminist and artist who visited Greenham and whose installation, Greenham Common (Common reflections), recreates a part of the perimeter fence
- Sarah Hipperson (1927–2018), one of the last women to leave the camp; wrote a book on the legal cases of the women
- Katrina Howse (born 1958), an artist who spent longer at Greenham Common than anyone else
- Jean Hutchinson, at Greenham Common for almost two decades; among the last to leave. Successful in legal action that claimed the base breached common land rights
- Zohl de Ishtar (born 1953), after time at Greenham returned to Australian and opposed French nuclear testing in the Pacific
- Helen John (1937–2017), a 13-year resident who stood against Tony Blair in two general elections
- Rebecca Johnson, 5-year resident; founded the Acronym Institute for Disarmament Diplomacy
- Beth Junor (born 1958), author, with Howse, of Greenham Common Women's Peace Camp: A History of Non-Violent Resistance 1984-1995; language therapist
- Gwyn Kirk, one of 14 Greenham women to file a case against Ronald Reagan in New York; stayed in the US as a sociology professor
- Sue Lent, one of the original marchers, with her one-year-old son; became deputy leader of Cardiff council
- Imogen Makepeace, camp participant; climate activist; and Green Party politician
- Silver Moon, Australian peace activist, feminist, environmentalist and singer-songwriter at the camp
- Evelyn Parker, local resident who provided baths and food, organised other supplies for the campers and, with Edwell and others, used telephone trees to alert protestors in the south of England when missile convoys were leaving the base
- Ann Pettitt (born 1947), one of the organizers of the 1981 march of Welsh women to Greenham; wrote a book about the march
- Hazel Rennie (died 2016), camp participant, poet, president of UK branch of Women's International League for Peace and Freedom (WILPF)
- Peggy Seeger (born 1935), sang with Ewan MacColl on the original march, visited Greenham and wrote the song Carry Greenham Home
- Monica Sjöö (1938–2005), Swedish-born, British-based painter, writer and radical anarcho/ eco-feminist
- Georgina Smith (1929–2024), an artist who also campaigned at the Faslane Naval Base in Scotland
- Eunice Stallard (1916–2011), one of the first women to chain herself to the perimeter fence
- Fionn Stevenson (born 1959), member of the camp, tree house designer, and musician; architecture professor
- Helen Thomas (1966–1989), killed by a police vehicle at the camp
- Rowan Tilly, Greenham member who went on to carry out many peace, climate change and anti-GMO activities
- Frances Vigay (born 1970), member of the camp, arrested for entering the Atomic Weapons Establishment at Aldermaston
- Joan Wakelin (1928–2003), photographer who paid frequent visits to the camp in its early years
- Peggy Walford (died 2018), one of the last women to leave the camp; lifelong communist

== Related movements: the Moscow Trust Group and Window Peace (New York) ==
In May 1983 three women representing the Greenham Common Peace Camp (Karmen Cutler, Ann Pettitt, and US citizen Jean McCollister) flew to Moscow and met with the official Soviet Peace Committee and the unofficial "Group for Establishing Trust between the USSR and the USA". At the airport on 27 May the Moscow customs confiscated Jean McCollister's diary, which contained notes of her conversations with the Trust group.

The Greenham Common Women's Peace Camp inspired related peace movements in the U.K. as well as abroad. One such movement was Window Peace, a year-long live-in performance art installation in New York City. As a tribute to the protestors of the original movement, who at the time had been living outside of the Greenham RAF camp, as well as to the Seneca Women's Peace Encampment, women artists and activists created a rotating series of art installations in the store SohoZat at 307 West Broadway in Manhattan.

The Window Peace installation, created in 1986 by artist Susan Kleckner, took place in the Soho Zat storefront, located in lower Manhattan. As had been the practice of the Greenham Common movement, only women artists could participate; however, men were allowed to participate if they had been invited by a woman. Each week for an entire year, beginning 12 December 1986 until 11 November 1987, 51 women artists occupied the storefront window with their art. Among the artists were Susan Kleckner (also the originator), Ann Snitow, Dianna Moonmade, Sharon Jaddis, Tequila Minsky, Anne Meiman, Carol Jacobsen, Joyce George, Jane Winter, Marsha Grant, The Women of the Greenham and Seneca Movements, Catherine Allport, Eileen Jones, Susann Ingle, Sharon Smith, Linda Montano, Dominque Mazur, Cenen, Pamela Schumaker, Judy Trupin, Connie Samaras, and others.

== See also ==
- Anti-nuclear movement
- Campaign for Nuclear Disarmament
- Nuclear weapons of the United Kingdom
- Faslane Peace Camp
- Winifred Langton
- List of peace activists
- Seneca Women's Encampment for a Future of Peace and Justice
- Women Strike for Peace
- Women for Life on Earth
- List of women pacifists and peace activists

== Related works ==
=== Primary sources ===
- February 1983 Greenham Women's Peace Camp Newsletter (Zine-style newsletter created by members to mobilize new participants, circulate information about events, document their actions and create forums for cultivating ideas, demands, tactics, and analyses)
- Walking to Greenham, how the peacecamp began, by Ann Pettitt. Published by Honno.
- Greenham Women Are Everywhere , the official songbook of the Greenham Common Women's Peace Camp
- Seller, Anne (1985). "Greenham: A Concrete Reality". Frontiers: A Journal of Women Studies. 8 (2): 26–31. doi:10.2307/3346050. JSTOR 3346050.

Several sets of papers related to Greenham Common Women's Peace Camp are held at The Women's Library at the Library of the London School of Economics, including;

- Greenham Common Collection ref 5GCC
- Records of Greenham Common Women's Peace Camp (Yellow Gate) ref 5GCW
- Jayne and Juliet Nelson (Yellow Gate) ref 7JAN

The peace camp was also the subject of a 1983 documentary by Beeban Kidron and Amanda Richardson, Carry Greenham Home.

=== Secondary sources/anthologies ===
- Cook, Alice; Kirk, Gwyn, eds. (1983). Greenham Women Everywhere: Dreams, Ideas, and Actions from the Women's Peace Movement. Pluto Press.
- Fairhall, David (2006). Common Ground: The Story of Greenham. I.B. Tauris.
- Harford, Barbara; Hopkins, Sarah, eds. (1984). Greenham Common: Women at the Wire. The Women's Press.
- Kerrow, Kate; Mordan, Rebecca (2021). Out of the Darkness: Greenham Voices 1981–2000. Foreword by Frankie Armstrong. The History Press.
- Laware, Margaret L. (2004). "Circling the Missiles and Staining Them Red: Feminist Rhetorical Invention and Strategies of Resistance at the Women's Peace Camp at Greenham Common". NWSA Journal. 16 (3): 18–41. JSTOR 4317078.
- Liddington, Jill (1989). The Long Road to Greenham: Feminism and Anti-Militarism in Britain Since 1820. Virago Press.
- Lowry, Maggie (1983). "A Voice from the Peace Camps: Greenham Common and Upper Heyford". In Thompson, Dorothy (ed.). Over Our Dead Bodies: Women Against the Bomb. Virago Press. pp. 73–77.
- Pettitt, Ann (2006). Walking to Greenham: How the peace camp began and the Cold War ended. Published by Honno.
- Roseneil, Sasha (1995). Disarming Patriarchy: Feminism and Political Action at Greenham. Open University Press.
- Seller, Anne (1985). "Greenham: A Concrete Reality". Frontiers: A Journal of Women Studies. 8 (2): 26–31. doi:10.2307/3346050. JSTOR 3346050.

=== Plays ===
- Harrison, Tony.The Common Chorus. London: Faber and Faber. 1992. p. 87. ISBN 0-571-14723-2.
- Kirkwood, Lucy (2015). Bloody Wimmin. Nick Hern Books. ISBN 9781780015934.
- Lunn, Jennifer (2023). Es & Flo. Nick Hern Books. ISBN 9781839041402.

=== Musicals ===
- Beyond The Fence (2016) A wholly computer created musical in which computers scripted, scored, and provided lyrics to a musical about the Greenham Commons Women's Peace Camp.
- Gates of Greenham (1985) A Peace Oratorio, composed by Tony Biggin and performed by the Quaker Festival Orchestra and Chorus, subsequently recorded by the festival chorus and The London Philharmonic Orchestra

=== Films ===
- Mothers of the Revolution (2021) – documentary narrated by Glenda Jackson
- Gentle, Angry Women (2025) - documentary film directed by Barbara Santi of Awen Productions and Folklife Films.

=== Novels ===
- Smith, Ali (2017). Winter. Hamish Hamilton. ISBN 9780241207024.
- Davies, Stephanie (2020). Other Girls Like Me. Bedazzled Ink Publishing Company. ISBN 978-1-949290-38-7.
