= Sarah Hipperson =

- Born: Sarah Hanlon; 1927; Glasgow, Scotland, United Kingdom
- Died: 15 August 2018 (aged 90)
- Known for: Greenham Common Women's Peace Camp

Sarah Hipperson (née Hanlon) (1927 – 8 October 2018) was a midwife, magistrate and peace campaigner who spent 17 years living at the Greenham Common Women's Peace Camp on RAF Greenham Common protesting against the siting of American nuclear cruise missiles in the United Kingdom. In 1982, she founded Catholic Peace Action. Her nonviolent resistance resulted in over 20 imprisonments and several appearances in court. She lived to see the transformation of Greenham Common back into use by the public and was one of the last four women to leave the camp. She appeared as herself in the documentary Margaret Thatcher: The Woman Who Changed Britain.

In Hipperson's book, Greenham Common: Non-Violent Women v The Crown Prerogative, she documented her legal challenges during her anti-war campaigning.

== Personal life ==
Hipperson was survived by her husband, five children, six grandchildren and one great grand child.
