= Faslane Peace Camp =

Anti-nuclear weapons protest

Coordinates: 56°2′46″N 4°48′27″W

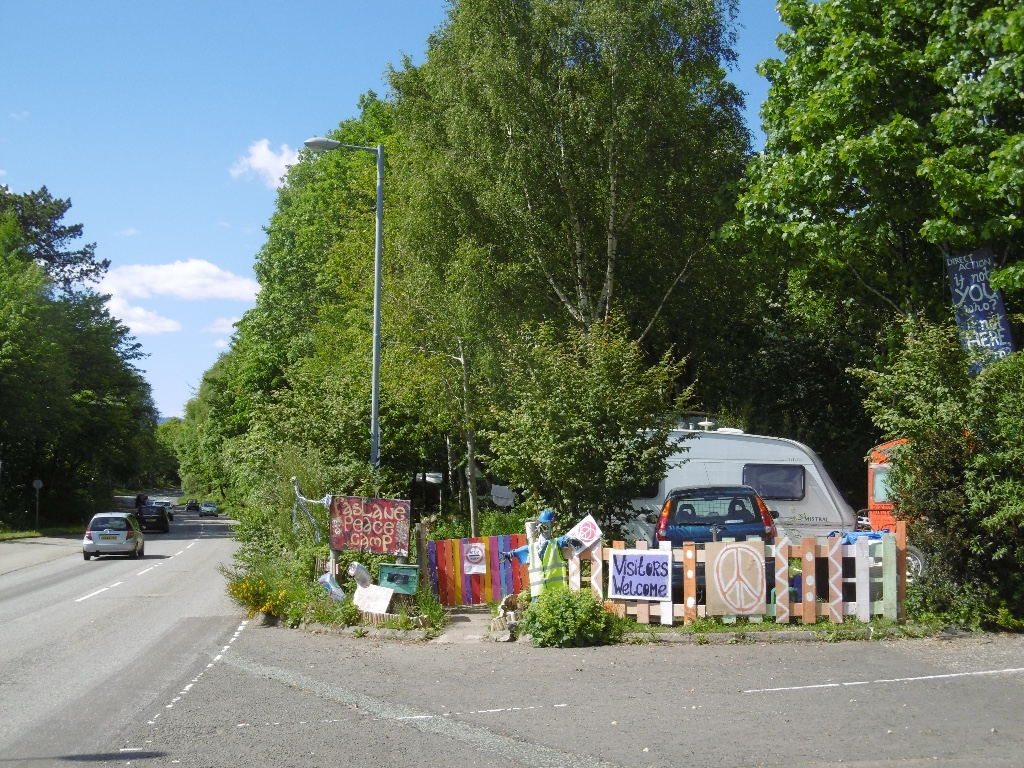
Entrance to the Peace Camp

Faslane Peace Camp is a permanent peace camp sited alongside Faslane Naval base in Argyll and Bute, Scotland. It has been occupied continuously, in a few different locations, since 12 June 1982. In 1984, the book Faslane: Diary of a Peace Camp was published, co-written by the members of the peace camp at the time. There is also a secondary site on Raeberry Street in North Glasgow.

== Location ==
The site and look of the camp has varied considerably over the years, depending on the number and attitude of the residents. At one point there were two sites (one at each main gate) with distinct political attitudes (roughly characterised as anarchist and socialist). The camp is well established, with mains water, a conventional toilet, a telephone, a large kitchen and living room, running water and a bath. There is planning permission for 12 caravans. As of late there is no hot water. The tenancy was briefly ended in 1998 when the council borders changed. The new council then organised an eviction order but decided not to spend money on a large-scale eviction.

== History ==
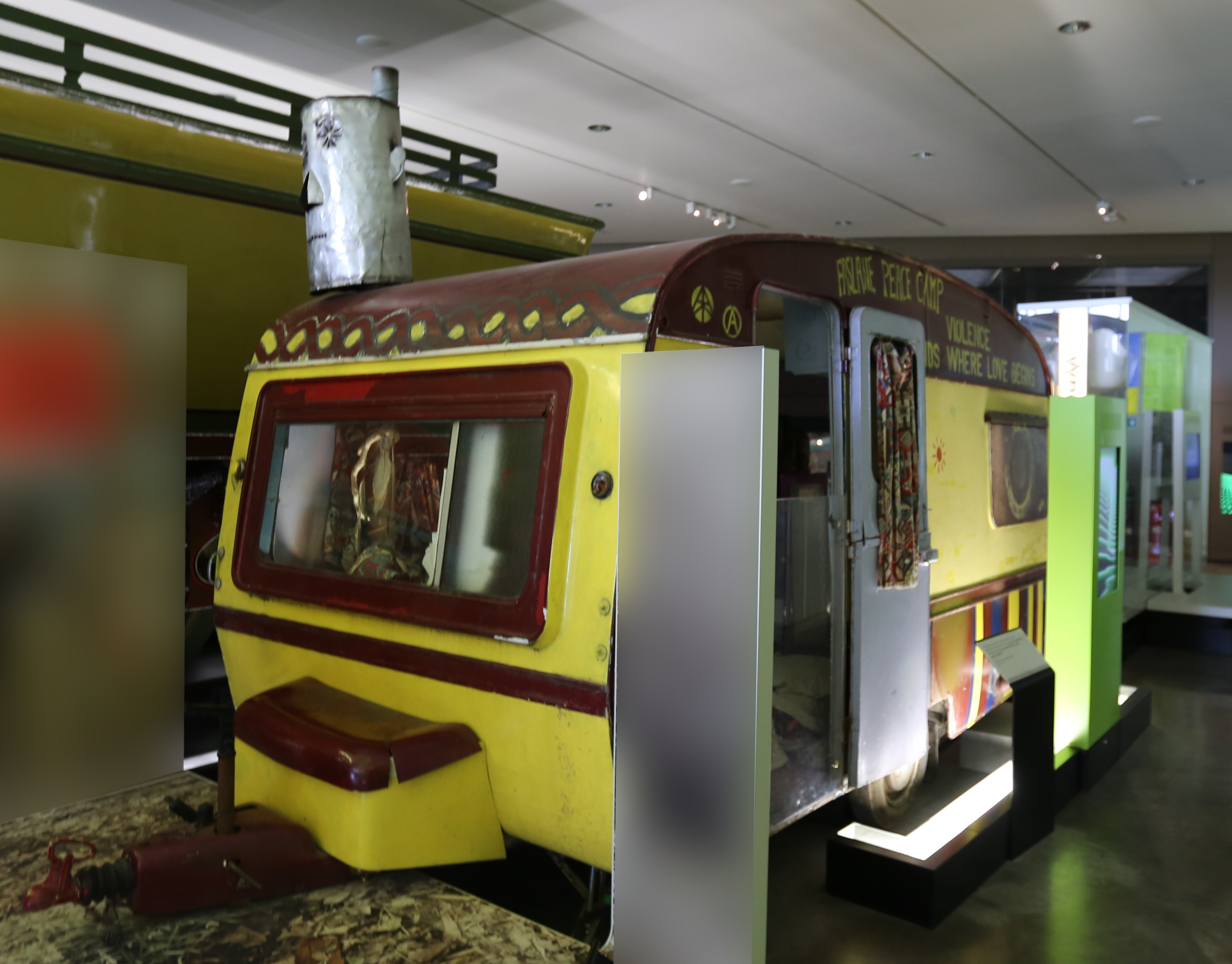
Faslane Peace Camp caravan at Glasgow's Riverside Museum

The camp was begun when anti-nuclear campaigners Bobby and Margaret Harrison put a tent beside the A814 in June 1982.

In 1999, a caravan which had been previously used by activists was put on display in an exhibition at the Glasgow Museum of Transport, which also included a four-minute film about the camp.

By 2015 the number of permanent protesters had fallen to around six. By September 2021 it had gone down to three.

In 2021, the camp resurfaced in the media through its portrayal in the British television drama Vigil, which is set in a fictionalised version of Faslane. Though the BBC intended to film on location, the occupants of the camp felt that the drama's script was inaccurate and misleading and refused.

== Protests ==
Camp residents have occasionally breached the security of the naval base by getting inside the fence, by canoeing or swimming into the base, by successfully disrupting the road transportation of the Trident missile warheads, which are heavily guarded by the Special Escort Group (Ministry of Defence Police), and by blockading the two gates. They are also active, with Trident Ploughshares and CND, in large public blockades of the base, attended by members of the public and a few politicians. Such annual events aim to keep the base closed for as long as possible by preventing its staff from arriving for work, and usually involve large numbers of protesters being arrested.

=== Faslane 365 ===
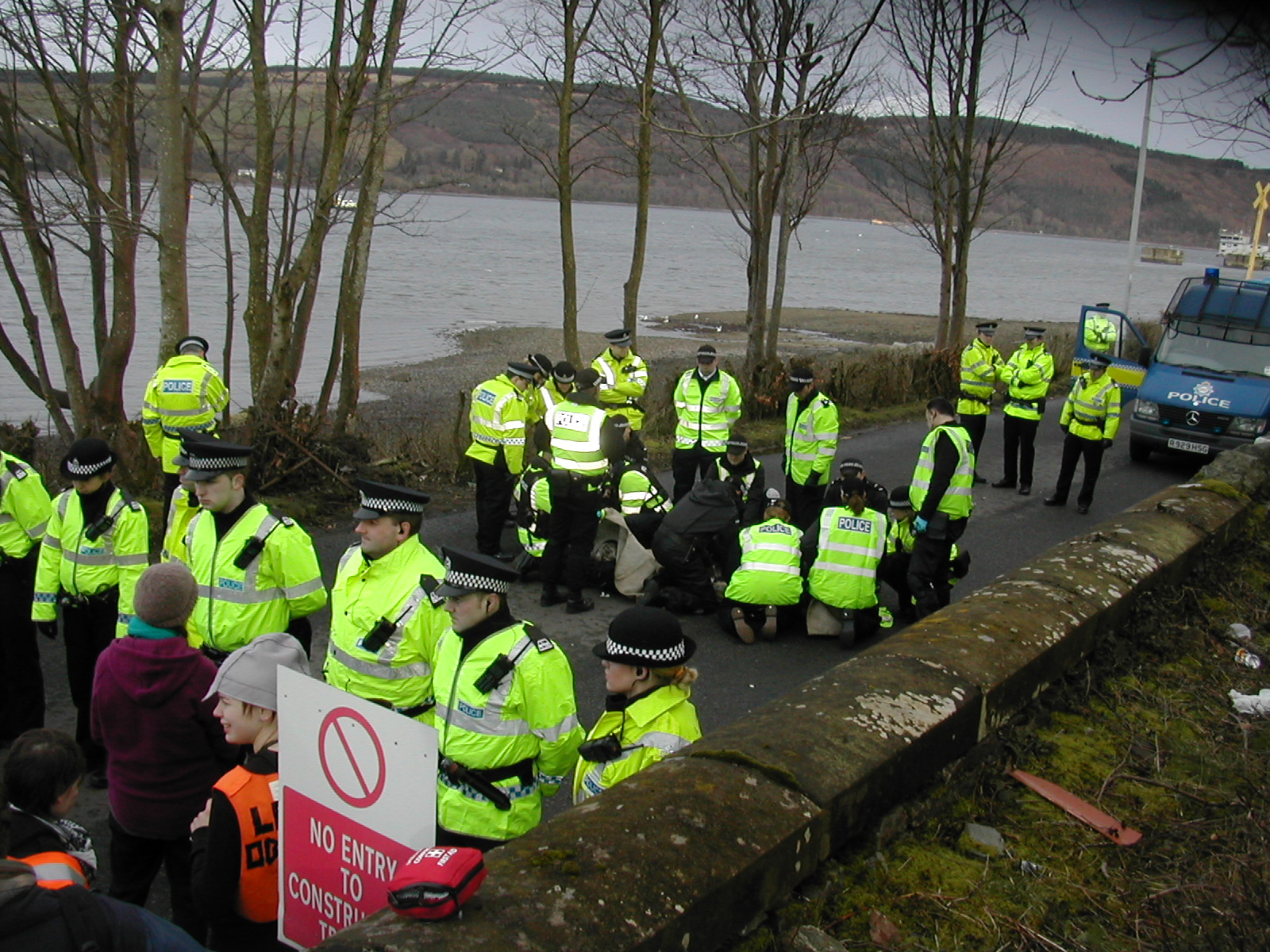
Police dismantling a blockade of protesters from York at the south gate of the Faslane base

The Faslane 365 campaign was an effort to establish a continuous protest at the base for a 365-day period using autonomous groups of 100 people.

The campaign was launched in September 2006 with the first protest action commencing on 1 October 2006 carried out by a campaigning group of women associated with protests at Greenham Common.

Arrests were made on 2 October of twelve women, and on 9 October of seven unspecified people. On 16 October 23 Swedes and 19 Finns were arrested.

There had been 473 arrests up to 8 January 2007. The most recent independent corroboration of the number of arrests appeared in The Guardian on 12 December 2006, in an article which reported that there had been 344 arrests up to that date.

On 7 January 2007, a group of around 40 world-renowned academics including Sir Richard Jolly and 25 students from Oxford, Cambridge, Sussex and Edinburgh held a seminar discussing the replacement of the Trident missiles at the base. Protesters subsequently managed to stage the most successful blockade of the campaign (apart from a negotiated three-day blockage over Christmas) so far closing the North Gate for six hours. All those who blockaded were arrested and held overnight. The majority of these arrests were for breach of the peace, with 22 prosecutions being made; the vast majority of arrested protesters were released, receiving a letter from the Procurator Fiscal's office explaining that although "evidence is sufficient to justify my bringing you before the Court on this criminal charge", the Procurator Fiscal has "decided not to take such proceedings".

== Political situation ==
The presence of the Faslane base is also an issue in Scottish politics. The Scottish National Party, the Scottish Socialist Party and the Scottish Green Party all oppose the deployment of nuclear weapons, although the Scottish National Party has claimed that it would retain the base for the servicing of conventionally armed and powered naval units.

It is not unusual for members of these Scottish political parties, and indeed some from the Labour Party, to attend rallies outside Faslane. One of its founder members, Les Robertson, went on to become a Labour Party Councillor on the local Dumbarton Council and is a regular candidate for the Scottish Socialist Party. Robertson has served two prison sentences for protests he has taken part in at the Faslane base, the first in 1983 when he was still resident at the camp, and the most recent in 2005. Various other Scottish politicians have been involved in protests at Faslane.

== See also ==
- Anti-nuclear movement in the United Kingdom
- Greenham Common Women's Peace Camp
- Nuclear weapons of the United Kingdom
- Protest camp
