= Ann Pettitt =

Ann Pettitt (born 1947) is an English activist. With other women she started the Greenham Common Women's Peace Camp by marching from Cardiff to RAF Greenham Common in Berkshire in 1981. She published the 2006 book Walking to Greenham.

== Life ==
Pettitt was born in 1947 in Ulverston in the Lake District, England. She studied English at the University of Bristol, then squatted in the East End of London from 1969 until 1977, working as a teacher and a legal clerk. She moved to a smallholding in Llanpumsaint, Wales and participated in the anti-nuclear movement.

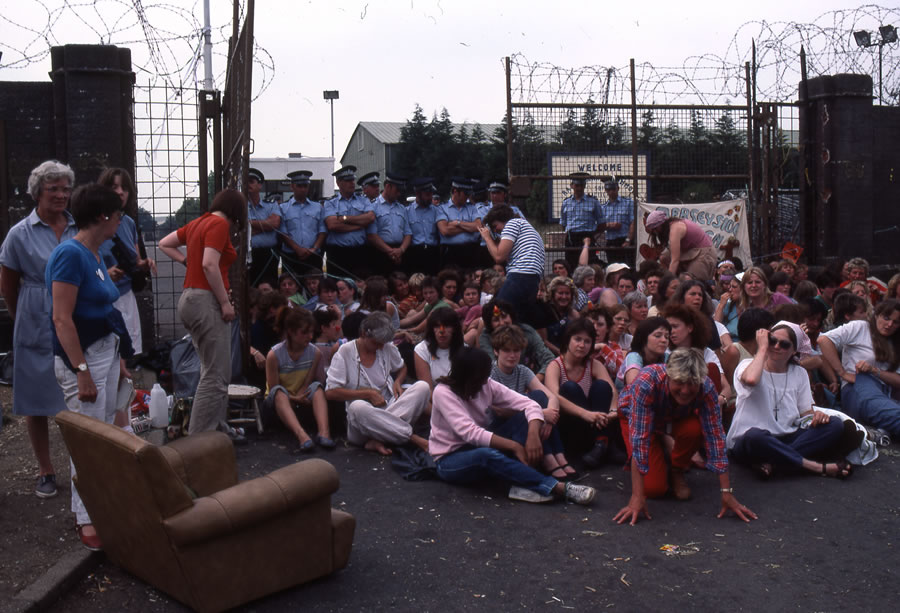
A 1982 protest at the gates of RAF Greenham Common

After reading a newspaper article about the USA putting nuclear cruise missiles at RAF Greenham Common in Berkshire, England, Pettitt was outraged and decided to organise a march to the base from Cardiff. She joined with three other women and marched 120 miles under the name Women for Life on Earth in 1981. The protest was the beginning of the Greenham Common Women's Peace Camp, which lasted until 2000, having seen the last cruise missile leave in 1991. Since she had her life and family in Wales, Pettitt did not live at the camp and last visited it in 1984. In 1982, she organised a peace visit to the USSR with a group of women, meeting the official Soviet Peace Committee and independent groups. She published a book entitled Walking to Greenham in 2006. The previous year, she set up a charity called Safer Birth In Chad to train midwives in birthing practices.

== Selected works ==
- Pettitt, Ann (2006). Walking to Greenham. Dinas Powys, Wales: Honno. ISBN 9781870206761.
