= Women's Peace Train =

Women's protests against war

The Women's Peace Train has traditionally been used by women's groups as a means of protesting war, militarization, and the impact of violence on women and children. The idea of what peace means has evolved over decades of protest. Initially ending or preventing war was the primary goal of these protests, but in the nuclear era, it became evident that weapons had the power to devastate environments and populations leading to expansion of concerns. Ethnic and racial tensions, as well as disruption of sustainable development goals have also been addressed in peace train actions. There have been numerous women's peace trains on almost every continent since the early 20th century.

== Background ==
Women's Peace Train emerged in the twentieth century as a term to figuratively describe women onboard with the international peace movement, or literally to portray women who physically traversed from different places by rail or convoy in support of peace. At the start of World War I, in 1915 women from throughout Europe traveled by train to attend the founding congress of the Women's International League for Peace and Freedom at The Hague, Netherlands. At the end of the conference two delegations of women were appointed to encourage the heads of states of warring nations to come together and solve their disputes diplomatically. Emily Greene Balch, Chrystal Macmillan, Cornelia Ramondt-Hirschmann, and Rosika Schwimmer visited neutral countries and Jane Addams, Alice Hamilton, Aletta Jacobs, and Mien van Wulfften Palthe traveled to warring nations, with the goal of persuading heads of state to form a neutral mediating body for solving international disputes. In the midst of war, the delegates traveled by train, criss-crossing Europe, and meeting with heads of state over the next several months. The women successfully obtained agreement from reluctant foreign ministers to participate in, or at least not to oppose, the creation of a mediation organization. As US President Woodrow Wilson was not ready to initiate a mediating body while the war continued and his re-election had been decided, the League of Nations was not created until 1920, after the war was over.

During the Cold War period, trips were organized primarily to oppose nuclear testing and the spread of nuclear acquisition, as well as to promote universal disarmament, and end hostilities from the superpowers and their allies through international cooperation. By the mid-1980s, women had begun to use peace train campaigns to link militarism with violence against women, and sought to prevent destruction of the environment from nuclear warfare and the spread of power plants. By the 1990s, women's peace trains were being organized to protest racism and ethnic conflicts and tension and by the 2000s to raise awareness that conflict and violence against women and children prevented countries from reaching sustainable development goals. Passage of the United Nations Security Council Resolution 1325 acknowledged the disproportionate impact of armed conflict on women and children, calling for member nations to adopt gender perspectives in policies and programs which dealt with conflict resolution and post-conflict reconstruction. Since its passage in 2000, there has been recognition that peace and security depend on development policies and programs which include protections and equal opportunities for women and children, concerns which have been incorporated into women's peace train actions.

== New York City to Washington, D.C., USA (1962) ==
On 15 January 1962, around 1,800 peace activists organized by Ruth Chenven and members of Women Strike for Peace boarded a train at Pennsylvania Station in New York City. The activists, mainly from Connecticut, New Jersey, and New York were traveling to Washington, D.C. to meet up with activists from twenty other states and protest nuclear testing and demand universal disarmament. Newspapers reported that it was the longest train to ever leave the station, and that the delegation was so large it needed two trains, but still over 200 women had to stand on the journey. Among the participants were Ruth Gage-Colby, Valerie Delacorte, and Hedwig Hass Turkenkopf, a former mayor of Cedar Grove, New Jersey. The train made stops to pick up more women in Trenton, New Jersey, Philadelphia, Pennsylvania, and Baltimore, Maryland. Upon arriving in Washington, they took thirty chartered buses to the White House, where they planned to meet with President John F. Kennedy and congressional leaders. The president did not meet with them, but the activists met with Adrian Fisher, deputy director of the Arms Control and Disarmament Agency, and Congressmen Edwin B. Dooley and Robert R. Barry, both of New York. Despite heavy rains, they also picketed the embassies of Great Britain, France, and the Soviet Union before leaving Washington. In December 1962, some of the participants in the peace train were called to testify before the House Un-American Activities Committee, as suspected communists. The women either denied affiliation with communists or invoked their right to refuse testifying under the Fifth Amendment to the United States Constitution.

== Montreal to Ottawa, Canada (1962) ==
In 1960, journalist Lotta Dempsey called for Canadian women to actively oppose nuclear war and involve themselves in peace initiatives. In answer to her call, the Canadian Voice of Women for Peace (VOW) was formed. Thérèse Casgrain became president of the organization in 1962 and led the campaign to try to persuade Prime Minister John Diefenbaker and his government to forgo acquiring nuclear weapons. Casgrain chartered a train for 300 to 400 activists, their children, and a few male supporters to travel from Montreal to Ottawa to urge the government to work towards ending the arms race and Cold War militarization. The women who participated included VOW members and French, Jewish, and Slavic representatives of other women's organizations. The passengers boarded the train on 7 March 1962, at Windsor station, stopped at Westmount station, and then traveled west to Ottawa returning the same day. After arriving in Ottawa, the women were met by a busload of women from Ontario and marched to Parliament Hill carrying a laundry basket full of telegrams from throughout Canada supporting VOW's anti-war stance. They were met by an English-speaking Member of Parliament, and demanded that a French-speaker be sent. The women were surveilled by the Royal Canadian Mounted Police, which created dossiers on the activists fearing that they were communist sympathizers, which VOW women denied.

On 22 October 1962, as the Cuban Missile Crisis came to a head, US President Kennedy broadcast on television the news that the Soviet Union was building missile sites in Cuba and demanded that they be dismantled. Diefenbaker refused to call for the Canadian Armed Forces to be mobilized to support the US, but the crisis spurred cabinet talks about whether Canada should acquire nuclear weapons. In a complicated plan,Howard Charles Green, the Minister of External Affairs proposed that nuclear weapons should not be stored on Canadian soil, but that they should be acquired and stored in the US, where they would be held until needed for an emergency. Douglas Harkness, the Minister of National Defence, argued against the plan because in his view, in light of the crisis, Canadians wanted security. Casgrain and Solange Chaput-Rolland led a second trip on 1 November, picking up activists at Windsor, Westmount, Montréal-Ouest, Dorval, Pointe Claire, and Sainte-Anne-de-Bellevue stations, before arriving at Union Station in Toronto. Once in Ottawa, they silently marched to the House of Commons and met with Green. Their message was to again urge the government to work to end the arms race, ban nuclear testing, and support international cooperation. The activists were ineffective as public sentiment had shifted to support for maintaining a nuclear arsenal and coordinating it through international diplomacy. Harkness resigned on 3 February 1963 out of frustration with the failure to resolve the nuclear question. Two days later a no confidence vote caused the formal dissolution of Parliament. Diefenbaker's inaction on the nuclear weapons question was a major reason for the defeat of his party in the following election.

== Stockholm, Sweden to Smolensk, Russia (1982) ==
In July 1982, Scandinavian women, taking part in Peace March '82 boarded a peace train traveling from Stockholm, Sweden to Leningrad, in the Soviet Union. Around 300 women from Denmark, Finland, Norway, and Sweden rode the train to attend planned rallies in Leningrad, Moscow, Minsk, Kalinin, and Smolensk to protest the arms race. The activists, who were part of Women for Peace from Scandinavia were sponsored by the European Nuclear Disarmament organization and the Campaign for Nuclear Disarmament. The Fort Worth Star-Telegram reported that the protesters would be the first Western peace demonstrators to be officially welcomed and permitted to tour the Soviet Union. The signs and slogans which appeared on their protest banners were subject to Soviet approval. The approved messages called for actions by all Cold War adversaries to work for peace, supporting neither NATO nor Warsaw Pact allies. Eva Nordland, a Norwegian who was one of the organizers of the trip, reiterated that the focus was not on geopolitical divisions, but rather to raise awareness that backing the use of nuclear weapons was supporting human extinction. The slogans included "No to nuclear weapons in Europe, East and West!", "No to nuclear weapons in the world!", "Yes to disarmament and peace!" The women began their march on Kirov Street in central Leningrad and traversed some 3,000 miles, calling for an end to nuclear proliferation and international cooperation. In actuality, the protesters did little demonstrating, as the Soviet-organized event had the women spending time traveling long distances by train and attending a series of sight-seeing tours. Contact with Soviet citizens was limited, as the women's activities were carefully orchestrated and controlled. Despite the restrictions, Danielle Grünberg, national coordinator of the British Women's Peace Alliance; Cees van der Vel, a Dutch journalist; and Jean Stead, a reporter for The Guardian, met with members of the Group to Establish Trust between the USSR and the USA, including Olga Lvovna Medvedkova and her husband Yuri Medvedkov. The "Trust-Builders", as the group members called themselves, were independent of the government and advocated for "détente from below", meaning that peace would more likely be achieved by an informed mass movement, rather than government action.

After the Scandinavian women left, the Soviet government announced through TASS that the peace march was on-going for its fifteenth day. The Soviet Peace Committee, according to author and diplomat Clive Rose, attempted to "exploit" the Scandinavian women's protest and tie it to one of their own. They organized a train voyage from Moscow, which passed through Kyiv, Budapest, and Bratislava, on its way to Vienna. Participants took part in demonstrations at each stop. Arriving in Vienna, they joined with a group of peace activists from Berlin and Balkan protestors who had participated in a march from Greece and Romania. In Vienna, the protestors took part in an anti-US—anti-NATO rally, which focused on change of Western policies, to counter a perceived Anti-Soviet—Anti-Socialist theme in peace movements. Even with the limitations and mixed-outcomes, Grünberg deemed the action successful because it confirmed women's leading role in the movement for peace and disarmament.

== Brisbane to Fremantle, Australia (1984) ==
In 1983, an activist organization called Women For Survival, hosted the Pine Gap Women's Peace Camp at Pine Gap, a joint Australian-US base near Alice Springs, in the Northern Territory of Australia, which was created to track nuclear research and testing, as well as adherence to arms control treaties. The success of the camp inspired the Western Australian affiliate of the Women's Action for Nuclear Disarmament to work with Women For Survival to create the Sound Women's Peace Collective in order to plan another peace encampment for Point Peron in Cockburn Sound, near the Stirling Naval Base, a docking station used by the Royal Australian Navy and for US warships. The US military presence was opposed by women because more sailors increased prostitution in the area and furthered Cold War divisions. According activist Gail Green the purpose of allowing US warships to dock was to give the US a "vantage point from which to spy on and attack the Soviet Union". Initial plans were to utilize railway travel to take the women from the Pacific coast of Brisbane, with stops in Sydney, Broken Hill, and Port Pirie, to the Indian Ocean coast of Fremantle. Because of difficulties in paying to charter the train, activists decided to use a convoy of buses to transport the women, but the association with the train remained because of the pre-event publicity. Fifty activists left Brisbane on 27 November 1984, and were joined by two hundred women the following day from Nimbin, Lismore, and Sydney. Leaving from Belmore Park, their convoy of buses was met by 100 cars at Perth. On 1 December Federal Election Day, the women arrived at the campsite, which was designated as a women-only space. There were around 1,000 participants from throughout Australia, as well as Denmark, Germany, Japan and New Zealand, who settled in the camp.

The Sydney Morning Herald reported that media totally ignored the women's action, but writer Joan Williams reported that there was wide newspaper coverage which depicted the activists with negative stereotypes, labeling them as "violent lesbians", "man-haters", and members of the "feminist lunatic fringe". Opposition members of Parliament questioned why the Labour government had granted permission to the women to set up the camp and expressed their outrage on radio broadcasts. These media reports led to a variety of attacks on the women, including verbal assaults, tires being slashed, car windows being broken, and fires being lit in the scrub surrounding the camp. The women were forced to patrol the camp perimeter at all hours of the day and night. Although invited to meet with the women on 3 December, both the base commander and US naval attaché failed to show up for the 10 a.m. appointment, to discuss ending the Australian-US military alliance, end the exploitation of women by military personnel, protect the environment, and pledge to support peace initiatives, a nuclear-free world, and redirection of defense spending to social and environmental programs. 500 women and children occupied the Garden Island causeway while Federal Police commander Frank Pinu negotiated with naval commander Warren Hamlyn to meet with the activists. He finally agreed to meet with them, to relay their demands to Minister for Defence Gordon Scholes, and to attempt to get Scholes to meet with them the following week. His efforts were unsuccessful, but in the meantime, the activists carried out other symbolic protest activities through street theatre and water ballet performances.

The largest protest, held on 6 December and called "Break the Sound Barrier", was an attempt to breach the gate that halted entry to the causeway. The women were halted by a wall of federal police. Some women who managed to climb the gate were thrown back over it, while other activists staged a mock invasion using a flotilla of rubber ducks. Police responded violently when pushing the women away and seventy-five women were arrested. Three women were taken to the hospital while the rest remained in custody at the Fremantle Police Station. Forty women refused to post bail and remained in jail overnight. On 12 December most of the activists were fined $79 and released. Two who refused to pay were taken to Bandyup Women's Prison. Daily protests continued with a few arrests each day. On 11 December, two women were arrested at the protest at the gate, and 19 others were arrested and charged with trespassing, while waiting in the foyer of the Council House, Perth to meet with the US naval attaché. When 500 women marched through the red-light district on the night of 12 December 250 police on foot, horses, and motorcycles accompanied them. Although trouble had been expected, none occurred. The encampment finished on 14 December and the activists returned home. While the women's demands went unanswered, they did receive international news coverage of their struggle against the military base. Women For Survival continued protest actions against US warship activity in Australia and the related issues of peace and violence, throughout the 1980s.

== Tbilisi to the Autonomous Republic of Abkhazia, Georgia (1993) ==
During the Soviet period, suppressing protest and national identity was formalized policy. The dissolution of the Soviet Union, beginning in the late 1980s, brought ethnic conflicts between Georgia and its Abkhaz Autonomous Soviet Socialist Republic to a head. At that time, half of the population in Abkahzia was Georgian, 17% of the remainder were Abkhazian and 33% were of other ethnicity (Armenians, Russians etc.). In 1989, the government of the Autonomous Republic of Abkhazia had asked Moscow to sever the connection to Georgia and make the region a separate republic of the Soviet Union. When the 1991 Georgian referendum was held, 61% of the eligible voters in Abkhazia voted in favor of independence, but ethnic Abkhazian voters boycotted the polls. In July 1992, the Abkhazia region declared independence from Georgia, escalating the issues into war, in which the Abkhaz side received Russian support. Because of a traditional custom that men in combat would stop fighting if a woman stood between combatants, the state used the tradition as a rationale to send women on a peace train into the battle. The train was organized by film director Keti Dolidze, for its publicity value and was filmed for broadcast on the official television station. Women were eager to participate because many of their sons had patriotically rushed off to battle and they wanted the war to end to bring their children home.

According to the report written by Tamara Dragadze, the train left Tbilisi on 20 September 1993, during the battle for Sukhumi, Abkhazia's capital, with several thousand women, but inflated numbers make estimating the participants difficult. They traveled to Khashuri, where they were met by women who boarded the train and others who brought them food and Dragadze urged women to come together. The next stop was in Kutaisi, where chess champion Nana Alexandria called for Georgians to stop fighting each other. They traveled through Samtredia, where an army general told them to turn back because the women in Mingrelia were angry over the deaths of their children. As there were Mingrelian women on the train, who assured the passengers this was not true, the train went forward, stopping for a rally in Gali in the Abkhazia Republic. The message of the gathering there was that peace was needed to reunite all Georgians. The women in train also cited the mothers in the Caucasus having a right to intervene in an attempt to stop the men fighting. However, by the time the train reached Ochamchire in Abkhazia, ethnic Georgian refugees were fleeing in large numbers from Sukhumi and the participants lost hope in their mission. They turned back on 24 September, arriving in Tbilisi, just three days before the Georgian troops in Abkhazia were defeated.

== Helsinki, Finland to Beijing, China (1995) ==
In 1994, the Women's International League for Peace and Freedom (WILPF) began organizing a women's peace train to take women to the United Nations' Fourth World Conference on Women to be held in Beijing, China. The planned route was to leave from Helsinki, Finland on 7 August 1995, and make stops in Saint Petersburg, Russia; Kyiv, Ukraine; Bucharest, Romania; Sofia, Bulgaria; Istanbul, Turkey; Odesa, Ukraine; Almaty, Kazakhstan; and Ürümqi, China, before reaching Beijing. At each stop rallies were planned to encourage peace and disarmament, protection of women and the environment, and discourage war and violence. The approximately $6000–$7000 cost of the trip was prohibitive for many women, and some sought sponsors to help them raise the money. Despite the costs, around 250 women and nine men, took part in the event. The women ranged in age from eighteen to eighty-six, and had representatives from 42 countries, including activists from every continent. The largest delegations were from Australia, Canada, Germany, Switzerland, and 110 activists from the United States. Not all of the representatives were members of WILPF, and their definitions of peace varied from inner peace to survival to a political concept. There were also two film crews, one from Germany and one from the US which filmed the trip. The train's sleeping cars had nine compartments each which slept between two and four people and on one end of the train, there was a medical compartment and two physicians. There were also three restaurants, two meeting cars, and each car had two toilets.

While they were traveling, the women attended workshops and seminars and had many informal gatherings on the train. They discussed current events like the resumption of nuclear testing by the French government in Polynesia and its impact on the health of Indigenous people and women and children, the effects on people and the environment from the Chernobyl disaster, the impact of the Bosnian War, and the ties between politico-economic stability and violence against women and a reduction of women's rights. Special workshops aboard the train were organized to discuss the topic of racism and how to build bridges between different ethnic groups. This was particularly important because WILPF had organized the train to build networks with Eastern European women and marginalized communities from the Global South, including participants from Angola, Guatemala, Sri Lanka, Sudan, the Philippines, and Vietnam. At the scheduled stops, the women stayed in local hotels, and met with dignitaries and representatives of local women's groups. The topics discussed at each stopover varied, as did the participants who took part in each presentation. In Saint Petersburg the planned seminar was on the impact the dissolution of the USSR had on women, and they spoke with Russian women about the war in Chechnya. In Kyiv the agenda topic was on disarmament and environmental issues, which was illustrated when they met with officials who told the activists that there was "not a plot of ground in Ukraine that [had] not been contaminated" by the Chernobyl accident. In Bucharest, the focus was on women and HIV; in Sofia, on the Yugoslav Wars and their impact on women and children; and in Turkey, on the development of the women's movement.

Considered to be radicals by some of the governments of the countries the women visited, passengers were surveilled and followed in Turkey, when their hosts took them to visit women's shelters and a women's library. The planned discussion in Odesa was about peacemakers and conflict and its focus on racism in the peace movement caused some of the activists discomfort. After the presentation, the Chinese government informed the women that they would not allow the planned stop in Ürümqi and that their entry into China was delayed by two days. To work around the new Chinese schedule, the women were routed to unplanned stops in Voronezh and Saratov, Russia, where they did sightseeing, before heading to Almaty. In Kazakhstan, the activists learned about the nuclear testing that had been done in the area during the Soviet era and the anti-nuclear movement that had begun in the country in 1989. When they finally changed trains to cross into China, a large uniformed security detail joined them and the cars were constantly patrolled. They made three brief stops, but at each stop barriers had been erected to prohibit the passengers from speaking to any Chinese person and the platforms were empty. Despite the two-day delay, the train arrived on the original date planned, 29 August. The women then were taken by bus to Workers' Stadium, where they were to take part in the NGO Forum for the UN conference. In 2015, women inspired by the 1995 Women's Peace Train traveled from Australia and New Zealand by land and sea, forgoing air travel to participate in the centennial celebration of the 1915 WILPF conference which resulted in the formation of the Women's International League for Peace and Freedom.

== Kampala, Uganda to Johannesburg, South Africa (2002) ==
At a planning meeting held in New York City by the Women's Environment and Development Organization in 2002, women worked on drafting an agenda to participate in the Earth Summit 2002. Mandisa Monakali stated that local women's groups had proposed a women's peace train and she proposed that Litha Musyimi-Ogana, the executive secretary of the African Center for Empowerment, Gender, and Advocacy organize it. The goal of the train was to build solidarity among women in Sub-Saharan Africa and raise awareness that without an end to war and violence against women and children, sustainable development was not possible. The women at the planning meeting also drafted a document to ensure that women's priorities were included in the agenda of the summit for the first time. Among those priorities were a commitment to gender equality in sustainable development projects and policies, equal access to resources needed for women's livelihoods, equal representation in governance, research into whether policies and programs met the needs of women and children, global commitment to 100 per cent literacy and protections for Indigenous knowledge, recognition that access to basic health services is a human right, and a commitment to peace with a focus on peace-building. Musyimi-Ogana returned to Kenya and began organizing the peace train, having agreed to spearhead its planning on condition that Monakali led the plans for the women's action tent at the summit. The plan included having three women delegates – representing the rural, NGO, and youth segments of the population – from each of the 53 nations in Africa. Also on board would be medical and media crews, as well as security personnel. At each border a peace torch would pass, ceremonies would be held in support of peace, and women would board the train to ride to the next border.

Women from Pro-Femmes Rwanda brought the peace torch donated by the United Nations Development Fund for Women to Kampala, Uganda, where the train left on 16 August. The train traveled east to Malaba, Kenya, stopping in Jinja, Iganga, and Tororo, Uganda, the final stop for the Ugandan delegation. At Malaba, Christine Debo, the Ugandan torch bearer, disembarked and passed the torch to Caroline Waluchio, the Kenyan torchbearer. The train then stopped briefly in Nakuru and Limuru, before arriving on the outskirts of Nairobi. At the Kibera station, a delegation of Sudanese refugees and Nubi women asked to share their stories and were invited to board the train as passengers. Over 2,000 people met the train as it arrived at the Nairobi platform to attend the ceremonies. Continuing through Taita–Taveta County, when the train reached the border between Taveta, Kenya and Holili, Tanzania it was discovered that the passengers had to be ferried by bus to Holili for the ceremonies because the town was not on the railway line. Mary Mbandi, who had received the torch in Nairobi passed on the torch to Asha Migiro, the Tanzanian Minister for Gender and Community Development. Because of a serious accident on the Dar-Es-Salaam-Morogoro line, which killed 200 people, the passengers had to travel by motorcade overnight to reach Dar es Salaam. There they boarded the TAZARA Railway's train to Kapiri Mposhi in Zambia. The train passed through Lusaka, but on the way to Livingstone, the train derailed because of a break in the track. Buses shuttled the passengers to Livingstone and National Railways of Zimbabwe agreed to pick up the passengers there to take them to Victoria Falls, Zimbabwe, for the handing-off ceremonies. At Livingstone, the Zambian torchbearer handed the torch off to the mayor of Livingstone, who in turn passed it to the Zimbabwean carrier at Victoria Falls.

Overnight the train traveled to Bulawayo, where Shuvai Mahofa, Deputy Minister for Gender and Community Affairs became the torch bearer. After the ceremonies, the train departed for Plumtree, where they switched trains to cross into Botswana, and the torch passed to a delegation representing the First Lady of Botswana Barbara Mogae. At Francistown, Botswana, Mogae joined the train and traveled to Gaborone. Even though it was 2 a.m. when the train arrived, a crowd and dignitaries were waiting at the station. After speeches and ceremonies, the train left enroute to Mafikeng, South Africa. The exhausted travelers took a day of rest at Mafikeng on 25 August and the arrival and torch passing ceremony there was hosted by First Lady of South Africa Zanele Mbeki. They arrived on schedule in Johannesburg on 26 August. After the welcoming ceremonies, the women met Monakali for the opening of the women's action tent. The outcome of the summit was to include women's empowerment and ensure Indigenous people's participation in the implementation and decision-making processes in order to reach the United Nations' developmental goals. A documentary film about the Women's Peace Train from Kampala to Johannesburg was released in 2004.

== Israel (2014–2017) ==
After the battles of the Miv'tza Tzuk Eitan (2014 Gaza War) began, attorney Irit Tamir began urging women to work for peace. She was joined by attorney Michal Barak, daughter of former president of the Supreme Court of Israel Aharon Barak; Saviona Rotlevy, retired judge of the Tel Aviv District Court; and Michal Shamir, head of the Art, Society and Culture School, at Sapir Academic College in forming the organization Women Wage Peace a month after the war began. On 25 November they sponsored a women's peace train from Nahariya, Israel near the Israeli-Lebanese border to protest on-going conflict in the region. One thousand women representing varying political and religious ideologies, with different ethnic backgrounds, joined together to press their governments to resolve their differences and bring peace to the region. They traveled to Sderot, near the border with Gaza, where they hosted a conference at Sapir College to urge the government and politicians to develop a peace plan which would integrate the principals of United Nations Security Council Resolution 1325 and involve women at all levels of the peace-making negotiations.

Continuing conflict in the region prompted Women Wage Peace to organize another women's peace train in 2017 from Tel Aviv to Beit She'an. Women were invited to begin the journey at the Savidor Station in Tel Aviv, or at any of the scheduled stops at the Binyamina, Haifa, Yokneam, or Afula railway stations. Alternatively, buses were scheduled from both Eilat and Kiryat Shmona picking up passengers along Highway 90. Around 1,000 women activists all wearing white, from throughout Israel rode the train to Beit She'an on 13 April. A few of the women were accompanied by their husbands. Arriving in the northern town, the women met with various officials including current mayor Michal Fruman, former mayor Rafi Ben Shitrit, and Knesset member Yehudah Glick. They took part in a demonstration calling for leaders to unite Jewish and Arab citizens, of all ages and religious or secular beliefs, to making permanent peace in the region. Recognizing that separations in society were caused by socio-economic and gendered divides, they pressed for the inclusion of women in establishing policies driving political and security for the country. Participants stressed that political ideologies and other differences should not impact politicians' ability to establish peace because the focus on security, tranquility, and protecting families equally impacted everyone. They pledged to support any politician who was committed to moving peace forward, and warned they would continue to protest until peace was established.
