= Valerie Nyirahabineza =

Rwandan politician (born 1969)

- Born: 1969 (age 55–56)
- Occupation(s): Civil servant, politician

Valerie Nyirahabineza (born 1969) is a Rwandan politician and civil servant. Since 2020, she has served as the chairperson of Rwanda Demobilisation and Reintegration Commission. She served two terms, from 2008 to 2017 in the East African Legislative Assembly as a Member of Parliament for Rwanda. Previous to her legislative terms, she was the Minister of Gender and Family Promotion for five years.

== Early life and education ==
Valerie Nyirahabineza was born in 1969.

== Career ==
=== Women's advocacy ===
In 2003, Nyirahabineza succeeded Marie Mukantabana as the Minister of Gender and Promotion of the Family. One of the issues she dealt with during her tenure were the approximately 7,000 street children who had been impacted by violence in the country and the death of parents in the HIV/AIDS crisis in Africa. According to Nyirahabineza, street children were particularly vulnerable to abuse and violence, poor health because of malnutrition, and infectious disease. She stressed the need for the government and service organisations to work together to alleviate poverty and support foster families to help care for children. When the government signed an agreement in 2004 with the Canadian International Development Agency for CA$ 3 million (FRw 1.03 billion) for developing a gender policy for Rwanda, Nyirahabineza stated that it would be earmarked to address the issues of women and children. As part of the policy advisory group on United Nations Security Council Resolution 1325, she met with other leaders like Scholastica Kimaryo (Tanzania), United Nations Development Programme Resident Representative to South Africa; Nomcebo Manzini (Eswatini) and Hodan Addou (Somalia) of UNIFEM; Litha Musyimi-Ogana (Kenya), gender and civil society advisor to the New Partnership for Africa's Development; Magdalene Madibela, head of the gender sector for the Southern African Development Community; Bernadette Lahai (Sierra Leone), member of parliament; and professor Pumla Gobodo-Madikizela (South Africa) in 2005 to discuss women's involvement in African peacemaking policies.

=== Regional politics (2008–2017) ===
Nyirahabineza was elected to serve a five-year term in the regional East African Legislative Assembly (EALA) in 2008. The nine members of the Rwandan delegation to the EALA included Nyirahabineza as women's representative, Odette Nyiramirimo as civil society representative, James Ndahiro as representative for people with disabilities, Straton Ndikuryera as youth representative, and the remaining members as representatives of political parties. Nyirahabineza was appointed to serve on the Committee on Legal Rules and Privileges. She supported the legislation passed in 2010 to create the East African Common Market Protocol. She pressed for a regional-level Gender Monitoring Office to be established in 2011, and worked to establish uniform election policies across the member states with the introduction of the Elections Bill 2011. The following year, introduced amendments to the Customs Management Act 2004 to establish protocols against transnational human trafficking and organised crime, as well as creating a regional customs body to implement trade policy. She urged other member states of the East African Community to implement the protocols necessary to facilitate regional integration so that citizens could benefit from the free movement of labour and services, as well as the economic reduction of tariffs and clear guidelines on imports and exports. Other legislation which passed in the term included integration of customs procedures and the university systems.

Nyirahabineza was elected to a second term in 2012 as the women's representative, defeating a challenge from Aquiline Niwemfura. She was re-assigned to the Committee on Legal Rules and Privileges. During the term, she supported legislation proposed to standardise electronic transactions, e-business policies, and internet safety protocols; the EAC Culture and Creative Industries Bill 2015, which aimed to simulate innovation and simultaneously provide intellectual property protections; and the final bill against human trafficking, which passed in 2016. Nyirahabineza also worked on the Disaster Risk Reduction and Management Control Bill 2014 and EAC Climate Change Bill 2015. She urged other lawmakers to recognise that while natural disasters like floods and drought significantly impact ecosystems and economies, solutions to protecting the environment and economy must include gender perspectives. As an example, she said that women predominantly work in farming and hold responsibility for producing, buying, selling and preparing food, but in the region owned "only two per cent of the land". She worked with lawmakers of EALA such as Christophe Bazivamo (Rwanda) and Daniel Kidega (Uganda), and Doreen Othero, the regional coordinator for integration of population, health, and the environment for the East African Community to develop a bill in 2017 which would regulate importation, manufacture, and sale of polythene bags throughout the region.

=== Civil service (2018–present) ===
After her second term in the EALA concluded, Nyirahabineza returned to school and earned a master's degree in gender and development from University of Rwanda in 2020. That year, she was appointed by the senate as chair of the Rwandan Demobilisation and Reintegration Commission. The commission provides basic support, medical care, and housing assistance to former combatants from the Rwandan genocide. Regular screenings are carried out to determine which of four categories for assistance an ex-combatant qualifies based on a medically determined disability rating. In addition, Nyirahabineza is responsible for overseeing the deradicalisation of former combatants, such as members of the Democratic Forces for the Liberation of Rwanda (FDLR), National Liberation Front (FLN), the Rwanda Movement for Democratic Change, and the Rwanda National Congress (RNC). Members of these dissident groups undergo civic and vocational training to enable them to reintegrate in civil society. After completion of a two-year rehabilitation program, the former combatants are given a certificate and discharged in hopes that they will become productive citizens and encourage other rebels to return home to Rwanda.
