= Olga Medvedkov =

Russian-American geography professor and peace activist

- Born: Olga Lvovna; 1949 (age 76–77)
- Other names: Olga L. Medvedkov, Olga Medvedkova, Olga Lvovna Medvedkova
- Occupations: Geographer, peace activist
- Years active: 1975-present
- Spouse: Yuri Vladimirovich Medvedkov
- Children: 2

Olga L. Medvedkov (Russian: Ольга Львовна Медведкова, Olga Lvovna Medvedkova, born May 1949) is a Russian-American geography professor and peace activist. In 1982, Medvedkov and her husband Yuri were among the founders of the Group to Establish Trust between the USSR and the USA (known as Trust-Builders). The organization hoped to develop a peaceful dialog between the superpowers during the Cold War. As it was independent from the official Soviet World Peace Council, group members were seen as dissidents and frequently followed and arrested by the police and the KGB. Despite Soviet suspicions of the Trust-Builders, the group gained support from Western anti-war activists. In the 1980s, various groups from Europe, Canada, and the US had their members meet with Medvedkov and her husband. On December 7, 1983, three members of the Trust Group between the USSR and the USA were arrested in Moscow: Olga Medvedkova, 33, an employee of the USSR Academy of Sciences, a candidate of geographical sciences; Valery Godyak, 41, a candidate of physical sciences, a member of the European Physical Society and the American Academy of Sciences, who was dismissed two years ago with the sanction of the Soviet authorities from his teaching job at Moscow University, and Olga Lusnikova, 27, an economist. The Trust Group members were accused of “disobeying the authorities”. They were detained by police officers outside the courthouse where the case of the previously arrested Trust Group member Oleg Radzinsky was being heard. Medvedkova, Godyak, and Lusnikova were accused of beating a police officer, although, in fact, they themselves were beaten at the police station after their arrest. International pressure and media campaigns called for her release. Although she was convicted, Medvedkov's sentence was suspended. She, her husband, and her children and parents were granted visas to emigrate in 1986. Relocating to Ohio, she became a professor of geography and director of the Russian studies program at Wittenberg University in Springfield, Ohio.

== Early life and education ==
Olga Lvovna was born in May 1949. She earned a bachelor's degree and master's degree from Moscow State University. In 1975, she completed her Candidate of Sciences at the Institute of Geography of the Russian Academy of Sciences. Around the same time, she married Yuri Medvedkov, a senior researcher at the Institute of Geography, who had previously headed the Ecology Laboratory for the World Health Organization in Geneva, Switzerland. Yuri was a widower, whose first wife had died in 1972, the year that he had returned to the Soviet Union to attend a geographic conference and was prevented from returning to his post in Geneva. The couple had a son, Mikhail, known as Mike, around 1976 and a daughter, Masha, known as Mary in 1984.

== Russian career and activism (1976–1986) ==
In 1976, Medvedkov was hired as a junior researcher at the Institute of Geography. Before a travel ban was imposed, Yuri had traveled the world to participate in international conferences. In 1980, he was hopeful that he would be able to take part in a conference to be held in Poland. The Soviet authorities initially gave him permission to go, but two days before the conference, he was told that travel would not be allowed. Frustrated with the inability to collaborate with fellow scholars outside of Russia, in February 1981 the Medvedkovs filed paperwork requesting that they be allowed to permanently settle abroad. The repercussions were immediate. Authorities attempted to strip them of their academic degrees, demoted Yuri to a junior researcher post, and changed Olga's status to that of a temporary employee. Their passports were revoked, many of their friends stopped associating with them, and they were often followed by KGB officers.

The Medvedkovs were among the founders of the Group to Establish Trust between the USSR and the USA, which was organized in June 1982. The Trust-Builders, as the group members called themselves, were independent of the government and World Peace Council. They advocated for "détente from below", believing that peace was more likely to occur through a mass movement than from government actions. They advocated an end to stockpiles and a ban on further development of nuclear weapons, and called for a joint Soviet-American commission to be established to work towards bettering trust and relations between the two countries. That summer, a group of Scandinavian women, taking part in Peace March '82 boarded the Women's Peace Train in Stockholm, Sweden and made their way to Leningrad, to take part in rallies throughout Russia held to protest the arms race. Although the Scandinavians' activities were carefully controlled and their contact with Soviet citizens was limited, some members of the group, including Danielle Grünberg, national coordinator of the British Women's Peace Alliance, Cees van der Vel, a Dutch journalist; and Jean Stead, a reporter for The Guardian, were allowed to meet with the Medvedkovs. The couple hosted an exhibit of the works of the artist Sergei Batovrin, in honor of the victims of the Hiroshima bombing in August at their home. The KGB raided the event and confiscated the paintings. In October the couple took part in a public appeal proposing that on 1 January 1983 people should gather to hold a silent vigil at 15:00 GMT to support peace and cooperation among nations.

The Soviet government viewed the group's actions as a call for human rights, and warned that group members Would be criminally prosecuted as anti-Soviet provocateurs if they continued to meet. Trust-Builders members began to be surveilled and arrested, but their ties to Western peace organizations curtailed authorities from arresting and exiling the entire group. The Medvedkov's telephone service was terminated and their tires were slashed, while other members of the group were drafted, jailed, or confined to a mental institution. Yuri was arrested for hooliganism, allegedly for "pushing an old lady" on the metro and sentenced to fifteen days detention. Eastern activists, who were part of the independent anti-nuclear movement applied for visas to meet with the Medvedkovs in April 1983. Their applications were denied, and Georgy Zhukov, the Soviet Minister of Defense, notified them that there was "no so-called independent peace movement" in the USSR and stated that Olga Medvedkov, "a Jew by nationality, and her family were simply looking for an excuse to move to Israel". In May, two Welsh anti-war activists, Karmen Cutler and Ann Pettitt, and a collaborator, Jean McCollister from Seattle, Washington, went to the Soviet Union as delegates from Greenham Common Women's Peace Camp to meet with members of the Soviet Peace Committee. The Soviets intended to film the meeting with the activists, to use as propaganda of international support for their peace strategy. When the Greenham delegates arrived, they brought Medvedkov with them. She was briefly allowed to speak, which angered the vice chair of the Soviet Peace Committee, who declared her to be a criminal. Medvedkov voluntarily left the meeting after the outburst.

On 13 October 1983, Medvedkov attempted to attend the trial of a Trust member, Oleg Radzinsky, but was detained by police with other members of the group. After several hours they were released, but Medvedkov refused to accept a ride offered by the police to take her to the metro. Witnesses reported, she, pregnant at the time, was then "picked up by her hands and feet and thrown… against a wall…several times". During these events she grabbed a door handle and it detached from the door. In November, the Medvedkovs and other members of the Trust-Builders met with Canadian delegates to the Vienna Dialogues, the second International Conference Dialogue for Disarmament and Detente, who were invited by the Soviet Peace Committee to meet with their members prior to the conference. Two weeks after their visit, Medvedkov was arrested and charged with assaulting police officers during her October detention. Her arrest sparked widespread protests from activists in the West. A trial was scheduled for December and members of the Trust-Builders were threatened they would be charged with perjury if they supported Medvedkov's version of how the events unfolded. The trial was postponed until February, and then delayed a second time because of her lawyer's illness. Medvedkov expected to be sentenced to a three-year term in a Siberian labor camp. She was convicted in March 1984 and in light of her pregnancy was given a suspended sentence of two and a half years.

When members of the Greenham Common Women's Peace Camp attempted to visit the couple in June 1985, they were barred from the Medvedkov's apartment by police and advised that no visit would be allowed. The Medvedkov's apartment became a destination for tourists and during the 12th World Festival of Youth and Students in the summer of 1985, more than 100 delegates took the metro to visit their flat. That year, the Trust-Builders organized street protests regarding the Soviet–Afghan War. In January 1986, when British politician Joan Ruddock attempted to visit the Medvedkovs with a group of activists from the Campaign for Nuclear Disarmament, they found the couple under house arrest. Although they were not allowed to enter the apartment, the KGB detail guarding it left at 10 P.M., and they and members of the Trust began gathering there. After the Chernobyl disaster, Medvedkov distributed leaflets to warn people of safety measures because the government had not even told "people what was and was not safe to eat".

In June 1986, both Medvedkovs were fired from their employment at the Academy of Science. When they protested publicly, the police detained them, and then fined Medvedkov $40 and imprisoned Yuri for ten days. Yuri was arrested at the 1986 Goodwill Games in Moscow and again charged with hooliganism. After serving a brief jailing, on 14 September, the couple were given an exit visa and told to leave the USSR within two days. They were surprised by the approval because they had never reapplied after their 1981 visa request was denied, but Medvedkov said that she felt it was a way for the Soviets to build trust with the West prior to a planned meeting in October between US President Ronald Reagan and Soviet leader Mikhail Gorbachev. The couple, along with their children and Medvedkov's parents, arrived in Vienna ten days later with plans to visit peace activists in the Netherlands, Belgium, France, and the UK before making their way to Columbus, Ohio, where Yuri had been offered a position at Ohio State University.

== Academics (1988–present) ==
Medvedkov initially worked as a senior researcher at Ohio State. By 1988, she was hired as a geography professor at the Wittenberg University in Springfield, Ohio. Wittenberg developed a Russian Area Studies Program, which included a US-Russian exchange program for undergraduates. From the early 1990s, Medvedkov served as program director, and brought Russian professors to speak at Wittenberg. Her published works often centered on the changing dynamics of East-West relations and the social changes in post-Soviet Russia. During her tenure, Medvedkov worked with students and community leaders to develop interactive studies. In 1996, she joined with business management professor Pam Schindler to design a program to help local businesses analyze their customer bases to better target their services. As part of the program, in 1998 students analyzed emergency services dispatches to determine if adequate medical and fire response was available in the city. The study determined that there was inadequate coverage for southern Springfield. The students recommended that an additional fire house would reduce strain on the two existing fire stations in the south and that another medical unit was needed in the north. Medvedkov was honored with the university's distinguished teaching award in 2010.

== Selected works ==
- Medvedkov, Olga L. (September 1988). "Soviet Cities and Their Industrial-Social Performance". Urban Geography. 9 (5). New York, New York: Taylor & Francis: 487–517. doi:10.2747/0272-3638.9.5.487. ISSN 0272-3638. OCLC 4645903541.
- Medvedkov, Olga L.; Medvedkov, Yuri V. (1990). Disadvantaged Groups and Backward Regions in the Soviet Union. Washington, DC: National Council for Soviet and East European Research. OCLC 25206162.
- Medvedkov, Olga (1990). Soviet Urbanization. London, UK: Routledge. ISBN 978-0-415-03869-0.
- Medvedkov, Olga L. (April 1991). "Geography of Well-Being in the Soviet Union: An Automated Data Base Approach". Tijdschrift voor economische en sociale geografie. 82 (2). Amsterdam, Netherlands: Wiley-Blackwell for the Royal Dutch Geographical Society: 82–93. doi:10.1111/j.1467-9663.1991.tb01799.x. ISSN 0040-747X. OCLC 5157194009.
- Ioffe, Gregory; Medvedkov, Olga L.; Medvedkov, Yuri; Nefordova, Tatiana; Vlasova, Natalia (2001). "Russia's Fragmented Space". In Ruble, Blair A.; Koehn, Jodi; Popson, Nancy E. (eds.). Fragmented Space in the Russian Federation. Washington, D.C.: Woodrow Wilson Center Press. pp. 31–57. ISBN 978-0-8018-6570-1.
- Medvedkov, Olga; Medvedkov, Yuri (2005). "14: Moscow in Transition". In Hamilton, F. E. Ian; Andrews, Kaliopa Dimitrovska; Pichler-Milanović, Nataša (eds.). Transformation of Cities in Central and Eastern Europe: Towards Globalization. New York, New York: United Nations University Press. pp. 428–464. ISBN 978-92-808-1105-6.
- Medvedkov, Olga; Salukvadze, Joseph (January 2016). "Altered Urban Landscapes: European Cities In Transition". Geografiska Annaler. Stockholm, Sweden: Swedish Society for Anthropology and Geography: 287–379. doi:10.1111/geob.12104. ISSN 1468-0467. OCLC 971500126.
- Medvedkov, Yuri; Medvedkov, Olga (2018). "10: Turning Points and Trends in Russia's Urbanization". In Demko, George J. (ed.). Population Under Duress: Geodemography of Post-Soviet Russia (ebook ed.). New York, New York: Routledge. doi:10.4324/9780429503528. ISBN 978-0-429-50352-8.
