= Litha Musyimi-Ogana =

Kenyan civil servant and development advisor (born 1959)

- Born: Litha Musyimi; 1959 (age 66–67); Embu County, Kenya
- Education: University of Nairobi
- Children: 3
- Relatives: Mutava Musyimi (sibling)

Litha Musyimi-Ogana (born 1959) is a Kenyan, who has worked as an international civil servant and development advisor for many years. Since 2022, she has been an elected member of the African Commission on Human and Peoples' Rights, chairing the committees responsible for Indigenous people and people living with HIV. She organised the Women's Peace Train, which traveled from Kampala, Uganda to Johannesburg, South Africa to advocate for ending conflict and bringing stability for women and children in Africa for the Earth Summit 2002. From 2007 to 2015, she was the director of the African Union Commission's department of Women, Gender and Development. In 2013, she was recognised by Malawian President Joyce Banda as one of the distinguished women of Africa in a ceremony which was part of the decennial celebrations of the African Union's Maputo Protocol and in 2020 she was honoured with the African Women of Excellence Award by the African Union's Diaspora African Forum.

== Early life and education ==
Litha Musyimi was born in 1959, in Riakanau village, Embu County, Kenya to Tabitha and Stephen Musyimi Kisilu. Her father was a village elder and one of the leaders of the Mwea parish of the Anglican Mutira Mission. There were eight siblings in the family: David, Kim, Mutava, John, Rahab, Zippy, Isabella, and Litha. Musyimi earned a bachelor's degree and master's degree in economics from the University of Nairobi. She later married and had three children: Janet, Silava, and Victor.

== Career ==
Musyimi-Ogana began her career in 1983, working as an advisor to the Kenyan Ministry of Finance. She later transferred to the National Council on Population and Development, a department in the Office of the Vice President and Ministry of Home Affairs, before ending her government service in 1993. In 1988, she and Mary Kairu founded the NGO, Family Life Promotion and Services (FLPS), with the goal of providing family planning services and reproductive health screenings to commercial sex workers. When she left government service, Musyimi-Ogana became the executive director of FLPS and as its representative attended preparatory meetings in 1993 and 1994 hosted by the United Nations for the International Conference on Population and Development, held in Cairo, Egypt in 1994. She was assisted by Jane Kirui, Louisa Owiti, and Margaret Thuo in coordinating the responses of various NGOs and the Kenyan government to insure that the global discussion of population challenges included issues impacting women and children. As the shift was made in recognising the HIV/AIDS crisis in Africa as a development issue, Musyimi-Ogana led FLPS to expand by offering HIV/AIDS education services and a condom distribution service. Speaking about the crisis, she stated that the AIDS pandemic had created thousands of orphans, leaving many children living on the street and subject to exploitation. She commented that the age of the prostitutes her agency helped was steadily becoming younger. In 1997, she became the executive secretary of the African Center for Empowerment, Gender, and Advocacy (ACEGA).

In 2002, while working at the Women's Environment and Development Organization in New York City on assignment from ACEGA, Musyimi-Ogana attended a planning meeting on the women's response for the Earth Summit 2002. Mandisa Monakali presented ideas from local women's groups, which included a Women's Peace Train and proposed that Musyimi-Ogana should organise it. The goal of the train was to build solidarity among women in Sub-Saharan Africa and raise awareness to the issues that war and violence caused for women and children. The women at the planning meeting also drafted a document to ensure that women's priorities were included in the agenda of the summit for the first time. Among those priorities were a commitment to gender equality in sustainable development projects and policies, equal access to resources needed for women's livelihoods, equal representation in governance, research into whether policies and programmes met the needs of women and children, global commitment to 100 per cent literacy and protections for Indigenous knowledge, recognition that access to basic health services is a human right, and a commitment to peace with a focus on peace-building. Musyimi-Ogana returned to Kenya, where she became the regional director of the African Center for Empowerment, Gender, and Advocacy and lead organiser of the peace train. Women from Rwanda brought the peace torch to Kampala, Uganda, where the train left on 16 August. It made stops in Kenya, Tanzania, Malawi, Mozambique, Zimbabwe, Zambia, and Botswana before arriving in Johannesburg, South Africa on 25 August. Musyimi-Ogana rode the train with her youngest child. The outcome of the summit was to include women's empowerment and ensure Indigenous people's participation in the implementation and decision-making processes in order to reach the United Nations' developmental goals.

In 2004, the New Partnership for Africa's Development (NEPAD) created the office of Gender and Civil Society Organisations. They hired Musyimi-Ogana, as director, and charged her with evaluating the NEPAD Programme for Action and making recommendations to specifically ensure that the plan included a focus on achieving gender equality, which it had not contained previously. As part of the policy advisory group on United Nations Security Council Resolution 1325, she met with other leaders like Scholastica Kimaryo (Tanzania), United Nations Development Programme Resident Representative to South Africa; Nomcebo Manzini (Eswatini) of UNIFEM; Hodan Addou (Somalia), UNIFEM's Regional Peace and Security Adviser for East, Central and Southern Africa; Valerie Nyirahabineza, Rwandan Minister of Gender and Promotion of the Family; Magdalene Madibela, head of the gender sector for the Southern African Development Community; Bernadette Lahai (Sierra Leone), member of parliament; and professor Pumla Gobodo-Madikizela (South Africa) in 2005 to discuss women's involvement in African peacemaking policies. Musyimi-Ogana became the director of the African Union Commission's department of Women, Gender and Development in 2007. Her post required oversight and coordination of the gender policies of the 53 member-states of the African Union to ensure compliance with the requirements of the Maputo Protocol and Solemn Declaration of Gender Equality in Africa, as well as international treaty obligations such as the Convention on the Elimination of All Forms of Discrimination Against Women.

Musyimi-Ogana oversaw the launch in October 2010 of the African Women's Decade, an initiative aimed at prioritising "women's economic empowerment; increased access to agricultural land, farm inputs, credit, technology, market and water access to achieve food security; improved women's health to reduce maternal mortality and address HIV/AIDS; as well as parity in education at all levels and in political and electoral processes". Among the outcomes during the period, Malawian President Joyce Banda and Liberian President Ellen Johnson Sirleaf joined forces to back the African Women's Decade and press other leaders to accelerate their efforts towards achieving women's equality. Musyimi-Ogana pledged the support of people and resources to assist them. Along with businesswoman Folorunso Alakija (Nigeria), political activist Asha Haji Elmi (Somalia), and Chief Justice Anastasia Msosa (Malawi), Musyimi-Ogana was honoured with the Distinguished Women of Africa Award by Banda in 2013, as part of the decennial celebrations of the African Union's Maputo Protocol. In 2015, she completed her PhD at the University of the Witwatersrand, School of Governance, and published her book, True Story of Women Peace Train from Kampala to Johannesburg. The book was launched by Kenyan First Lady Margaret Kenyatta. It told the story of the 2002 African Women's Peace Train to combat violence against women and promote peace. Musyimi-Ogana became the Director of the African Union Office of the African Peer Review Mechanism in 2016, and the following year, was made a special adviser to the President of the African Union. She was honoured by the African Union's Diaspora African Forum with the African Women of Excellence Award in 2020 and in 2022 became a member of the African Commission on Human and Peoples' Rights and chair of two committees dealing with Indigenous rights and people living with or vulnerable to HIV/AIDS.

== Selected works ==
- Musyimi-Ogana, Litha (January 1994). "Empowerment of Women as Equal Partners in the Family". Wajibu. 9 (4). Nairobi, Kenya: Gerald J. Wanjohi: 5–7. ISSN 1016-9717. OCLC 7211643707.
- Musyimi-Ogana, Litha (2000). A Pocket Handbook on Advocacy, Gender and Monitoring for Women Leaders. Nairobi, Kenya: African Center for Empowerment Gender and Advocacy. OCLC 1050059987.
- Musyimi-Ogana, Litha (2000). Réinforcement des pouvoirs des femmes par la participation égal au processus décisionnel: manuel de formation en matière de plaidoyer et de lobby pour les femmes leaders d'Afrique de l'ouest [Reinforcement of Women's Power by Equal Participation in the Decision-Making Process: Training Manual in Matters of Advocacy and Lobbying for Women Leaders in West Africa] (in French). Nairobi, Kenya: African Center for Empowerment Gender and Advocacy. OCLC 67775947.
- Musyimi-Ogana, Litha (2015). True Story of Women Peace Train: From Kampala to Johannesburg. Bloomington, Indiana: AuthorHouse. ISBN 978-1-5049-3839-6.
- Kithatu-Kiwekete, A.K.; Musyimi Ogana, Litha (September 2016). "Administering the Gender Agenda". Administratio Publica. 24 (3). Stellenbosch, South Africa: Association of Southern African Schools and Departments of Public Administration and Management: 199–218. hdl:10520/ejc-adminpub-v24-n3-a11. ISSN 1015-4833. OCLC 9686485613.
- Musyimi-Ogana, Litha (2023). Aid Evaporation: Dynamics of Supply Side Forces in Overseas Development Assistance (ODA); Confronting the Global Aid Governance Architecture from a Pan-African Perspective. Bloomington, Indiana: AuthorHouse. ISBN 979-8-8230-8238-9.
