= Doreen Othero =

Kenyan nurse and research and policy analyst

- Born: 5 October 1962 (age 64)
- Education: Kenya Medical Training College, University of Eastern Africa - Baraton, Free University of the Great Lakes Countries (ULPGL), Kenyatta University
- Occupations: Registered Nurse, Research and Policy Analyst, Senior Lecturer, Public Health Specialist
- Years active: 1990–present
- Spouse: Fanuel O. Othero (m.1987- died. 2012)
- Children: 1

Doreen Alice Maloba Othero (born 5 October 1962) is a public health specialist, a registered nurse, academic, and research and policy analyst in Kenya. She specialises in interdisciplinary solutions to development to ensure that the interrelated needs of the population and their health are incorporated into environmental conservation projects and policies. She is a senior lecturer at Maseno University and has been involved with the Lake Victoria Basin Commission of the East African Community conducting research and advising on policy since 2008. Her work has focused on HIV/AIDS control and management and sustainable economic and environmental development. Since 2014, she has been the regional coordinator for integration of population, health, and the environment for the East African Community.

== Early life and education ==
Maloba attended Murende Primary School, near Nambale in Busia County from 1967 until 1974. She completed her O-level exams at Nangina Girls High School in Funyula town, before completing her A-level qualification at Butere Girls High School in 1980. She obtained her registered nursing certification from Kenya Medical Training College in 1986 and went on to complete her certification as a midwife at Mater Misericordiae Hospital in Nairobi in 1992. After completing her Bachelor of Science degree in nursing at the University of Eastern Africa, Baraton in 1999, she earned a master's degree from Free University of the Great Lakes Countries (ULPGL) in the Democratic Republic of the Congo in health management in 2001, and completed her PhD in public health at Kenyatta University in 2006.

== Family ==
In 1987, Doreen married Dr. Fanuel O. Othero, an ophthalmologist and eye surgeon known for his contributions to eye health, who died in 2012. They had children. Among their children is Kevin O. Othero, a Kenyan corporate and commercial lawyer and Senior Partner at AKO Advocates LLP, where he heads the Corporate and Commercial Law Department.

== Career ==
Othero began researching HIV/AIDS and prevention programmes for the African Medical and Research Foundation in refugee camps in Ethiopia and Eritrea in 2002. The following year, she was hired as an assistant lecturer in public health at Maseno University, and worked her way up to hold the post of senior lecturer and programme coordinator for the university's School of Public Health and Community Development by 2018. From 2004, she was coordinating Maseno University's response to the HIV/AIDs crisis in Africa, which included preparing a baseline study, distribution of medication and condoms, and training for educators, care providers, and policy makers, on transmission and availability of support systems. Othero became a project manager for the East African Community's Lake Victoria Basin Commission (LVBC) in 2008 and was responsible for overseeing research conducted at eighteen universities in Kenya, Tanzania, and Uganda to evaluate students' HIV/AIDS status. The purpose of the survey was to establish a baseline for evaluating the severity of HIV infections on the campuses to formulate an effective health management policy. She became the technical specialist on HIV/AIDS for the LVBC in 2009. She led a baseline study of the various mobile populations including commercial traders, fishers, migrant farm workers, security personnel, sex workers, and truck drivers who used the lake basin to evaluate patterns of the spread of HIV/AIDS and the status of the migratory population. Findings of the research confirmed that the rate of infection for people living along the lake was particularly high and was driven by interaction of transient workers with commercial sex workers and cultural norms, such as widow inheritance.

In 2014, Othero became the regional coordinator for integration of population, health, and the environment (PHE) in the East African Community. Her work was aimed towards developing a interdisciplinary approach to solving the four major issues in the lake basin, namely environmental damage and stress, population density, varied use needs, and overlapping of development projects. By drawing upon the expertise of government agencies, civil society, media outlets, non-governmental organisations, and academia, the goal was to create strategic plan for sustainable development with monitoring and evaluation controls to form best practices for using resources and protecting the well-being of the population in East Africa. She travelled to the member states of the East African Community to establish PHE networks. She also spoke at international events. During a presentation at the Woodrow Wilson International Center for Scholars in 2014, Othero and Deepa Pullanikkatil, a sustainability and environmental manager who has researched lake basins in Malawi, argued in favor of development efforts which coordinate health and economic initiatives with environmental conservation projects. They stressed that goals to protect resources often failed because of a lack of attention to the impact programmes had on the livelihoods and well-being of the communities concerned. Her presentation at the 2017 African Great Lakes Conference organised by The Nature Conservancy and held in Entebbe, Uganda was called "riveting" by colleagues attending the gathering. Suzanne York, director of Transition Earth, stated that as a leading PHE expert, Othero was able to link child and maternal health, family planning, and disease prevention to conservation efforts by pointing out that population dynamics were often critical to successful conservation efforts.

Othero worked with lawmakers of the East African Legislative Assembly such as Christophe Bazivamo and Valerie Nyirahabineza (Rwanda) and Daniel Kidega (Uganda) to develop a bill in 2017 which would regulate importation, manufacture, and sale of polythene bags throughout the region. Concerned with illegal logging, deforestation, and farming instability, Othero urged that the region adopt farming innovations. For example, in western Kenya near Mount Elgon, the population has depended on maize as a staple for the diet. To cultivate the plant, vast fields were cleared, leading to deforestation. To combat the environmental issue, but provide both a continuity of livelihood and well-being for the population, Othero and other members of the commission introduced other cash crops, like sugarcane and potatoes, to local farmers. They have helped farmers transition to raising kitchen gardens for household use and replanting trees. In addition, dairy cattle, have been introduced. These cows are fed by zero grazing methods, which reduce the impact of overgrazing by stall feeding them fodder. Beekeeping was also introduced in the area around Mount Elgon and Mount Kenya as a less environmentally harmful and more lucrative source of income. According to Othero, raising bees is "one of the best ways the community can use to improve their livelihoods and conserve the forest". Beekeeping is also less labour intensive than growing maize, allows farmers to use traditional wood and dung hives which are inexpensive to make, and typically offers a more stable income source.

Othero currently is a distinguished public health professional currently serving as a Senior Lecturer at Maseno University's School of Public Health, where she holds the position of Chair of the Department.

== Selected works ==
- Othero, Doreen M.; Orago, Alloys S.S.; Groenewegen, Ted; Kaseje, Dan O.; Otengah, P. A. (December 2008). "Home Management of Diarrhea among Underfives in a Rural Community in Kenya: Household Perceptions and Practices". East African Journal of Public Health. 5 (3). Dar es Salaam, Tanzania: East African Public Health Association: 142–146. ISSN 0856-8960. OCLC 1359406330.
- Othero, D. M.; Aduma, P.; Opil, C. O. (January 2009). "Knowledge, Attitudes and Sexual Practices of University Students for Advancing Peer HIV Education". East African Medical Journal. 86 (1). Nairobi, Kenya: Kenya Medical Association: 11–15. doi:10.4314/eamj.v86i1.46922. ISSN 0012-835X. OCLC 402725116.
- Okurut, Tom O.; Othero, Doreen M. (2012). "16. A Holistic Approach to Natural Resource Management: A Case of Lake Victoria Basin". In Grover, Velma I.; Krantzberg, Gail (eds.). Great Lakes: Lessons in Participatory Governance. Boca Raton, Florida: CRC Press. pp. 349–363. ISBN 978-1-57808-769-3.
- Ofulla, Ayub Victor Opiyo; Gichere, Samuel Kerunyu; Olado, Geoffrey Oduasi; Abuom, Paul Otieno; Anyona, Douglas Nyambane; Othero, Doreen Maloba (July 2016). "Effects of Regional Climate Variability on the Prevalence of Diseases and Their Economic Impacts on Households in the Lake Victoria Basin of Western Kenya". International Journal of Global Warming. 10 (1–3). Geneva, Switzerland: Inderscience Enterprises: 332–353. doi:10.1504/IJGW.2016.077899. ISSN 1758-2091. OCLC 7035013974.
- Odero, Christopher Ochieng'; Othero, Doreen Alice Maloba; Were, Vincent Omondi; Ouma, Collins (February 2024). "Trends of Non-Vaccination, Under-Vaccination and Missed Opportunities for Vaccination (2003–2014) Amongst Children 0–23 Months in Kenya". PLOS Global Public Health. 4 (2) e0002906. San Francisco, California: Public Library of Science. doi:10.1371/journal.pgph.0002906. ISSN 2767-3375. OCLC 10146270069. PMC 10846728. PMID 38319922.
