= Hodan Addou =

Somali international civil servant

World Bank
- Incumbent
- Assumed office 1990

UN Women's Country Representative in Tanzania
- Incumbent
- Assumed office 2017

United Nations Development Fund for Women (UNIFEM)
- In office 1992–1994

Personal details
- Occupation: Somali scholar

Hodan Addou is a Somali international civil servant who has been engaged with the United Nations Development Fund for Women (UNIFEM) and its successor, UN Women in developing policies for women and women's empowerment since 1992. She has been a programme officer in Kenya; gender and conflict advisor in Burundi; the Regional Peace and Security Adviser for East, Central and Southern Africa; and Country Programme Director in Sudan, Zimbabwe, and Uganda. She is presently the Country Representative for UN Women in Tanzania.

== Career ==
Hodan Addou, a scholar from Somalia, began working with the World Bank in 1990, assisting Manuel Zymelman in preparing a report on science and technology preparedness in secondary schools in Sub-Saharan Africa. She worked as a United Nations Development Fund for Women (UNIFEM) programme officer for building women's capacity at the African Academy of Sciences between 1992 and 1994, evaluating women's issues in attaining access to higher education. She continued her work the following year, evaluating links between education levels and agricultural productivity. Working on a joint project between UNIFEM and the African Women in Crisis Programme (AFWIC) in 1996, Addou and Jacqueline Oduol, along with officials from the Organisation of African Unity and the office of the United Nations High Commissioner for Refugees studied security problems and legal status issues for women who were refugees or who had been displaced within their own countries because of violence or conflict. Addou then became the UNIFEM Regional Peace Project Officer for the African Women's Studies Programme, based in Nairobi. In that capacity, she commissioned a book, Somalia between Peace and War: Somali Women on the Eve of the 21st Century in 1998, which looked at the roles women played in both peace building and conflict resolution during the Somali Civil War. While Addou was serving as the gender and conflict advisor in Burundi, women tried to convince African leaders like South African President Nelson Mandela and Burundian President Pierre Buyoya to support the inclusion of women in the negotiations of the Arusha Accords, which ended the civil war. The African leaders refused to allow women to participate, but granted them observer status. Unsatisfied with that outcome, in 2000 Addou unsuccessfully tried to convince members within the UN system to support women's full participation.

By 2005, Addou was UNIFEM's Regional Peace and Security Adviser for East, Central and Southern Africa. As part of the policy advisory group on United Nations Security Council Resolution 1325, she met with other leaders like Scholastica Kimaryo (Tanzania), United Nations Development Programme Resident Representative to South Africa; Nomcebo Manzini (Eswatini) of UNIFEM; Litha Musyimi-Ogana (Kenya), gender and civil society advisor to the New Partnership for Africa's Development; Valerie Nyirahabineza, Rwandan Minister of Gender and Promotion of the Family; Magdalene Madibela, head of the gender sector for the Southern African Development Community; Bernadette Lahai (Sierra Leone), member of parliament; and professor Pumla Gobodo-Madikizela (South Africa) in 2005 to discuss women's involvement in African peacemaking policies. Over the next several years, Addou became the UNIFEM Country Programme Director in Sudan (2009–2010) working to train women to run as candidates and participate in politics and policy making; in Zimbabwe (2011–2013) to advocate and lobby for themselves and their needs in the drafting of a new constitution; and in Uganda (2013–2016) to educate women about implementation of the new policies against gender-based violence. She also stressed the need for the legislature to enact laws that would promote women's civic participation, prevent child marriages, allow them to institute divorce proceedings, and give them an equal ability to own land and property. In 2016, Addou commissioned The Gender Bench Book, a guide to assist the judiciary in understanding the discriminatory laws and customs which make it difficult for women to access justice, and in improving their practices in dispensing equitable rulings.

Addou became the UN Women's Country Representative in Tanzania in 2017. She took over management of an existing programme jointly operating with UN Women and Amref Health Africa to educate women and girls about female genital mutilation, child marriage, and family violence. As country representative, she is also responsible for overseeing the women's centres in various refugee camps that house families who have fled from conflicts and violence in Burundi and the Democratic Republic of Congo. The women's centres in the Mtendeli, Nduta, and Nyarugusu Refugee Camps provides counselling services, networking opportunities and entrepreneurship and small business training for women. The centres also offer training for men aimed at reducing gender stereotypes for the good of the family. The 16-week programme for men teaches them the benefits of having dual incomes and how to care for children and the household, so that their wives can help with the economic needs of the family. In 2021, Addou, along with the Tanzania Women Judges Association, published the Gender Bench Book On Women's Rights to strengthen the ability of the courts to manage women's rights and gender based violence cases.
