= Danielle Grünberg =

British theatre director and activist

- Grünberg in 1985
- Born: Danielle Rose Grünberg; 20 September 1940; London, UK
- Died: 16 August 2019 (aged 78); Nyons, France
- Other names: Danielle Grunberg, Danielle Gruenberg
- Occupation(s): Actress, theater director, and activist
- Years active: 1969-2019
- Known for: Stop Hinkley Expansion Campaign
- Mother: Rita Kernn-Larsen

Danielle Grünberg (20 September 1940 – 16 August 2019) was a British theatre actress and director, and an activist who participated in the anti-war and anti-nuclear activities and transitioned into the environmental and climate movements. She was one of the founders of the Stop Hinkley Expansion Campaign (SHE), which successfully fought to curtail Britain's nuclear power programme in the 1990s. While in Scotland in 1995, Grünberg became part of the transition town campaign, which she supported after moving to France in 2011. She continued to speak about the environment and climate change until June 2019, two months prior to her death.

== Early life and education ==
Danielle Rose Grünberg was born on 20 September 1940, in London to Rita Kernn-Larsen and Isaac Grünberg. Her mother was a noted Danish Surrealist painter and her father an Austrian-Jewish art dealer. The couple travelled from Denmark in 1938 to participate in an exhibition hosted by Peggy Guggenheim for the opening of her Guggenheim Jeune Gallery. The outbreak of World War II caused them to remain in London, where their daughter was born. At the end of the war, the family moved to Saint Jeannet in the south of France. In the 1960s, Grünberg returned to the UK and graduated from the Drama Centre London.

== Career ==
=== Acting (1969–1984) ===
After graduating, Grünberg and Brian Ayres, a classmate from the Drama Centre, formed a theatrical troupe and performed "Three Plays for Fun and Laughter" in 1969 at the Arts Laboratory on Drury Lane in London. They presented the programme that autumn at the Traverse Theatre in Edinburgh, Scotland. They called their troupe "The Vagrants", advertised themselves as a "professional fringe theatre group", with Grünberg as manager. In 1971, they toured "The Knickers" in London and the Midlands. Over the next few years, she and Ayres worked together in Dorset, performing mostly in infant and primary schools and pensioners' homes and touring in Denmark and France. In 1975, they formed the Somerset Theatre and Arts Cooperative, one of the only professional theatre groups in the county at the time. Based in Bridgwater, their travelling presentations typically featured acting out nursery rhymes, legends, and folklore with the help of puppets, followed by an improvisational segment, which allowed children to perform their own stories. They renamed their mobile troupe "The Emerging Dragon Theatre Group" in the early 1980s. In 1982, the couple were invited to Italy by the National Italian Teacher's Organisation to instruct teachers in Trieste and Udine on how to develop drama courses for youth. Their programme focused on having a student provide a word, which could then spark an improvisational play. After a three-week course in March, Grünberg returned to her post as the theatre director at the Emerging Dragon.

=== Anti-nuclear activism (1980–1990) ===
In 1980, Grünberg began involvement in the anti-nuclear movement in Britain, serving as a spokesperson for the Bridgwater Anti-Nuclear Group (BANG). She participated in a protest in Bridgwater over the transport of nuclear waste through the town from the Hinkley Point Nuclear Power Stations to be dumped in the Bristol Channel. The following year, the government announced plans to extend its nuclear power coverage, and the group Alliance against Hinkley C was founded by Grünberg and other activists. A group of Scandinavian women which included Grünberg, who were taking part in Peace March '82, boarded the Women's Peace Train in Stockholm, Sweden, in the summer of 1982 and made their way to Leningrad. They intended to take part in rallies throughout Russia to protest the arms race. The Scandinavians' activities were carefully controlled and their contact with Soviet citizens was limited. Nevertheless, some members of the group, including Grünberg, who at the time was the national coordinator of the British Women's Peace Alliance; Cees van der Wel, a Dutch journalist; and Jean Stead, a reporter for The Guardian, were allowed to meet the Olga and Yuri Medvedkov, who were founders of the independent peace initiative, the Group to Establish Trust between the USSR and the USA, known as "Trust-Builders". In August, the British government announced plans to build Hinkley Point C nuclear power station. The Alliance against Hinkley C developed a newsletter to protest its construction and raise awareness of the environmental issues of nuclear power usage.

The actress Julie Christie led a delegation of activists, which was organised by Grünberg, on a lobbying trip to the United States in 1984. The delegation included women from each European country where Cruise and Pershing II missiles were deployed. Their aim was to meet congressional members and First Lady Nancy Reagan to protest the presence of US missiles in Europe. In May they met with Richard Burt, assistant secretary of state for European and Canadian affairs, Paul Nitze, chief negotiator of the Intermediate-Range Nuclear Forces Treaty, as well as some members of Congress. Despite the activists bringing public-opinion polls showing widespread disapproval for the missiles and fears that they made Europeans targets for attack, both Burt and Nitze dismissed their concerns. Grünberg remained in the US for several months after the initial meeting, and in September began touring with Luisa Morgantini, an Italian trade union leader, and Heidemarie Dann, a member of the West German Green Party to promote US-Soviet disarmament. The women spent three weeks travelling to five states – Pennsylvania, New York, Ohio, Florida, and Texas – speaking to women's groups and university students, urging them to oppose nuclear expansion and back candidates who were in favour of peace in the upcoming election.

In 1986, the Alliance against Hinkley C was renamed as the Stop Hinkley Expansion Campaign (SHE). The organisation was funded by Greenpeace, and Grünberg and the journalist Crispin Aubrey were joint coordinators of the group's programmes. SHE was one of the main opponents to the construction of a new plant and spent over £50,000 on their opposition campaign. They participated in the 14-month long public inquiry, which ran from the end of 1988 until December 1989, into whether Hinkley Point C should be built. Grünberg argued that a new station would be unnecessary if better energy conservation practices were put in place. Among those conservation ideas were installation of better insulation and renewable energy systems which caused less harm to the environment. More than 600 witnesses were called to testify in the inquiry and 22,000 people signed objections to construction of Hinkley C. Despite the opposition, Queen's Counsel Michael Barnes, who conducted the hearings, recommended building the plant in 1990, but said any construction would be delayed until the review of Britain's Nuclear Policy in 1994. Grünberg vowed that SHE would continue to oppose the project and advocated for resources to be spent instead on wind and wave power systems. Plans were abandoned to construct Hinkley C or any other new power stations in 1995.

=== Environmental activism (1990–2019) ===
Grünberg began transitioning towards environmental activism in 1990. That year, she travelled to the 5th Citizens Involvement and Public Awareness Conference, held in Riga at the University of Latvia. The conference was held to commemorate the fifth anniversary of the Chernobyl disaster and Grünberg was invited to speak on Stop Hinkley's opposition to creating more nuclear power plants in Britain. She travelled to Kyiv, Ukraine, in 1991 to participate in the commemorations of Chernobyl and to discuss environmental opposition to nuclear expansion. After SHE was successful in warding off the construction of Hinkley C, Grünberg moved to Ullapool, Scotland, and began construction of an ecohouse. The house was powered by a wind turbine and water, used recycled newspapers for insulation, and had a wood-burning stove for heat. The 200-square-metre timber frame structure was located on 3 1/2 acres of land, where Grünberg planted an organic vegetable garden and 300 native trees. She intended the house to serve as a model to help others learn how to make their homes more green. She broadcast a weekly radio program "What on Earth Are We up to" on Lochbroom FM, a community radio project which focused on news and cultural events in the Scottish Highlands. In order to raise sufficient funds to complete the construction, she moved to Edinburgh, but in 1998 decided to sell the house because of the exhausting attention required to ensure that the materials she used were made with green technology. In 2004, Grünberg hosted an exhibition of her mother's works at the Danish Cultural Institute of Edinburgh to mark the centennial of her birth.

After several years in Edinburgh, Grünberg moved to Kelso in the Scottish Borders, where she worked as a life coach. Around 2008, she moved to Hawick and became involved in the A Greener Hawick group, which was part of the transition town movement. The movement aimed to plan for the future by imagining a world without fossil fuels. To prepare for that eventuality, members learned to grow their own food, heat their own homes, and make their own clothes. Grünberg was one of A Greener Hawick organisers for the launch of the Hawick pound. The idea was to create a currency for consumers to buy from local merchants and was launched in 2010. She toured France over the three years she was involved in the transition movement spreading its philosophy and in 2011, she decided to move to Nyons, France. She continued to advocate for the transition movement and as an ambassador for the campaign in France, spoke frequently on the need to preserve the environment. She made one of her last presentations in Nyons at a conference on climate in June 2019.

== Death and legacy ==
Grünberg died on 16 August 2019, in Nyons, France. Her obituary, written by the SHE activist Jill Sutcliffe, called Grünberg "a force to be reckoned with", and characterised her as a passionate activist with skill in drawing people in to the movements with which she was involved. Sutcliffe said that although Grünberg lived most of her life in Britain, she was "never very British".
