= Jerry F. Hough =

American political scientist (1935–2020)

Jerry Fincher Hough (April 26, 1935 – May 24, 2020) was an American political scientist. Hough was the James B. Duke Professor of Political Science at Duke University and his research focused on domestic American politics, the Soviet Union, the democratization of Russia, and American efforts at nation-building. Hough is a part of the "revisionist school" on Soviet history, maintaining that the level of terror was much exaggerated and that the Soviet Union was institutionally weak under Joseph Stalin, among other things. He saw the focus of his research and teaching as "the relationship of long term economic development and political institutions". In his final decade he focused on "the American experience in order to better understand the way that states, markets, and democracies develop and the way in which effective and stable ones can be created and maintained."

He had three children from his first marriage. His third wife was the Australian-American historian of the Soviet Union Sheila Fitzpatrick.

== Education and career ==
Entering Harvard on scholarship at age 16, Hough received his A.B., A.M. and PhD from Harvard University. His first teaching positions were at the University of Toronto and at the University of Illinois at Urbana-Champaign. Hough taught at Duke from 1973 until 2016, and was professor emeritus at the time of his death. He was a fellow at the Kennan Institute of the Wilson Center in 1984, where he worked on a project on the administration of Soviet agriculture. He was a nonresident senior fellow at The Brookings Institution from the mid-1980s through the 1990s. From 1990 to 1996 he founded and directed the Center on East-West Trade, Investments, and Communication at Duke University.

In his autobiographical preface to Changing Party Coalitions: The Mystery of Red State-Blue State Alignment, Hough discussed the impact of historical events and key mentors on this thinking. He wrote, “Stalin died during my first class on the Soviet Union. It was taught by Merle Fainsod, a great Americanist and a great specialist on the Soviet Union who became the supervisor of my doctoral dissertation. Perhaps my greatest debt at Harvard is to William Yandell Elliott, who was given the task of being my tutor in my junior and senior year and who supervised my honors thesis on American policy toward the Soviet Union from 1940 to 1946. At that time Elliott was a close adviser to Vice President Richard Nixon and the dissertation supervisor of Henry Kissinger — and, as such, had a key unrecognized role in bringing the two together. I learned about the problems of nuclear deterrence from Elliott five years before Kissinger was to make the arguments in public. But most of all Elliott delighted in teaching a young boy from the California desert the insider's perspective on how Washington politics really worked. Others also come to mind. Talcott Parsons and Barrington Moore infused Soviet studies at Harvard with a developmental perspective. I took courses from Zbigniew Brzezinski, Jimmy Carter's National Security Adviser, and was the teaching assistant for Marshall Shulman, who was to become the adviser on the Soviet Union to Cyrus Vance, Carter's Secretary of State. Never was I a more confident — or accurate — forecaster than on the problems Carter would have in his foreign policy when he gave both of my former professors a key role in his Administration. Yet, I learned an enormous amount from the conflicting perspectives of the two.”

== Legacy ==
=== Academic work ===
Through the 1990s Hough worked extensively to secure large research grants to support the research of the next generation of scholars, many of whom were fellows at The Center for East West Trade, Investment, and Communications at Duke. Those younger scholars, many of whom worked on the issues of Post-Soviet nationalities, included Dominique Arel, Ronald Suny, William Reisinger, Eugene Huskey, Cynthia Kaplan, Gerry Easter, Evelyn Davidheiser, and Susan Goodrich Lehmann. His Center published the "Journal of Soviet Nationalities" and hosted the Nationalities Workshop and the Social Science Research Center Workshop on Soviet Domestic Politics.

Hough co-founded the Russian Survey Network (RSN) in 1993 along with Sergei Tumanov (Director of the Center for Sociological Studies at Moscow State University), Mikhail Nikolaevich Guboglo (deputy director of the Institute for Ethnology and Anthropology of the Russian Academy of Sciences), Tatiana Guboglo, and Susan Goodrich Lehmann. The network (Hough's brainchild) consisted of more than 200 social scientists working in Russian oblasts and Autonomous Republics. The network collaborated on numerous large-scale survey research projects between 1993 and 2004. The largest of these was a survey of 51,000 residents of Russian oblasts and Autonomous Republics that was conducted in one month in 1993. The survey was conducted in Russian and multiple ethnic languages in the Autonomous Republics. In addition to providing social and political attitudes, respondents provided education, occupation, and first names for themselves, their parents, and their oldest child, making this an unmatched data source for analyzing social mobility and cultural assimilation during the Soviet era. Also important to Hough was that this work financially sustained hundreds of Russian and Soviet scholars and their graduate students working at regional universities during the transition period which followed the break-up of the Soviet Union.

In the late 1990s Hough transitioned from analyzing Russian and Post-Soviet politics to analyzing the American experience. In Changing Party Coalitions: The Mystery of the Red State-Blue State Alignment, published in 2006, Hough argued that historically the Democratic-Republican party alignment was “based on the great conflict between the North and the South and on that among the hostile European-American ‘races.’ Both of these conflicts basically ended in the 1960s and 1970s as European-Americans became ‘whites.’” As a result of the disappearance of the traditional basis for their coalitions, the two major political parties have been trying to find a new basis for their coalitions. Hough argued that "narrow cultural issues are used as electoral platforms in today's politics not because of their inherent importance, but because of party strategies."

His final published work, co-authored with Robin Grier, was The Long Process of Development: Building Markets and States in Pre-Industrial England, Spain, and their Colonies (Cambridge: Cambridge University Press, 2014). This groundbreaking book examined England and Spain's history from 1000 to 1800 and the legacy of these countries in the United States and Mexico to explain why development takes centuries. Synthesizing the classic works of Douglass North, Mancur Olson and Max Weber, Hough and Grier emphasize the need for an effective state.

At the time of his death, Hough was working on several book manuscripts including one on the origins of the Cold War from 1930 to 1960. It is based on over a decade of research into American sources, including the archived papers of over 100 individuals. In it, Hough argues that "the Cold War was Soviet-American cooperation to end the centuries of war between Britain, France, and Germany, but surface confrontation was the glue necessary to hold it together." Another of his working manuscripts, George Washington and the Formation of the American Political System, 1774-1799 focuses on the political philosophy of the Founding Fathers and the way they solved the religious conflicts and the collective action problems of the revolution and the Constitutional Convention.

=== Political commentary ===
An avid blogger and editorial writer, Hough was the focus of a controversy in 2015 around his online comment to The New York Times article "How Racism Doomed Baltimore", in which he compared Asians and Blacks. He wrote "So where are the editorials that say racism doomed the Asian-Americans. They didn't feel sorry for themselves, but worked doubly hard. I am a professor at Duke University. Every Asian student has a very simple old American first name that symbolizes their desire for integration. Virtually every black has a strange new name that symbolizes their lack of desire for integration." He later publicized a letter to further explain his opinions, in which he made an analogy to Duke's basketball coach Mike Krzyzewski: "Coach K did not obsess with all the Polish jokes about Polish stupidity. He pushed ahead and achieved. And by his achievement and visibility, he has played a huge role in destroying stereotypes about Poles. Many blacks have done that too, but no one says they have done as well on the average as the Asians. In my opinion, the time has come to stop talking incessantly about race relations in general terms as the President [Obama] and activists have advocated, but talk about how the Asians and Poles got ahead — and to copy their approach. I don't see why that is insensitive or racist." He was on an academic leave in 2015 that was not related to the controversy.

== Original research projects ==
- 1993–94. "The Impact of Privatization on Urban Social Geography in Yaroslavl, Russia." Co-PI with Blair Ruble and Susan Goodrich Lehmann. Funder: Carnegie Corporation. 2,500 surveys.
- 1993–94. "1993 Russian Parliamentary Election Study." Co-PI with Tim Colton and Susan Goodrich Lehmann. Funder: NSF SBR-94-02548. 3,800 surveys.
- 1994–95. "Changing Social Structure in Russia." Co-PI with Tim Colton and Susan Goodrich Lehmann. Funder: NSF SBR-94-12051, the Carnegie Corporation, and the John D. and Catherine T. MacArthur Foundation. 51,000 surveys from 51 Russian oblasts and ARs.
- 1994–95. "Religious and Ethnic Tolerance in the Muslim Regions of Russia." Co-PI with David Laitin and Susan Goodrich Lehmann. Funder: U.S. Department of State. 10,000 surveys.
- 1995–96. "Political and Social Attitudes in the 1995 Russian Parliamentary Election." Co-PI with Susan Goodrich Lehmann. Funder: NSF and USIA. 3,800 surveys.
- 1996. "The 1996 Presidential Election Study: A Panel Study." Co-PI with Susan Goodrich Lehmann. Funder: NSFSBR-96-01315 and USIA. 3,800 surveys.
- 1996–97. "Values and Life Choices of High School Seniors, 25 & 32 Year Olds: A Comparison of Russians and non-Russians." Co-PI with Susan Goodrich Lehmann. Funder: John D. and Catherine T. MacArthur Foundation and the National Council for Eurasian and East European Research Grant 812–26. 4,400 surveys.

== Selected works ==
=== Congressional testimony and television appearances ===
- "Soviet Succession." Select Committee on Intelligence of the United States Senate, 9.29.1982.
- "Domestic Politics in the Soviet Union & the Summit." C-SPAN, 5.25.1988.
- "Future of East-West Relations." Brookings Institution, 11.1.1989.
- "Communist Economies." Senate Foreign Relations Committee, 12.13.1989.

=== Books ===
- The Soviet Prefects: The Local Party Organs in Industrial Decision-Making, Cambridge, Harvard University Press, 1969.
- The Soviet Union and Social Science Theory, Cambridge, Harvard University Press, 1977.
- with Merle Fainsod, How the Soviet Union is Governed, Harvard University Press, 1979.
- Soviet Leadership in Transition, The Brookings Institution, 1980.
- The Polish Crisis, The Brookings Institution, 1982.
- The Struggle for Third World: Soviet Debates and American Options, The Brookings Institution, 1986.
- Russia and the West: Gorbachev and the Politics of Reform, Simon and Schuster, 1988.
- Opening Up the Soviet Economy, The Brookings Institution, 1989.
- Russia and the West: Gorbachev and the Politics of Reform, second edition, New York, Simon & Schuster, 1990.
- with Evelyn Davidheiser and Susan Goodrich Lehmann, The 1996 Russian Presidential Election, Washington, The Brookings Institution, 1996.
- Democratization and Revolution in the USSR, 1985-1991, Washington, The Brookings Institution, 1997.
- with Timothy Colton (eds), Growing Pains : The 1993 Russian duma Election, Washington, The Brookings Institution, 1998.
- The Logic of Economic Reform in Russia, 1991-1998, Washington, The Brookings Institution, 2001.
- Changing Party Coalitions: The Strange Red-Blue State Alignment, New York, Agathon, 2006.
- with Robin Grier,The Long Process of Development: Building Markets and States in Pre-industrial England, Spain, and their Colonies, Cambridge University Press, 2014.

=== Book chapters ===
- with Susan Goodrich Lehmann, "The Mystery of Opponents of Economic Reform among the Yeltsin Voters." PP. 190–227 in Voters in Post-Communist Russia, edited by Matthew Wyman, Stephen White, and Sarah Oates. Cheltenham: Edward Elgar Press, 1988.
- "Perestroika and Soviet Relations with the West." pp. 19–30 in Old Myths and New Realities in the United States-Soviet Relations, eds. Donald R. Kelly and Hoyt Purvis. Praeger, 1990.
- "Lessons for Western Theories of International Security and Relations." pp. 181–200 in Five Years that Shook the World: Gorbachev's Unfinished Revolution, ed. by Harley D. Balzer. Boulder: Westview Press, 1991.
- "Political Cleavages in Yaroslavl Politics." In The New Legislative Politics in the Former Soviet Union and Eastern Europe, ed. by Thomas Remington. Westview Press, 1994.
- "The Structure of the Russian Legislature and its Impact on Party Development." In Democratization in Russia: The Development of Legislative Institutions, ed. by Jeffrey W. Hahn. Armonk: NY: M.E. Sharpe, 1996.

=== Articles ===
- "The Technical Elite vs. the Party", Problems of Communism (01/1959).
- "Behind the Stories about Khrushchev's Opposition", The Reporter (01/1962).
- "The Stalin-Trotsky Split: A Lesson for Kremlinologists", The Reporter (01/1963).
- "Enter N.S. Khrushchev", Problems of Communism (01/1964).
- "A Harebrained Scheme in Retrospect", Problems of Communism, (01/1965).
- "The Soviet Concept of the Relationship between the Lower Party Organs and the State Administration", Slavic Review (06/1965).
- "The Soviet Elite I: Groups and Individuals", Problems of Communism (01/1967).
- "The Soviet Elite II: In Whose Hands the Future?", Problems of Communism (01/1967).
- "The Soviet System: Petrification or Pluralism?" Problems of Communism (01/1972).
- "The bureaucratic model and the nature of the soviet system." Administration & Society (01/1973).
- "Soviet Urban Politics and Comparative Urban Theory." Journal of Comparative Administration (08/1973).
- "The Soviet Experience and the Measurement of Power". Journal of Politics (08/1975).
- "Brezhnev: The Man and the Era." Problems of Communism, (01/1976).
- "Political Participation in the Soviet Union." Soviet Studies (01/1976).
- "Thinking About Thinking About Dissent" Studies in Comparative Communism, (01/1979).
- "Generation Gap and the Brezhnev Succession" Problems of Communism, (01/1979).
- "Why the Russians Invaded" Nation, (01/1980).
- "The Evolution of the Soviet World View" World Politics, (07/1980).
- "The Evolving Soviet Debate on Latin-America" Latin American Research Review, (01/1981).
- ""Interest Groups" and "Pluralism" in the Soviet Union" The Soviet and Post Soviet Review, (01/1981).
- "Brezhnev's Burdens" The Brookings Review, (12/1981).
- "Soviet succession and policy choices" Bulletin of the Atomic Scientists, (11/1982).
- "Andropov's First Year" Problems of Communism, (01/1983).
- "Evolution in the Soviet Political System" Acta Slavica Iaponica,(01/1984).
- "The Revolutionary Road Runs Out". The Nation, 1985.
- "Gorbachev's Strategy". Foreign Affairs, (01/1985).
- "Soviet Interpretation and Response". Arms Control and the Strategic Defense Initiative: Three Perspectives, (10/1985).
- "The Gorbachev Reform: A Maximal Case". Soviet Economy, (01/1986).
- "The Future of Soviet-American Relations". Current History, (10/1986).
- "On the Road to Paradise Again?: Keeping Hopes for Russia Realistic", Brookings Review (01/1993).
- "Attitudes on Economic Reform and Democratization and the 1993 Election", Post Soviet Affairs vol. 1 (1994).
- "Economic Reform and Russian 'Imperialism'" Brookings Review vol. 12, no. 3 (July 1994).
- "America's Russia Policy - The Triumph of Neglect" Current History vol. 93, no. 585. (October 1, 1994): 308–12.
- "Thermidor in Russia" Post Problems of Communism No.1 (October 1994).
- "Sociology, the State and Language Politics."Post Soviet Politics Vol. 12, No.1 (1996): 1–19.
- "The political geography of European Russia: Republics and oblasts." Post Soviet Geography and Economics No. 2 (December 1, 1998):63-95.

=== Editorials and occasional papers ===
- "The USSR and the Sources of Soviet Policy." Washington, D.C.: Woodrow Wilson International Center for Scholars; Kennan Institute Occasional Paper Series #34, 1978.
- "‘Reform’ Goes Tumbling With Ruble Devaluation." Brookings Institution Op ED, August 18, 1998.
- "re: Gessen's article ‘The Quiet Americans Behind the U.S.-Russia Imbroglio’.” JRL Russia List, May 10, 2018.
