= Dagmar Wilson =

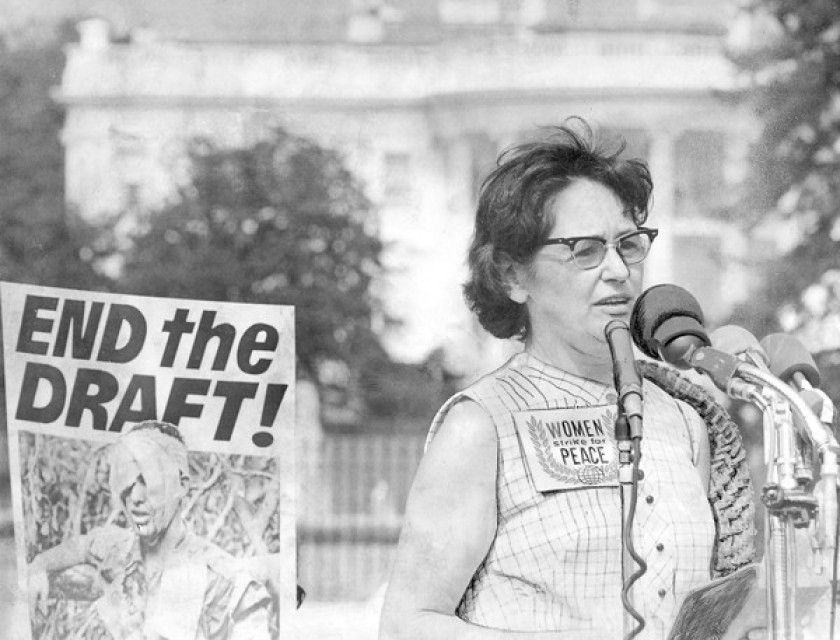
Dagmar Wilson

Dagmar Searchinger Wilson (January 25, 1916 – January 6, 2011) was an American anti-nuclear testing activist, artist, and illustrator of children's books for Whitman's Children's Books.

Born in Manhattan, New York City, her parents were Cesar and Marion Searchinger. Wilson founded Women Strike for Peace in 1961 to end the testing of nuclear weapons.

== Early motivations and accomplishments ==
- When the US-Soviet Arms race began, Dagmar Wilson, a concerned mother of 3, learned about the implications of nuclear war.
- She started a telephone tree, urging her friends to call their friends to marshal support for her one day demonstration in support of peace and disarmament.
- On November 1, 1961, prior to the formation of any cohesive anti-war movement, Dagmar Wilson and Bella Abzug founded a loose network of 50,000 mothers, grandmothers, and other women, and successfully demonstrated in 60 cities across the country against atmospheric nuclear testing.
- In 1962, Wilson was subpoenaed by the House Un-American Activities Committee, with members of her organization, Women's Strike for Peace. This testimony was measure of humor to challenge committee attempts of portraying organization as a systematic way into communism.
- Calling on president John F. Kennedy to "end the arms race - not the human race," Wilson and her colleagues won wide attention from world leaders and press. Kennedy gave partial credit to Wilson and her fellows to force the Cold War superpowers to eventually sign a nuclear-test ban treaty.

== See also ==
- List of peace activists
