= Mandisa Monakali =

South African activist (died 2024)

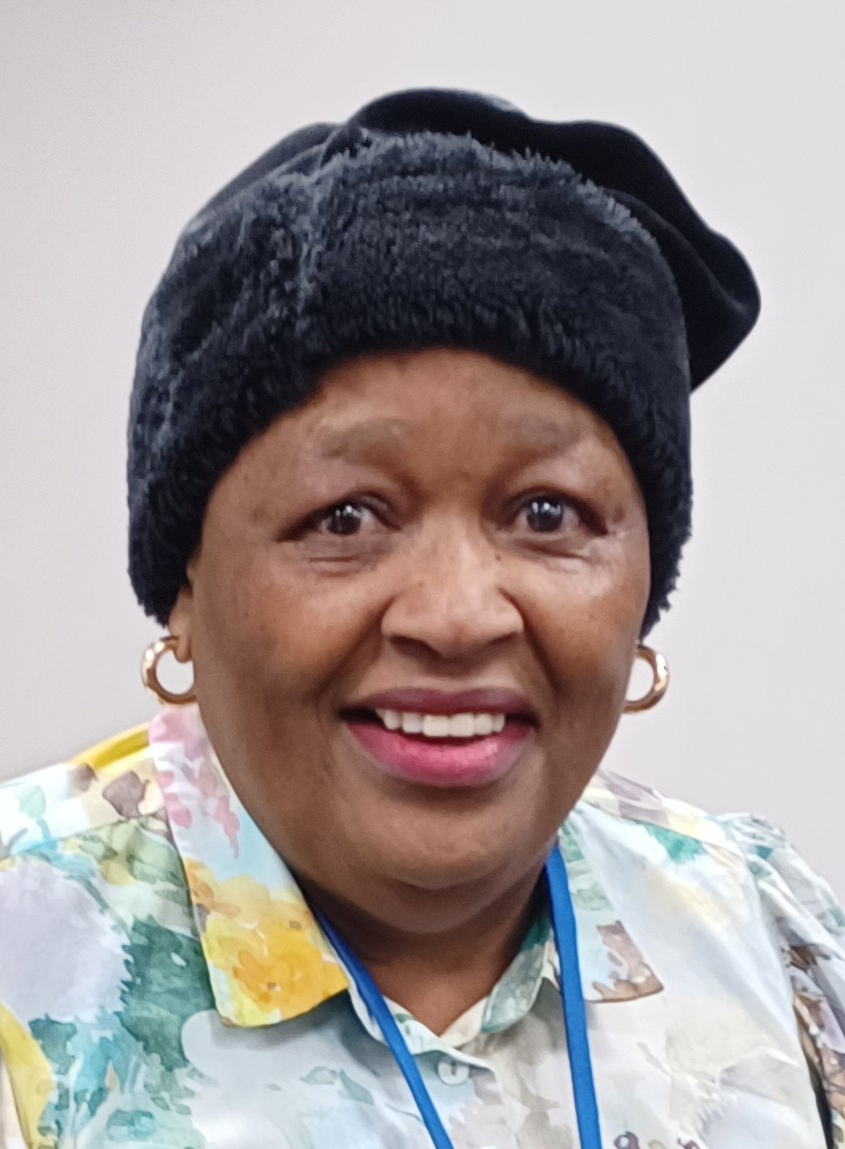
- Monakali in 2023
- Born: Cape Town, South Africa
- Died: 3 November 2024
- Education: University of the Western Cape (B.A., 1983)
- Alma mater: University of the Western Cape
- Occupations: Nonprofits, community organizer
- Website: www.ilithalabantu.org.za

Mandisa Monakali (died 3 November 2024) was a South African public speaker, educator, social worker, researcher, lobbyist, advocate, project manager, strategic planner, workshop and community organizer. She was the founder and Executive Director of Ilitha Labantu. She worked on women's rights for 35 years.

Monakali's work addressed issues such as violence against women and children, human rights, equality, rural development, Millennium Development Goals, and Sustainable Development Goals.

== Early life and education ==
Mandisa Monakali was born in, Gugulethu, Cape Town, South Africa. She began advocating for women's rights at age 16. During the apartheid period, she started a program to educate women in her home. She was arrested and spent 18 months in jail. Upon her release she lived underground for a year until it was safe.

She attended ID Mkize High School in Cape Town. She then attended the University of the Western Cape, where she studied preschool education. She graduated from the university with a Bachelor of Arts in 1983.

== Career ==
Monakali spent most of her adult life in human and community development, with a focus on gender development and leadership training for women and youth. She was a member of Women's Environment and Development Organization (WEDO), and organized the Women's Action Tent at the World's Summit on Sustainable Development.

Monakali and Litha Musyimi-Ogana, the Regional Director of The African Center for Empowerment in Kenya, organized the Women's Peace Train during the 2002 World Summit on Sustainable Development (WSSD), 27 August – 4 September 2002. The Women's Peace Train journeyed from Rwanda to South Africa. Women from several African countries escorted the Peace Train to advocate for and demand an end to wars and conflict in their countries. The Peace Train's goal as stated in the invitations they sent out; "To pass on a strong message to the continent′s leaders, war mongers, armies, guerrillas, arms traders and dealers in the African continent that women want peace and stability for their children and future generations and call upon ring leaders and perpetrators of these wars to end them forthwith." The message to the WSSD was that there can be do sustainable development without addressing peace. The Africa Women's Peace Train was launched in Kampala, Uganda on 15 August with a ceremony where a Peace Torch was received. The Peace Train traveled through Kenya, Tanzania, Malawi, Zambia, Mozambique, Botswana and ending in Johannesburg, South Africa for the World Summit on Sustainable Development (WSSD) on 25 August 2002.

In 2005 and 2015, Monakali represented South Africa at the annual United Nations Conference on the Status of Women. She stated at the CSW59 in 2015; "For us Beijing +20 was not about UN, it was about our daily lives as South African women and you could see what was happening now in the country. The number of women we have in construction for instance has increased".

She was one of the organizers for Take Back the Night in South Africa.

=== Ilithia Labantu ===
Ilitha Labantu was founded in 1989 and was registered as a non-profit NGO in South Africa with the Department of Social Development in 2003. It is a South Africa social service and educational organization that works and provides services for disadvantaged Gugulethu, Township (South Africa) communities throughout the Western Cape Town. Mandisa participates globally in conferences and events representing Ilitha and South Africa. The organization promotes peace and development with a focus on economic empowerment, and to eradicate violence against women.

Ilitha's main focus is the UN Sustainable Development Goal 5: achieving gender equality and empowering all women and girls.

Ilitha focuses on community mobilization, outreach, and program initiatives for women to participate in programs that are economically and socially beneficial. The organization was created to deal with violence against women and children which was seen as an obstacle to development in the township communities.

Ilitha Labantu sponsors events during the annual commemoration of the 1956 Women's March, an anti-apartheid demonstration that was held in Pretoria, South Africa.

== Awards ==
- Cape Towns Woman of the Year
- Femina Woman of the year
- SAA Women of the Year
- The UN Human Rights Activists Award
- New York Women Watch Award

== Death and tribute ==
Monakali died on 3 November 2024 after a short illness with cancer. Aleta Miller, UN Women Multi-Country Representative for South Africa said the death of Monakali leaves a big gap in southern Africa’s women’s rights movement.
