= Rita Kernn-Larsen =

Danish surrealist painter (1904–1998)

Rita Kernn-Larsen (1 January 1904 – 10 April 1998) was a Danish surrealist painter. She was born to a wealthy family in Hillerød, and attended the private Marie Mørks School there. She began to paint at a young age, and after spending time abroad in Oslo, Norway, she attended the Royal Danish Academy of Fine Arts to fine-tune her craft, but found the teachings there to be too traditional. Instead, she moved to Paris and joined Fernand Léger's academy, studying under him until 1933, when she returned to Denmark and opened up her own studio.

Throughout the 1930s, Kernn-Larsen's style moved from a more decorative style to surrealism. She regularly attended exhibitions as one of the only female surreal artists, including the London International Surrealist Exhibition in 1936. In 1937, Kernn-Larsen moved back to Paris and met Peggy Guggenheim, who opened a solo exhibition for her the following year in London. She remained in London throughout the war years with her husband, Jewish art dealer Isak Grünberg. At that time she departed from surrealism, focusing on a more real approach to her paintings during the war. The couple had a daughter, Danielle Grünberg in London in 1940, who would become a well-known anti-nuclear and environmental activist.

After the war, Kernn-Larsen moved to Saint-Jeannet, Alpes-Maritimes, France, using the Southern French landscape as a motif for her later paintings. She lived there from 1947 to 1992, and while there worked with ceramics, and published a children's book, The Golden Village.She continued to attend exhibitions primarily in Denmark, with her last one being a retrospective in 1995 at Randers Art Museum.
