= Ruth Gage-Colby =

- Born: February 1, 1899; Olivia, Minnesota
- Died: September 25, 1984 (aged 85); Norwalk, California
- Resting place: Hector, Minnesota
- Occupation(s): Journalist, lecturer, activist, organizer
- Organization(s): Women's International League for Peace and Freedom; Women Strike for Peace; United Nations
- Spouse: Woodard L. Colby (married 1919)

Ruth Gage-Colby (1 February 1899 – 25 September 1984) was an American lecturer, journalist, pacifist, and activist. A well-known figure in the 20th-century peace movement, Gage-Colby occupied leadership positions in the Women's International League for Peace and Freedom, and Women Strike for Peace.

== Early life and marriage ==
Ruth Gage was born in Olivia, Minnesota on 1 February 1899, the daughter of Lillian E. Knox and George Franklin Gage. Her father was an attorney and Renville County probate judge. Educated at Olivia High School, Gage then attended Minneapolis' Stanley College. On returning home at the end of the 1916 school year, Gage and her sister were both struck with polio - from which her sister, Lucille, died.

The next year, Gage moved with her mother to Minneapolis, where she enrolled at the University of Minnesota. She graduated with a degree in political science in 1919.

On 10 September 1919, Gage married physician Woodard L. Colby, who she had met while in hospital. The pair spent two years in Venice, where Ruth volunteered with the American Friends Service Committee. While in Venice, Gage-Colby met Dorothy Detzer, then National Executive Secretary of the Women's International League for Peace and Freedom. It may have been this friendship which influenced Gage-Colby to join the League, in which she would ultimately rise to leadership positions.

In June 1923, now back in Minnesota, Gage-Colby gave birth to a son, Gage.

== Pre-WW2 ==
Gage-Colby was actively involved in a number of social and literary clubs, alongside efforts for various causes. She also established herself as an interior decorator, specializing in children's playrooms. Gage-Colby was on the board of the Hallie Q. Brown Community Center and was active in Minnesota's Save the Children branch. During the 1920s, with her husband, a paediatrician, Gage-Colby worked to establish wellbaby clinics across the Midwest.

During World War II, Gage-Colby acted as a placement officer for the St. Paul Resettlement Committee, aiding Japanese-Americans interned in Minnesota. Gage-Colby and her colleagues worked to secure employment for Japanese women, and after the way she was invited to Japan - which she visited regularly until the end of her life.

Gage-Colby also took in refugees, and housed the children of Vera Brittain to shelter them during The Blitz. With her husband, she helped to bring the Jewish paediatrician Béla Schick out of fascist Austria, and secure him a role at the University of Minnesota Medical School.

== International activism ==
At the end of the war, with Dorothy Detzer, Gage-Colby attended the charter conference of the United Nations in San Francisco on behalf of the Women's International League for Peace and Freedom. She remained devoted to the UN for the rest of her life, working over the years with UNICEF, as a press correspondent, and later as program director for the Speakers Research Committee. Gage-Colby was one of the founders of the United Nations Correspondents Association.

During the 1960s, Gage-Colby emerged as a leader in movements for peace and human rights. She joined with Women Strike for Peace (WSP), participating in their first march in Washington on 1 November 1961 protesting nuclear weapons testing. A week later, she was their platform speaker at a rally of 5000 women at the United Nations. There, Gage-Colby stated her belief that: "We are one people. We are the human race. We all have the same ultimate goals." She subsequently became coordinator for the group. Gage-Colby spearheaded the development of WSP's international network of women.

Gage-Colby worked with the Soviet Women's Committee to lobby for a Test Ban Treaty. She actively protested US involvement in Vietnam, joining anti-war advocacy group Another Mother for Peace and supporting the National Mobilization Committee to End the War in Vietnam.

Gage-Colby also supported the feminist National Organization for Women, peace groups Promoting Enduring Peace, the National Peace Action Coalition, and the Japan Council Against Atomic and Hydrogen Bombs, the Arab American Women's Friendship Association, the National Conference for New Politics, and the American Humanist Association. During the 1970s, Gage-Colby was the U.S. representative of the Women's International League for Peace and Freedom at the United Nations.

== Death and legacy ==
Ruth Gage-Colby died in Norwalk, California on 25 September 1984, and was interred at the city cemetery in Hector, Minnesota. At the time of her death, she was living in Daytona Beach, Florida.

Her papers are held in the collections of the Minnesota Historical Society, Georgetown University, Swarthmore College, and the Martin Luther King Jr. Memorial Library.
