= Women Strike for Peace =

Women's peace activist group

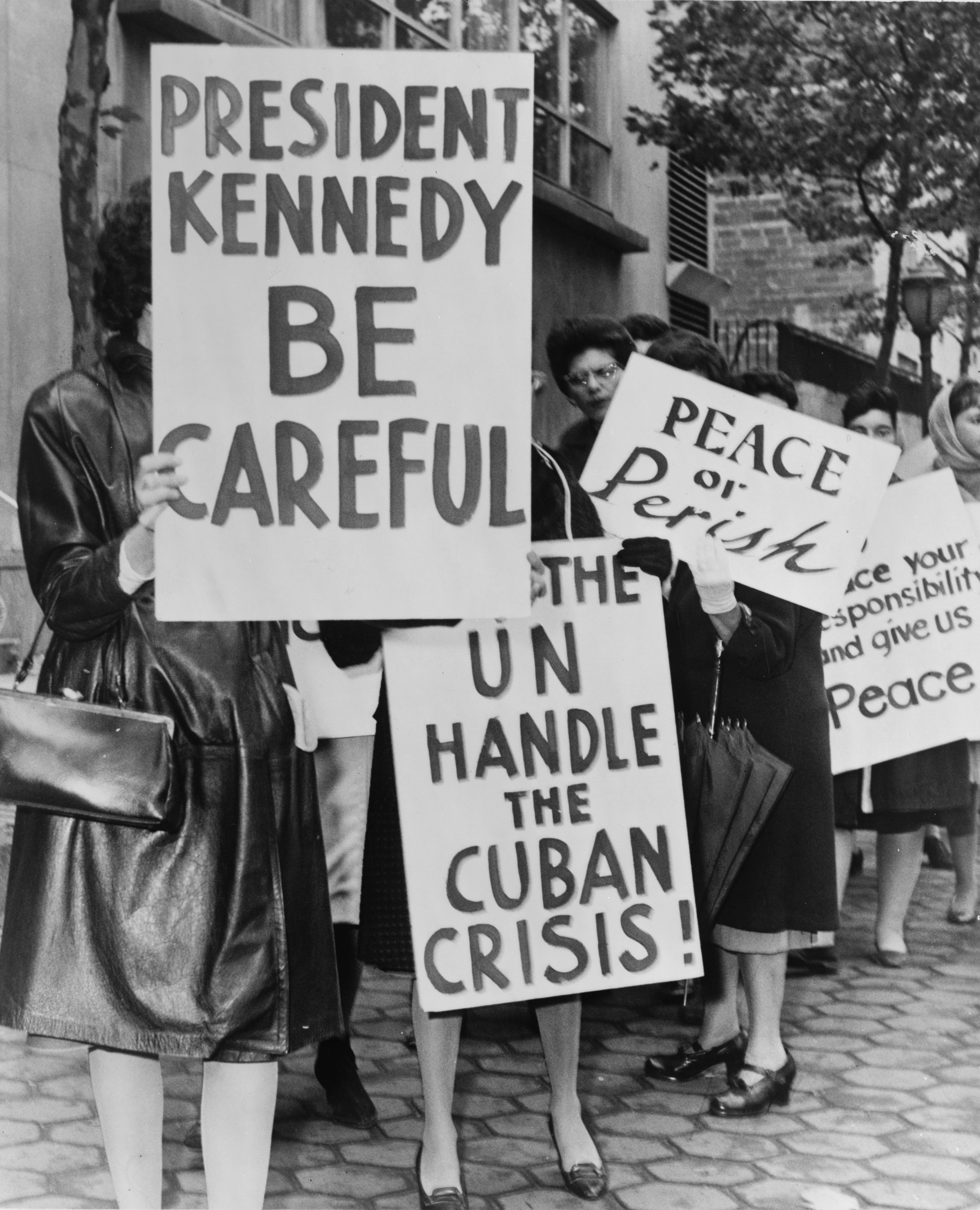
- Abbreviation: WSP
- Formation: 1961
- Founder: Bella Abzug, Dagmar Wilson
- Type: Anti-nuclear; Anti-war
- Affiliations: Women's International League for Peace and Freedom; Women's Peace Society; Women's Peace Union; National Committee of the Causes and Cure of War Canadian Voice of Women for Peace

Women Strike for Peace (WSP, also known as Women for Peace) was a women's peace activist group in the United States. Nearing the height of the Cold War in 1961, about 50,000 women marched in 60 cities around the United States to demonstrate against the testing of nuclear weapons. It was the largest national women's peace protest during the 20th century. Another group action was led by Dagmar Wilson, with about 1,500 women gathering at the foot of the Washington Monument while President John F. Kennedy watched from the White House. The protest helped push the United States and the Soviet Union into signing a nuclear test-ban treaty two years later. Reflecting the era in which the group's leaders had been raised, between the First-wave feminism and the Second-wave feminism movements, their actions and pleas leaned towards female self-sacrifice rather than towards their own self-interests. However, they pushed the power of a concerned mother to the forefront of American politics, transforming the mother from a "passive victim of war to active fighter for peace".

== History ==
=== Formation ===
Women Strike for Peace was founded by Bella Abzug and Dagmar Wilson in 1961. The group initially was part of the movement for a ban on nuclear testing and to end the Vietnam War, first demanding a negotiated settlement, and later total United States withdrawal from Southeast Asia. Their tactics included different forms of legal pressure such as petitions, demonstrations, letter writing, mass lobbies, and lawsuits. The group lobbied individual Congressmen with proxy requests from the Congressman's constituents. They also had a few forms of illegal, nonviolent direct action activities that included sit-ins in congressional offices, and statements of complicity with draft resisters aimed at tying up the courts.

=== Actions ===
On November 1, 1961, at the height of the Cold War, about 50,000 women brought together by Women Strike for Peace marched in 60 cities in the United States to demonstrate against nuclear weapons under the slogan "End the Arms Race not the Human Race". It was the largest national women's peace protest of the 20th century. About 1,500 women led by Dagmar Wilson gathered at the foot of the Washington Monument while President John F. Kennedy watched from a window at the White House. The protest helped "push the United States and the Soviet Union into signing a nuclear test-ban treaty two years later". In January 1962, Berkeley Women for Peace had a thousand women attend the California legislative session to oppose civil defense legislation. Affiliate Seattle Women Act for Peace (SWAP) played a significant role in the protests against the Trident submarine base at Bangor, Washington. The women were moved to action by the Soviet resumption of atmospheric nuclear tests, after a three-year moratorium and by the United States' declaration that it would hold its own tests in retaliation.

=== March on Washington build-up ===
The Women's Strike for Peace organization wasn't a unified one, and they had no known leaders and were completely unknown in the American political scene before the capitol strike on November 1. The women of WSP were responding to several women in Washington D.C. who were unnerved by how much the nuclear arms race was speeding up. The women sent messages from Washington through word of mouth, and telephone calls to friends and contacts from church, already established peace organizations such as the Women's International League for Peace and Freedom (WILPF) across America to cease their normal daily activities and join them from their own homes in a one-day strike to end the arms race. Each strike in each city depended solely on what the women were willing and able to do with different laws and regulations across states.

=== Notable members ===
The group consisted mainly of married-with-children middle-class white women. Its early tactics—including marches and street demonstrations were uncommon in the U.S. at that time—in many ways prefigured those of the anti-Vietnam War movement and of Second-wave feminism. The roots of the organization lay in the traditional female culture, the role women played as full-time wives and mothers and its rhetoric in those years drew heavily on traditional images of motherhood. In particular, in protesting atmospheric nuclear testing, they emphasized that Strontium-90 from nuclear fallout was being found in mother's milk and commercially sold cow's milk, presenting their opposition to testing as a motherhood issue, what Katha Pollitt has called "a maternity-based logic for organizing against nuclear testing." As middle-class mothers, they were less vulnerable to the redbaiting that had held in check much radical activity in the United States since the McCarthy Era. The image projected by WSP of respectable middle-class, middle-aged ladies wearing white gloves and flowered hats while picketing the White House and appealing to the Kremlin to save their children and the planet, helped to legitimize a radical critique of the Cold War and U.S. militarism.

In 1962, the members of the advance party of Women Strike for Peace met with Gertrude Baer, who at the time was the secretary for the Women's International League for Peace and Freedom (WILPF) in Geneva at the Seventeen-Nation Disarmament Conference. With their sights set on anti-militarism, they allied themselves with four other peaceful women's organizations: WILPF, Women's Peace Society (WPS, which was founded in 1919 by Fanny Garrison Villard, daughter of the nineteenth-century abolitionist William Lloyd Garrison), the Women's Peace Union (WPU), and the National Committee of the Causes and Cure of War (NCCCW).

=== House Un-American Activities Committee (HUAC) ===
Women Strike for Peace played a crucial role in bringing down the House Un-American Activities Committee (HUAC). From the beginning of Women Strike for Peace in 1961, the FBI had the group under surveillance due to fear that communism had spread to the mothers of America. Women Strike for Peace approached the committee hearings differently than those summoned before them. In November 1962 the leaders of the group were subpoenaed by the HUAC. After the subpoenas were distributed to the women, Women Strike for Peace released the information to the media before the HUAC could issue a press release, as the committee usually used the news media to discredit the organizations subpoena. When under question the women used their status as mothers to argue their moral high ground, as mothers arguing for peace were the most loyal Americans. Another strategy that differed from those before them was the use of a large quantity of WSP members to volunteer to testify at the hearings, effectively showing that the group had nothing to hide. Political theorist Jean Bethke Elshtain determined that Women Strike for Peace's performance at the HUAC was a success due to the "deconstructive power of a politics of humor, irony, evasion, and ridicule". The use of motherhood and family as a tool for the attack on the congressional hearings showed the "familial-cold war consensus" would soon crumble.

=== Nevada testing sites and their effects ===
The Nevada Proving Ground came to be where the United States perfected their nuclear weaponry. The spot located a mere 65 miles north of Las Vegas replaced the Pacific Islands as a testing ground for these weapons. Coined as an “outdoor laboratory” and an “experimental landscape”, several government sponsored activities took place there. “Doom Towns” were constructed with mannequin families to test these weapons on.

The WSP protested in part because of the effects of the particles and debris that remained in the air after years of nuclear testing. The radioactive effects after World War II were said to be the first global environmental issue in both scale and potency of the “post-war era”, said by historian John McCormack. With more than 120 official weapon tests in the Pacific and Nevada, depositing immense amounts of radioactive debris which caused levels of ionizing radiation to slowly increase over time. The nuclear arms race made the world more radioactive. The debris spread onto things like food and drinks and in the very air we breathed, causing cancer and birth defects. People were ignorant of the possible health risks and would have picnics at high points near the testing site to watch government experiments. Exposure to radiation and the effects it had on civilians and the unborn were a driving force for the Women's Peace Movement to strike to end the nuclear race and stop this rising environmental issue as it was harming the innocent.

Baby Tooth Survey

The Greater St. Louis Citizens’ Committee for Nuclear Information initiated the Baby Tooth Survey. This was a plan to collect 50,000 baby teeth per year, in order to test them and provide a record of how much strontium-90 children in the surrounding areas were taking in. The concentration of strontium-90 is considered the most hazardous form of atomic debris. Participants were asked to mail in the baby teeth of their children in order to participate. Parents were so concerned by the extensive nuclear testing in the atmosphere and the resulting radioactive product that they were very likely to participate in the survey and send in their children's teeth. One piece of evidence that raised concern was that the milk from around the area had some of the highest results when it came to containing strontium-90. “Pure Milk Not Poison” became a common slogan and concerns about the milk led to boycotts and use of powdered milk as a substitute. The results of the survey were clear when it was shown that when testing teeth from children that had been bottle fed, the strontium-90 content increased from 1949 to 1953, but then increased very rapidly between 1954 and 1955, which coincided with the major nuclear testing that began in 1953.

=== Post-1960s ===
In Los Angeles, in 1965 and 1970, the Women Strike for Peace Movement, headed by Mary Clarke, published a cookbook that Clarke inspired. The cookbooks, Peace de Resistance, were printed by the noted Ward Ritchie at the Anderson, Ritchie & Simon Press. Author Esther Lewin had lived in France for a period of time and was well-versed in French cooking. Lewin included simple recipes for those days when WSP required their efforts and more complicated recipes for the more relaxed days.

WSP remained a significant voice in the peace movement throughout the 1980s and 1990s, speaking out against U.S. intervention in Latin America and the Persian Gulf states. On June 12, 1982, Women Strike for Peace helped organize one million people who demanded an end to the arms race. In 1988, they supported Carolyna Marks in the creation of the Unique Berkeley Peace Wall, as well as similar walls in Oakland, Moscow, Hiroshima, and Israel (a joint Jewish and Palestinian children's Peace Wall). In 1991, they protested the Iraq-Persian Gulf War; afterwards, they urged the American government to lift sanctions on Iraq. In the late 1990s, Women Strike for Peace mainly focused on nuclear disarmament.

== Structure ==
The Women Strike for Peace's structure is characterized by a nonhierarchical, loosely structured "unorganized" format that gives nearly total autonomy to its local chapters, and uses consensus methods. The women saw male leaders as "less agitated, more deliberate, and more slowly moved to action", which provided a structure to avoid. Some of the local chapters rapidly became very strong groups in their own right. This structure was created due to the red-baiting other peace organizations, such as SANE and the Women's International League for Peace and Freedom had experienced. The red-baiting was known reduce the effectiveness of organizations due to the damage it did to their reputations. The WSP relied on bold actions fueled by the women's fierce emotional commitment and they used marching, picketing, and other creative displays to achieve their goals.

== Notable members ==
- Bella Abzug, founder of Women Strike for Peace, founder of National Women's Political Caucus, and U.S. Representative for New York.
- Dagmar Wilson, founding member of Women Strike for Peace and children's book illustrator.
- Ruth Gage-Colby, coordinator of the WSP and UN press correspondent.
- Alice Herz, founding member of Detroit's WSP. The first activist to self-immolate on American soil in protest of the Vietnam war.
- Amy Swerdlow, helped organize the movement and was a founding member who later went on to write the book: Women Strike for Peace: Traditional Motherhood and Radical Politics in the 1960s, which was published by the University of Chicago press in 1993.

== See also ==
- National Women's Political Caucus
- Seneca Women's Encampment for a Future of Peace and Justice
- Greenham Common Women's Peace Camp
- Counterculture of the 1960s
- The Ribbon International
- House Un-American Activities Committee
- List of women pacifists and peace activists
- List of peace activists
- List of anti-war organizations
- Canadian Voice of Women for Peace
