= Ilitha Labantu =

South African NGO addressing gender-based violence

- Formation: 1989
- Founded: 1989
- Type: NGO
- Headquarters: Gugulethu, Cape Town
- Location: South Africa
- Coordinates: 33.988° S, 18.570° E
- Website: www.ilithalabantu.org.za

Ilitha Labantu is a South African non-profit organization that was founded in 1989, with its headquarters in Gugulethu, Cape Town. The organisation provides counselling, legal advice, and other support services to survivors of gender-based violence.

== Services ==
The organisation operates the Dorothy Zihlangu Transitional House in Langa, Cape Town, which provides temporary accommodation, psychosocial support, and legal advice to women and children leaving abusive situations; the facility was renovated in partnership with South Africa's national Department of Human Settlements.

== Advocacy ==
In 2026, the organization participated in a march held after the killing of Nosiphiwo Sheila Dosi. The organisation has also engaged in national policy debate on gender-based violence and femicide, and has publicly pressed South Africa's newly established GBVF Council for lack of measurable targets, sustainable funding, and public accountability reporting.
