= Blair Aldridge Ruble =

American non-fiction writer and academic administrator

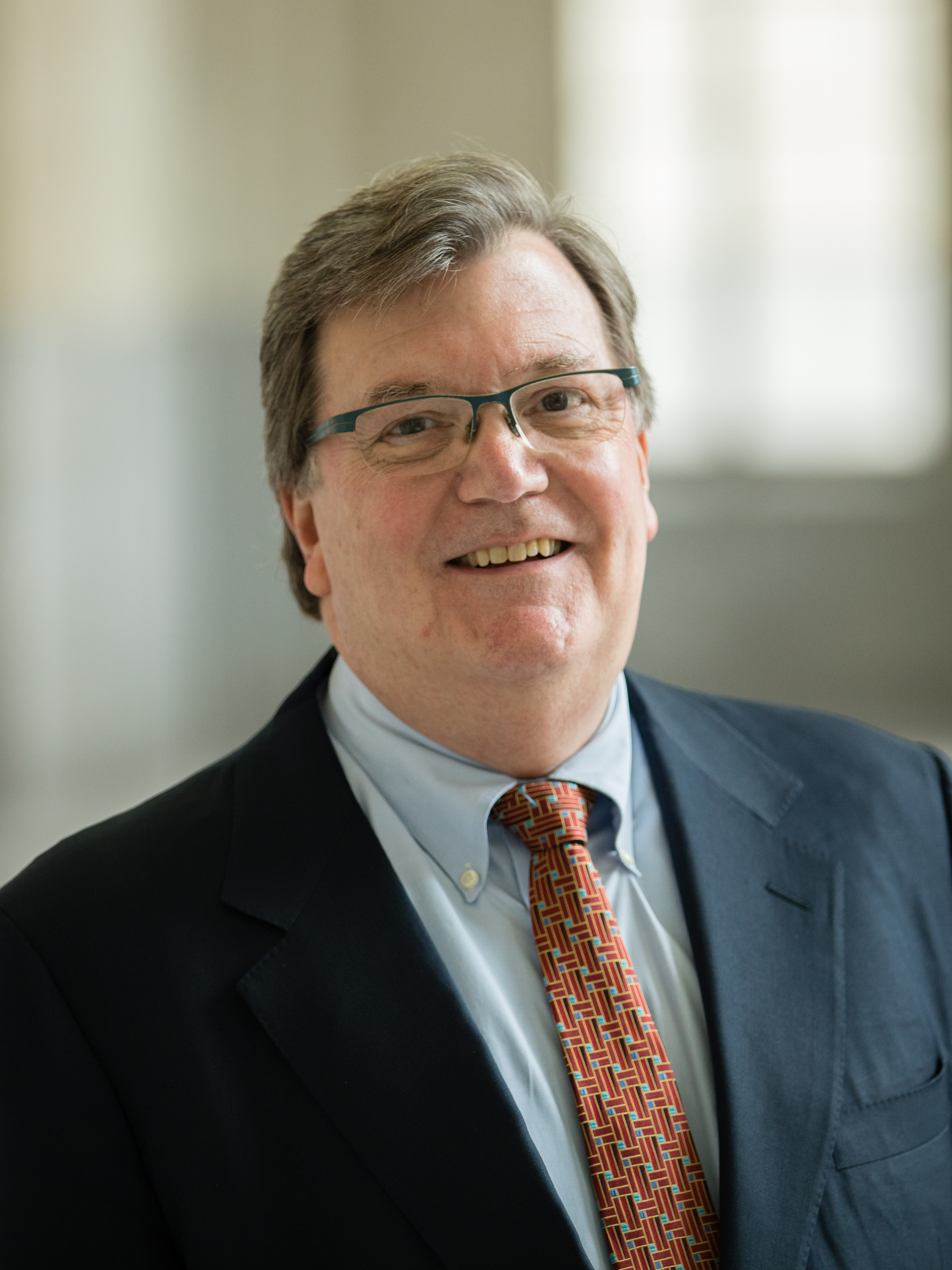
- Blair A. Ruble
- Born: December 18, 1949 (age 76); Beacon, NY
- Occupations: Author and Academic
- Notable work: Muse of Urban Delirium: How the Performing Arts Paradoxically Transform Conflict-Ridden Cities into Centers of Cultural Innovation; Washington's U Street: A Biography
- Website: www.wilsoncenter.org/person/blair-ruble

Blair Aldridge Ruble (born December 18, 1949) is a non-fiction writer and academic administrator whose work has focused on comparative urban studies as well as Russian and Ukrainian affairs.

== Early life and education ==
A native of Beacon, New York, Ruble grew up in Dobbs Ferry, New York, where he attended public schools. Ruble graduated from the University of North Carolina at Chapel Hill with Highest Honors in Political Science (1971), and was elected to the Phi Beta Kappa Honors Society. He received his MA (1973) and PhD (1977) in Political Science from the University of Toronto. He was in residence at Leningrad State University Juridical Faculty (1974-1975). He is the recipient of an Honorary Doctorate (2012) from the Modern Art Research Institute of the National Academy of Arts of Ukraine in Kyiv.

== Career ==
Ruble was affiliated with the Woodrow Wilson International Center for Scholars for several decades, beginning in the late 1970s. He served in various capacities at the Wilson Center between 1977 and 2017, including a long-standing association with the Kennan Institute from 1989 to 2012.

Following this, he was named a Distinguished Fellow, a title he held until the Wilson Center reduced operations in April 2025. Earlier in his career, he was a staff associate at the Social Science Research Council from 1985 to 1989 and served as Assistant Executive Director of the National Council for Soviet and East European Research from 1982 to 1985.

Ruble has held teaching appointments at institutions across the United States and Europe, including George Washington University, the University of Paris X–Nanterre, and the Università della Svizzera italiana in Mendrisio, Switzerland.

In addition to his academic contributions, Ruble has written commentary and opinion pieces for major media outlets, including The New York Times, The Washington Post, USA Today, The Baltimore Sun, and Newsweek.

In 2021, he co-curated “'Areosouls': Murals for Our Times,” an exhibition at Washington, D.C.’s Martin Luther King, Jr. Library, which explored the city’s rich history of street art. His is also the author of the blog The Arts of War: Ukrainian Artists Confront Russia, Initially hosted by the Woodrow Wilson Center's Kennan Institute and moved to the Center for International Theater Development (CITD), offering insights. His longstanding connection to the Kennan Institute includes participation in significant moments of its history—most notably, speaking at the 2005 memorial service for diplomat and scholar George F. Kennan at the Washington National Cathedral.

== Scholarly work ==
Ruble's scholarship spans urban transformation, cultural identity, and the arts’ role in shaping civic life. One of his works, Second Metropolis: Pragmatic Pluralism in Gilded Age Chicago, Silver Age Moscow, and Meiji Japan (2001), explores how social fragmentation often considered a barrier to democracy fostered inclusive public policies in North America’s, Russia’s, and Japan’s “second cities” at the turn of the 20th century.

His critically acclaimed Washington’s U Street: A Biography (2010) traces the cultural and political evolution of one of D.C.'s most iconic neighborhoods, chronicling its legacy as a hub of African American life and urban renewal.

He further explores the intersection of urban spaces and cultural innovation in The Muse of Urban Delirium (2017), which examines how conflict-ridden cities often become centers of artistic transformation. This thread continues in Performing Presence from the Washington Stage (2021), a study of the city’s performing arts scene as a mirror of community and belonging.

His 2024 volume, Changing Cities, Shifting Stages: How the Performing Arts Reveal Urban Transformation, concludes a trilogy that views the performing arts as both a reflection and catalyst of urban change.

Among his most timely and ongoing works is The Arts of War: Ukrainian Artists Confront Russia a multi-volume series capturing the response of Ukrainian artists to the Russian invasion, published annually from 2023 to 2026.

== Personal life ==
Ruble and his wife, Sally, live in Washington, DC.

== Books ==
- (2023–2026). The arts of war: Ukrainian artists confront Russia (Vols. 1–4). Columbia University Press / Ibidem Press.
- Changing Cities, Shifting Stages: How the Performing Arts Reveal Urban Transformation (New Academia Publishers, 2024). https://www.newacademia.com/books/changing-cities-shifting-stages-how-the-performing-arts-reveal-urban-transformation/
- Performing Presence from the Washington Stage (New Academia Publishers, 2021).
- The Muse of Urban Delirium: How the Performing Arts Paradoxically Transform Conflict-Ridden Cities into Centers of Cultural Innovation (New Academia Publishers 2017).
- Performing Community I-IV: Short Essays on Community, Diversity, Inclusion, and the Performing Arts (Woodrow Wilson Center, 2016-2020).
- Washington's U Street: A Biography (Woodrow Wilson Center Press & Johns Hopkins Press 2010).
- Creating Diversity Capital: Transnational Migrants in Montreal, Washington, and Kyiv (Woodrow Wilson Press & Johns Hopkins Press 2005).
- Second Metropolis. Pragmatic Pluralism in Gilded Age Chicago, Silver Age Moscow, and Meiji Japan. (Woodrow Wilson Press & Johns Hopkins Press 2001).
- Money Sings: The Changing Politics of Urban Space in Post-Soviet Yaroslav (Woodrow Wilson Press and Cambridge University Press 2006).
- Leningrad: Shaping a Soviet City (University of California Press 1990).
- Soviet Trade Unions: Their Development in the 1970s (1981).

=== Edited volumes ===
- D.C. Jazz: Historical Portraits of Jazz Music from Washington, DC (edited with Maurice Jackson) (2018)
- Urban Diversity: Space, Culture and Inclusive Pluralism in Cities Worldwide (edited with Caroline Wanjiku Kihato, Mejgan Massoumi, Pep Subiros, and Allison Garland) (2010)
- Cities after the Fall of Communism: Reshaping Cultural Landscapes and European Identity (edited with John Czaplicka and Nida Gelazis) (2009)
- Migration, Homeland and Belonging in Eurasia (edited with Cynthia Buckley with Erin Hoffmann) (2008)
- Place, Identity and Urban Culture: Odesa and New Orleans (edited with Samuel C. Ramer) (2008)
- Integration in Urban Communities. Renegotiating the City (edited with Lisa M. Hanley and Allison Garland) (2008)
- Global Urban Poverty. Setting the Agenda (edited with Allison M. Garland and Mejgan Massouri) (2007)
- 200 let rossiisko-amerikanskikh otnoshenii: naula i obrazovanie. Sbornik statei (edited with Alexander O. Chubarian) (2007)
- Rebounding Identities. The Politics of Identity in the Russian Federation and Ukraine (edited with Dominique Arel) (2005)
- Russia's Engagement with the West: Transformation and Integration in the Twenty-First Century (edited with Alexander J. Motyl, and Lilia Shevtsova) (2005)
- Moskva rubezha XIX i XX stoletii. Vzgliad v proshloe izdaleka (edited with Pavel Ilyin 2004).
- Netradytsiini immihranti u Kievi (edited with Olena Brachevskaya, Glina Volosiuk, Olena Malynovs'ka, Yaroslav Pilynsky, and Nancy Popson,) (2003)
- Composing Urban History and the Constitution of Civic Identities (edited with John J. Czaplicka with the assistance of Lauren Crabtree) (2003).
- Fragmented Space in the Russian Federation (edited with Jodi Koehn and Nancy E. Popson) (2002).
- Preparing for the Urban Future: Global Pressures and Local Forces (edited with Michael A. Cohen, Joseph S. Tulchin, and Allison M. Garland) (1996)
- Russian Housing in the Modern Age: Design and Social History (edited with William Craft Brumfield) (1993)
- A Scholar's Guide to Humanities and Social Sciences in the Soviet Successor States: The Academies of Sciences of Russia, Armenia, Azerbaidzhan, Belarus, Estonia, Georgia, Kazakhstan, Latvia, Lithuania, Moldova, Tadzhikistan, Turkmenistan, Ukraine, and Uzbekistan, Second Edition (edited with Mark H. Teeter, Robert Mdivani, Viktor Pliushchev, Blair A. Ruble, Lev Skvortsov, Wesley Fisher)(1986)
- Trade Unions in Communist States (edited with Alex Pravda) (1986)
- A Scholar's Guide to Humanities and Social Sciences in the Soviet Union: Academy of Sciences of the USSR and the Academies of Sciences of the Union Republics (edited with Blair A. Ruble and Mark Teeter, compiled by Robert Mdivani, Viktor Pliushchev and Vadim Milshtein with the assistance of Viktor Cherviakov and Valerii Osinov) (1985).
- Industrial Labor in the USSR (edited With Arcadius Kahan) (1979)
