= Population, health, and the environment =

Population, health, and the environment (PHE) is an approach to human development that integrates family planning and health with conservation efforts to seek synergistic successes for greater conservation and human welfare outcomes than single sector approaches. There is a deep relationship between population, health and environment. Those subjects are not only related to each other but also to other important aspects that are very necessary for keeping PHE in a close-knit relationship.

== Why PHE? ==
More than 1 billion people live in ecological hotspots, many of which are remote areas of critically important biodiversity under intense pressure from human activity. Conservation work is usually located in these remote areas to protect the remaining biodiversity. In the developing world, the communities in these remote areas often suffer from ill health because of limited access to health services or family planning. These communities also tends to suffer from poor nutrition, water supplies or sanitation. Inadequate health care in these communities is usually because of economic struggles. Livelihoods in the rural communities depends on natural resources and small-scale agriculture, which can force people to use natural resources unsustainably because of pressure such as rapid population growth or health issues. This can be damaging to ecosystems and the biodiversity in these rural areas.

Conversely, people's health relies on the health of their environment. Their surrounding ecosystem provides them with goods and services such as water, food, medicine, fuel wood, building materials, and other resources. Damage or disruption of these natural goods and services can have severe consequences for human health.

Projects that take the PHE approach work to create healthier communities and ecosystems. These projects aim to bring better health services to remote communities to improve participation in conservation efforts. PHE projects also promote family planning services to help slow population growth that can put pressure on natural resources. That means PHE approaches strive to simultaneously improve access to health services while helping communities manage their natural resources in ways that improve their health and livelihood even as they protect the environment. Beyond this, the PHE approach also targets synergies between human health and ecosystem health by including a wide spectrum of development and conservation targets such as the sustainable management of natural resources, improving livelihoods, food security and nutrition, and by maintaining or restoring habitats and ecosystem functions. By focusing on the synergy between communities and their environment, the PHE approach conserves biodiversity while at the same time improving environmental health conditions for the local people. PHE is effective at achieving a wide range of positive results over multiple sectors.

== History of PHE ==
In the late 1980s conservation organizations and practitioners began to realize the benefits of improving the quality of life for people by managing biodiversity and natural resources. These projects were initially called integrated conservation and development projects (ICDP) and addressed a wide variety of community development needs. At the end of the 1990s it was realized that ICDPs were not achieving conservation or development goals as successfully as anticipated. This was because the scope of ICDPs was often too broad. One of the lessons learned from ICDP attempts was that the success of the projects depended on the ability to focus on key interventions and avoid excessive complexity. From the lessons learned from early ICDPs the conservation sector gave birth to the PHE approach with a new generation of integrated projects.

Program designers began to realize that efforts to conserve biological diversity (biodiversity) in developing countries were most successful in long-term indicators when local people perceived their efforts as serving their economic and cultural interests. This gave birth to the integrated development approach. To achieve success it was found that ICDPs had to consider the linkage between conservation and development objectives in every unique place that the project was implemented. The first step to determining the linkages is to consider where the conservation and economic development goals intersect. Development interventions should then be introduced where this intersection occurs.

One of the most important lessons learned from ICDPs in the last 20 years was the failure to equitably involve projected beneficiaries as partners in all phases of project implementation, from design through evaluation, has led to consistently disappointing project results. It must be recognized that local participants are not a homogenous group of community members but differ widely in terms of access and dependency of resources, economic positions and their sensitivity to environmental changes. Lessons learned from past ICDPs have led the design of the stakeholder analysis where individuals or groups vested in the project are identified and incorporated into all stages of project design and implementation.

Drawing on what was learned from ICDPs, the conservation sector piloted the PHE approach during the 1990s with the first generation of PHE integrated projects. Since then USAID (the United States Agency for International Development), the David and Lucile Packard Foundation, Johnson & Johnson, and the Summit Foundation have worked to strengthen the approach. The PHE approach has pushed on with the United Nations Millennium Development Goals (MDG) in mind. As the PHE approach advances it has demonstrated to have the kind of synergies needed to reach these goals.

== Past PHE Project Profiles ==
Successful Communities from Ridge to Reef, Kenya: This project was implemented in an area designated a UNESCO reserve in the Kiunga National Marine Reserve. The reserve has outstanding marine biodiversity of over 11,000 species, 60-70% of which are endemic to the Indo-Pacific Ocean. The World Wildlife Fund (WWF) with funding from USAID, was able to provide communities that depend on the reserve's resources access to family planning through a mobile clinic. Members of the community began to actively participate in conservation activities once they knew WWF was willing to help them meet basic health needs.

Healthy Families, Health Forests, Cambodia: When refugees from the Cambodia/Vietnam war in the 1970s returned home, they found their land had been destroyed through logging and agriculture. With USAID support, Conservation International helped the Khmer Daeum refugees to replenish their land and supplied the refugees with their first-ever access to family planning. Healthy families were able to develop long-term plans for sustainable land use and local women created associations that mobilized the community to increase income earning opportunities and strengthen participation in conservation activities.

Integrated Population and Coastal Resource Management (IPOPCORM), Philippines Rapid population growth in the Philippines has led to deforestation and destruction of coral reefs. Only 3% of original forest cover remains and only 5% of coral reefs are intact and in pristine condition. This uncontrollable population growth, coupled with the depletion of coastal resources led to the development of the Integrated Population and Coastal Resource Management (IPOPCORM) project with support from USAID and PATH Foundation Philippines Inc. The IPOPCORM Project focuses on communities in the Philippines' most endangered coastal reef areas and works to improve food security and livelihoods by promoting family planning and sustainable fisheries management. The program has earned strong support from local mayors and community members who have appreciated IPOPCORM's focus on improving livelihoods.

Population and Resource Management in Madagascar Africa's greatest concentration of unique plant and animal species can be found in Madagascar. These species have been historically threatened by rapid population growth leading to deforestation. USAID/Madagascar planned for the development of an innovative population and environment program in the region that linked community-based natural resource management with interventions to improve family health and planning while allowing for better preservation of the island's unique biodiversity. The program had worked with local communities in order to support family planning services, sustainable agriculture, good governance, improved food production, alternative livelihoods, and environmental education.

Community-Centered Conservation Efforts in Tanzania The Jane Goodall Institute, with funding from USAID/Tanzania, constructed the TACARE project to eliminate poverty and support sustainable livelihoods, while alleviating the depletion of natural resources in the country. The community-based approach aimed to improve the livelihoods in Tanzanian communities while promoting conservation and an understanding of the need to preserve biodiversity. This approach provides family planning methods, information, and counseling by community volunteers that has resulted in a greater acceptance of family planning. With funding from USAID/Washington the TACARE approach is being replicated in the Democratic Republic of Congo.

Andean Highlands of Ecuador A collaborative operations research effort by CEMOPLAF, World Neighbors, and the University of Michigan's Population-Environment Fellows Program was supported by USAID. The study showed quantified benefits of integrating family planning efforts and information with agriculture and natural resource management in the area.

"Conservation Through Public Health" With funding from USAID, Conservation Through Public Health, a Ugandan-based NGO and US registered non-profit added family planning to its integrated One Health program promoting wildlife health and community-based health care to prevent zoonotic disease transmission between people, wildlife and livestock. CTPH has received recognition for having a model PHE program promoting gorilla conservation and community health and development in and around Bwindi Impenetrable National Park, SW Uganda.

== Critiques of PHE ==
Some PHE strategies are increasingly called into question as social and reproductive justice are integrated into conservation. Several reports show that conservation organizations do not provide holistic reproductive care to families, instead focusing narrowly on birth control. In some areas organizations pressure women in poor communities to take birth control and undergo sterilization. In India, 13 women died at a sterilization camp in Chhattisgarh in 2014 due to unsafe operating conditions. The restriction and denial of birth control access in the U.S. makes PHE and forced birth control on communities in the Global South even more ironic. Fears of overpopulation and resource scarcity have allowed wealthy nations to wrongly blame the Global South for environmental degradation through unrestricted population growth. Supposed 'solutions' from the Global North involve top-down regulations that harm poor communities and minorities, such as coerced sterilization. These reproductive injustices against poor communities have drawn criticism from both feminists and environmentalists globally.

== See also ==
- List of population concern organizations

== Resources ==
- Oglethorpe, J.; Honzak, C.; Margoluis, C.,Healthy People, Healthy Ecosystems: A Manual on Integrating Health and Family Planning into Conservation Projects, World Wildlife Fund (WWF), 2008
- Brown, Michael and Barbara Wyckoff-Baird. Designing Integrated Conservation and Development Projects, The Biodiversity Support Program, November 1992
