= Jean Stead =

Jean Bourne (30 May 1926 – 2 December 2016) was a British journalist.

== Early life and education ==
Jean Bourne nee Stead was born in Huddersfield, Yorkshire, 30 May 1926.

== Career ==
Stead trained as a reporter on The Yorkshire Post, working as a reporter for 10 years in Leeds and London. In 1963, she joined The Guardian as a reporter, specialising in writing about housing and the homeless, immigration and race relations, and occasionally a columnist on the women's page. In 1968, she became a deputy to news editor John Cole, then succeeded him as news editor from 1970 until 1979. Stead was later appointed Special Projects Editor, supervising investigative reporting, book serialisation, and specialist columns, such as those concerning legal affairs and motorcycling. She became known for her international correspondence covering the motorcycle Grand Prix in Europe.

Stead also wrote extensively about the nuclear disarmament movement in Europe, particularly in Germany, at the height of the Cold War. She was threatened with arrest, and her exit visa was taken from her after she interviewed dissident writers under house arrest in the Soviet Union, while covering a Scandinavian women's peace march across the Soviet Union. Stead wrote the first articles about the Greenham Common Women's Peace Camp protest against the siting of American Cruise missiles at the base, and its significance for feminism.

From 1983-88, she was The Guardian's Scotland correspondent, covering the national miners' strike, the Ravenscraig steelworks and shipbuilding on the Clyde, as well as Scottish politics and the nationalist movement. From this work she published in 1986 the book, Never the Same Again, an account of women's involvement in the miners' strike.

After her retirement in 1988, Stead returned for a short time as archaeology correspondent after archaeologists protested at the burial of the Rose Theatre site and the original Shakespeare Globe Theatre. She also wrote a number of articles about major discoveries nationally and internationally, including at the site of the Berlin Wall. Stead edited the current affairs journal, The New Reporter, from 1994 to 1995, designed by her husband, John Bourne.

In 2006, she was one of the organisers of a 25th anniversary exhibition of the Greenham Common women's protest. Stead was the UK co-ordinator for Grandmothers for Peace International, based in Elk Grove, California, which opposes nuclear weapons, and led protests against the Iraq War. She served as an adviser to UKLAW, a committee to help Afghan women which was established by Joan Ruddock.

== Personal life ==
Stead was married for nearly 60 years to John Bourne, a journalist. They had two children and three grandchildren, and lived in London and Cornwall.

She died on 2 December 2016 at the age of 90.
