= Scholastica Kimaryo =

Tanzanian journalist and international civil servant

- Born: 1949 (age 76–77); Maua, Kilimanjaro Region, Tanzania
- Other name: Scholastica Sylvan Kimaryo
- Occupations: Journalist, civil servant and development facilitator
- Years active: 1969–present

Scholastica Kimaryo (born 1949) is a Tanzanian life coach and women's rights advocate, who formerly worked as an international civil servant and journalist for three decades. Born in the Kilimanjaro Region of Tanzania, she fought against tradition to earn her secondary and tertiary education. After attending the Girls' High School in Tabora, in 1971 she earned a Bachelor of Science in home economics through a cooperative arrangement with Victoria University of Manchester and the University of East Africa, of Nairobi. She worked as a journalist and earned a post-graduate diploma in journalism from the University of Dar es Salaam, in a programme sponsored by the government-owned Tanganyika Standard.

After nearly a decade in journalism, Kimyaro began working with the United Nations International Children's Emergency Fund (UNICEF) holding posts as the National Programme Officer in Tanzania (1981–1984), Botswana (1984–1990), South Africa (1992–1998), and Liberia (1998–2001). During her tenure, she worked on projects to improve and develop schools, introduce peace initiatives, protect children's rights, and eliminate poverty. In the 1990s, she also returned to her studies, earning a Master of Science degree in Social Policy, Planning & Participation in Developing Countries from the London School of Economics. After more than two decades with UNICEF, Kimaryo was promoted to serve in the United Nations Development Programme (UNDP) as the UN Resident Coordinator and UNDP Representative to Lesotho (2001–2005) and then to South Africa (2005–2007). Her work there focused on developing protocols for the response to the HIV/AIDS crisis in Africa and poverty and unemployment reduction. In 2008 and 2009, she served as the first person to be the UNDP Deputy Assistant Administrator and Deputy Regional Director for East & Southern Africa, with responsibility for overseeing UN operations in 23 African nations. After retiring in 2009, Kimaryo earned a certification from the Chopra Center University, as a meditation instructor and ayurvedic lifestyle coach. She has remained active in women's organisations and as a speaker on finding a balance between personal well-being and work/life commitments.

== Early life, education, and family ==
Scholastica was born in 1949 in Maua, a village near Kibosho Kati in the Kilimanjaro Region of Tanzania. There were six siblings in her family, three brothers and three sisters. She completed primary education through Standard 4 and wanted to continue her schooling, but education was not typical for girls from her village. Her father opposed her desire for higher education, and instead wanted her to marry. Her mother, Maria Yosepha Laurenti, encouraged Scholasica and a local priest intervened to help her enroll in a local missionary school for Standard 5. (Note: Until 1966 in urban areas and 1973 nationally, when the Standard 4 examination was eliminated, most students in Tanzania did not attend primary school beyond Standard 4 and secondary school was typically limited to elite Africans.) Her mother and oldest sister, Cecilia, worked to pay for her schooling at the Girls' High School in Tabora. In 1969, Scholastica enrolled at the University of East Africa in Nairobi, Kenya. While studying, she began to work as a journalist, writing articles for newspapers such as Uhuru, Mzalendo, and The Nationalist. Through a cooperative arrangement with Victoria University of Manchester, she earned a Bachelor of Science in home economics from the University of East Africa in 1971. After earning her degree, she completed a post-graduate course at the University of Dar es Salaam with a diploma in journalism in a programme sponsored by the government-owned Tanganyika Standard.

In the early 1970s, Scholastica married Sylvan Joachim Kimaryo, a guitarist and musician who owned several bands, with whom she had two children, Joachim Marunda Kimaryo, who became a musician known as Master Jay, and Catherine Kimaryo, who followed her mother into development work. Kimaryo continued to work as a journalist, writing for the Daily News and became secretary general of the Tanzania Journalists' Association. As she was able to help her parents financially and provide electricity and educational materials to her native village from her work in journalism, Kimaryo's father changed his mind about educating girls and became an advocate for girls' schooling. In 1974, Scholastica was one of twelve African women from Ghana, Nigeria, South Africa, Tanzania and Uganda to tour seven US cities with the women's organisation Grail. The purpose of the visit was to explore networking opportunities and expertise in health, education, and community development aimed at changing the social status of women. She was assigned in 1977 to interview Alex Tosh, head representative of United Nations International Children's Emergency Fund (UNICEF) in Tanzania for a story on preparations for the 1979 International Year of the Child. The interview led to her being offered a post with UNICEF.

== International civil servant (1978–2009) ==
=== UNICEF ===
In 1978, Kimaryo became the executive secretary of the Tanzanian Commission for Children, a project that was funded by UNICEF. The following year she was hired by UNICEF, and worked on various projects to improve children's lives. Advancing through the ranks, she became UNICEF's National Programme Officer for Tanzania in 1981, serving for three years. Her role required procuring resources for building schools and health facilities to assist children and women agricultural workers. A specific goal in Tanzania was to focus on reducing child mortality rates. In 1984, she transferred to Botswana as the National Programme Officer for UNICEF and moved to Gaborone. Kimaryo attended the 1985 World Conference on Women, held in Nairobi, as a delegate of the International Center for Research on Women. She spoke during the forum sessions on the difficulties women faced in implementing their development projects in Africa. After two years as programme officer, Kimaryo was promoted to the Assistant UNICEF Representative for Botswana, a post she held until 1990. Much of her work in Botswana dealt with issues facing agricultural communities.

Her work in development made Kimyaro aware that there was a disconnect between delivering services and policy, which led her to return to her studies in 1990. She attended the London School of Economics, earning a Master of Science degree in Social Policy, Planning & Participation in Developing Countries in 1991. Upon completing her studies, Kimyaro began working as the senior programme officer for UNICEF in South Africa. At the time South Africa was beginning the transition from Apartheid to a full democracy. Her work focused on supporting work on redrafting the constitution in order to ensure that human rights and the rights of children were incorporated into the new structures and policies of governance. The politician Hlengiwe Mkhize stated that children's development as a focal area was introduced to South Africa by Kimyaro during her tenure. Key programmes included immunisation, emergency food deliveries, peace education in schools, and provisions to protect children from war crimes and violence. To help fund the programmes, Kimyaro organised a visit by Katharine, Duchess of Kent, whose tour raised $5 million. In 1998, Kimyaro transferred with UNICEF to Liberia, where the First Liberian Civil War had ended the year before. Within a year of her posting, the country erupted again into conflict. In Liberia, Kimyaro's work focused on education and barriers, such as cultural traditions and poverty, preventing students from completing schooling. Another significant focus was on trying to help those who had served as child soldiers to overcome their trauma and rebuild their lives by learning trades. To implement projects, her work there often focused on fundraising. She arranged a tour for Tetsuko Kuroyanagi, which raised $1 million for the country's programmes.

=== United Nations Development Programme ===
After over two decades of working for UNICEF, Kimyaro was promoted to work for the United Nations Development Programme (UNDP) in 2001. Her first assignment was as the UN Resident Coordinator and UNDP Representative to Lesotho. At the time one of the most critical issues facing Sub-Saharan Africa was the HIV/AIDS epidemic and the UNDP took the lead in formulating initiatives to address the crisis. Two of these focused on involving leaders as volunteers for testing at community gatherings in order to demonstrate that HIV tests were simple and not to be feared, and to use local governments rather than national mechanisms for prioritising and implementing initiatives. Kimyaro led the team that produced a book, Turning a Crisis into an Opportunity: Strategies for Scaling up the National Response to the HIV/AIDS Pandemic in Lesotho, which professor Courtenay Sprague describes as a manual to prevent people who are uninfected from becoming infected and to assure that those who have the virus receive proper care and treatment. Sprague lauded the innovations the book proposed and the fact that it was written by Africans, but stated that its shortcomings concerned a lack of discussion on ways to finance treatment and implement strategies, because the cost was typically not affordable to people in the country, and whether the national laws and policies were in-line with the proposed goals.

Between 2005 and 2007, Kimyaro returned to South Africa, where she served as UN Resident Coordinator and UNDP Representative. She helped create a plan with a budget of R550 million to assist the government in meeting targets for national goals and priorities. In developing the plan, seventeen government departments were consulted to gain alignment of their objectives to reduce poverty and unemployment. Key focus areas of the strategy included economic development, governance and administration, international relationships, crime prevention and judicial oversight, and peace and security measures. Each sector was assigned a target budget for achieving initiatives with the appropriate UN agency responsible for fundraising. She was promoted to UNDP Deputy Assistant Administrator and Deputy Regional Director for East & Southern Africa in 2008. The post was newly created when she took office and required Kimaryo to oversee UN operations in 23 African countries. She served until she reached mandatory retirement from the UN at age 60 in 2009.

== Later career (2009–present) ==
When she retired in 2009, Kimaryo returned to study, earning certification as a meditation instructor and ayurvedic lifestyle coach from the Chopra Center University. She participated in and was a speaker at numerous women's conferences over the following years, and participated in the activities of Tanzanian Women in Gauteng (TWIGA), a women's organisation she had founded in the early 2000s to allow Tanzanian women living in South Africa to build networking opportunities. Conferences included the 2010 Gender Justice and Local Government Summits held in Johannesburg in 2010, 2011, and 2012. The summits were organised by Gender Links, an organisation in which Kimaryo served as deputy chair, and aimed to create dialogue between men and women in how gender equality could be attained. She spoke at the Rwanda Women Leaders Network conference in 2015 on developing women's leadership and mentoring skills to give them more opportunities and prevent unemployment. In 2017, Kimaryo founded Maadili Leadership Solutions to promote development of healthy habits for mind and body. She continues to speak at conferences such as the 2019 Pan Africa Women CEO Forum, and the 2020 Woman of Influence Empowerment Conference, both held in Dar es Salaam. Her message is to encourage women to balance their own well-being with their work and life obligations.

== Selected works ==
- Tuluhungwa, R.R.N.; Kimaryo, S.S. (1978). Popular Participation and Basic Services: Tanzania Experience. Nairobi, Kenya: UNICEF. OCLC 7282590.
- Kimaryo, Scholastica (1983). Women and Reproduction: The Tanzanian Experience. Dar es Salaam, Tanzania: UNICEF. OCLC 428102948.
- Hilsum, Lindsey (1993). Kimyaro, S.S. (ed.). The State of South Africa's Children: An Agenda for Action. Johannesburg, South Africa: UNICEF. ISBN 978-0-620-17695-8.
- Kimaryo, Scholastica Sylvan; Githuku-Shongwe, Anne; Okpaku, Joseph O.; Feeney, Joseph, eds. (2004). Turning a Crisis into an Opportunity: Strategies for Scaling Up the National Response to the HIV/AIDS Pandemic in Lesotho. New Rochelle, New York: Third Press Publishers. ISBN 978-0-89388-236-5.
