= Anti-nuclear movement in the United Kingdom =

Groups in the United Kingdom that oppose nuclear power and nuclear weapons

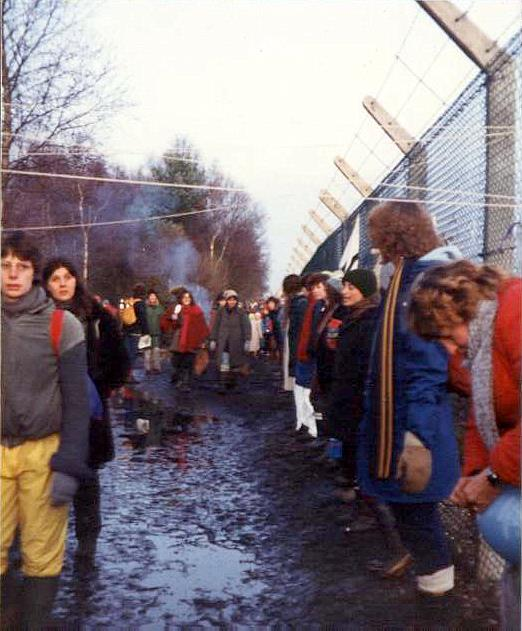
On 12 December 1982, 30,000 women held hands around the 6 miles (9.7 km) perimeter of the RAF Greenham Common base, in protest against the decision to site American cruise missiles there.

The anti-nuclear movement in the United Kingdom consists of groups who oppose nuclear technologies such as nuclear power and nuclear weapons. Many different groups and individuals have been involved in anti-nuclear demonstrations and protests over the years.

One of the most prominent anti-nuclear groups in the UK is the Campaign for Nuclear Disarmament (CND). CND's Aldermaston Marches began in 1958 and continued into the late 1960s when tens of thousands of people took part in the four-day marches. One significant anti-nuclear mobilisation in the 1980s was the Greenham Common Women's Peace Camp. In London, in October 1983, more than 300,000 people assembled in Hyde Park as part of the largest protest against nuclear weapons in British history. In 2005 in Britain, there were many protests and peace camps about the government's proposal to replace the ageing Trident weapons system with a newer model.

In October 2010 the British government announced eight locations it considered suitable for future nuclear power stations. This has resulted in public opposition and protests at some of the sites. The Scottish Government, with the backing of the Scottish Parliament, has stated that no new nuclear power stations will be constructed in Scotland. In March 2012, RWE npower and E.ON announced they would be pulling out of developing new nuclear power plants. Analysts said the decision meant the future of UK nuclear power could now be in doubt.

== Context ==
There are large variations in peoples' understanding of the issues surrounding nuclear power, including the technology itself, climate change, and energy security. There is a wide spectrum of views and concerns over nuclear power and it remains a controversial area of public policy. As of 2024, nuclear power provided around 14% of the UK's electricity.

The UK also has nuclear weapons in the form of Trident missiles which are located on a fleet of submarines, and the funding and deployment of these weapons has also been widely debated.

The 1976 Flower's Report on Nuclear Power and the Environment recommended that:

There should be no commitment to a large programme of nuclear fission power until it has been demonstrated beyond reasonable doubt that a method exists to ensure the safe containment of longlived, highly radioactive waste for the indefinite future.

On 18 October 2010 the British government announced eight locations it considered suitable for future nuclear power stations. This has resulted in public opposition and protests at some of the sites. In March 2012, two of the big six power companies announced they would be pulling out of developing new nuclear power plants. The decision by RWE npower and E.ON follows uncertainty over nuclear energy following the Fukushima nuclear disaster last year. The companies will not proceed with their Horizon project, which was to develop nuclear reactors at Wylfa in North Wales and at Oldbury-on-Severn in Gloucestershire. Their decision follows a similar announcement by Scottish and Southern Electricity last year. Analysts said the decision meant the future of UK nuclear power could now be in doubt.

In May 2012, a new government report showed that, in England and Wales, hundreds of sites could be contaminated with radioactive waste from old military bases, factories, and old planes. This figure is far higher than previous official estimates.

== Anti-nuclear protests ==
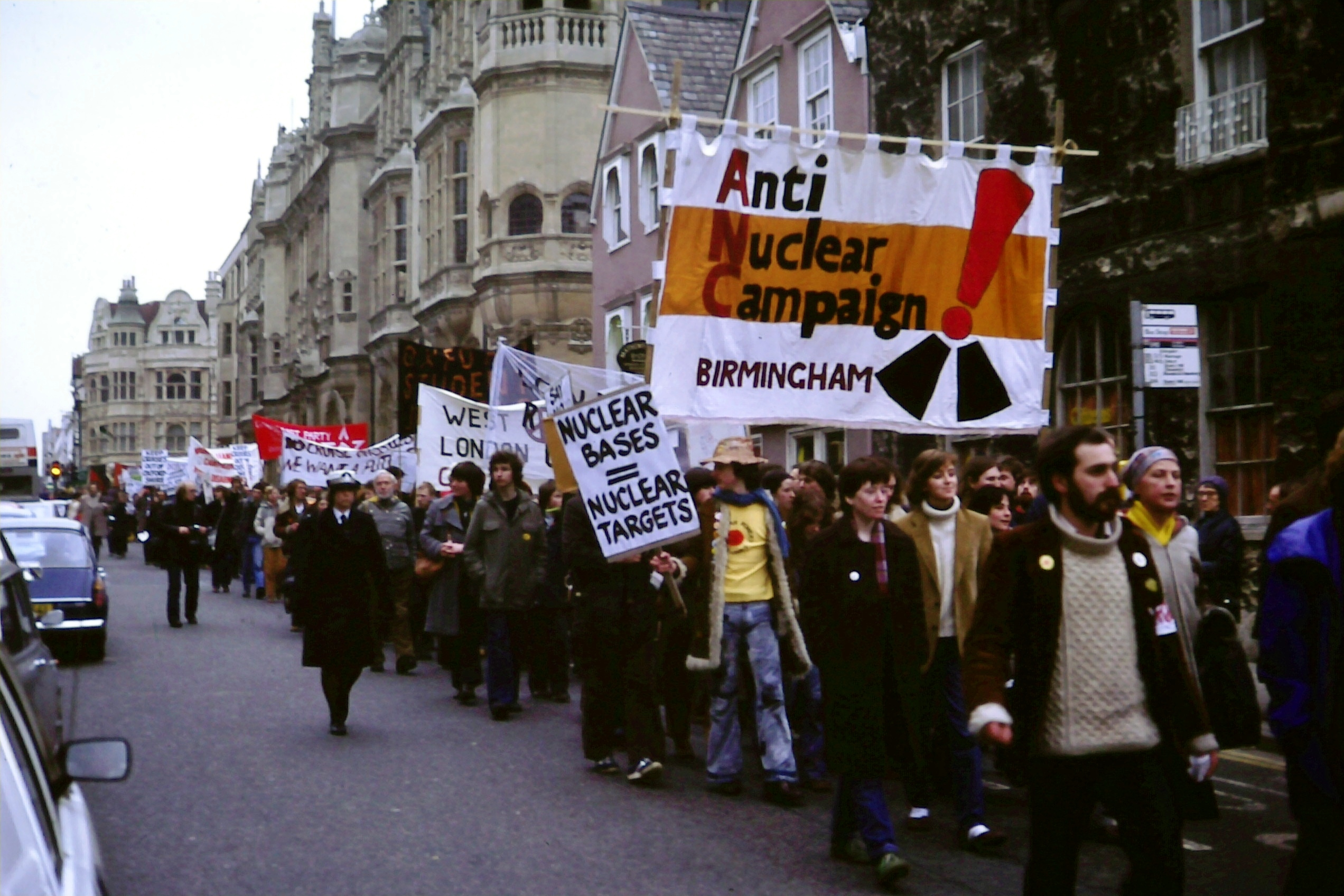
Anti-nuclear weapons protest march in Oxford, 1980

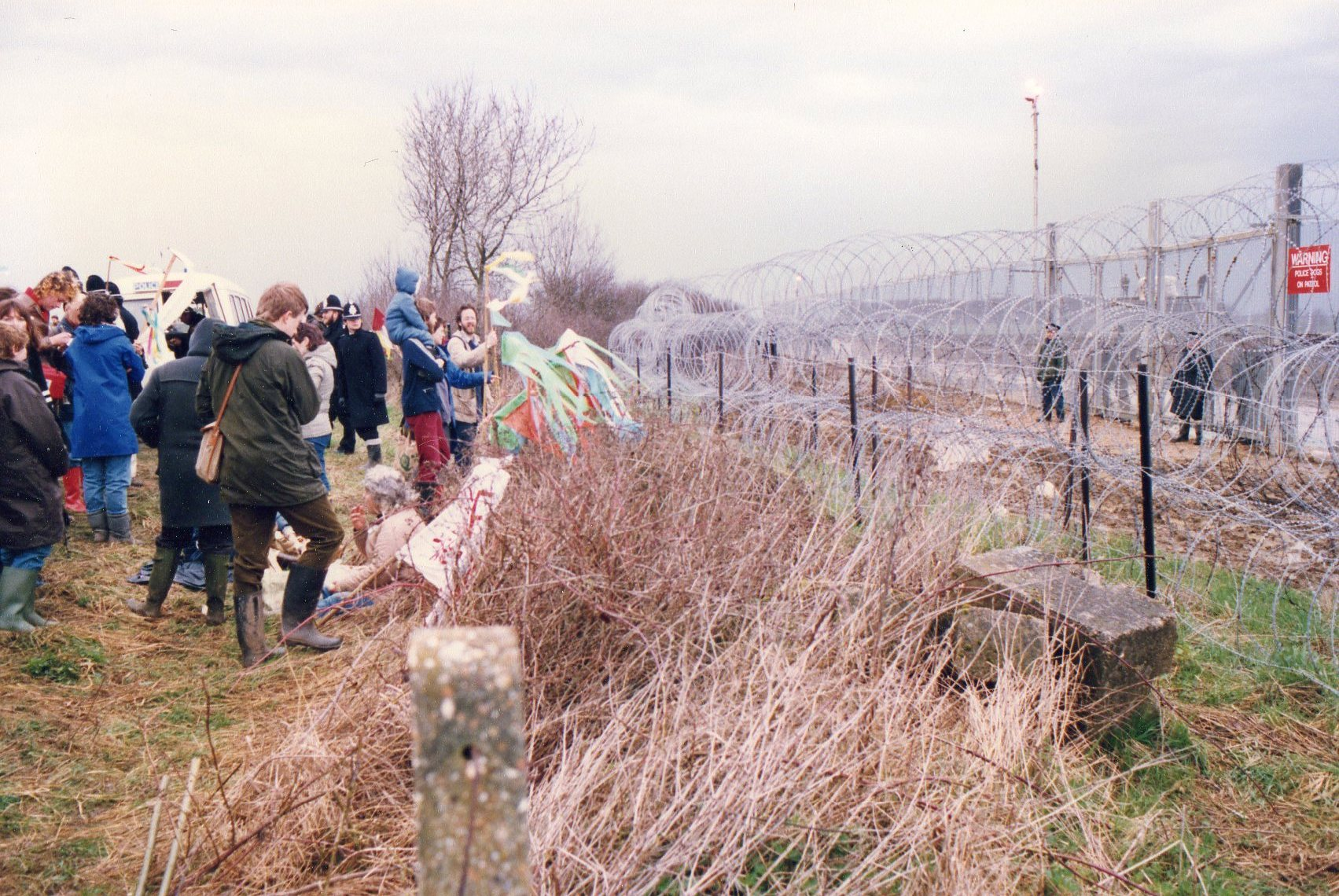
Demonstrators outside the wire fences at Molesworth, early 1980s

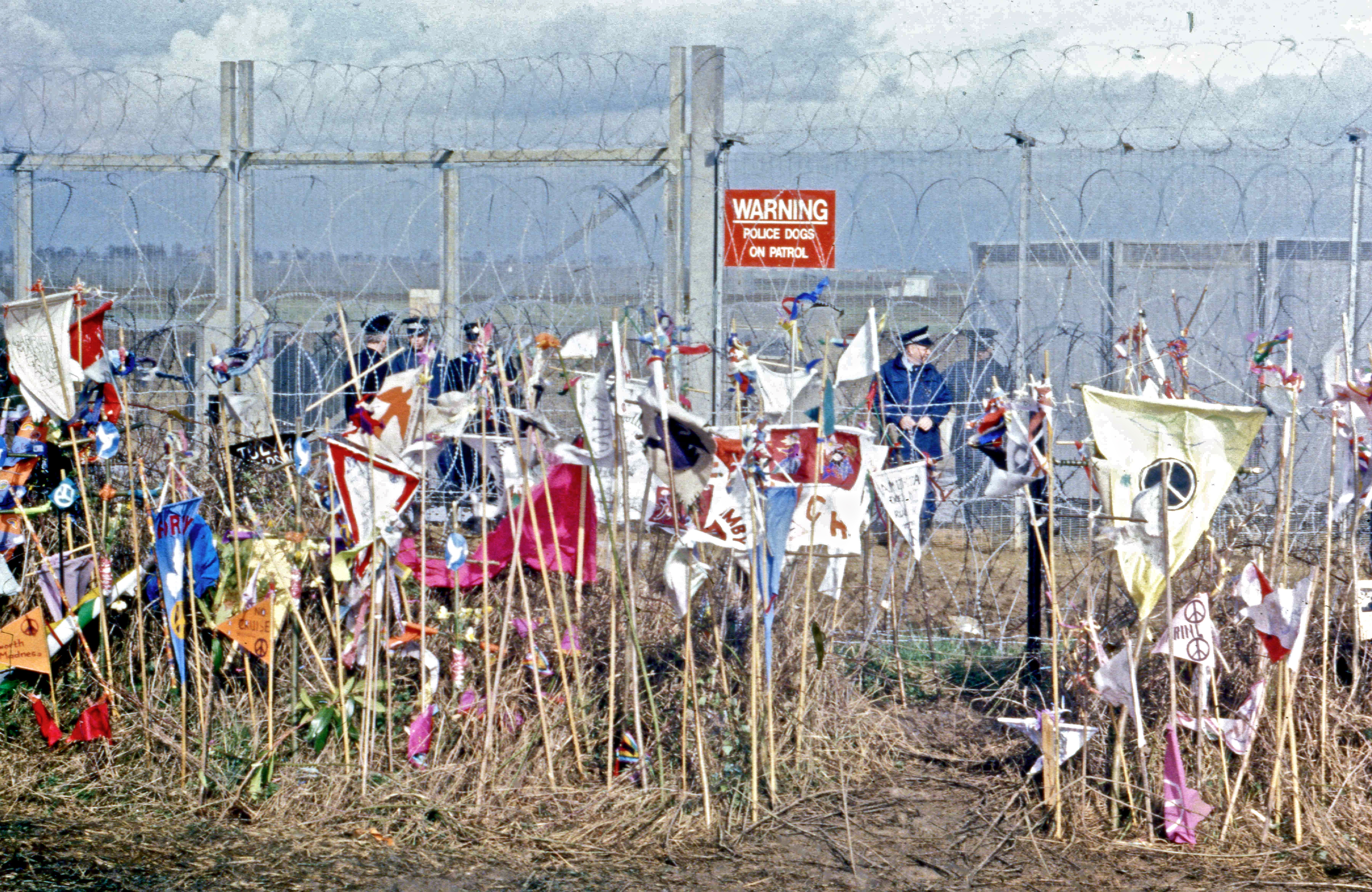
8 April 1985, CND placards against the RAF Molesworth fence

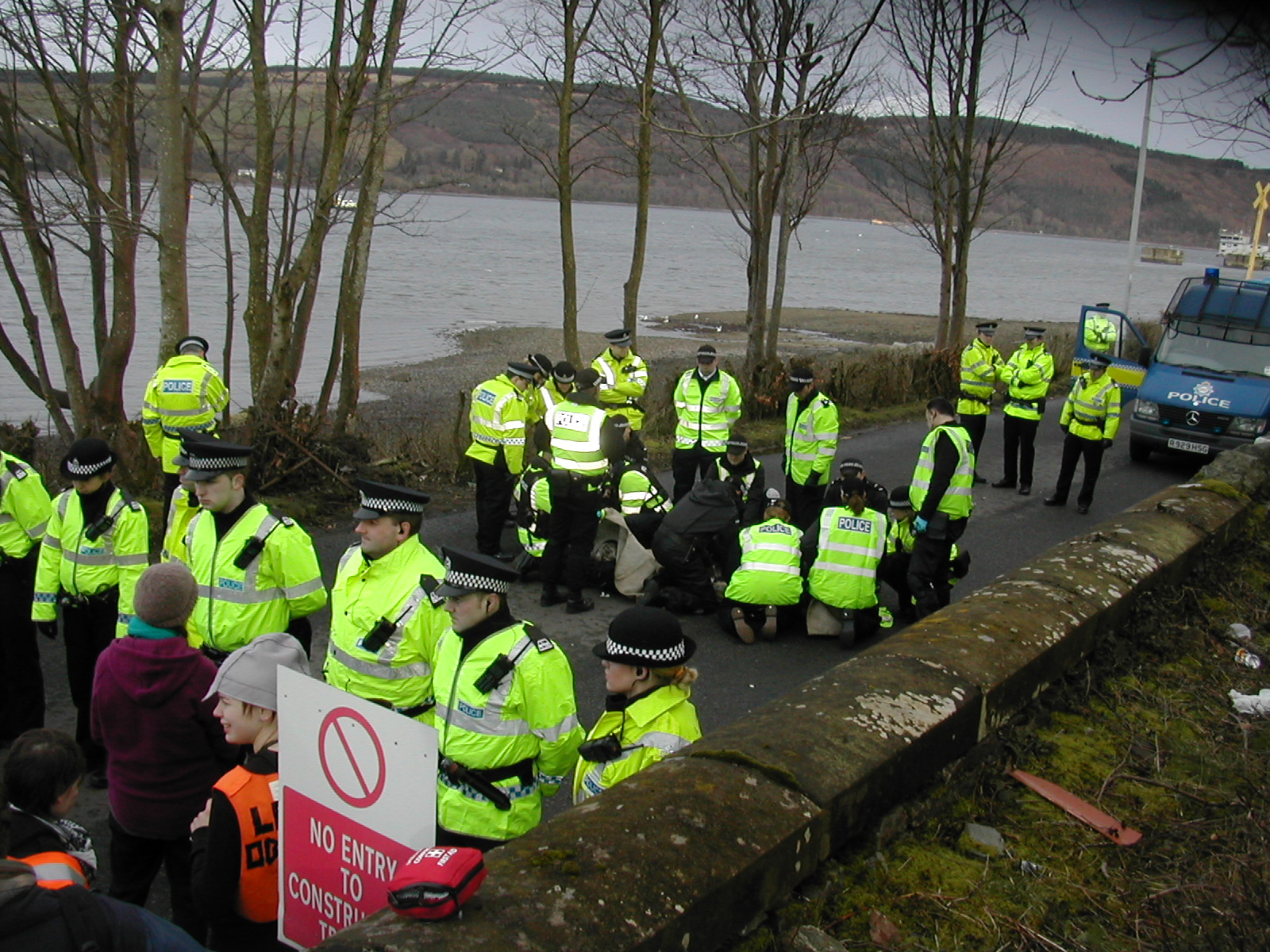
Police dismantling a blockade of protestors at the south gate of the Faslane naval base

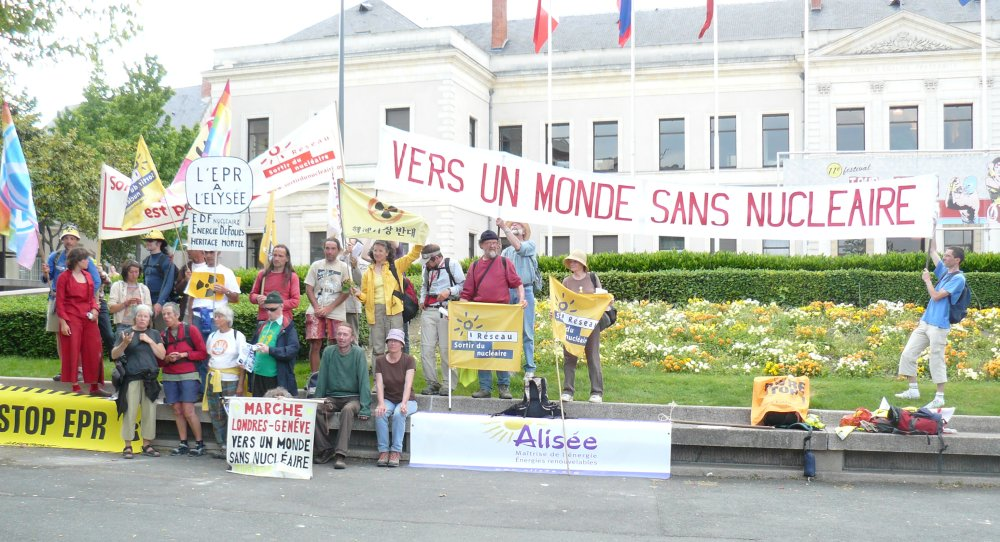
Anti-nuclear march from London to Geneva, 2008

The first Aldermaston March organised by the Campaign for Nuclear Disarmament took place at Easter 1958, when several thousand people marched for four days from Trafalgar Square, London, to the Atomic Weapons Research Establishment close to Aldermaston in Berkshire, England, to demonstrate their opposition to nuclear weapons. The Aldermaston marches continued into the late 1960s when tens of thousands of people took part in the four-day marches.

One significant anti-nuclear mobilisation in the 1980s was the Greenham Common Women's Peace Camp. It began in September 1981 after a Welsh group called "Women for Life on Earth" arrived at Greenham to protest against the decision of the Government to allow cruise missiles to be based there. The women's peace camp attracted significant media attention and "prompted the creation of other peace camps at more than a dozen sites in Britain and elsewhere in Europe". In December 1982 some 30,000 women from various peace camps and other peace organisations held a major protest against nuclear weapons on Greenham Common.

On 1 April 1983, about 70,000 people linked arms to form a human chain between three nuclear weapons centres in Berkshire. The anti-nuclear demonstration stretched for 14 miles along the Kennet Valley.

In London, in October 1983, more than 300,000 people assembled in Hyde Park. This was "the largest protest against nuclear weapons in British history", according to the New York Times.

Molesworth peace camp was set up outside RAF Molesworth, which was the focus of large protests at Easter 1985 and February 1986, during one of which Bruce Kent, one of the leaders of the Campaign for Nuclear Disarmament, attempted to cut through the fence in full view of the police. A protest presence remained outside the station well into the 1990s recording the movement of cruise missiles.

Faslane Naval Base has nuclear capable missiles and is part of the HM Naval Base Clyde in Scotland. Faslane has attracted demonstrations by Campaign for Nuclear Disarmament and Trident Ploughshares. Faslane Peace Camp is a permanent peace camp outside the base gates, and there are frequent demonstrations at the base gates. The Scottish National Party, the Scottish Socialist Party and the Scottish Green Party all oppose the deployment of nuclear weapons, and it is not unusual for members of these parties to be present at rallies outside Faslane. Such events aim to keep the base closed for as long as possible by preventing its staff from arriving for work, and usually involve large numbers of protesters being arrested for non-violent civil disobedience. The Radical Independence Campaign political organisation also opposes nuclear weapons and the Trident nuclear weapons programme.

Other peace camps were set up at the same time at Naphill, Daws Hill, Upper Heyford, and Lakenheath though none lasted more than a few years.

In 2005 in Britain, there were many protests about the government's proposal to replace the ageing Trident weapons system with a newer model. The largest protest had 100,000 participants and, according to polls, 59 percent of the public opposed the move.

In October 2008 in the United Kingdom, more than 30 people were arrested during one of the largest anti-nuclear protests at the Atomic Weapons Establishment at Aldermaston for 10 years. The demonstration marked the start of the UN World Disarmament Week and involved about 400 people.

In October 2011, more than 200 protesters blockaded the Hinkley Point C nuclear power station site. Members of several anti-nuclear groups that are part of the Stop New Nuclear alliance barred access to the site in protest at EDF Energy's plans to renew the site with two new reactors.

In January 2012, three hundred anti-nuclear protestors marched against plans to build a new nuclear power station at Wylfa. The march was organised by Pobl Atal Wylfa B, Greenpeace and Cymdeithas yr Iaith, which are supporting a farmer who is in dispute with Horizon.

In February 2012, protesters set up camp in an abandoned farm on the site of the proposed Hinkley Point C nuclear power station. They are "angry West Somerset Council has given EDF Energy the go-ahead for preparatory work before planning permission has been granted". The group of about seven protesters also claim a nature reserve is at risk from the proposals.

On 10 March 2012, the first anniversary of the Fukushima nuclear disaster, hundreds of anti-nuclear campaigners formed a symbolic chain around Hinkley Point to express their determined opposition to new nuclear power plants, and to call on the coalition government to abandon its plan for seven other new nuclear plants across the UK. Similar protests took place against new nuclear plants at Wylfa in North Wales and Heysham in Lancashire.

In April 2013, thousands of Scottish campaigners, MSPs, and union leaders, rallied against nuclear weapons. The Scrap Trident Coalition wants to see an end to nuclear weapons, and says saved monies should be used for health, education and welfare initiatives. There was also a blockade of the Faslane Naval Base, where Trident missiles are stored.

In June 2025, demonstrators from groups such as Stop Sizewell C and Together Against Sizewell C staged a large rally on Sizewell Beach in Suffolk to oppose the construction of the new Sizewell C nuclear power station. Hundreds of protesters voiced concerns about environmental damage, coastal impact, and the economic priorities of nuclear energy over renewables, and marched to the site’s perimeter to tie symbolic ribbons and deliver speeches.

== Specific groups ==
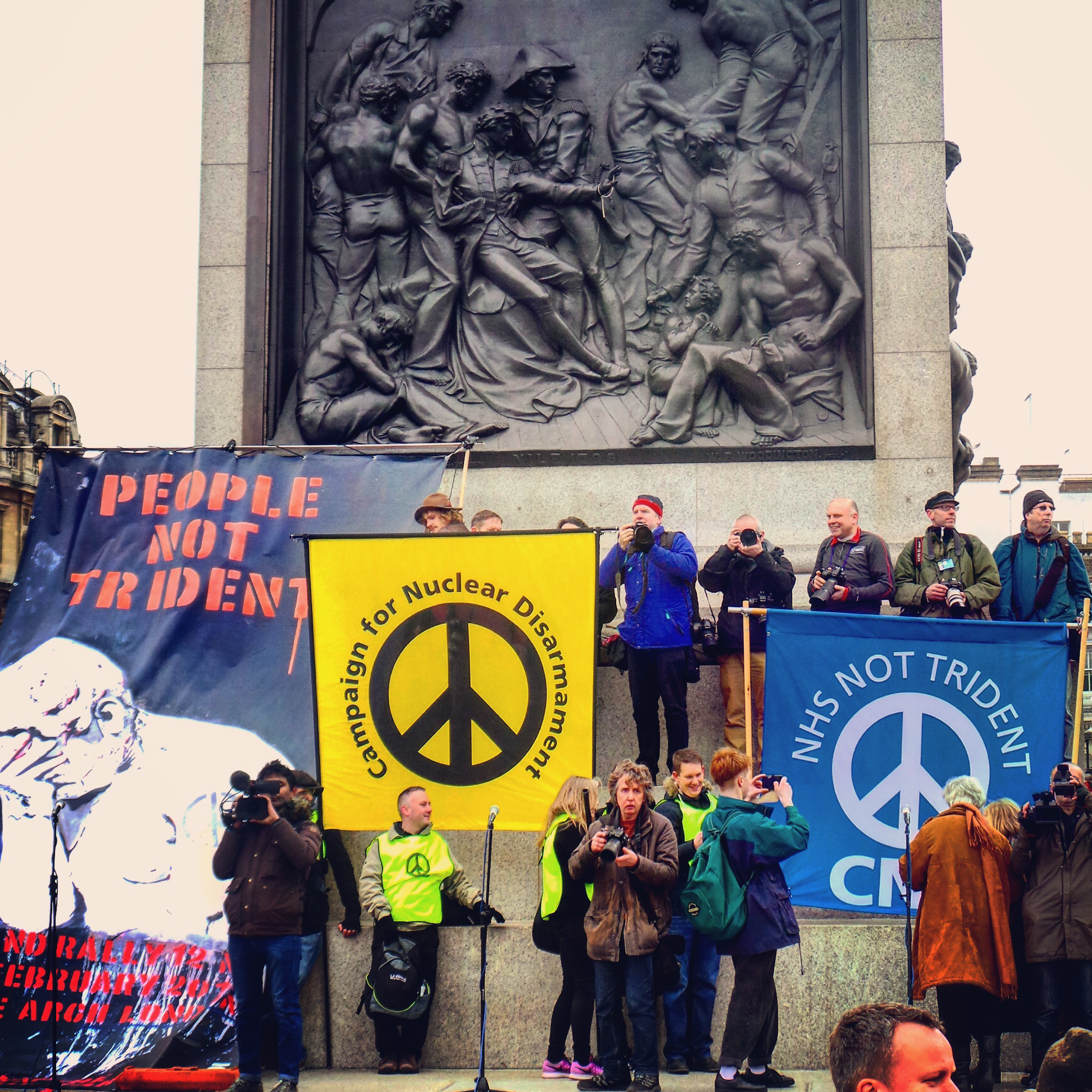
The now-familiar peace symbol was originally the Campaign for Nuclear Disarmament logo.

One of the most prominent anti-nuclear groups in the UK is the Campaign for Nuclear Disarmament (CND). CND favours nuclear disarmament by all countries and tighter international regulation through treaties such as the Nuclear Non-Proliferation Treaty. CND is also opposed to any new nuclear power stations being built in the United Kingdom. One of the activities most strongly associated with CND is the Aldermaston Marches. Other anti-nuclear groups in the UK include:

- Bertrand Russell Peace Foundation
- Campaign Against Nuclear Radiation And Storage
- Christian CND
- Committee of 100 (United Kingdom)
- Cumbrians Opposed to a Radioactive Environment
- Direct Action Committee
- Energy Fair
- Friends of the Earth (EWNI)
- Friends of the Earth Scotland
- Green Party of England and Wales
- Greenpeace
- Labour CND
- Low Level Radiation Campaign
- MEDACT
- No 2 Nuclear Power
- No New Nukes
- Nuclear Information Service
- Nuclear Pledge
- Plaid Cymru (anti-nuclear-weapons and anti-Trident UK nuclear weapons programme)
- Radical Independence Campaign
- Scientists against Nuclear Arms
- SCRAM - Scottish Campaign to Resist the Atomic Menace
- Scottish Campaign for Nuclear Disarmament
- Scottish Greens
- Scottish National Party (anti-nuclear-weapons and anti-Trident UK nuclear weapons programme)
- Seeds of hope
- Shutdown Sizewell Campaign
- Spies for Peace
- Stop Hinkley
- Top Level Group
- Trident Ploughshares
- Wales Anti-Nuclear Alliance
- WWF-UK

== Public opinion ==
=== Nuclear weapons ===
Historically, public support for unilateral nuclear disarmament was at about one in four of the population." Between 1955 and 1962, 19% to 33% of people in Britain expressed disapproval of the manufacture of nuclear weapons. Public support for unilateralism in September 1982 reached 31%. Support for unilateral disarmament fell after the end of the Cold war and even after the collapse of the Soviet Union British nuclear weapons had majority support. Public opinion has continued to move away from disarmament since the start of the war in Ukraine, with current support for disarmament at a record low.

In 2005, Greenpeace commissioned MORI to conduct an opinion poll which asked about attitudes to Trident and the use of nuclear weapons. When asked whether the UK should replace Trident, without being told of the cost, 44% of respondents said "Yes" and 46% said "No". When asked the same question and told of the cost, 33% said "Yes" and 54% said "No".

In the same poll, when asked "Would you approve or disapprove of the UK using nuclear weapons against a country we are at war with?"

- 9% would approve if that country does not have nuclear weapons, and 84% would disapprove.
- 16% would approve if that country has nuclear weapons but has never used them, and 72% would disapprove,
- 53% would approve if that country uses nuclear weapons against the UK, and 37% would disapprove.

However, a more recent poll by YouGov in 2013 found that 24% of people supported scrapping nuclear weapons if there was an option of a cheaper, less powerful system, and 29% supported scrapping them if there was no cheaper alternative. A 2015 YouGov poll had similar results for the whole UK with 25% supporting scrapping Trident, but that increased to 48% in Scotland.

Between 2019 and 2026 support for replacing Trident with an equal capability rose from 36% to 46%. Belief in unilateral disarmament dropped from 21% to 12% over the same period.

CND's policy of opposing American nuclear bases is said to be in tune with public opinion.

There has also been opposition to the proposals by the Starmer government to procure nuclear capable F-35As and join the NATO nuclear sharing mission. This would lead to the UK hosting US nuclear weapons again for the first time since the Cold War.

=== Nuclear power ===
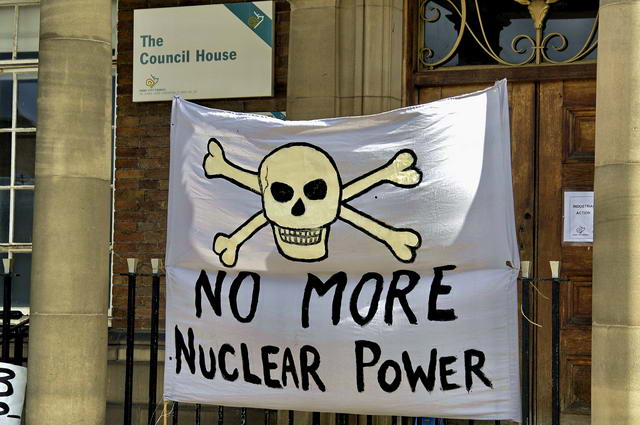
In March 2006, a protest took place in Derby where campaigners handed a letter to Margaret Beckett, head of DEFRA, outside Derby City Council about the dangers of nuclear power stations.

A large nationally representative 2010 British survey about energy issues found that public opinion is divided on the issue of nuclear power. The majority of people are concerned about nuclear power and public trust in the government and nuclear industry remains relatively low. The survey showed that there is a clear preference for renewable energy sources over nuclear power.

According to a national opinion poll, support for nuclear power in the UK dropped by twelve percent following the Fukushima Daiichi nuclear disaster.

It was reported in 2011 that the government's programme to build new nuclear power stations in England would be "delayed by at least three months so that lessons can be learned from the accident at Fukushima in Japan".

In July 2012, a YouGov poll showed that 63 percent of UK respondents agreed that nuclear generation should be part of the country's energy mix, up from 61 percent in 2010. Opposition fell to 11 percent.

Between 2012 and 2023, according to Statista, opposition to nuclear power went from 17% to 8%. Support went from 38% to 41% over the same period.

== Academics and consultants ==
In early 2008 a group of scientists and academics forming the Nuclear Consultation Working Group released a report criticising government proposals to build a new generation of nuclear power plants. Contributors included:

- Frank Barnaby, Nuclear issues consultant, Oxford Research Group.
- Andrew Dobson, Professor of Politics, University of Keele.
- Paul Dorfman, Founder, Nuclear Consulting Group.
- David Elliott, Emeritus professor of Technology Policy, The Open University.
- Ian Fairlie, Independent Nuclear Consultant.
- Kate Hudson, Chair, Campaign for Nuclear Disarmament.
- David Lowry, Independent Research Consultant.
- Jerome Ravetz
- Andy Stirling, Director of Science at SPRU, University of Sussex.
- Stephen Thomas, Professor of Energy policy, University of Greenwich.
- Gordon Walker, Chair of Environment, Risk, and Social Justice, University of Aberdeen
- Dave Webb, Emeritus Professor, Leeds Metropolitan University.
- Philip Webber, Research Fellow, Leeds University.
- Ian Welsh Reader in Sociology, University of Cardiff.
- Stuart Weir, University of Essex.
- Brian Wynne, Professor of Science Studies.

== Other individuals ==
- Pat Arrowsmith
- Meg Beresford
- Janet Bloomfield
- Hugh Brock
- Tom Burke
- Christopher Busby
- Canon John Collins
- Alex Comfort
- Peggy Duff
- David Fleming
- Michael Foot
- Martin Forwood
- Antony Froggatt
- Olive Gibbs
- Ali Hewson
- Hugh Jenkins
- Helen John
- Paul Johns
- Tony Juniper
- Rosie Kane
- Bruce Kent
- Stephen King-Hall
- John Large
- Marghanita Laski
- Jeremy Leggett
- Bertie Lewis
- Caroline Lucas
- Willie McRae
- Jean McSorley
- Hilda Murrell
- Jonathon Porritt
- Mike Pentz
- J. B. Priestley
- Michael Randle
- Pete Roche
- Joseph Rotblat
- Bertrand Russell
- Gene Sharp
- Charles Secrett
- A. J. P. Taylor
- Helen Thomas
- Marjorie Thompson
- Nicolas Walter
- Walter Wolfgang
- Angie Zelter

== Criticism ==
George Monbiot, an English writer known for his environmental and political activism, once expressed deep antipathy to the nuclear industry. He finally rejected his later neutral position regarding nuclear power in March 2011. Although he "still loathe[s] the liars who run the nuclear industry", Monbiot now advocates its use, having been convinced of its relative safety by what he considers the limited effects of the 2011 Japan tsunami on nuclear reactors in the region. Subsequently, he has harshly condemned the anti-nuclear movement, writing that it "has misled the world about the impacts of radiation on human health ... made [claims] ungrounded in science, unsupportable when challenged and wildly wrong".

== See also ==
- Civil Nuclear Constabulary
- HMNB Clyde
- Anti-nuclear organizations
- List of anti–nuclear power groups
- List of books about nuclear issues
- List of Chernobyl-related articles
- List of nuclear whistleblowers
- Nuclear-Free Future Award
- Nuclear or Not?
- Nuclear power in the United Kingdom
- Nuclear power in Scotland
- Scottish National Party
- United Nations Office for Disarmament Affairs
- Windscale: Britain’s Biggest Nuclear Disaster
- World Nuclear Industry Status Report
