= Scientists against Nuclear Arms =

Formed in 1981 by physicist and peace activist Mike Pentz, together with Steven Rose

Scientists against Nuclear Arms (SANA) was formed in 1981 by the physicist and peace activist Mike Pentz together with Steven Rose, both academics at the Open University, to oppose nuclear arms.

SANA was one of the forerunner organisations of Scientists for Global Responsibility (SGR).

== See also ==
- Campaign for Nuclear Disarmament
- Anti-nuclear movement
- Anti-war
- European Nuclear Disarmament
- Independent Nuclear Disarmament Election Committee
- International Coalition to Ban Uranium Weapons
- Nuclear disarmament
- Nuclear-Free Future Award
- Nuclear Information Service
- Nuclear proliferation
- Peace movement
