= Defence Secretariat 19 =

Former Ministry of Defence unit (UK)

Defence Secretariat 19 (DS19) was a special unit set up within the British Ministry of Defence by Michael Heseltine in March 1983. Its purpose was to combat the Campaign for Nuclear Disarmament (CND) and all calls for unilateral nuclear disarmament.

== See also ==
- Women and Families for Defence
