= Energy Fair =

Energy Fair in the United Kingdom is a group of six people leading a campaign that claims that the nuclear power industry receives unfair subsidies, consisting of:

- Dörte Fouquet, senior partner of the law firm Becker Büttner Held (BBH) and Director of the European Renewable Energies Federation.
- Antony Froggatt, energy policy consultant, senior research fellow at Chatham House.
- David Lowry, research policy consultant, specialising in nuclear issues.
- Pete Roche, energy consultant, policy adviser to the Scottish Nuclear Free Local Authorities, and the National Steering Committee of United Kingdom Nuclear Free Local Authorities.
- Stephen Thomas, energy policy researcher, University of Greenwich Business School.
- Gerry Wolff, coordinator, Desertec-UK and the Kyoto2 Support Group.

In February 2011 and January 2012, the group, supported by other organisations and environmentalists, lodged formal complaints with the European Union's Directorate General for Competition, alleging that the Government was providing unlawful State aid in the form of subsidies for nuclear power industry, in breach of European Union competition law.

One of the largest subsidies is the cap on liabilities for nuclear accidents which the nuclear power industry has negotiated with governments. “Like car drivers, the operators of nuclear plants should be properly insured,” said Gerry Wolff, coordinator of the Energy Fair group. The group calculates that, "if nuclear operators were fully insured against the cost of nuclear disasters like those at Chernobyl and Fukushima, the price of nuclear electricity would rise by at least €0.14 per kWh and perhaps as much as €2.36, depending on assumptions made".

== See also ==
- The World Nuclear Industry Status Report
- Nuclear power in the United Kingdom
- Anti-nuclear movement in the United Kingdom
- Energy subsidies
- Nuclear or Not?
