= Mike Pentz =

Physicist, peace activist

Michael John Pentz (30 November 1924 – 29 May 1995) was a physicist, activist in the peace movement, and an influential pioneer of teaching science to university students by distance education. Pentz was born in Cape Town, South Africa, and died in France.

== Life ==
Pentz was educated in South Africa at St Aidan's College, Grahamstown, and went on to attend the University of Cape Town. He came to Imperial College in London in 1948 to work on microwave spectrometry and nuclear physics. Nine years later he joined CERN in Geneva, where he was appointed leader of a large group of scientists developing the CESAR accelerator facility.

Throughout his life, Pentz was a prominent member and activist in a number of highly committed political bodies. In 1965, while working at CERN, he became the first president of the newly founded Mouvement Anti-Apartheid Suisse. From 1981 to 1984, he was Vice-Chair of the Campaign for Nuclear Disarmament (CND). Together with fellow Open University academic Steven Rose, Pentz was instrumental in the movement Scientists against Nuclear Arms (SANA), which he set up in 1981; SANA was one of the forerunner organisations of Scientists for Global Responsibility (SGR).

For health reasons, Pentz retired to Bonnieux, near Avignon, in France. He died of leukaemia in 1995.

== Career ==
- Student of physics and electrical engineering at University of Cape Town earning a BSc (Hons) degree (1944); this was followed by an MSc in physics (1945).
- 1948–49 Research assistant; 1949 assistant lecturer; 1949–57 lecturer, Department of Physics, Imperial College London
- 1957–58 Research fellow; 1958–68 senior physicist, CERN, Geneva
- 1969–85 Founding dean and director of studies, Faculty of Science, Open University
- In 1987, the Open University conferred the title emeritus professor onto Pentz.

== Open University ==
Since his early days in South Africa, where in 1943 he helped found the Adult African Night Schools Association, to his time at CERN where he threw himself into extramural activities aimed at broadening educational opportunities and spreading scientific knowledge, Pentz had a passionate commitment to the public understanding of science. In 1969 he was invited by Walter Perry, the first vice-chancellor of the Open University, to become the founding dean and director of studies of the science faculty. He pioneered the teaching of science at a distance, overcoming not only a variety of practical difficulties, but also many prejudices against the notion that science could be taught by correspondence and television. Writing in 2006, Steven Rose described the immense challenge:

The nine of us (two biologists, two chemists, two earth scientists and two physicists, plus our charismatic dean, Pentz) who constituted the initial Open University science faculty back in 1969, shared many commitments as to how and what we wanted to teach. Central was the uncompromising insistence that we were going to teach science, not "about science". In these days of dumbed-down courses and lowered standards, this might read strangely. Our view was that an OU science graduate should be able to compete on level terms with those from any other university when it came to going on to a science-based career, including research. And teaching science meant, above all, lab experience. But how do you achieve this in a distance-learning institution?

Led by newest research in educational technology, they overcame the difficulties by developing a multi-media approach, using printed texts, radio and television broadcasts, support from tutors in face-to-face tutorials, residential schools, and by the innovative use of home experiment kits.

Pentz appeared in various BBC television programmes himself, for example talking to a cat breeder about genetics, or demonstrating, with the use of a huge pendulum bob suspended from the dome of St. Paul's Cathedral in London, that the plane in which the pendulum swung actually rotated relative to the cathedral, because of the daily rotation of the Earth.

Having built on Pentz's work in establishing science education by distance teaching, the OU's Science Faculty today supports a large proportion of all the part-time science degree studies in the UK: as of 2012, there are about 48,000 (mainly UK-based) students studying OU undergraduate and postgraduate science modules. Pentz's passion to inform and his belief that science could be taught to anyone who wanted to learn it also inspired many distance educators in other countries and continents to follow his example.

== Peace work ==
In Pentz's obituary, Labour politician Tam Dalyell wrote: "[...] no activist bestowed greater scientific respectability on, or devoted more energy to, the crusade against nuclear weapons than did Pentz. No big anti-nuclear weapons demonstration in the 1980s was complete without Pentz's large, lumberjacketed presence, leading a march or gracing a platform." As an opponent of nuclear deterrence and of NATO's doctrine of flexible response, Pentz believed that a nuclear war could not in any way remain limited, and would inevitably lead to widespread destruction. Consequently, Pentz became a vocal activist for nuclear disarmament, joining many significant peace marches of the 1970s and 1980s.

Pentz never sought to conceal controversial affiliations: he was, for example, a sponsor of the British arm of the leading Soviet front body, the World Peace Council (WPC). In May 1984, he went to Moscow at the invitation of the official Soviet Peace Committee to establish links with the Kremlin's "Scientific Research Council on Problems of Peace and Disarmament".

== Legacy ==
The Open University named a building on its campus in Milton Keynes after Pentz.

== Publications ==
- Pentz, Michael J., Towards a final abyss? The state of the nuclear arms race. J.D. Bernal Peace Library, 1981, 16 pp. ASIN B0007AWP4M.
- Pentz, Michael J., Accelerator research at CERN 1956–1967, CERN 1967, Volume 68, Issue 9 of CERN (Series), 22 pp.
- Pentz, Michael J., British Peace Committee, The nuclear arms race: new dangers, new possibilities of disarmament, 1976. ISBN 0950518204, ISBN 978-0950518206.
- Mike Pentz, Milo Shott, Francis Aprahamian (editor), Handling Experimental Data. Open University Press, 1988, 96 pp. ISBN 9780335158249.
