= Stephen Thomas (economist) =

Stephen Thomas is a professor at the University of Greenwich Business School, working in the area of energy policy. Before moving to the University of Greenwich in 2001, Thomas worked for twenty-two years at the University of Sussex.

== Research work ==
Stephen Thomas is professor at the University of Greenwich Business School, and has been a researcher in the area of energy policy for over twenty-five years. He specialises in the economics and policy of nuclear power (of which he is a critic), liberalisation and privatisation of the electricity and gas industries, and trade policy on network energy industries. Thomas serves on the editorial boards of several periodicals including Energy Policy, Utilities Policy, Energy & Environment, and International Journal of Regulation and Governance.

Before moving to the University of Greenwich in 2001, Thomas worked for twenty-two years at the Science Policy Research Unit (SPRU) at the University of Sussex.

== Selected publications ==
- Mycle Schneider; Antony Froggatt & Steve Thomas (July 2011). "2010-2011 world nuclear industry status report" (PDF). Bulletin of the Atomic Scientists. 67 (4): 60–77. Bibcode:2011BuAtS..67d..60S. doi:10.1177/0096340211413539.
- with Mycle Schneider and Antony Froggatt (2011). World Nuclear Industry Status Report 2010-2011: Nuclear Power in a Post-Fukushima World, Worldwatch Institute.
- with Mycle Schneider, Antony Froggatt, and Doug Koplow. The World Nuclear Industry Status Report 2009 Commissioned by German Federal Ministry of Environment, Nature Conservation and Reactor Safety, August 2009.
- International Perspectives on Energy Policy and the Role of Nuclear Power, Multi-Science Publishing, 2009.
- The grin of the Cheshire cat, Energy Policy, vol 34, 15, 2006, pp 1974–1983.
- The British Model in Britain: failing slowly, Energy Policy, vol 34, 5, 2006, pp 583–600.
- The UK Nuclear Decommissioning Authority, Energy & Environment, vol 16, no 6, 2005, pp 923–935.
- Evaluating the British Model of electricity deregulation, Annals of Public and Cooperative Economics, vol 75, 3, 2004, pp 367–398.

== See also ==
- Andy Stirling
- David Elliott
- Energy Fair
- Gordon Walker
- World Nuclear Industry Status Report
