= Scientists for Global Responsibility =

Scientists for Global Responsibility (SGR) in the United Kingdom promotes the ethical practice and use of science, design and technology. SGR is affiliated to the International Network of Engineers and Scientists for Global Responsibility (INES). It is an independent UK-based membership organisation of hundreds of natural scientists, social scientists, engineers, IT professionals and architects. In 2017 its partner organization ICAN (International Campaign to Abolish Nuclear Weapons) won the Nobel Peace Prize. ICAN have promoted a Kurzgesagt YouTube video endorsed by the International Committee of the Red Cross and Crescent (ICRC) showing the consequences of a single atomic weapon exploded over a city.

SGR's work is focused on four main issues: security and disarmament; climate change and energy, including nuclear power; who controls science and technology?; emerging technologies. The main areas of concern are arms and arms control, including military involvement in UK universities; effect of excessive greenhouse gas emissions on climate; the nature of war and reducing barbarity; topsoil and water shortages resulting from modern agricultural methods; depletion of species of fish due to over-fishing; continual spread of nuclear weapons, and reduction of occurrence of serious nuclear accidents.

In 2019 SGR launched the journal Responsible Science. SGR evaluates the risk of new science and new technological solutions to older science-based problems and threats, while recognizing the enormous contribution science, design and technology has made to civilisation and human well-being.

SGR promotes science, design and technology that contribute to peace, social justice and environmental sustainability.

== See also ==
- Campaign for Nuclear Disarmament
- Scientists against Nuclear Arms, a forerunner of SGR
