= Mycle Schneider =

German nuclear energy consultant

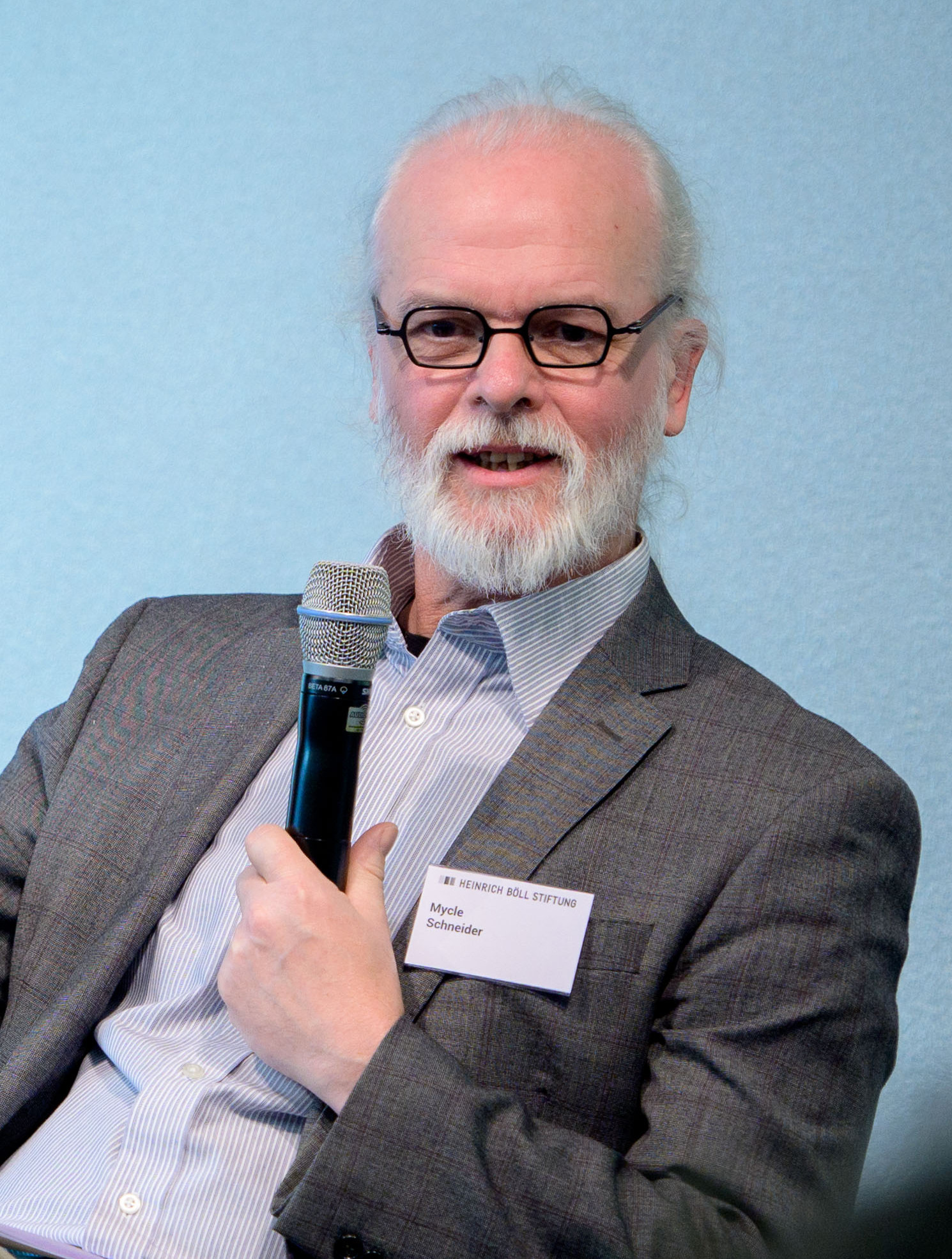
Schneider in 2019

Mycle Schneider (pronounced Michael, /ˈmaɪkəl/) (born 1959 in Cologne) is a German nuclear energy consultant and anti-nuclear activist based in Paris. He is the lead author of The World Nuclear Industry Status Reports. He has advised members of the European Parliament on energy issues for more than twenty years. In 1997 he received the Right Livelihood Award.

== Biography ==
Mycle Schneider is a self-taught energy consultant, nuclear analyst, and anti-nuclear activist who has been adviser to Green members of the European Parliament on energy issues for more than twenty years. From 1998 to 2003, Schneider was an adviser on energy policy to the French environment minister's office and the Belgian minister for energy and sustainable development. Since 2000, he has been a consultant on nuclear issues to the German environment ministry.

Schneider is a member of the International Panel on Fissile Materials, and the nuclear non-proliferation group Independent Group of Scientific Experts (IGSE), which is based at Hamburg University. From 2004 to 2009, he has overseen the Environment and Energy Strategies lecture series for the Environmental and Energy Engineering Program at the French Ecole des Mines in Nantes.

Mycle Schneider founded the "citizen's science" group WISE-Paris in 1983 and directed it until 2003.

== Awards ==
In 1997, along with Jinzaburo Takagi, Schneider received the Right Livelihood Award "... for serving to alert the world to the unparalleled dangers of plutonium to human life."

== Publications ==
Schneider writes numerous publications on safety, proliferation and economic trends of the nuclear industry. He is co-editor of the 2009 book International Perspectives on Energy Policy and the Role of Nuclear Power. His World Nuclear Industry Status Report 2009 was published by the German government. Schneider and Antony Froggatt wrote the Systems for Change report for the Heinrich Böll Foundation in 2010. Also in 2010, Schneider wrote a chapter in the book Nuclear Power’s Global Expansion: Weighing Its Costs and Risks. He has commented extensively on the implications of the 2011 Japanese nuclear accidents.

== See also ==
- Anti-nuclear movement in Canada
- Anti-nuclear movement in France
- Non-nuclear future
- Stephen Thomas
- Amory Lovins
- Monique Sené
