= Lady Olga Maitland =

British Conservative politician, author and journalist (born 1944)

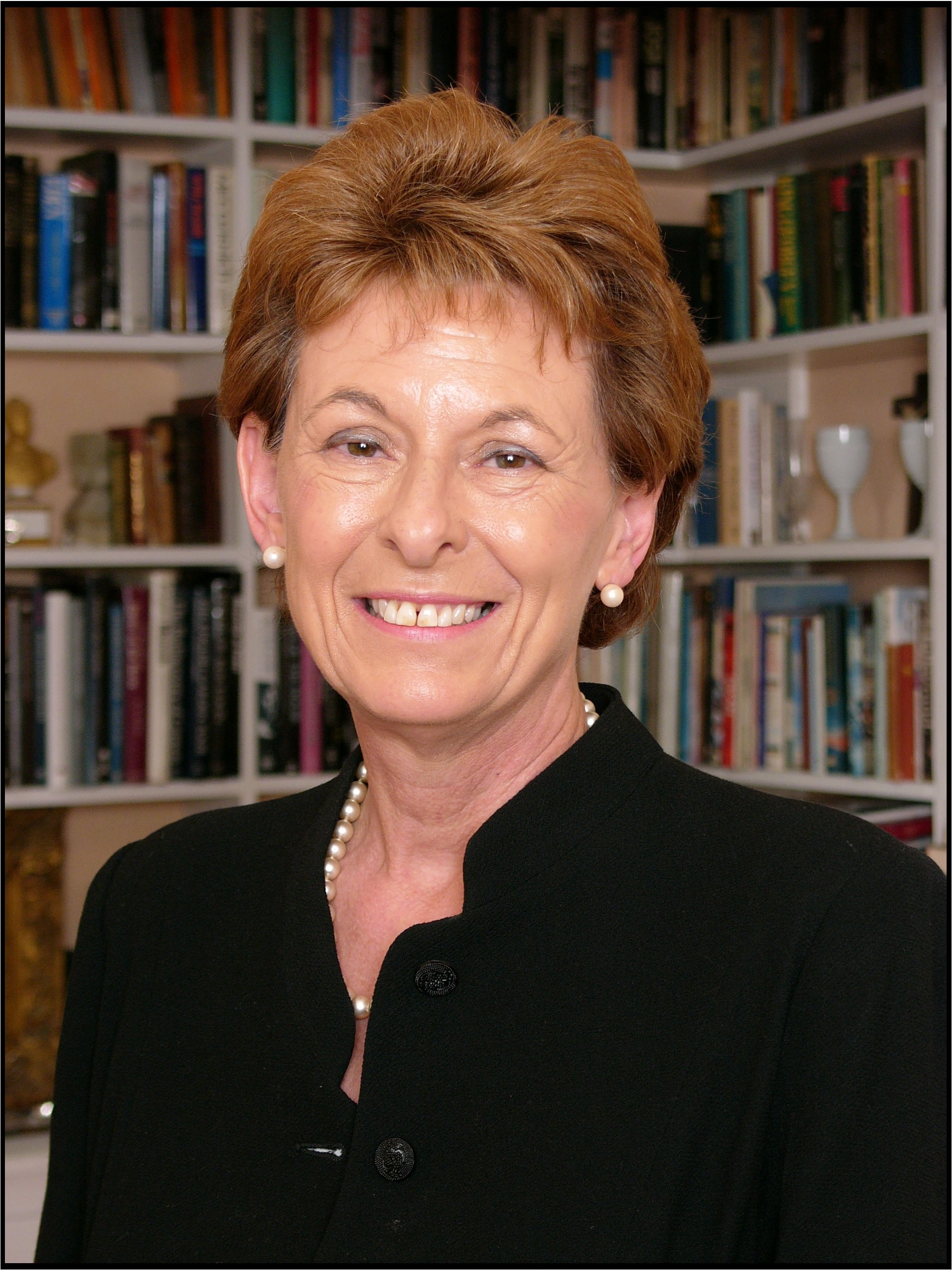
- Lady Olga Maitland in 2006

Member of Parliament for Sutton and Cheam
- In office 9 April 1992 – 8 April 1997
- Preceded by: Neil Macfarlane
- Succeeded by: Paul Burstow

Personal details
- Born: Helen Olga Maitland; 23 May 1944 (age 82) New York City, USA
- Party: Conservative
- Spouse: Robin William Patrick Hamilton Hay (m. 1969)
- Children: 3

Lady Helen Olga Hay (née Maitland; born 23 May 1944), widely known as Lady Olga Maitland, is a British journalist, author, and Conservative politician. She served as the Member of Parliament for Sutton and Cheam from 1992 to 1997 and has been involved in defence advocacy and international business development.

== Family and education ==
Helen Olga Maitland was born on 23 May 1944, in New York City, USA, the elder daughter of Patrick Maitland, 17th Earl of Lauderdale, a war correspondent for The Times, later Conservative MP, and Stanka (née Losanitch), whose mother had been a lady in waiting to the royal family of Yugoslavia. She was educated at St Mary and St Anne's School, Abbots Bromley (later known as the Abbots Bromley School for Girls), and the Lycée Français Charles de Gaulle in South Kensington. At the age of 16, she joined the Young Conservatives.

== Career ==
Maitland began her journalism career in 1964 as a reporter for the Fleet Street News Agency and the Blackheath and District Reporter. In 1967, she became a columnist for the Sunday Express, a role she held until 1991. She worked as a freelance journalist from 1991, contributing to the Daily Mail between 1998 and 2001. In the 1980s, Maitland reported to MI5 an attempt by Yuri Sagaidak, a KGB agent posing as a journalist for Komsomolskaya Pravda, to recruit her. In 1989, MI5 assessed Sagaidak as a security risk leading to his expulsion from the United Kingdom.

=== Politics ===
Maitland's political journey began in 1983 when she founded Women for Defence, a campaigning group established to counter protests against the deployment of American Cruise missiles on British soil. It also opposed movements such as the Greenham Common Women's Peace Camp and the Campaign for Nuclear Disarmament (CND), promoting nuclear deterrence as a pathway to multilateral disarmament. The group was later renamed Families for Defence. Its official launch on 28 March 1983, marked by a public meeting in Trafalgar Square, drew significant attention and recognition from U.S. President Ronald Reagan. On 19 January 1984, she participated in a public debate at Islington Central Library in London titled "Is Britain Worth Dying For?" Representing Women and Families for Defence, she argued in favour of the proposition, while a representative of the Socialist Party of Great Britain, argued against it. The organisation evolved into the Defence and Security Forum (DSF), a think tank which addresses global defence and foreign affairs. Maitland serves as its president.

At the 1987 general election, Maitland stood as the Conservative candidate for Bethnal Green and Stepney, but was unsuccessful. She later represented Sutton and Cheam as its MP from the 1992 general election until that of 1997, when the Conservative Party lost power, and she was defeated by Liberal Democrat Paul Burstow by 2,097 votes. Maitland contested the constituency again in 2001 but was not re-elected.

During her tenure in Westminster, Maitland specialised in defence and security matters. She served on several Parliamentary Committees, including:

- The Procedure Committee (27 April 1992 – 26 June 1995)
- The Statutory Instruments Select Committee (7 February 1995 – 21 March 1997)
- The Statutory Instruments Joint Committee (7 February 1995 – 21 March 1997)
- The Health and Social Care Committee (10 June 1996 – 21 March 1997)

Maitland was secretary to Conservative Backbench Committees on Northern Ireland, Defence, and Foreign Affairs, and to the Yugoslav Parliamentary Group. She introduced Private Members Bills in the House of Commons on Prisoner's Return to Custody (1995) and Offensive Weapons (1996). From 1996 to 1997, she served as parliamentary private secretary to Sir John Wheeler, then Minister of State for Northern Ireland at the Northern Ireland Office.

She has been vocal against positive discrimination, advocating for women to achieve political positions based on merit rather than quotas. In January 1997, during a debate in the House of Commons, Maitland described the suggestion of caning girls as "barbaric", expressing her opposition to the reinstatement of corporal punishment in schools. In the lead-up to the 2001 general election, Maitland was featured in a BBC News article that detailed her efforts to regain the Sutton and Cheam seat, highlighting her campaign activities, including door-to-door canvassing and direct constituent engagement.

=== Beyond politics ===
Maitland has worked in security and governmental activities for over 35 years, focusing on business development in Africa, the Middle East, and Asia. She served as CEO of the International Association of Money Transfer Networks (IAMTN), a London-based not-for-profit organisation established to support the remittances sector and help fight money laundering. In 2005, she cofounded the Algeria British Business Council (ABBC), promoting economic collaboration between Algeria and the UK.

== Personal life ==
On 19 April 1969, Maitland married Robin William Patrick Hamilton Hay, M.A., LL.B., a barrister who later became a Crown Court Recorder. The couple have three children. Following her marriage, Maitland retained her own name for public life.

== Publications ==
=== Books ===
- Maitland, Lady Olga (1989). Margaret Thatcher The First Ten Years. Sidgwick & Jackson. ISBN 0283998318.

=== Articles ===
- "Peace Studies in our Schools" (1985; contributor)
- "Faith in the Family" (1997)
- "Political Indoctrination in Our Schools"

Parliament of the United Kingdom
Preceded by Neil Macfarlane	Member of Parliament for Sutton and Cheam; 1992–1997	Succeeded by Paul Burstow
