= European Nuclear Disarmament =

European Nuclear Disarmament (END) was a Europe-wide movement for a "nuclear-free Europe from Poland to Portugal” that put on annual European Nuclear Disarmament conventions from 1982 to 1991.

== Origins ==
The founding statement of END was the European Nuclear Disarmament Appeal issued in April 1980 and circulated by the Bertrand Russell Peace Foundation (http://www.russfound.org). It was provoked by NATO's decision in December 1979 to respond to a Soviet upgrading of intermediate-range nuclear missiles in Europe with its own nuclear modernisation – cruise and Pershing II missiles to be deployed in Britain, Germany, the Netherlands, Belgium and Italy.

The appeal began:

We are entering the most dangerous decade in human history. A third world war is not merely possible but increasingly likely . . . In Europe, the main geographical stage for the East-West confrontation, new generations of ever more deadly nuclear weapons are appearing.

The document was notable for two things in particular. First, it resolutely refused to take sides in the Cold War:

We do not wish to apportion guilt between the military leaders of East and West. Guilt lies squarely upon both parties. Both parties have adopted menacing postures and committed aggressive actions in different parts of the world. . .

Secondly, it argued not just for disarmament (a nuclear-free Europe "from Poland to Portugal”) but also for the destruction of the bloc system that had divided Europe since 1945 – a goal it envisaged being achieved by a novel strategy of “détente from below”:

The remedy lies in our own hands . . . We must commence to act as if a united, neutral and pacific Europe already exists. We must learn to be loyal, not to ‘East’ or ‘West’, but to each other, and we must disregard the prohibitions and limitations imposed by any national state . . . We must resist any attempt by the statesmen of East and west to manipulate this movement to their own advantage. . .

The main authors of the appeal were British – E. P. Thompson, Mary Kaldor, Dan Smith and Ken Coates – and it was launched at a press conference in the House of Commons. But their intention was to create a Europe-wide movement, and by summer 1980 it had been endorsed by an impressive list of supporters, mainly in western Europe but with a smattering from the Soviet bloc, among them former Hungarian prime minister András Hegedüs and Russian dissident Roy Medvedev. Several other East European intellectuals signed later.

== The END Conventions ==
With movements for nuclear disarmament emerging throughout western Europe and gaining support from social democratic and Euro-communist parties, the Russell Foundation, centred on Ken Coates, consulted about organising a massive conference to bring together everyone involved. The first European Nuclear Disarmament Convention subsequently took place in Brussels, Belgium, in 1982. According to historian Lawrence Wittner (1993) END was "the very heart and soul of the massive antinuclear campaign" (p. 234).

Most participants considered the convention a success, and Coates's ad hoc conference organising committee became a semi-permanent END Liaison Committee, with members from the main west European peace movement organisations and most west European social-democratic and Euro-communist parties, which organised further END Conventions in Berlin (1983), Perugia, Italy (1984), Amsterdam (1985), Évry, France (1986), Coventry, UK (1987), Lund, Sweden (1988), Vitoria-Gasteiz, Spain (1989), Helsinki, Finland/Tallinn, Estonia (1990) and finally Moscow (1991).

During these conventions, especially in Perugia and Amsterdam, there was an intensive cooperation with the Dutch Interchurch Peace Council (IKV) and their secretary-general Mient Jan Faber and Wim Bartels. Bartels was also the president of the International Peace Coordination Centre (IPCC), a cooperation of 'like-minded' movements, which linked their commitment of the struggle against nuclear weapons and the support of independent, dissident peace-initiatives in Eastern-Europe. Despite this intensive cooperation there also existed some kind of rivalry between the END network and the IPCC. Since most peace movements were present in both, it seemed both networks were doing very similar work.

== END in the UK ==
Thompson, Kaldor and others in the END group in the UK disagreed with Coates's interest in winning the support of political parties and trade union leaders, and in 1983 there was a parting of the ways: Coates and his Nottingham-based Bertrand Russell Peace Foundation concentrated on the Convention process, leaving Thompson and Kaldor as dominant figures in the UK END group. From then on, the UK END group was very much a separate entity from the conventions, although it took part in them and was represented on the Liaison Committee.

Nationally, END only became a membership organisation in 1985, when the nuclear disarmament movement was ebbing, when it recruited only 500 members. However, when the nuclear disarmament first grew in 1980 and 1981, in some localities local nuclear disarmament groups were founded as 'END groups': Hull END, for example, had hundreds of members throughout the first half of the 1980s. Nationally END played a major role in the British peace movement of the 1980s. END supporters, most notably Thompson and Kaldor, were the most prominent intellectuals of the movement, constantly in demand for public meetings and for opinion pieces in newspapers and magazines (The Guardian, the New Statesman and Tribune were always particularly keen). END also provided the main peace movement organisation, the Campaign for Nuclear Disarmament (CND), with much of its leadership: (Bruce Kent, Joan Ruddock, Dan Smith and Meg Beresford were all END supporters).

END's insistence on criticising Soviet militarism made it highly controversial in CND, where communists and pro-Soviet Labour leftists were a vocal though small minority – but it meant that it was taken much more seriously by the Labour Party, which had adopted a non-nuclear defence policy in 1980. More than 60 Labour MPs signed the END Appeal in 1980, and END supporters, among them Kaldor and Smith, served on Labour advisory committees on defence. END also had significant support among Liberals opposed to nuclear arms (although not among their allies in the Social Democratic Party) as well as among members of the nascent Green party. Even a few daring dissident members of the Conservative and Communist parties lent their support.

END also organised regular speaking tours and conferences on various disarmament-related themes.

== END Publications ==
The END Bulletin and ENDPapers series were published by the Russell Foundation, beginning in 1980. Subsequently, British END published a series of pamphlets through Merlin Press and a bi-monthly magazine, European Nuclear Disarmament Journal, which was edited by Mary Kaldor. It was published from 1983 to 1988.

== Détente from below ==
What END was probably best known for, however, was its work with dissidents in the Soviet Union and its east-central European satellite states. Although the END Appeal had won some support from dissidents in the Soviet bloc at its launch, most were hesitant about the western peace movements, which they felt were parroting Soviet slogans and had no sympathy for people living under communist dictatorship. Václav Havel expressed this view forcefully in his essay “An Anatomy of a Reticence” (1985).

Nevertheless, thanks largely to the persistence of END and like-minded activists from other countries, who kept up a constant stream of correspondence with dissidents in the Soviet bloc and visited them whenever they could, by the mid-1980s a fruitful dialogue had been established. END had working groups for each Soviet bloc country. The Czechoslovakia group exchanged views with and visited Havel and his colleagues in Charter 77 in Czechoslovakia; the Hungary group did the same with György Konrád, Miklos Haraszti and a small group of young peace activists in Hungary; the Poland group the same with Adam Michnik, Jacek Kuron and many younger activists; the East Germany group the same with Bärbel Bohley and others who were later to be the core of Neues Forum.

== The end of END ==
Both the END Conventions and the UK END group went into decline in the late 1980s after the 1987 Intermediate-range Nuclear Forces treaty removed the weapons that had given the European peace movement its raison d’etre – though the conventions continued until 1991 (in Moscow) and END in the UK turned itself in 1989 into European Dialogue, a pressure group for encouraging the development of democracy and civil society, which is still going. However, END had contributed substantially, historian Martin Shaw argues, to removing intermediate-range nuclear missiles and ending the Cold War.

The Bertrand Russell Peace Foundation launched END Info (European Nuclear Disarmament Information) in March 2019 in response to the collapse of the Intermediate-range Nuclear Forces Treaty and attendant nuclear risks. The Russell Foundation worked with others across Europe to launch a 'Nuke Free Europe' network that campaigns to rid the continent of all nuclear weapons.

== See also ==
- United States missile defence Eastern European Campaign Against Missile Defence
- The Bertrand Russell Peace Foundation (http://www.russfound.org)
- Women's Peace Train

== Bibliography ==
- Wittner, Lawrence S., Toward Nuclear Abolition. A History of the World Nuclear Disarmament Movement, 1971 to the Present, Stanford, Calif., Stanford University Press, 2003.

== Archives ==
- Catalogue of the END papers at LSE Library
- European Nuclear Disarmament Bulletin pdf archive and Index at Spokesman Books (publishing imprint of the Bertrand Russell Peace Foundation)
