= Janet Bloomfield =

British peace and disarmament campaigner (1953–2007)

- Born: Janet Elizabeth Hood; 10 October 1953; Newcastle-under-Lyme, Staffordshire, England
- Died: 2 April 2007 (aged 53)
- Education: Sussex University
- Political party: Green Party
- Board member of: Chair of the Campaign for Nuclear Disarmament

Janet Elizabeth Bloomfield (née Hood; 10 October 1953 – 2 April 2007) was a British peace and disarmament campaigner who was chair of the Campaign for Nuclear Disarmament (CND) from 1993 to 1996.

== Biography ==
Born in Newcastle-under-Lyme, Staffordshire, England, Bloomfield was educated at Abbeydale Grange School, Sheffield and Sussex University, where she obtained a BA (Hons) degree in Geography.

Bloomfield was the Chair of the CND, the largest peace and disarmament organisation in Europe from 1993 to 1996. During this time she helped to develop CND's campaign around the 1995 Review and Extension Conference of the Nuclear Non-Proliferation Treaty, which included the production of the influential Blueprint for a Nuclear Weapon Free World.

She was active in the anti-nuclear movement from 1981. She was a local group secretary, national council and executive, regional worker in the West Midlands for CND. She was the National Vice-Chair for two years before being elected Chair in 1993. She was honorary Vice-President of CND at the time of her death.

She was a consultant (Vice-President 1994–1997) to the Geneva-based International Peace Bureau, a Nobel Peace Prize-winning network of non-aligned peace organisations in 44 countries. She was a member of the Global Council of Abolition 2000 since 1997, Global Network to Eliminate Nuclear Weapons and convened the Abolition Now Campaign Working Group of Abolition, 2000. Bloomfield was a distinguished expert speaker at the United Nations Department for Disarmament Affairs.

Bloomfield organised the campaign to stop arms trade shows being held at the National Exhibition Centre in Birmingham in 1991. She organised and led the Atomic Mirror Pilgrimage 1996 around nuclear and sacred sites of England, Scotland and Wales. This was filmed and made into a documentary called "Sacred Fire".

She was a consultant to the Oxford Research Group.

After 1997, Bloomfield's main work was as UK co-ordinator of the Atomic Mirror (she was the British director from 1995), whose goal is to create a nuclear-free world. The Atomic Mirror works with activists, artists, and indigenous peoples from nuclear sites, developing initiatives and joint activities to inspire people to take action, and abolish nuclear weapons and power. The Atomic Mirror is a founding member of the Weapons of Mass Destruction Awareness Programme, of which Bloomfield was a spokesperson.

== Affiliations ==
- Charter 88 signatory and a Fellow of the British-American Project
- Joined Green Party in 1996.
- Member of Thaxted Monthly Meeting of the Religious Society of Friends (Quakers)
- Co-Clerk of the Peace Campaigning and Networking Group of the Quakers' Peace and Social Witness.

== Family ==
She married Richard Bloomfield in 1976; they had two children.

== See also ==
- List of peace activists

Preceded by Marjorie Thompson	Chair of CND; 1993–1996	Succeeded by David Knight
