= Meg Beresford =

British campaigner against nuclear weapons and activist

Meg Beresford (born 5 September 1937) is a British campaigner against nuclear weapons and general secretary of the Campaign for Nuclear Disarmament from 1985 to 1990.

An activist involved with the European Nuclear Disarmament (END) movement, she came to prominence as END's organising secretary.

In 1985 Beresford was appointed General Secretary for Campaign for Nuclear Disarmament, Europe's largest single-issue peace campaign. Her term concluded in 1990, and she subsequently worked as a gardener for the Iona Community on the island of Iona.

== Works ==
- "CND and the Soviet Union", Sanity, January 1985

== See also ==
- List of peace activists

Preceded by Bruce Kent	General Secretary of CND; 1985–1990	Succeeded by Gary Lefley
