= Nuclear Information Service =

Nuclear Information Service (NIS) is an independent, non-profit research organisation which investigates the UK nuclear weapons programme and publishes information to stimulate informed debate on nuclear disarmament and related issues.

NIS conducts original research, providing information on the public interest issues surrounding nuclear weapons. This results in reports, articles, press releases, webinars, discussion events, legal action and consultation services to other organisations, parliament and government agencies.

Over the years it has focused in from general peace and disarmament work to concentrate on serving the disarmament community, media and decision-makers with research on the maintenance, upgrades and transport of nuclear weapons. This work has included research on the Atomic Weapons Establishment at Aldermaston and Burghfield and on warhead modification, new warhead development, decommissioning, nuclear convoys, outsourcing/privatisation, costs and delays, safety and accidents.

NIS circulates information through its website, newsletters, social media and blogs and links with individuals and organisations working on similar issues. Its archives go back to 1991 and it is in the process of digitising and uploading the vast archives of the late John Ainslie, Scottish CND campaigner which date back to the 1970s and the Cold War. NIS is the successor to the Nuclear Information Project (NIP). It became an incorporated company limited by guarantee in 2000 and is funded by charitable trusts, foundations and public donations.

Patrons: Jonathon Porritt, Nick Ritchie, John Downer, Phil Johnstone, Andy Stirling

== See also ==
- Anti-nuclear movement in the United Kingdom
- Campaign for Nuclear Disarmament
- International Day for the Total Elimination of Nuclear Weapons
