= Bruce Kent =

British political activist (1929–2022)

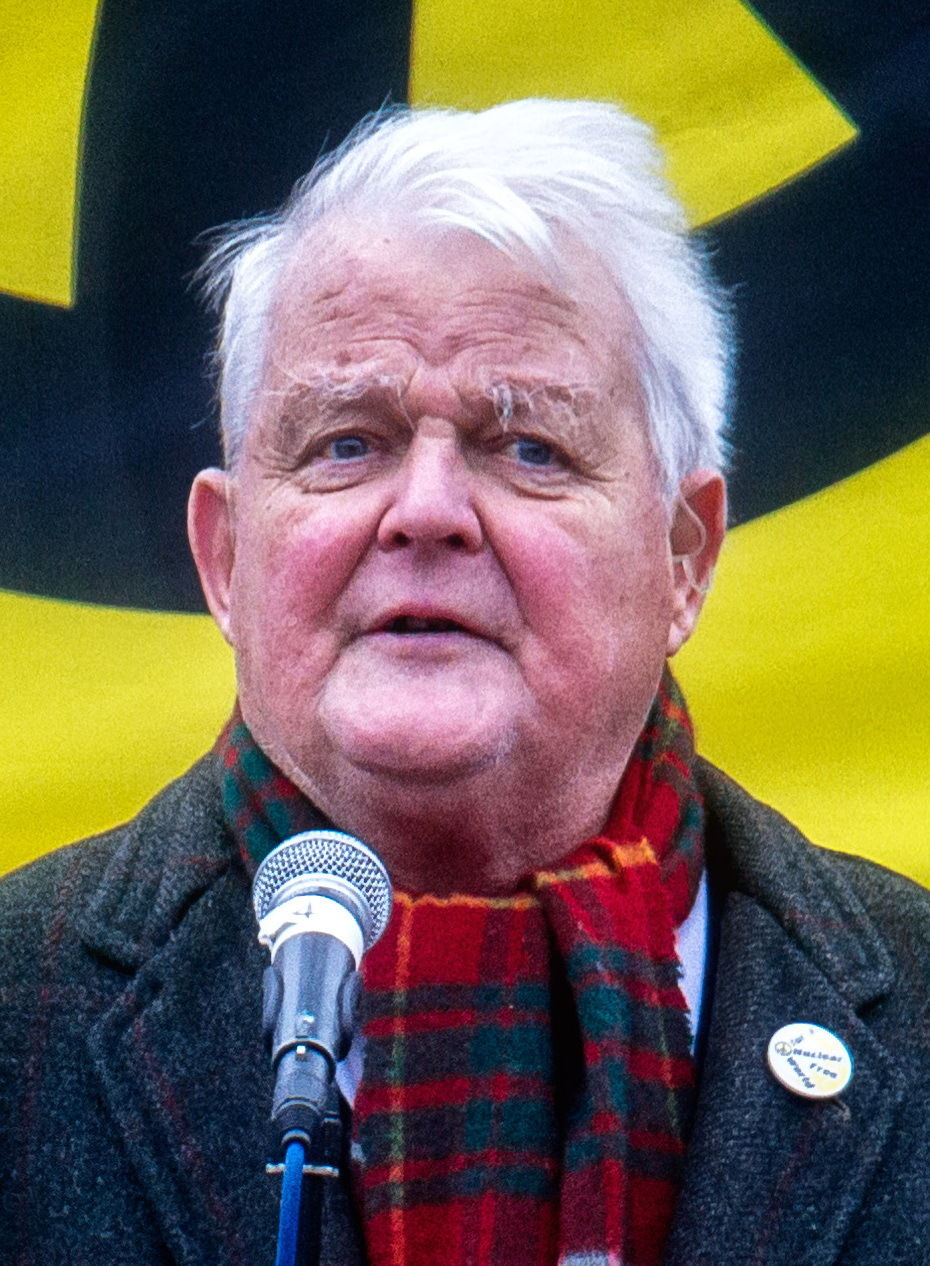
- Kent in 2016
- Born: David Bruce Kent; 22 June 1929; Blackheath, London, England
- Died: 8 June 2022 (aged 92); Harringay, London, England
- Education: Stonyhurst College; Brasenose College, Oxford; St Edmund's seminary
- Known for: Campaign for Nuclear Disarmament: Secretary General (1980–1985); Chairman (1977–1979 and 1987–1990)
- Spouse: Valerie Flessati (m. 1988)

Ecclesiastical career
- Religion: Christianity
- Church: Roman Catholic Church
- Ordained: 1958 (priest)
- Laicised: c. 1988
- Title: The Very Reverend Monsignor
- Website: bruce-kent.com

David Bruce Kent (22 June 1929 – 8 June 2022) was an English Roman Catholic priest who became a political activist in the Campaign for Nuclear Disarmament (CND), holding various leadership positions in the organisation.

== Early life and education ==
Born on 22 June 1929 in Blackheath, Southeast London, Kent was the son of Molly (Marion) and Kenneth Kent. His parents were Canadian, with his father Presbyterian and his mother Catholic. He was educated in Canada at Lower Canada College, to escape The Blitz of the Second World War. He returned to England and attended Stonyhurst College.

After completing his schooling, he was called up for National Service; this was a period of his life that he "enjoyed and never tried to disown". He served in the Royal Tank Regiment, British Army from 1947 to 1949. After officer training, he was commissioned in the Royal Armoured Corps as a second lieutenant on 20 August 1948.

During a period of leave from the army, he attended the Easter 1949 retreat at Stonyhurst College, his old school, and first felt the call to the priesthood. His Presbyterian father disapproved and negotiated that he would first attend university before making a decision. As such, after finishing his military service, he went on to read Jurisprudence at Brasenose College, Oxford, from 1949 to 1952. In 1952, his mind made up, he began a six-year course studying for the priesthood at St Edmund's seminary in Ware, Hertfordshire.

== Priesthood ==
In 1958, Kent was ordained as a Catholic priest for the Diocese of Westminster. He served his curacy at Our Lady of Victories, Kensington and then at St Pius X Parish Church, North Kensington. From 1963 to 1966, he served as secretary to Cardinal John Heenan. Kent was made a Monsignor at only 35 years old. Between 1966 and 1974, he was the Catholic chaplain to the University of London. From 1974 to 1976, he was chaplain to Pax Christi and chairman of the charity War on Want. In 1977, he returned to parish ministry, having been appointed as parish priest of St Aloysius Church, Somers Town, near Euston railway station. Having been granted permission by Cardinal Basil Hume, he accepted the appointment as general secretary of the Campaign for Nuclear Disarmament in January 1980, and was moved to become an assistant priest at St John the Evangelist Church, Islington.

In February 1987, Kent retired from the priesthood. Contrary to some reports, he claimed to have never requested laicization and to have remained a priest. However, his canonically illicit marriage 14 months after his retirement incurred automatic laicization.

In 1992, he was a candidate for the Labour Party in the constituency of Oxford West and Abingdon, where he came third. Had he been elected, he would at the time have been prevented, as an ordained priest, from taking his seat in the House of Commons. Sitting Member of Parliament and Conservative minister John Patten, also a Catholic, retained his seat.

== Activism ==
In 1958, Kent joined Pax Christi, having been invited to become a chaplain to the Catholic peace movement. He had chaired a talk in Kensington by Thomas Roberts, a Jesuit bishop: Roberts convinced Kent that a nuclear deterrence was "wicked" and that although the Church taught just war theory, it did not support the direct targeting of non-combatants.

In 1960, Kent joined the Christian Campaign for Nuclear Disarmament, a specialist section of the Campaign for Nuclear Disarmament (CND). He was CND's general secretary from 1980 to 1985 and its chair from 1987 to 1990, and later held the honorary title of vice-president. In the 1980s, he led resistance to the deployment of the BGM-109G Ground Launched Cruise Missile at RAF Greenham Common.

From 1985 to 1992, Kent succeeded Seán MacBride as president of the International Peace Bureau. In 1997, he took part in the Musa Anter peace train to Diyarbakır, which aimed for a solution for the Kurdish-Turkish conflict. In a ceremony held on 19 October 2019, Kent was honoured with its MacBride Peace Prize.

Kent was a patron of the Palestine Solidarity Campaign.

In April 2021, the Archbishop of Canterbury Justin Welby awarded the Lambeth Cross for Ecumenism jointly to Kent and to his wife Valerie Flessati "for exceptional, tireless and lifelong dedication to the Christian ecumenical search for peace, both individually and together."

Among his heroes was Franz Jägerstätter, the Austrian farmer who was executed in 1943 for refusing to fight in Hitler's army. As recently as 15 May 2022, Kent took part in the annual ceremony in Tavistock Square, London, to honour conscientious objectors throughout the world.

== Personal life and death ==
Kent married Valerie Flessati on 4 July 1988 and lived in Harringay, North London. They did not have any children.

Kent died at home on 8 June 2022, at the age of 92, after a short illness. At the time of his death he was a vice-president of CND, a vice-president of Pax Christi, and emeritus president of the Movement for the Abolition of War. On 4 July 2022, his requiem mass was held at St Mellitus' Church, Tollington Park, London, with Archbishop Malcolm McMahon presiding.

Kent's great-nephew is English actor and songwriter Joe Alwyn.

== See also ==
- List of peace activists
- Biography on personal website

Preceded by John Cox	Chair of CND; 1977–1979	Succeeded by Hugh Jenkins
Preceded by Duncan Rees	General Secretary of CND; 1979–1985	Succeeded by Meg Beresford
Preceded by Paul Johns	Chair of CND; 1987–1990	Succeeded by Marjorie Thompson
