= Women and Families for Defence =

British pro-nuclear pressure group

Women and Families for Defence was a Conservative-aligned pressure group originally founded in March 1983 as Women for Defence. It was founded in opposition to the Greenham Common Women's Peace Camp and the Campaign for Nuclear Disarmament, and aimed to oppose arguments in favour of unilateral nuclear disarmament.

It was reportedly founded by Lady Olga Maitland, Ann Widdecombe, Virginia Bottomley and Angela Rumbold (who also became vice-chairwoman of the organization). However, Alfred Sherman told the Sunday Times that it was Maitland who 'solely' set up the group, with his help. The Viscount Trenchard, the former Minister for Defence Procurement, became its president.

The group had its own magazine, Deter, and received a commendation from the U.S. president, Ronald Reagan. The group held its first public meeting on 1 May 1983 in Trafalgar Square, whereupon 150 members of the group met, sang "Land of Hope and Glory" and argued in favour of a nuclear deterrent as a precursor to multilateral nuclear disarmament. The group also delivered a petition signed by 13,000 people to respond to the proposals of the West for missile reductions. In 1986, it was expelled from a council that was organising events to mark the International Year of Peace that year.

Maitland later turned the group into a general anti-Labour political canvassing group, Women and Families for Canvassing.
