= Medact =

UK charitable organisation

- Founded: 1992
- Type: Membership organisation for health workers
- Purpose: Public health
- Location: London, United-Kingdom
- Director: Sophie Neuburg
- Employees: 7
- Website: medact.org

Medact is a British non-profit organisation and registered charity, whose mission is "to support health professionals from all disciplines to work together towards a world in which everyone can truly achieve and exercise their human right to health".

Medact was formed in 1992 following the merger of the Medical Association for the Prevention of War (MAPW) and the Medical Campaign Against Nuclear Weapons (MCANW). Following the merger of these not-for-profit medical peace organisations, Medact broadened its mission to include the health threats posed by climate change and economic inequality.

Medact is affiliated with International Physicians for the Prevention of Nuclear War.

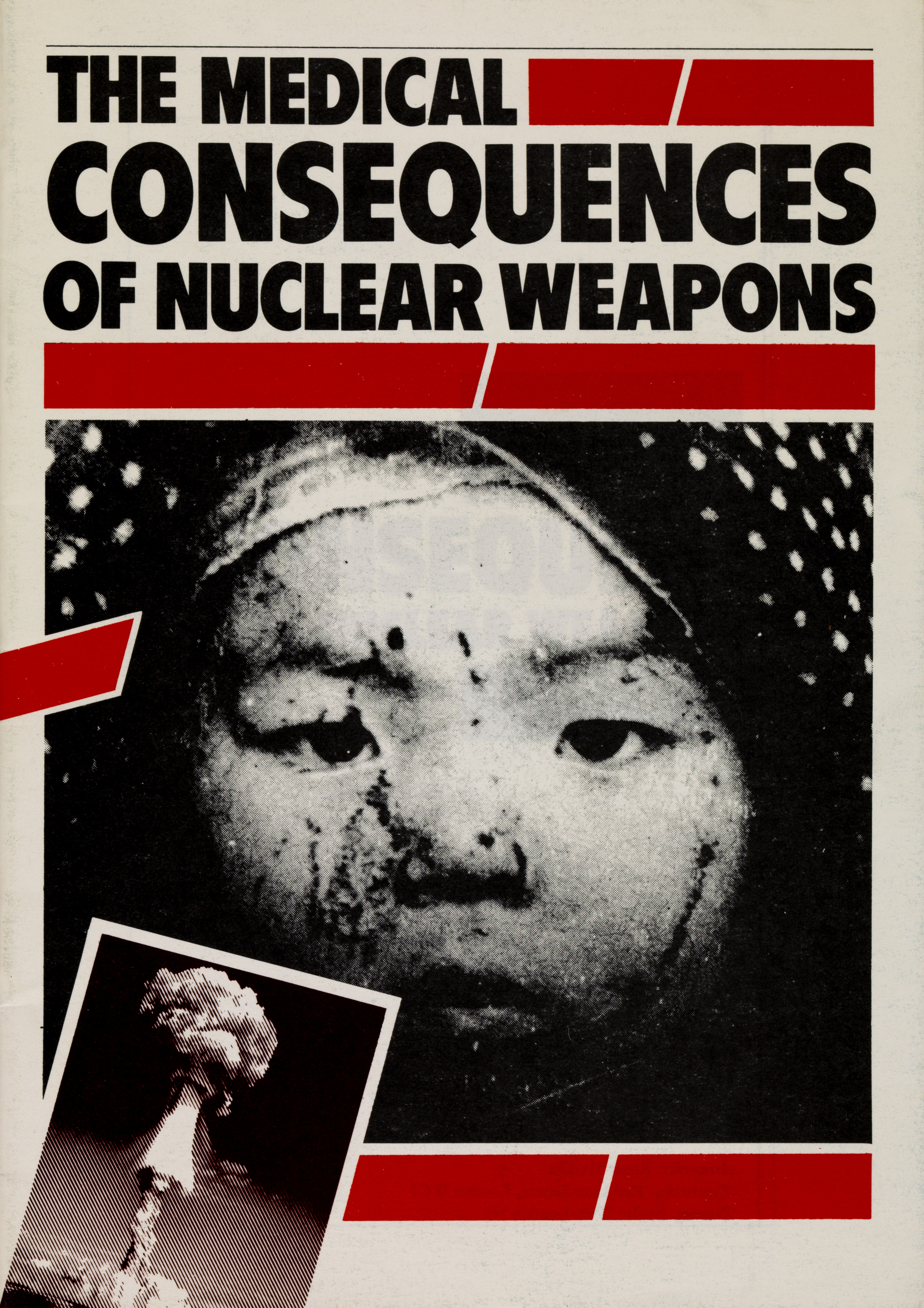
Pamphlet: The medical consequences of nuclear war

== Notable work ==
Between 2001 and 2012, Medact produced a number of reports on the health impact of the war in Iraq. They have issued three reports and two shorter "updates", have defended the Lancet surveys of casualties of the Iraq War and, as part of the Count the Casualties campaign, have called for an independent investigation into increased mortality in Iraq.

Medact has produced reports documenting the phenomenon of health worker migration from less economically developed nations to rich countries, which they describe as a "perverse subsidy".

Medact also works on the health of refugees and migrants in the UK, in particular documenting and challenging barriers to healthcare.

Medact has been involved in the Global Health Watch, a civil society project aiming to produce alternative versions of the World Health Organization's annual World Health Report.

== See also ==
- Right to health
