= Jean McSorley =

British activist

Jean McSorley (born 1958), also credited as Jean Emery, is a British activist. McSorley was a founding member and secretary of the group CORE – Cumbrians Against a Radioactive Environment – formed to protest the local Sellafield nuclear plant. She then worked for Greenpeace in Australia as a nuclear coordinator. McSorley is also the author of the 1990 book Living in the Shadow: The Story of the People of Sellafield.

== Early life and education ==
McSorley was born in Barrow-in-Furness in Cumbria in England in 1958. Her father was from Scotland near Blantyre. He worked at the Sellafield nuclear plant, as a steel erector, and died in 1962 when she was 4. McSorley attended a convent school. She got married to a Royal Navy engineer and submariner, and got a job as a clerk at the local unemployment office.

== Career and activism ==
Following a Greenpeace meeting, McSorley became a founding member of the group "Cumbrians Against a Radioactive Environment" (CORE), formed to protest the local Sellafield nuclear plant. McSorley was an activist with CORE from 1980-1990. She served as the groups's campaign secretary. She also advised other groups in Billingham and in Germany.

In February 1990, McSorley left England to live in Canberra, Australia where she had a job with Greenpeace. When she left, the Whitehaven News said "It takes a special kind of courage to stand up to the mighty and while there will always be a debate about the effectiveness of her campaigning [...] the Jean McSorleys of this world are necessary [...] Let us hope her successor is equally vigilant."

She was the senior anti-nuclear campaigner for Greenpeace in the 2000s. She then worked as an independent consultant to Greenpeace and other NGOs.

McSorley wrote the book Living in the Shadow: The Story of the People of Sellafield in 1990. The book contained first hand accounts of cancer victims in the local area.

== Critical reception ==
Of her book, the North West Evening Mail said "Jean McSorley's book has been crticised for being anecdotal [...] Living in the Shadow provides compelling evidence against Sellafield using the personal recollections of workers and relatives of cancer victims [...] You can not fail to be moved by the interviews [...] It is [...] a sober – yet undoubtedly biased – and well-researched book.

Of her book, the New Scientist said "She has produced a clear account, in consistently plain language, of what it is like to be ‘the people of Sellafield’. The strongest parts of the book are taken directly from interviews with the plant’s neighbours and workers, taking in its supporters and opponents and those simply grieving."

For its part, the Lincolnshire Echo said "This is not a book you can dip into and it is not a cheerful read. But at a time when environmental issues are to the fore it should be on every concerned citizen's and on every politician's reading list."

The Manchester Evening News said "Her moving book highlights the frightening leukæmia rate among local children, the discharges into the Irish Sea, and the beaches where birds won't breed."

== Works ==
==== Books ====
- McSorley, Jean (1990). Living in the Shadow: The Story of the People of Sellafield. Pan Macmillan. ISBN 9780330313315.
- McSorley, Jean (30 May 2025). Mud, Mayhem & Moneymen: The Making of Barrow Town 1840-1890. District Lands. ISBN 978-1913898960.

==== Articles ====
- Emery, Jean (April–May 1986). "Sellafield Saga: A litany of bad management and cover-ups" (PDF). SCRAM: The Anti Nuclear & Safe Energy Journal (53): 14–15.
- McSorley, Jean (12 May 1989). "This Problem Must not be Dumped on Cumbria". The Westmorland Gazette. p. 17.
- McSorley, Jean (10 October 2007). "Contaminated evidence". The Guardian.
- McSorley, Jean (7 April 2009). "A staggering waste of taxpayers' money". The Independent (Commentary).
