= World Nuclear Industry Status Report =

- 2013 report
- Author: Mycle Schneider; Antony Froggatt; Julie Hazemann; Tadahiro Katsuta; Amory B. Lovins; Christian von Hirschhausen
- Subject: Nuclear power industry
- Genre: Non-fiction

The World Nuclear Industry Status Report is a yearly report on the nuclear power industry. It is produced by Mycle Schneider, an anti-nuclear activist and a founding member of WISE-Paris, which he directed from 1983 to 2003.

== 2019 Report ==
The 2019 report reached the conclusion that 'Stabilizing the climate is urgent, nuclear power is slow. [Nuclear power] meets no technical or operational need that these low-carbon competitors [wind, solar and other renewable energy] cannot meet better, cheaper, and faster. Even sustaining economically distressed reactors saves less carbon per dollar and per year than reinvesting its avoidable operating cost (let alone its avoidable new subsidies) into cheaper efficiency and renewables.' The report also reached the conclusion that small modular reactors are unlikely to play any significant role in the future energy landscape.

== 2017 Data-visualization tool ==
In January an interactive visualization on nuclear power construction was launched. This contains information on the 754 reactors that are or have been under-construction since 1951. The Global Nuclear Power Database is hosted by the Bulletin of the Atomic Scientists.

== 2016 report ==
As of the middle of 2016, 31 countries were operating nuclear reactors for energy purposes. Nuclear power plants generated 2,441 net terawatt-hours (TWh or billion kilowatt-hours) of electricity in 2015, a 1.3 percent increase over the output the previous year.

== 2015 report ==
Globally, the nuclear industry's situation continued to deteriorate in 2015, except in China. Eight out of the ten nuclear power reactor startups in 2015 were in China.

== 2013 report ==
Written by Mycle Schneider and Antony Froggatt with contributions of four other experts from Japan, the UK and France, says that the nuclear industry was struggling with grave problems prior to the Fukushima accident, but that the impact of the accident has become increasingly visible. Global electricity generation from nuclear plants dropped by a historic 7 percent in 2012, adding to the record drop of 4 percent in 2011.

The 427 operating reactors worldwide, as of 1 July 2013, are 17 lower than the peak in 2002. The nuclear share in the world's power generation declined steadily from a historic peak of 17 percent in 1993 to about 10 percent in 2012. The report details a range of restart scenarios for Japan's nuclear reactor fleet which, as of September 2013, were all shutdown. Nuclear power's share of global commercial primary energy production plunged to 4.5 percent, a level last seen in 1984.

Besides an extensive update on nuclear economics, the report also includes an assessment of the major challenges at the Fukushima nuclear site, in particular the highly contaminated water on site. This water contained in the basement of reactors and in storage tanks contains 2.5 times the total amount of caesium-137 released at the Chernobyl accident.

The report says that China, Germany and Japan, three of the world's four largest economies, as well as India, now generate more power from renewables than from nuclear power. For the first time in 2012 China and India generated more power from wind alone than from nuclear plants, while in China solar electricity generation grew by 400 percent in one year.

== 2010–11 report ==
The World Nuclear Industry Status Report 2010-2011 is authored by Mycle Schneider, Antony Froggatt, and Steve Thomas and published by the Washington-based Worldwatch Institute. The foreword is written by Amory Lovins.

According to the report, the international nuclear industry has been unable to stop the slow decline of nuclear energy. The world's reactor fleet is aging quickly and not enough new units are coming online. As of April 1, 2011, there were 437 nuclear reactors operating in the world, which was seven fewer than in 2002. The Olkiluoto plant has had particular problems:

The flagship EPR project at Olkiluoto in Finland, managed by the largest nuclear builder in the world, AREVA NP, has turned into a financial fiasco. The project is four years behind schedule and at least 90 percent over budget, reaching a total cost estimate of €5.7 billion ($8.3 billion) or close to €3,500 ($5,000) per kilowatt.

The report says that the Fukushima Daiichi nuclear disaster is exacerbating many of the problems that nuclear energy is facing. There is "no obvious sign that the international nuclear industry could eventually turn empirically evident downward trend into a promising future", and the Fukushima nuclear disaster is likely to accelerate the decline. With long lead times of 10 years and more, it will be difficult to maintain, let alone increase, the number of operating nuclear power plants over the next 20 years. Moreover, says the report, it is clear that nuclear power development cannot keep up with the pace of renewable energy commercialization. For the first time, in 2010 total installed nuclear power capacity in the world (375 gigawatts) fell behind aggregate installed capacity (381 GW) of three specific renewables — wind turbines (193 GW), biomass and waste-to-energy plants (65 GW), and solar power (43 GW).

== 2009 report ==
The World Nuclear Industry Status Report 2009 presents quantitative and qualitative information on the nuclear power plants in operation, under construction and in planning phases throughout the world. A detailed analyses of the economic performance of past and current nuclear projects is also given. The report was commissioned by the German Federal Ministry of Environment, Nature Conservation and Reactor Safety.

== 2008 report ==
The World Nuclear Industry Status Report 2008 focused on the difficulties facing nuclear power throughout the world, with particular reference to Western Europe and Asia.

== 2007 report ==
The World Nuclear Industry Status Report 2007 was commissioned by the Greens-EFA Group in the European Parliament.

== Earlier reports ==
The first World Nuclear Industry Status Report was issued in 1992 in a joint publication with WISE-Paris, Greenpeace International and the World Watch Institute, Washington. The second report in 2004 was commissioned by the Greens-EFA Group in the European Parliament.

== See also ==
- International Atomic Energy Agency
- Nuclear energy policy
- Nuclear renaissance
- Nuclear power in France
- Nuclear power in China
