= Antony Froggatt =

Antony Froggatt is an energy policy consultant and a senior research fellow at Chatham House. He is co-author of The World Nuclear Industry Status Reports.

== Biography ==
Antony Froggatt is a senior research fellow in the Energy, Environment and Development Programme at Chatham House and has been a freelance energy policy consultant since 1997, based in London. Previously, he was the Greenpeace International Nuclear Policy Campaigner.

== Recent work ==
With Mycle Schneider, Froggatt is co-author of The World Nuclear Industry Status Reports, which suggest that nuclear power will continue to decline. Froggatt and Schneider wrote the Systems for Change report for the Heinrich Böll Foundation in 2010. Froggatt has commented extensively on the 2011 Japanese nuclear accidents. He says "that the cascade of problems at Fukushima, from one reactor to another, and from reactors to fuel storage pools, will affect the design, layout and ultimately the cost of future nuclear plants".

== See also ==
- Energy Fair
- Anti-nuclear movement
- Non-nuclear future
- Nuclear renaissance
- Amory Lovins
