= Marjorie Thompson =

American biologist (1954–2014)

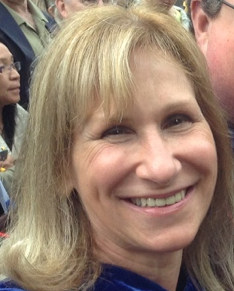
Marjorie Thompson at the Brown University Commencement 2014

Marjorie Ellen Thompson (January 31, 1954 – September 15, 2014) was an American biologist and musician who served as Associate Dean of Biological Sciences at Brown University.

Thompson received a ScB in biochemistry and a PhD in biology from Brown, in 1974 and 1979 respectively, and was appointed Associate Dean of Biological Sciences in 1983, a position she continued to hold until her death in 2014. Her awards as Associate Dean included the Barrett Hazeltine Senior Class Citation in 1994 and 1996, the Onyx Award in 1998 and the Dean’s Award for Excellence in Undergraduate Teaching and Advising in 2009. Outside of her work as an academic, Thompson also worked as a guitarist and singer-songwriter, releasing four albums, playing with Jorma Kaukonen, and appearing on The Oprah Winfrey Show as part of an episode about "women who are changing the definition of middle age".
