= List of women pacifists and peace activists =

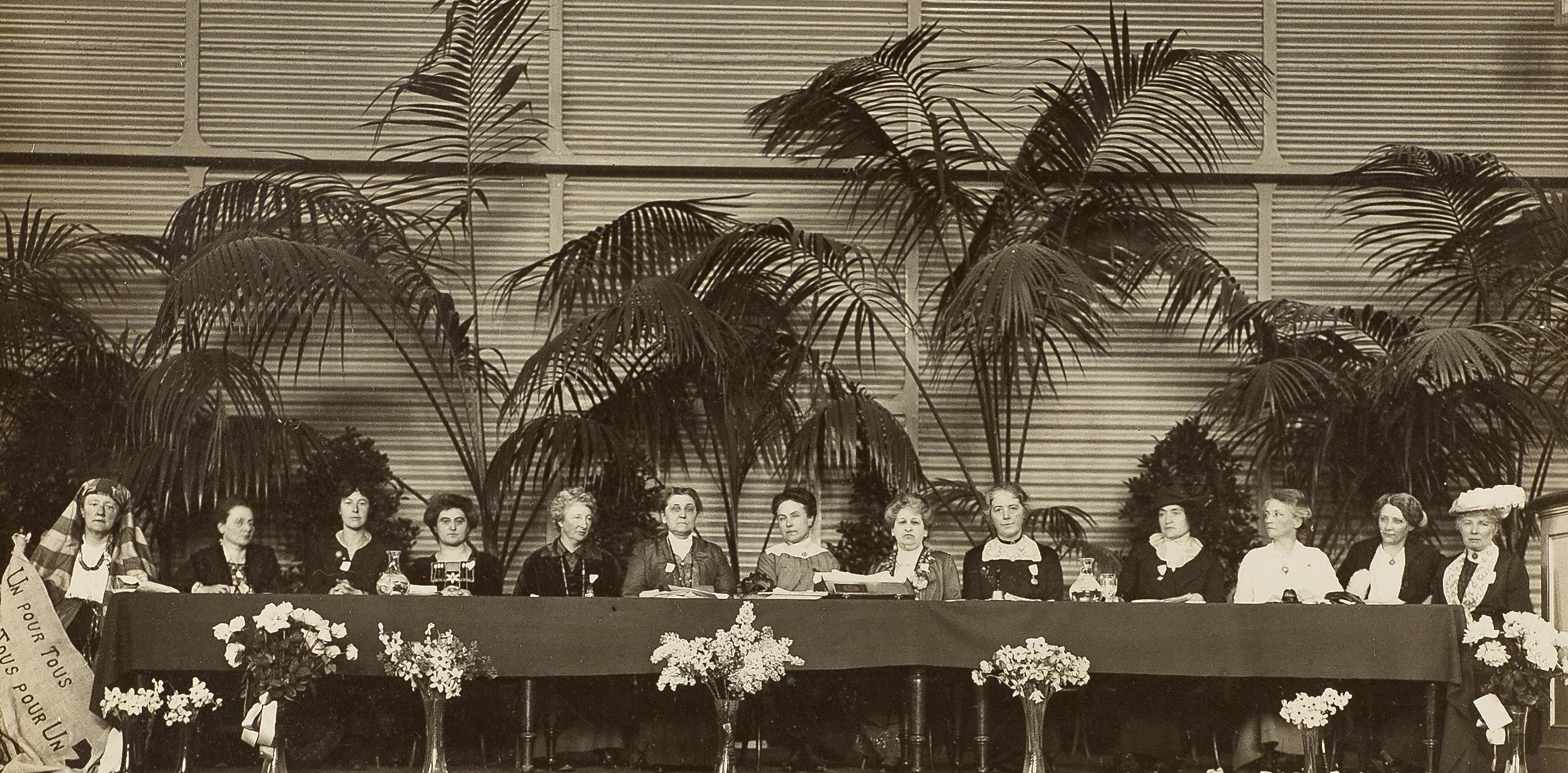
International Congress of Women in 1915. left to right:1. Lucy Thoumaian - Armenia, 2. Leopoldine Kulka, 3. Laura Hughes - Canada, 4. Rosika Schwimmer - Hungary, 5. Anita Augspurg - Germany, 6. Jane Addams - USA, 7. Eugénie Hamer - Belgium, 8. Aletta Jacobs - Netherlands, 9. Chrystal Macmillan - UK, 10. Rosa Genoni - Italy, 11. Anna Kleman - Sweden, 12. Thora Daugaard - Denmark, 13. Louise Keilhau - Norway

This is a list of women pacifists and peace activists by nationality – notable women who are well known for their work in promoting pacifism.

== Introduction ==
Women have been active in peace movements since at least the 19th century. After the First World War broke out in 1914, many women's organizations became involved in peace activities. In 1915, the International Congress of Women in the Hague brought together representatives from women's associations in several countries, leading to the establishment of the Women's International League for Peace and Freedom. This in turn led to national chapters which continued their work in the 1920s and 1930s. After the Second World War, European women once again became involved in peace initiatives, mainly as a result of the Cold War, while from the 1960s the Vietnam War led to renewed interest in the United States.

== Afghanistan ==
- Palwasha Hassan (born 1969) – Afghan women's rights and peace activist and former politician
- Malalai Joya (born 1978) – Afghan activist, writer, and a politician dismissed from the National Assembly of Afghanistan for publicly denouncing the presence of warlords and war criminals in the Afghan Parliament

== Albania ==
- Sevim Arbana (born 1951) – Albanian women's rights activist and founder of "Women Bridge for Peace and Understanding”

== Angola ==
- Eunice Nangueve Inácio (born 1948) – Angolan peace activist

== Argentina ==
- Alicia Moreau de Justo (1885–1986) – Argentine physician, politician, pacifist and human rights activist

== Armenia ==
- Lucy Thoumaian (1890–1940) – Armenian women's rights and peace activist

== Australia ==
- Eva Bacon (1909–1994) – Australian socialist, feminist and pacifist
- Doris Blackburn (1889–1970) – Australian social reformer, politician and pacifist
- Helen Caldicott (born 1938) – Australian physician, anti-nuclear activist, revived Physicians for Social Responsibility, campaigner against the dangers of radiation
- Stella Cornelius (1919-2010) – Australian businesswoman and peace activist
- Margaret Holmes, AM (1909–2009) – Australian activist during the Vietnam War, member Anglican Pacifist Fellowship
- Zohl de Ishtar – Irish-Australian sociologist, anti-nuclear activist and feminist
- Amelia Lambrick (1864–1956) – Australian public servant and pacifist
- Isabel Longworth (1881–1961) – Australian dentist and peace activist
- Evelyn Masterman AM (1907–2014), Australian peace activist and parliamentary librarian
- Nancy Shelley OAM (1926–2010) – Quaker who represented the Australian peace movement at the UN in 1982
- Barbara Grace Tucker – Australian peace activist, long time participant of London's Parliament Square Peace Campaign
- Jo Vallentine (born 1946) – Australian politician and peace activist
- Kathleen Deery de Phelps (1908–2001) – conservationist, philanthropist

== Austria ==
- Hildegard Goss-Mayr (born 1930) – Austrian pacifist and theologian
- Yella Hertzka (1873–1948) – Austrian peace and women's rights activist
- Leopoldine Kulka (1872–1920) – Austrian writer, editor and pacifist
- Helene Lecher (1865–1929) – Austrian pacifist and philanthropist
- Olga Misař (1876–1950) – Austrian peace activist, feminist and writer
- Helene Scheu-Riesz (1880–1970), peace activist, children's writer, publisher
- Bertha von Suttner (1843–1914) – Czech-Austrian pacifist, first woman Nobel peace laureate

== Belgium ==
- Isabelle Blume (1892–1975)– Belgian left wing politician, attended of the World Peace Council
- Eugénie Hamer (1865–after 1926) – Belgian peace activist, editor and writer
- Germaine Marie-Thérèse Hannevart (1887–1977) – Belgian teacher and peace campaigner
- Léonie La Fontaine (1857–1949) – Belgian feminist and pacifist

== Bosnia and Herzegovina ==
- Velma Šarić (born 1979) – Bosnian journalist, founder and president of the Post-Conflict Research Center
- Suvada Selimović (born 1965) – Bosnian pacifist who works to promote mutual aid between women and for those responsible for the crimes of the Bosnian War to be brought to justice

== Botswana ==
- Lydia Nyati-Ramahobo (1957–2025) – Botswana linguistic scholar and language activist
- Malebogo Molefhe (born c.1980) – Botswana activist against gender-based violence

== Brazil ==
- Elisa Branco (1912–2001) – Brazilian communist and peace activist, awarded with the Lenin Peace Prize
- Therezinha Zerbini (1928–2015) – Brazilian attorney and feminist leader, founded the Women's Movement for Amnesty in Brazil

== Bulgaria ==
- Ekaterina Karavelova (1860–1947) – Bulgarian educator, writer, suffragist, feminist, pacifist

== Canada ==
- Edith Ballantyne (1922–2025) – Czech-Canadian peace activist
- Christine Ross Barker (1866–1940) – Canadian pacifist and suffragist
- Alice Amelia Chown (1866–1949) – Canadian feminist, pacifist and writer
- Muriel Duckworth (1908–2009) – Canadian pacifist, feminist and community activist, founder of Nova Scotia Voice of Women for Peace
- Mildred Fahrni (1900–1992) – Canadian pacifist, feminist, internationally active in the peace movement
- Ursula Franklin (1921–2016) – German-Canadian scientist, pacifist and feminist, whose research helped end atmospheric nuclear testing
- Rae Luckock (1893–1972) – Canadian feminist, peace activist and politician
- Simonne Monet-Chartrand (1919–1993) – Canadian women's rights activist, feminist, pacifist
- Alaa Murabit (born 1989) – Libyan-Canadian physician and human rights advocate for inclusive peace and security
- Harriet Dunlop Prenter (fl. 1921) – Canadian feminist, pacifist
- Setsuko Thurlow (born 1932) – Japanese-Canadian non-nuclear weapon activist, figure of International Campaign to Abolish Nuclear Weapons
- Julia Grace Wales (1881–1957) – Canadian academic and pacifist

== Chile ==
- Nicolasa Quintremán (1939-2013) – Chilean Pehuenche activist

== Colombia ==
- Yolanda Becerra (born 1959) – Colombian feminist and peace activist.

== Costa Rica ==
- Olga Bianchi (1924–2015) – feminist, pacifist and women's rights activist

== Cyprus ==
- Katherine Clerides (born 1949) – Cypriot peace activist.

== Denmark ==
- Matilde Bajer (1840–1934) – Danish feminist and peace activists
- Henriette Beenfeldt (1878–1949) – Danish radical and peace activist
- Gita Brooke (1931–2020) – born in Denmark (in New Zealand since 1987)
- Benny Cederfeld de Simonsen (1865–1952) – Danish peace activist
- Henriette Crone (1874–1933) – trade unionist, peace activist and politician
- Thora Daugaard (1874–1951) – Danish feminist, pacifist, journal editor and translator
- Annelise Ebbe (1950–2020) – Danish peace activist and translator
- Henni Forchhammer (1863–1955) – Danish educator, feminist and pacifist
- Eline Hansen (1859–1919) – Danish feminist and peace activist
- Estrid Hein (1873–1956) – Danish ophthalmologist, women's rights activist and pacifist
- Ellen Hørup (1871–1953) – Danish writer, pacifist and women's rights activist
- Johanne Meyer (1838–1915) – pioneering Danish suffragist, pacifist and journal editor
- Eva Moltesen (1871–1934) – Finnish-Danish writer and peace activist
- Camilla Nielsen (1856–1932) – Danish philanthropist, feminist and peace activist
- Louise Nørlund (1854–1919) – Danish feminist and peace activist
- Voldborg Ølsgaard (1877–1939) – Danish peace and women's rights activist
- Clara Tybjerg (1864–1941) – Danish feminist, peace activist and educator
- Louise Wright (1861–1935) – Danish philanthropist, feminist and peace activist
- Else Zeuthen (1897–1975) – Danish peace activist, feminist and politician

== Finland ==
- Maikki Friberg (1861–1927) – Finnish educator, journal editor, suffragist and peace activist.
- Lucina Hagman (1853–1946) – Finnish feminist, politician, pacifist.
- Helena Kekkonen (1926–2014), Finnish peace activist and peace educator.

== France ==
- Marcelle Capy (1891–1962) – French novelist, journalist, pacifist
- Bernadette Cattanéo (1899-1963) – French trade unionist, communist activist, newspaper editor, magazine co-founder
- Fanny Clar (1875-1944) – French journalist and writer
- Gabrielle Duchêne (1870–1954) – French feminist and pacifist
- Solange Fernex (1934–2006) – French peace activist and politician
- Suzanne Grinberg (1899–1972) – French lawyer, pacifist, suffragist and writer
- France Hamelin (1918–2007) – French artist, peace activist and resistance worker
- Germaine Malaterre-Sellier (1889–1967) – French nurse, suffragist and pacifist
- Jeanne Mélin (1877–1964) – French pacifist, feminist, writer and politician
- Maria Pognon (1844–1925) – French writer, feminist, suffragist and pacifist
- Marie-Louise Puech-Milhau (1876–1966) – French pacifist, feminist and journal editor
- Colette Reynaud (1872–1965) – French feminist, socialist and pacifist journalist
- Jane Valbot (1884–1961), French pacifist and suffragist
- Madeleine Vernet (1878–1949) – French educator, writer and pacifist

== Germany ==
- Anita Augspurg (1857–1943) – German lawyer, writer, feminist, pacifist
- Gertrud Baer (1890–1981) – German Jewish peace activist, and a founding member of the Women's International League for Peace and Freedom
- Hedwig Dohm (1831–1919) – German feminist, writer, pacifist
- Anna B. Eckstein (1868–1947) – German advocate of world peace
- Anna Edinger (1863–1929) – German social activist, women's rights campaigner and peace activist
- Lida Gustava Heymann (1868–1943) – German feminist, pacifist and women's rights activist
- Petra Kelly (1947–1992) – German politician, feminist, pacifist
- Annette Kolb (1870–1967) – German writer and pacifist
- Rosa Luxemburg (1871–1919) – German marxist and anti–war activist.
- Renate Riemeck (1920–2003) – German historian and Christian peace activist
- Sophie Scholl (1921–1943) – German Christian pacifist, active in the White Rose non-violent resistance movement in Nazi Germany
- Margarethe Lenore Selenka (1860–1922) – German zoologist, feminist and pacifist
- Clara Zetkin (1857–1933) – German Maxist, feminist and pacifist

== Guatemala ==
- Rigoberta Menchú (born 1959) – Guatemalan indigenous rights, anti-war, co-founder Nobel Women's Initiative, Nobel Peace Prize recipient

== Hungary ==
- Vilma Glücklich (1872–1927) – Hungarian educator, pacifist and women's rights activist
- Paula Pogány (1884–1982) – Hungarian women's rights activist and pacifist
- Rosika Schwimmer (1877–1948) – Hungarian pacifist, feminist and suffragist

== India ==
- Kirthi Jayakumar (born 1987) – Indian peace activist and gender equality activist, youth peace activist, peace educator and founder of The Red Elephant Foundation
- Gurmehar Kaur (born 1996) – Indian student and peace activist
- Mother Teresa (1910–1997) – Albanian-Indian Roman Catholic nun, missionary, pacifist, Nobel Peace Prize recipient
- Medha Patkar (born 1954) – Indian activist for Tribals and Dalits affected by dam projects
- Manasi Pradhan (born 1962) – Indian activist; founder of Honour for Women National Campaign
- Arundhati Roy (born 1961) – Indian writer, social critic and peace activist

== Iran ==
- Shirin Ebadi (born 1947) – Iranian lawyer, human rights activist, Nobel peace laureate

== Iraq ==
- Nadia Murad (born 1993) – Iraqi human rights activist, Nobel Prize laureate

== Ireland ==
- Caoimhe Butterly (born 1978) – Irish peace and human rights activist
- Helen Chenevix (1886–1963) – Irish suffragist, trade unionist, pacifist
- Molly Childers (1875–1964) – Irish writer, nationalist, pacifist
- Margaretta D'Arcy (1934–2025) – Irish actress, writer and peace activist
- Adi Roche (born 1955) – Irish activist, chief executive of the charity Chernobyl Children International
- Lilian Stevenson (1870–1960) – Irish peace activist and historiographer

== Israel ==
- Marcia Freedman (born 1938) – American-Israeli peace activist, feminist and supporter of gay rights
- Dahlia Ravikovitch (1936–2005) – Israeli poet and peace activist
- Hagar Rublev (1954–2000) – Israeli peace activist, founder of Women in Black
- Ada Yonath (1939–2026) – Israeli Laureate of the Nobel Prize in Chemistry, 2009, pacifist

== Italy ==
- Elisa Agnini Lollini (1858–1922) – pioneering Italian feminist, pacifist, suffragist and politician
- Cora di Brazza (1862-1944) – designer of the peace flag, pacifist
- Alma Dolens (1869–1948) –pacifist, suffragist, journalist
- Alaide Gualberta Beccari (1842–1906) – Italian feminist, pacifist and social reformer
- Rosa Genoni (1867–1954) – Italian fashion designer, feminist, pacifist
- Linda Malnati (1855–1921) – influential women's rights activist, trade unionist, suffragist, pacifist and writer
- Virginia Tango Piatti (1869–1958) – writer and pacifist, WILPF delegate
- Graziella Sonnino (born 1884) – feminist and peace activist
- Ida Vassalini (1891–1953) – chair of the Milanese WILPF chapter from 1922 to 1927

== Ivory Coast ==
- Aya Virginie Toure – Ivorian peace activist, proponent of non-violent resistance

== Japan ==
- Atsuko Betchaku (1960–2017) – pacifist and educator
- Marii Hasegawa (1918–2012) – Japanese peace activist
- Raichō Hiratsuka (1886–1971) – Japanese writer, political activist, feminist, pacifist
- Tano Jōdai (1886–1982) – Japanese English literature professor, peace activist and university president
- Nahoko Takada (1905–1991) – Japanese educator, pacifist and politician
- Mutsuko Miki (1917–2012) – Japanese pacifist and advocate for official compensation for comfort women
- Fumiko Nakamura (1913–2013) – Japanese teacher and anti-war activist
- Shina Inoue Kan (1899–1982) – Japanese academic, women's rights activist and pacifist
- Suzuko Numata (1923–2011) – Japanese peace activist and a survivor of the atomic bombing of Hiroshima
- Toshi Maruki (1912–2000) – Japanese printer and anti-war activist
- Yosano Akiko (1878–1942) – Japanese writer, feminist, pacifist

== Kenya ==
- Dekha Ibrahim Abdi (1964–2011) – Kenyan peace activist
- Grace Lolim – Kenyan human rights and peace activist, former chair of the Isiolo Peace Committee
- Wangari Maathai (1940–2011) – Kenyan environmental activist, Nobel peace laureate

== Liberia ==
- Mary Brownell (1929–2017) – Liberian peace activist who mobilised women to engage in the peacebuilding process following the Liberian Civil Wars
- Etweda Cooper – Liberian politician and peace activist
- Comfort Freeman – Liberian anti-war activist
- Leymah Gbowee (born 1972) – Liberian peace activist, organizer of women's peace movement in Liberia, awarded 2011 Nobel Peace Prize
- Ellen Johnson Sirleaf (born 1938) – President of Liberia, shared 2011 Nobel Peace Prize with Tawakkol Karman and Leymah Gbowee in recognition of "their non-violent struggle for the safety of women and for women's rights to full participation in peace-building work"

== Lithuania ==
- Gabrielle Radziwill (1877–1968) – Lithuanian pacifist, feminist and League of Nations official

== Myanmar ==
- Aung San Suu Kyi (born 1945) – Burmese politician, author, Nobel Peace Prize recipient

== Netherlands ==
- Mia Boissevain (1878–1959) – Dutch zoologist, feminist and pacifist
- Suze Groeneweg (1875–1940) – Dutch politician, feminist and pacifist
- Aletta Jacobs (1854–1929) – Dutch physician, feminist and peace activist
- Rosa Manus (1881–1942) – Dutch pacifist and suffragist
- Adrienne van Melle-Hermans (1931–2007) – Dutch peace activist
- Selma Meyer (1890–1941) – Dutch pacifist and resistance fighter of Jewish origin
- Cornelia Ramondt-Hirschmann (1871–1957) – Dutch teacher, feminist and pacifist
- Titia van der Tuuk (1854–1939) – Dutch feminist and pacifist
- Krista van Velzen (born 1974) – Dutch politician, pacifist and antimilitarist
- Mien van Wulfften Palthe (1875–1960) – Dutch feminist, suffragist and pacifist

== New Zealand ==
- Millicent Baxter (1888–1984) – peace activist
- Gita Brooke (1931–2020) – born in Denmark in New Zealand since 1987
- Sonja Davies (1923–2005) – New Zealand trade unionist, peace campaigner, and Member of Parliament
- Kate Dewes (born 1954) – New Zealand disarmament activist, pacifist
- Maire Leadbeater (born 1945) – New Zealand human rights and peace activist, writer, and social worker
- Elsie Locke (1912–2001), New Zealand communist, historian and activist, co-founded the New Zealand branch of the Campaign for Nuclear Disarmament
- Kae Miller (1910–1994) – peace activist, pacifist, mental health advocate
- Margaret Sievwright (1844–1905) – feminist, peace activist
- Miriam Soljak (1879–1971) – New Zealand feminist, rights activist and pacifist

== Norway ==
- Elise M. Boulding (1920–2010) – Norwegian-born American sociologist, specialising in academic peace research
- Gunhild Emanuelsen (1914–2006) – pacifist, women's rights activist
- Ingrid Fiskaa (born 1977) – Norwegian politician and peace activist
- Louise Keilhau (1860–1927) – peace activist, educator
- Martha Larsen Jahn (1875–1954) – Norwegian peace activist and feminist
- Louise Keilhau (1860–1927) – Norwegian teacher and pacifist
- Sigrid Helliesen Lund (1892–1987) – Norwegian peace activist
- Guri Tambs-Lyche (1917–2008) – Norwegian women's rights activist and pacifist
- Ida Wedel-Jarlsberg (1855–1929) – peace activist, feminist, artist

== Pakistan ==
- Malala Yousafzai (born 1997) – Pakistani education activist, Nobel Prize laureate

== Palau ==
- Gabriela Ngirmang (1922–2007) – Palauan peace and anti-nuclear activist

== Serbia ==
- Katarina Bogdanović (1885 – 1969) – Serbian teacher, women's rights activist, and writer
- Zorica Jevremović (born 1948) – Serbian playwright, theatre director, peace activist
- Nataša Kandić (born 1946) – human rights and anti-war activist
- Lepa Mladjenovic (born 1954) – anti-war activist, feminist

== South Africa ==
- Elizabeth Maria Molteno (1852–1927) – women's rights and peace activist
- Olive Schreiner (1855–1920) – writer and anti-war campaigner
- Julia Solly (1862–1953) – British-born South African suffragist, feminist, pacifist
- Nozizwe Madlala-Routledge (born 1952) activist, politician and Quaker

== Spain ==
- Gladys del Estal (1956–1979) – Spanish ecological activist, shot dead by the Guardia Civil at a protest against the Lemóniz Nuclear Power Plant and the Bardenas firing range
- Carmen Magallón (born 1951) – Spanish physicist, pacifist, conducting research in support of women's advancement in science and peace
- Concepción Picciotto (1936–2016) – Spanish-born anti-nuclear and anti-war protester, White House Peace Vigil

== Sweden ==
- Andrea Andreen (1888–1972) – Swedish physician, pacifist and feminist
- Sonja Branting-Westerståhl (1890–1981) – Swedish lawyer and politician
- Emilia Broomé (1866–1925) – Swedish politician, feminist and peace activist
- Siri Derkert (1888–1973) – Swedish artist, pacifist and feminist
- Greta Engkvist (1893–1990) – Swedish peace activist and educator
- Beatrice Fihn (born 1982) – Swedish anti-nuclear activist, chairperson of International Campaign to Abolish Nuclear Weapons
- Kerstin Grebäck (born 1942) – Swedish peace actiist
- Ann-Margret Holmgren (1850–1940) – Swedish writer, feminist and pacifist
- Anna Kleman (1862–1940) – Swedish suffragist and peace activist
- Elisabeth Krey-Lange (1878–1965) – journalist, women's rights activist and pacifist
- Agda Montelius (1850–1920) – Swedish philanthropist, feminist, peace activist
- Alva Myrdal (1902–1986) – Swedish sociologist, politician, pacifist, Nobel Peace Prize recipient
- Anna T. Nilsson (1869–1947), educator, peace activist
- Vera Nilsson (1888–1979), painter and peace activist
- Betty Olsson (1871–1950), suffragist and peace activist
- Rosalinde von Ossietzky-Palm (1919–2000), German-born Nazi emigrant and pacifist
- Ellen Palmstierna (1869–1941), Swedish women's rights and peace activist
- Annika Söder (born 1955), Swedish politician, diplomat and pacifist
- Sofia Elisabet Spångberg (1898–1992), Swedish peace activist
- Gunhild Tegen (1889–1970), writer, translator, pacifist
- Matilda Widegren (1863–1938), educator and committed peace activist

== Switzerland ==
- Élisabeth Decrey Warner (born 1953) – Swiss peace activist, founder of Geneva Call
- Laurence Deonna (born 1937) –Swiss writer and peace activist
- Marguerite Gobat (1870–1937) – Swiss editor, teacher and pacifist
- Idy Hegnauer (1909–2006) – Swiss nurse and peace activist
- Klara Honegger (1860–1940) – Swiss suffragist and pacifist activist
- Émilie de Morsier (1843–1896) – Swiss feminist, pacifist and abolitionist
- Clara Ragaz (1874–1957) – Swiss pacifist and feminist
- Elisabeth Rotten (1882–1964) – German-born Swiss peace activist and education reformer
- Annelise Rüegg (1879–1934) – Swiss pacifist, communist and writer
- Helene Stähelin (1891–1970) – Swiss mathematician, teacher and peace activist
- Camille Vidart (1854–1930) – Swiss educator, women's rights activist and pacifist
- Gertrud Woker (1878–1968) – Swiss biochemist, toxicologist and peace activist, campaigned against the use of poison gas in warfare.

== Trinidad and Tobago ==
- Folade Mutota – Trinidadian politician, arms control expert, and women's rights activist, coordinator of the Caribbean Coalition for Development and the Reduction of Armed Violence (CDRAV)

== United Kingdom ==
- Diane Abbott (born 1953), Independent Member of Parliament (MP) and Stop the War Coalition patron
- Ruth Adler (1944–1994) – feminist, and human rights campaigner in Scotland
- Pat Arrowsmith (1930–2023) – British author and peace campaigner
- Margaret Ashton (1856–1937) – British suffragist, local politician, pacifist
- Meg Beresford (born 1937) – British activist, European Nuclear Disarmament movement
- Janet Bloomfield (1953–2007) – British peace and disarmament campaigner, chair of the Campaign for Nuclear Disarmament
- Brigid Brophy (1929–1995) – British novelist, feminist, pacifist
- Vera Brittain (1893–1970) – British writer, pacifist
- April Carter (1937–2022) – British peace activist, researcher, editor
- Ada Nield Chew (1870–1945) – British suffragist and pacifist
- Louise Christian (born 1952) – British human rights solicitor and Stop the War Coalition Vice-President
- Helena Cobban (born 1952) – British peace activist, journalist, author
- Kathleen Courtney (1878–1974) – British suffragist and pacifist
- Helen Crawfurd (1877–1954) – Scottish suffragette, Communist activist and pacifist
- Karmen Cutler – British anti-nuclear weapon campaigner and member of the Greenham Common peace camp, visited Moscow to meet the vice-president of the Soviet Peace Committee
- Agnes Dollan (1887–1966) – Scottish suffragette, political activist and pacifist
- Peggy Duff (1910–1981) – British peace activist, socialist, founder and first general secretary of CND
- Diana Francis (born 1944) – British peace activist and scholar, former president of the International Fellowship of Reconciliation
- Olive Gibbs (1918–1995) – British politician and anti nuclear weapons activist
- Margaret Hills (1882–1967) – British educator, suffragist, feminist and pacifist
- Emily Hobhouse (1860–1926) – British welfare campaigner
- Kate Hudson (born 1958) – British left-wing political activist and academic; General Secretary of the Campaign for Nuclear Disarmament (CND) and National Secretary of Left Unity; officer of the Stop the War Coalition since 2002
- Kathleen Innes (1883–1967) – British educator, writer, pacifist
- Helen John – British activist, one of the first full-time members of the Greenham Common peace camp
- Rebecca Johnson – British peace activist who founded the Acronym Institute for Disarmament Diplomacy
- Marion Kozak (born 1934) – Polish-born British anti nuclear weapons activist
- Muriel Lester (1885–1968) – British social reformer, pacifist and nonconformist; Ambassador and Secretary for the International Fellowship of Reconciliation; co-founder of the Kingsley Hall
- Chrystal Macmillan (1872–1937) – Scottish politician, feminist, pacifist
- Mairead Maguire (born 1944) – Northern Ireland peace movement, Nobel peace laureate
- Kika Markham (born 1940) – British actress and Stop the War Coalition patron
- Dorothy Moulton Mayer (1886–1974) – English soprano, philanthropist, peace activist and biographer
- Sybil Morrison (1893–1984) – British pacifist active in the Peace Pledge Union
- Betty Papworth (1914–2008) – British communist and anti-war activist, who was a member of the Campaign for Nuclear Disarmament (CND) and Stop the War Coalition
- Marian Cripps, Baroness Parmoor (1878–1952) – British anti-war activist
- Priscilla Hannah Peckover (1833–1931) – English pacifist, nominated four times for the Nobel Peace Prize
- Lindis Percy (born 1941) – British nurse, midwife, pacifist, founder of the Campaign for the Accountability of American Bases (CAAB)
- Madeleine Rees (fl. from 1990s) – British lawyer, human right and peace proponent
- Ellen Robinson (1840–1912) – British peace campaigner
- Isabel Abraham Ross (1885–1964) – British teacher, suffragist, pacifist and biographer
- Ada Salter (1866–1942) – English Quaker, pacifist, a founding member of Women's International League for Peace and Freedom
- Molly Scott Cato (born 1963) – British green economist, Green Party politician, pacifist and anti-nuclear campaigner
- Mary Sheepshanks (1872–1960) – British pacifist, feminist, journalist and social worker
- Myrtle Solomon (1921–1987) – British general secretary of the Peace Pledge Union and Chair of War Resisters International
- Frances Benedict Stewart (fl. 1920s–1950s) – Chilean-born American sociologist, pacifist, feminist and Bahá'í pioneer
- Ada Salter (1866–1942) – English Quaker, pacifist, a founding member of Women's International League for Peace and Freedom
- Ethel Snowden (1881–1951) – British socialist, human rights activist, feminist politician and pacifist
- Sophia Sturge (1849–1936) – British Quaker, social reformer, and pacifist
- Helena Swanwick (1864–1939) – British feminist, suffragist and pacifist
- Kathleen Tacchi-Morris (1899–1993) – British dancer, founder of Women for World Disarmament
- Helen Thomas (1966–1989) – Welsh peace activist, died at Greenham Common Women's Peace Camp
- Sybil Thorndike (1882–1976) – British actress and pacifist; member of the Peace Pledge Union who gave readings for its benefit
- Aethel Tollemache (1875–1955) – British suffragette who became a pacifist, was arrested in London in 1917 (during World War I) for collecting signatures for a peace memorial
- Evelyn Underhill (1875–1941) – English Anglo-Catholic writer and pacifist
- Betty Williams (1943–2020) – Northern Irish pacifist, recipient of the Nobel Peace Prize in 1976
- Lilian Wolfe (1875–1974) – British anarchist, pacifist, feminist
- Angie Zelter (born 1951) – British anti-war and anti-nuclear activist, co-founder of Trident Ploughshares

== United States ==
- Bella Abzug (1920–1998) – American lawyer, politician, social activist and pacifist
- Jane Addams (1860–1935) – American, national chairman of Woman's Peace Party, president of Women's International League for Peace and Freedom, and 1931 Nobel peace laureate.
- Fannie Fern Andrews (1867–1950) – American educator, writer, social worker and pacifist
- Joan Baez (born 1941) – prominent American anti-war protester, inspirational singer
- Ella Baker (1903–1986) – African-American civil rights activist, feminist, pacifist
- Emily Greene Balch (1867–1961) – American pacifist, leader of Women's International League for Peace and Freedom, and 1946 Nobel peace laureate
- Medea Benjamin (born 1952) – American author, organizer, co-founder of the anti-militarist Code Pink
- Elise M. Boulding (1920–2010) – American Quaker sociologist and author, major contributor to creating the academic discipline of Peace and Conflict Studies
- Norma Elizabeth Boyd (1888–1985) – African American politically active educator, children's rights proponent, pacifist
- Heloise Brainerd (1881–1869) – American women activist, pacifist
- Sophonisba Breckinridge (1866–1948) – American educator, social reformer, pacifist
- Olympia Brown (1835–1926) – American theologist, suffragist, pacifist
- Gertrude C. Bussey (1888–1961) – American philosopher, peace activist
- Joan Chittister (born 1936) – American Benedictine nun, prioress, writer, pacifist, co-chair of the Global Peace Initiative of Women
- Judy Collins (born 1939) – inspirational American anti-war singer-songwriter, protester
- Rachel Corrie (1979–2003) – American activist for Palestinian human rights
- Frances Crowe (born 1919) – American pacifist, anti-nuclear power activist, draft counselor supporting conscientious objectors
- Dorothy Day (1897–1980) – American journalist, social activist, and co-founder of the Catholic Worker movement
- Dorothy Detzer (1893–1981) – American feminist, peace activist, U.S. secretary of the Women's International League for Peace and Freedom
- Amanda Deyo (1838–1917) – American Universalist minister, peace activist, correspondent
- Mary Dingman (1875–1961) – American social and peace activist
- Roberta Dunbar (died 1956) – American clubwoman and peace activist
- Crystal Eastman (1881–1928) – American lawyer, suffragist, pacifist, journalist
- Cynthia Enloe (born 1938) – American writer and feminist peace theorist
- Hedy Epstein (1924–2016) – Jewish-American antiwar activist, escaped Nazi Germany on the Kindertransport; active in opposition to Israeli military policies
- Jodie Evans (born 1954) – American political activist, co-founder of Code Pink, filmmaker
- Genevieve Fiore (1912–2002) – American women's rights and peace activist
- Jane Fonda (born 1937) – American anti-war protester, actress
- Elisabeth Freeman (1876–1942) – American suffragist, civil rights activist and pacifist
- Emma Goldman (1869–1940) – Russian/American activist imprisoned in the U.S. for opposition to World War I
- Amy Goodman (born 1957) – American journalist, host of Democracy Now!
- Alice Hamilton (1869–1970) – American physician, toxicologist, humanitarian and peace activist
- Judith Hand (born 1940) – American biologist, pioneer of peace ethology
- Florence Jaffray Harriman (1870–1967) – American suffragist, social reformer, pacifist and diplomat
- Erna P. Harris (1908-1995) – African-American journalist, civil rights and peace activist
- Alice Herz (1882–1965) – German-born American peace activist
- Margaret Isely (1921–1997) – American peace activist and co-founder of WCPA
- Jessie Jack Hooper
- Julia Ward Howe (1819–1910) – American writer, social activist, peace advocate
- Hannah Clothier Hull (1872–1958) – American Quaker activist, in the leadership of WILPF in the US
- Inez Jackson (1907–1993) – African American pacifist and civil rights activist
- Lisa Kalvelage (1923–2009) – German-born American anti-war activist remembered as one of the Napalm ladies
- Helen Keller (1880–1968) – American activist, deafblind writer, speech "Strike Against The War" Carnegie Hall, New York 1916
- Kathy Kelly (born 1952) – American peace and anti-war activist, arrested over 60 times during protests; member and organizer of international peace teams
- Coretta Scott King (1927–2006) – American writer, civil rights leader and pacifist
- Lola Maverick Lloyd (1875–1944) – American pacifist, suffragist, feminist
- Elizabeth McAlister (born 1939) – American former nun, co-founder of Jonah House, peace activist
- Bertha McNeill (1887–1979) – African-American WILPF leader and civil rights activist
- Ava Helen Pauling (1903–1981) – American human rights activist, feminist, pacifist
- Jeannette Rankin (1880–1973) – first woman elected to the U.S. Congress, lifelong pacifist
- Coleen Rowley (born 1954) – ex-FBI agent, whistleblower, peace activist, and the first recipient of the Sam Adams Award
- Cindy Sheehan (born 1957) – American anti-Iraq and anti-Afghanistan war leader
- Jeanmarie Simpson (born 1959) – American feminist, peace activist
- Samantha Smith (1972–1985) – American schoolgirl, young advocate of peace between Soviets and Americans
- Eve Tetaz (born 1931) – retired American teacher, peace and justice activist
- Lillian Wald (1867–1940) – American nurse, writer, human rights activist, suffragist and pacifist
- Mary Wilhelmine Williams (1878–1944) – American historian, feminist and pacifist
- Anita Parkhurst Willcox (1892–1984) – American artist, feminist, pacifist
- Fanny Garrison Villard (1844–1928) – American suffragist and pacifist,
- Alice Walker (born 1944) – American novelist, feminist and pacifist
- Jody Williams (born 1950) – American anti-landmine advocate and organizer, Nobel peace laureate
- Dagmar Wilson (1916–2011) – American illustrator, pacifist, founder of Women Strike for Peace
- Mary Emma Woolley (1863-1947) – American educator, peace activist, sole US female delegate to the Conference on Reduction and Limitation of Armaments

== Venezuela ==
- Sheyene Gerardi – human rights advocate, peace activist, founder of the SPACE Movement

== Yemen ==
- Tawakkol Karman (born 1979) – Yemini journalist, politician and human rights activist; shared 2011 Nobel Peace prize

== See also ==
- List of peace activists
- PeaceWomen Across the Globe
- Women's International League for Peace and Freedom
- List of women's rights activists
