= Bertha McNeill =

American activist and educator (1887–1979)

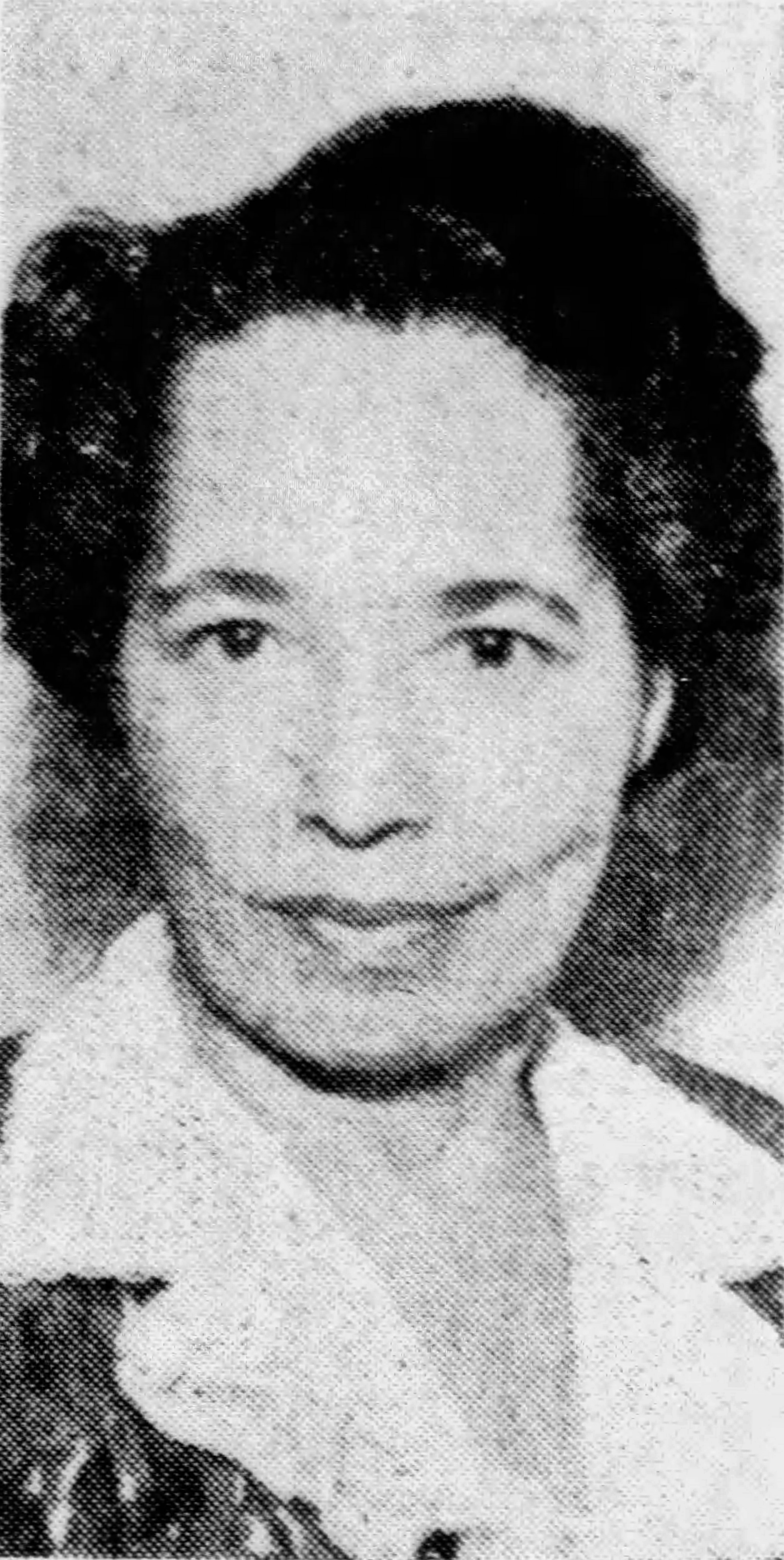
- McNeill in 1948
- Born: Bertha Clay McNeill; November 12, 1887; Southport, North Carolina, U.S.
- Died: September 21, 1979 (aged 91); Washington, D.C., U.S.
- Occupations: Educator; activist
- Years active: 1908–1970s

Bertha Clay McNeill (November 12, 1887 – September 21, 1979) was an American civil rights activist, peace activist, and educator. She grew up in North Carolina and earned a teaching certificate there before moving to Washington, D.C., where she studied at Howard University. During her schooling, she became a member of Alpha Kappa Alpha sorority and the Howard University Women's Club. On graduating in 1908, she briefly taught in Baltimore, before transferring to the District of Columbia Public School System. From 1909 to 1916, she taught at the M Street High School, thereafter at Dunbar High School until 1957, when she became an adjunct professor at Howard. During her teaching career, McNeill was the faculty advisor for Dunbar High School's student newspaper, edited several journals for organizations, and contributed articles to African-American newspapers.

One of the few Black activists who were members of the Women's International League for Peace and Freedom (WILPF), McNeill joined the organization in 1934. The following year, she became chair of its Interracial Committee, later renamed the Committee on Minorities and Race Relations, where she pressed for diversification of membership and recognition of civil rights issues as part of the peace movement. She led the organization to oppose lynching and Jim Crow laws and to adopt policies against scheduling meetings and congresses in segregated facilities while actively supporting school desegregation. She also chaired the Committee on Special Problems of Branches, which was responsible for handling accusations against WILPF and its members under McCarthyism. She served as a national vice president of the U.S. branch of WILPF for at least five terms and represented the national organization as a delegate at four international congresses. In 1954, she became the chair of the Washington, D.C., WILPF section and served in that capacity until 1960. McNeill remained active in the WILPF until her death in 1979.

== Early life and education ==
Bertha Clay McNeill was born on November 12, 1887, in Southport, North Carolina, to Lucy Alice (née Reaves) and Henry Clay McNeill. She was the youngest child in the family which included three sons and four daughters – William, Luther, Oliver, Beulah, Mary, Elizabeth, and Bertha. Henry was a farmer, who worked in North Carolina and Maryland before retiring to Washington, D. C. Bertha attended the Gregory Normal Institute of Wilmington, North Carolina, the first school established in the city that could legally educate Black students. After graduating, she moved to Washington, D.C., in 1905, and furthered her education at Howard University, one of the Black colleges established shortly after the end of the American Civil War. She was a member of Alpha Kappa Alpha sorority, the first Black women's intercollegiate sorority in the United States, which formed in 1908 at Howard, and a charter member of the Howard University Women's Club.

== Career ==
=== Teaching (1908–1961) ===
On graduating from Howard in 1908 with a Bachelor of Arts degree, McNeill began working at the Colored High and Training School in Baltimore, Maryland. She was hired by the District of Columbia Public School System in 1909, teaching a second-grade class until she was transferred to the M Street High School. The first public secondary school for Blacks in Washington, D.C., from 1916 it was renamed Dunbar High School. During her tenure as an English and journalism teacher at the school, McNeill continued her education, taking courses at Columbia University, the University of Chicago, and the Catholic University of America, where she earned a master's degree in 1950. (Note: Although both The Washington Post and Plastas give her graduation with her master's degree as 1945, the school reported it to The Evening Star in 1950.) After retiring from Dunbar in 1957, she taught as an adjunct professor of English and reading at Howard University for four years.

=== Journalism (1916–1969) ===
McNeill was the faculty advisor to Dunbar High School's student newspaper, the Dunbar Advisor. She also wrote articles for the Cape Fear Journal, an African-American newspaper which was founded by her sister Mary's husband, Robert S. Jervay, in 1927. She encouraged her nephew Robert H. McNeill, son of her brother William, to pursue his interest in photojournalism and bought him his first camera. McNeill was editor of the journal of the National Association of College Women, the journal of the U.S. national WILPF section, and also the Lincoln Reporter, a church newspaper of the Lincoln Temple United Church of Christ. From 1964 to 1969, she wrote a regular column for the Wilmington Journal, whose editor at the time was her nephew, Thomas C. Jervay.

== Activism (1910–1960s) ==
In 1910, McNeill, along with women educators including Sara W. Brown, Mary Cromwell, Georgiana Simpson, and Mary Church Terrell, founded the College Alumnae Club, known from April 1923 as the National Association of College Women. That year, McNeill became president of the organization, succeeding Lucy M. Holmes. She was also a member of the League for Industrial Democracy and the Women's Trade Union League. Her activism within various organizations often overlapped, as for example when she fought women having to register for the draft along with her sorority sisters from Alpha Kappa Alpha and other organizations. As chair of the Committee on Public Affairs for the National Association of College Women, she formally wrote to the National Education Association to protest their selection of convention locations that would not allow Black attendees to lodge and required separate food, elevator, entrance, and seating arrangements. She was particularly concerned that although, for example in the Austin-Wadsworth Bill, service placement was proposed to be based on aptitude, racially discriminatory hiring policies would in fact prevent hiring for Black women based on their skills. While staunchly against the war, McNeill noted that the African American community could better contribute to the war effort if policies allowed them equal hiring opportunities and merit-based pay.

Although the Women's International League for Peace and Freedom (WILPF) was predominantly an international organization of White women with only about one percent of its membership being women of color, McNeill joined the organization in 1934, at the invitation of Addie Waites Hunton. (Note: Although records of the WILPF did not typically identify members by race, women who have been identified as Black and pre-World War II members include McNeill, Marian Anderson, Charlotte Atwood, Thelma Carter, Helen Curtis, Addie Dickerson, Alice Dunbar-Nelson, Vera Chandler Foster, Addie Hunton, Flemmie Kittrell, Thelma Edwards Marshall, Vivian Carter Mason, Sadie Daniels St. Claire, Lucy Diggs Slowe, Mary Talbert, Mary Church Terrell, Mary Waring, and Mayme Williams. Black women who joined post-war were Shirley Chisholm, Virginia Collins, Angela Davis, Fannie Lou Hamer, Erna Prather Harris, Sadie Sawyer Hughley, Inez Jackson, Coretta Scott King, Eartha Kitt, Enola Maxwell, and Bessie McLaurin.) Since 1928, the WILPF had an Interracial Committee, which was tasked with increasing the numbers of elite women of color in the organization and eliminating the early policy of segregation that had caused the loss of early members such as Mary Church Terrell. The committee was headed by Hunton until she resigned in 1935 and was replaced by McNeill. McNeill pointed out early in her tenure that while Black women were allowed to serve at the national level, in state and local organizations, they were often limited to membership of the Interracial Committee, rather than WILPF itself. Although the national organization set policy, state and local organizations had broad autonomy. In 1937, McNeill, who had been elected to serve on the national WILPF Board, proposed that the non-national Interracial Committees be dissolved because they were used by some chapters to prevent racial integration and cooperation, and in some instances did not allow Black women to join WILPF. Her position was not accepted until 1941, when the Interracial Committees were disbanded and replaced with a national Committee on Minorities and Race Relations.

Despite the internal conflicts, McNeill was committed to recruiting new Black members, and in 1938 introduced Vera Chandler Foster, who organized a WILPF branch in Tuskegee, Alabama, and Lucy Diggs Slowe. She also pushed for WILPF's support of anti-lynching legislation and elimination of Jim Crow laws. She actively campaigned against conventions being held at hotels that did not allow Black delegates to stay in their facilities. McNeill served as a delegate from the United States to the Ninth International WILPF Congress held in Luhačovice, Czechoslovakia, in 1937. At the Congress, she brought up the case of the Scottsboro Boys, hoping to gain international support in linking peace initiatives with anti-lynching campaigns. The National chapter thereafter pressured the United States Congress to pass anti-lynching laws, but it did not do so. Like many other Black peace activists, McNeill believed in diplomatic intervention as a means of preventing aggression and fascism, rather than a neutral stance. WILPF members were divided on the issue, but African Americans felt strongly that the spread of World War II into East Africa necessitated both diplomatic and humanitarian efforts in order to stop the spread of authoritarianism and racially discriminatory policies implemented by the Italian regime. McNeill was elected to a second term on the executive board of the national WILPF in 1940.

As chair of the national Committee on Minorities and Race Relations, from 1941 McNeill worked to identify issues that impacted the freedom of any ethnic, racial, or religious minority in order to help the organization diversity its membership and promote its causes. When the Baldwin Bill was proposed in 1942, McNeil and other members of the national executive board counseled that it was unlikely opposing the bill would result in its rejection. The bill required women and aliens between the ages of eighteen and sixty-five to register for war assignments in either the civil or military service. Rather than oppose the bill, WILPF members lobbied for an amendment to the bill to exempt conscientious objectors from such service. A national Committee to Oppose the Conscription of Women, on which McNeill served, was formed in 1943. Ultimately, none of the six bills proposed during World War II, which required women to register with the Selective Service System, passed into law. When the war ended, McNeill turned over leadership of the Race Relations Committee and became chair of the Committee on the Special Problems of Branches. In 1946, she was a delegate to the International WILPF Congress held in Luxembourg, and was elected as second vice president of the U.S. WILPF Section. She was also a delegate to the 1949 International WILPF Congress in Copenhagen, Denmark, and at the 1953 Twelfth Congress in Paris.

McNeill was elected as a vice president of the national WILPF branch in 1948, 1949, 1950, 1953, and 1957. During that decade, her work on the Special Problems committee intensified. Several WILPF members and branches were accused during the era of McCarthyism of being communists. Red-baiting and investigations by the House Un-American Activities Committee against branches and individuals continued through the 1950s. Writer Christine Lutz noted that McNeill and other Black activists in the 1950s, risked being charged with subversion for linking "peace with economic justice". To limit damage to the national organization, McNeill implemented policies that limited local autonomy by preventing members suspected or being investigated from holding office. She also served on the National WILPF's Civil Rights Committee. After applying strong persuasion, the Black committee members, McNeill, Erna Prather Harris, and Bessie McLaurin, convinced the board to support the Supreme Court decision in the Brown v. Board of Education case and to assist with peaceful implementation of school desegregation. McNeill was elected president of the Washington, D.C., WILPF branch in 1954, and was re-elected several times, serving until 1960. In 1958, McNeill became the national organization's coordinator for its educational division. She was still giving lectures on peace to various women's groups at the end of the 1950s and remained active in WILPF throughout the 1960s and 1970s. Bertha McNeil also participated in the women's suffrage march of 1913.

== Death and legacy ==
McNeill died on September 21, 1979, at the Wisconsin Avenue Nursing Home, from arteriosclerosis. She is remembered as an influential member of the peace movement and a leader whose activism linked peace to freedom, as well as economic and civic justice. A chapter on her life is included in the Notable American Women: A Biographical Dictionary Completing the Twentieth Century. This was the fifth volume in the series and was edited by historian Susan Ware, assisted by Stacy Braukman. The women who were included had to have died prior to 2000, and be known for being influential or for contributing to pioneering or innovative work in their era. Some of McNeill's papers are housed in the Robert H. McNeill family collection at the Library of Congress, while some of those related to her WILPF activities are located in the Swarthmore College Peace Collection.
