= Bess Bolden Walcott =

American educator, librarian, and curator

- Born: Bessie Adeline Bolden; November 4, 1886; Xenia, Greene County, Ohio, U.S.
- Died: April 18, 1988 (aged 101); Tuskegee, Macon County, Alabama, U.S.
- Other name: Bess B. Walcott
- Occupations: educator, librarian, curator and activist
- Years active: 1908-1970
- Known for: establishing the Red Cross chapter at Tuskegee Institute

Bess Bolden Walcott (1886–1988) was an American educator, librarian, museum curator and activist who helped establish the historical significance of the Tuskegee University. Recruited by Booker T. Washington to help him coordinate his library and teach science, she remained at the institute until 1962, but continued her service into the 1970s. Throughout her fifty-four year career at Tuskegee, she organized Washington's library, taught science and English at the institute, served as founder and editor of two of the major campus publications, directed public relations, established the Red Cross chapter, curated the George Washington Carver collection and museum and assisted in Tuskegee being placed on the National Register of Historic Places.

In addition to her work at the school, Walcott was an active suffragist and member of the Women's International League for Peace and Freedom, serving in the early 1960s as the national vice president of the organization. Walcott was recognized for her contributions to the state of Alabama in 2003, when she was inducted into the Alabama Women's Hall of Fame.

== Early life ==
Bessie Adeline Bolden was born on November 4, 1886, in Xenia, Ohio, to Fannie A. (née Bizzell) and William P. Bolden. Around 1900, the family moved to Painesville in Lake County. In June, 1908, Bolden graduated from Oberlin College and secured employment at Tuskegee Institute.

== Career ==
Bolden began her career as a science teacher at Tuskegee and helped Booker T. Washington organize his library. In 1911, she married William Holbrook Walcott, who was also a professor at the institute. In 1918, she began teaching English at the high school of the institute. That same year, she pushed for the charter for a Red Cross chapter at Tuskegee. It would be the first black chapter granted in the United States. While Walcott was not the chairman, as executive director she was the driving force behind the organization. The initial chairman was Robert Russa Moton and the vice presidency was shared by Moton's wife Jennie and Booker T. Washington's wife, Margaret. Jennie, Margaret and Walcott also were members of the Tuskegee Woman's Club. The club was active in the suffrage movement and when women earned the right to vote, Walcott and three friends immediately went to register to vote.

Walcott's Red Cross work kept her extremely busy, assisting in the war effort as well as the 1918 flu pandemic. In 1931, Walcott transferred to the principal's office, where she directed the school's press service and worked with newspaper publicity. She also founded and edited two of the largest campus publications, the Tuskegee Messenger and Service. During the Great Depression, Walcott led the Red Cross chapter's effort to distribute food and goods to poverty-stricken black farm families with grant funds secured from the national chapter. In 1936, she chaired the 40th anniversary celebration committee in honor of George Washington Carver's work at Tuskegee.

In 1941, during World War II, Walcott became the first African American to serve as an Acting Field Director for the Red Cross. Between 1942 and 1946, she served as the Public Relations Director of Tuskegee and much of her work focused on chronicling the development and reputation of the Tuskegee Airmen. To promote the war effort, Walcott traveled extensively and sold war bonds. In 1946, she was reappointed as the Acting Field Director, serving until 1947. Her duties in the post required that she oversee aid to returning veterans and assist with training of Red Cross volunteers. During the same period, she joined the Women's International League for Peace and Freedom (WILPF), along with other noted African American women leaders like, Sadie Sawyer Hughley, Shirley Chisholm, Coretta Scott King, and many others.

In 1947, Walcott and her husband divorced, after having had four children. She served as the curator of The George Washington Carver Museum between 1951 and 1962, when she retired from Tuskegee. In 1962, Walcott was elected as the national vice president of WILPF and went as the American delegate to the 15th Triennial Congress held in San Francisco. She also participated in lectures for WILPF, speaking at events on Civil Rights, such as the conference held in Estes Park, Colorado, in 1963, where she presented a lecture Next Steps Toward Integration, North and South.

Between 1964 and 1965, Walcott traveled to Liberia, acting as a consultant for the proposed Tubman Centre of African Culture. William Tubman, President of Liberia and namesake of the center, honored her as a knight of the Humane Order of African Redemption. At Tuskegee, she meticulously gathered and conserved artistic and historic materials created by Carver, including his correspondence. Her preservation efforts documented the pivotal role Tuskegee played in both the state and national history, preparing the path for the Tuskegee Institute's designation as a National Historic Landmark in 1965. Walcott's work as a curator of the museum led to its becoming a National Park Service site and in the 1970s, she assisted the Park Service in the restoration of Booker T. Washington's home, The Oaks.

== Death and legacy ==
Walcott died on April 18, 1988, in Tuskegee, Macon County, Alabama. In 2003, she was inducted into the Alabama Women's Hall of Fame for her contributions in the state and her profession.In 2022, the Alabama Department of Archives and History held a program honoring Mollie Dowd, Eva Sterrs, and Bess Bolden Walcott as three "pathbreaking" Alabama women activists.
