= Suzuko =

- Gender: Female

Origin
- Origin: Japanese
- Meaning: Different meanings depending on the kanji used

Suzuko (written: 鈴子 or すずこ in hiragana) is a feminine Japanese given name. Notable people with the name include:

- Suzuko Matsumura (松村 鈴子; born 1958), Japanese swimmer
- Suzuko Mimori (三森 すずこ; born 1986), Japanese voice actress
- Suzuko Numata (1923 - 2011), Japanese peace activist
- Suzuko Seki (関 鈴子; born 1936), Japanese gymnast

== Fictional characters ==
- Suzuko Kanzaki (神埼 鈴子), character in the anime series AKB0048
- Suzuko Kawahara (川原 鈴子), character in the manga series Spriggan

== See also ==
- 8712 Suzuko, main-belt asteroid
