= Emile Shoufani =

Israeli Arab Christian theologist (1947–2024)

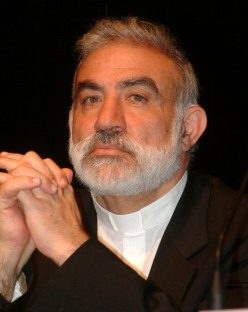
Image of Emile Shoufani

Emile Shoufani (Arabic: أميل شوفاني, Hebrew: אמיל שופאני; 24 May 1947 – 18 February 2024) was an Israeli Arab Christian theologist, educator, and peace activist. An archimandrite of the Melkite Greek Catholic Church. Fr. Shoufani won a UNESCO Prize for Peace Education (2003).

== Biography ==
Emile Shoufani was the second of eight children raised by a Melkite father and an Orthodox mother. A few months after Israel's establishment in 1948, he was deported with his family. His grandfather and uncle were killed by the Israeli army during the 1948 Palestine war. Raised by his grandmother, the latter taught him the value of forgiveness and the rejection of hatred. He became a choirboy at the church Eilaboun, which was built after 1949. He was soon fascinated by the liturgy and entered the seminary at the age of 13. Sent to France by his superiors at age 17, he studied philosophy and theology at the Seminary of Morsang-sur-Orge, then the seminary of St. Sulpice at Issy-les-Moulineaux in 1966. Shoufani died on 18 February 2024, at the age of 76.

== Priesthood ==
As a priest in Nazareth, he taught at St. Joseph Seminary & High School at Nazareth where he became manager in 1976. In the college where half the students are Muslims and one Christian, Fr. Shoufani worked every day to encourage the teaching of democratic values and dialogue. For over twenty years, encounters with Jewish schools have been held three times a year.

== Jewish-Arab reconciliation ==
Living in the heart of Israeli-Palestinian clashes, he perceived that the best way to take a step towards reconciliation and dialogue was to teach the Holocaust. In late 2002, he organized the first Jewish-Arab travel to Auschwitz-Birkenau in May 2003. Jean Mouttapa, Director of Spirituality of Editions Albin Michel and a strong player in interreligious dialogue, brought valuable assistance in organizing the French part of the pilgrimage and created the association "Memory for Peace". This initiative supported by many intellectuals in Israel has attracted over 500 people and earned him the Unesco Prize for Peace Education in the same year.

"Whoever is in front of me is someone who has a quality experience and not an identity card to brandish."

== "Memory for Peace" ==
"I appeal to my Arab brothers to join me together make a strong gesture, audacious and absolutely free. At the place that incarnates the atrocity of genocide, Auschwitz-Birkenau, we will proclaim our brotherhood with the millions of victims ... This act of remembrance will indicate our deep rejection of such inhuman It demonstrates our ability to understand the wounds of others. "

"I appeal to my Jewish brethren to realize that the vast majority of Arab and Muslim world, the conflict tearing us apart is not religious, racial or even less. The Arab are not the successors of those who once wanted to wipe out the Jews as Jews. Like them heirs of the faith of Abraham, they are like them carrying light values. "

"This trip to the darkest depths of the memory of mankind can in no way relativize the suffering of other people in other places and at other times. It will on the contrary bring us face our responsibilities now, and our vocation as human beings turned into aliving together.

== See also ==
Melkite Greek Catholic Archeparchy of Akka
