= Mollie Dowd =

American suffragist (1883-1953)

- Dowd, from a 1921 publication
- Born: 1883; Nashville, Tennessee, U.S.
- Died: December 22, 1953 (aged 69–70); Birmingham, Alabama, U.S.
- Occupations: Labor official, union organizer, suffragist

Mollie Dowd (1883 – December 22, 1953) was an American suffragist and labor organizer from Alabama, "one of the best known and most intellectual women in the South."

== Early life and education ==
Dowd was born in Nashville, Tennessee, the daughter of Frank Dowd and Mary Alice Scanlan Dowd. She was raised in Tennessee and Ohio but moved to Alabama as a young woman.

== Career ==
Dowd worked in a Birmingham department store as a young woman, and joined a trade union. During World War I, she was a department store manager in Birmingham and sold war bonds. She was active in the women's suffrage movement. After suffrage was won, she was secretary of the Alabama League of Women Voters. With several other women, she started workers' committees in several Alabama cities in 1921, and delivered food to the families of striking miners. She helped to found the Alabama Women's Trade Union League and was active with the national organization. In 1934 she and other union organizers worked with striking textile mill workers in Huntsville.

In 1935 she was appointed to head the Alabama Department of Labor's Conciliation Division. She advocated for pro-labor legislation, including clinics, hospitals, and health insurance for working people.

Dowd stayed several days at the White House in 1936, with other members of the WTUL. Eleanor Roosevelt mentioned a visit with "old friends" Dowd and Louise O. Charlton in a 1939 "My Day" column. Also in 1939, she testified before a Senate committee hearing in favor of a national health program.

== Publications ==
- "Making a Beginning in the Far South" (1921)
- "Activities of the Woman Voter" (1928, 1931)

== Personal life ==
Dowd died in 1953, at the age of 70. In 2022, the Alabama Department of Archives and History held a program honoring Dowd, Eva Sterrs, and Bess Bolden Walcott as three "pathbreaking" Alabama women activists.
