= Women's Union for the League of Nations =

French women's organization

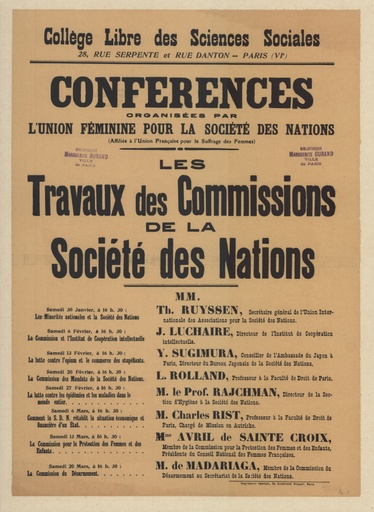
Poster of conferences organized by the Women's Union for the League of Nations

The Women's Union for the League of Nations (French: Union Féminine pour la Société des Nations) was a French women's organization which was founded in 1920 by the French Union for Women's Suffrage as a basis for ensuring representation of women's interests at the League of Nations. Key figures were Marie-Louise Puech, Marguerite de Witt-Schlumberger and Germaine Malaterre-Sellier.

Established as a section of the French Union for Women's Suffrage following the Congress of the International Women Suffrage Alliance, held in Geneva from 6 to 12 June 1920, it soon became completely independent. Its approach was based on international law as embodied by the International Court of Justice. Unlike other groups behind the League of Nations, it did not call for peace at any price but instead relied on legislation as a means of achieving international peace. The organization sought to bring together "women of all political, philosophical or religious convictions" in order to put an end to every possibility of warfare by "fighting energetically for moral disarmament, a precondition for material disarmament".

By some estimates, the membership had grown to as many as 1,500 by 1929 although that figure might well include members of the French Union for Women's Suffrage and the Association d’anciennes élèves des Écoles Normales.

Among the other dedicated feminists who played an important part in the organization were Cécile Brunschvicg, who was president in the 1920s, and Anna Jézéquel, secretary of Alliance universelle pour l’amitié par les Églises (Universal Alliance for Friendship through Churches).

== See also ==
- Inter-Allied Women's Conference
