= Marie-Louise Puech-Milhau =

French pacifist and journal editor

Marie-Louise Puech-Milhau (1876–1966) was a French pacifist, feminist and journal editor. In 1900, she went to Canada where she became a lecturer at McGill University until 1908 when she returned to France. In 1911, she subscribed to the newspaper La Française, the source of her appetite for feminism. After the end of the First World War, she became Secretary of the Union pour le Suffrage des Femmes and President of the Union Féminine pour la Société des Nations. She is also remembered for the extensive correspondence she maintained with family members, former students and war veterans.
