= Robert Muller (United Nations) =

Civil servant with the United Nations

- Born: 11 March 1923; Weismes, Belgium
- Died: 20 September 2010 (aged 87)

Robert Muller (11 March 1923 – 20 September 2010) was an international civil servant with the United Nations. Serving with the UN for 40 years and rising to the rank of assistant secretary-general, his ideas about world government, world peace and spirituality led to the increased representation of religions in the UN, especially of the New Age movement. He was known by some as "the philosopher of the United Nations".

== Early life and education ==
Born in Belgium, Muller grew up in the Alsace–Lorraine region in France on the border of Germany as a French citizen. The border issues he saw as a child had a significant impact on his life and his decision to work at the United Nations. During his youth, Muller experienced constant political and cultural turmoil. He knew the horrors of World War II, of being a refugee, of the Nazi occupation in France, imprisonment and escape from prison. During the war he was a member of the French Resistance where towards the end of the war he unsuccessfully tried to prevent the slaughter of a group of captured German soldiers. This was a major life event that led to work for peace. After the war, he returned home and earned a Doctorate of Law from the University of Strasbourg. In 1948, he entered and won an essay contest on how to govern the world, the prize of which was an internship at the newly created United Nations.

== Career ==
Muller began working at the United Nations just as it was forming. He devoted the next 40 years of his life behind the scenes at the United Nations, focusing his energies on nurturing a better world, including working for the environment, economics and peace. He was instrumental in the conception of many multilateral bodies, including the UN Development Programme, World Food Programme, UN Population Fund, and World Youth Assembly. He rose through the ranks at the UN to the official position of assistant secretary-general and served under three secretaries-general.

Muller created a "World Core Curriculum" that earned him the UNESCO Prize for Peace Education in 1989. The "World Core Curriculum" helped inspire the growing Global Education movement. More than 30 Robert Muller schools were founded throughout the world, including LIFE School in Panajachel, Guatemala, from which students have gone on to pursue degrees in international affairs.

He was the recipient of multiple awards and honors, including the Albert Schweitzer International Prize for the Humanities and the Eleanor Roosevelt Man of Vision Award.

In addition to his duties at the University for Peace, he devoted time to his writings and was an internationally acclaimed, multilingual speaker and author of fourteen books published in various languages. One of his major writings came from writing one idea-dream each day for nurturing a better world. His goal was to have written 2000 ideas and dreams by the beginning of the new millennium. He achieved this and went on to write over 7000 ideas and dreams. In his speeches he spoke of these idea-dreams and over the years noted that many of these ideas were being worked on and some had been completed.

At the prompting of many of his friends, admirers and non-governmental organizations, Muller was a candidate as a global citizen in 1996 for the post of Secretary-General of the United Nations. He was also nominated multiple times for the Nobel Peace Prize.

Muller died on 20 September 2010.

== Honors and awards ==
- UNESCO Prize for Peace Education in 1989
- Albert Schweitzer International Prize for the Humanities in 1993
- Eleanor Roosevelt Man of Vision Award in 1994
- Member of the Advisory Council of the Nuclear Age Peace Foundation, and received the foundation's World Citizenship Award in 2002.
- Goi Peace Award in 2003
- Honored by the New York Open Center in 2005 for his "Lifetime Dedication to World Peace and Global Education".

== Bibliography ==
- A Planet of Hope, First edition: Amity House. ISBN 0916349047 ISBN 978-0916349042
- Decide To, First Edition: Acron Publishing, U.K. (1998) Second Edition: World Happiness and Cooperation, USA, also published in Portuguese. ISBN 0948932090 ISBN 9780948932090
- Dialogues of Hope, World Happiness and Cooperation (1990), USA, also published in German. ASIN B0015UBVWA
- Essays on Education, A Vision for Educators, edited by Joanne Dufour World Happiness and Cooperation, USA.
- First Lady of the World, World Happiness and Cooperation, USA (1991). ISBN 1880455013 ISBN 9781880455012
- Most of All, They Taught Me Happiness, First Edition: Doubleday (1978), Second Edition: World Happiness and Cooperation (1990) Third Edition: Amare Media (2005), also published in German. ISBN 0385199147 ISBN 9780385199148
- My Testament to the UN, World Happiness and Cooperation, USA (1992), also published in German. ISBN 1880455072 ISBN 9781880455074
- New Genesis, Shaping a Global Spirituality, First Edition: Doubleday, Second Edition: World Happiness and Cooperation, USA, also published in French, Italian, Polish and Japanese. ISBN 0385193327 ISBN 9780385193320
- The Desire to be human : a global reconnaissance of human perspectives in an age of transformation written in honour of Pierre Teilhard de Chardin : International Teilhard Compendium : Centenary volume by Pierre Teilhard de Chardin, Leo Zonneveld, Robert Muller. ISBN 9062716849 ISBN 9789062716845
- What War Taught Me About Peace, First Edition: Doubleday. ISBN 0385231873 ISBN 9780385231879
- Safe Passage into the 21st Century, co-authored with Ambassador Douglas Roche, Continuum Press, New York (1995). ISBN 0826408664 ISBN 9780826408662
- The Birth of a Global Civilization, World Happiness and Cooperation, USA (1991), also published in German and Spanish. ISBN 1880455005 ISBN 9781880455005
- 3000 Ideas and Dreams for a Better World, Media 21, Santa Barbara, California. ISBN 1881474356 ISBN 9781881474357
- Sima, MON AMOUR. ISBN 270850018X ISBN 9782708500181
