= Jeanne Oddo-Deflou =

French feminist

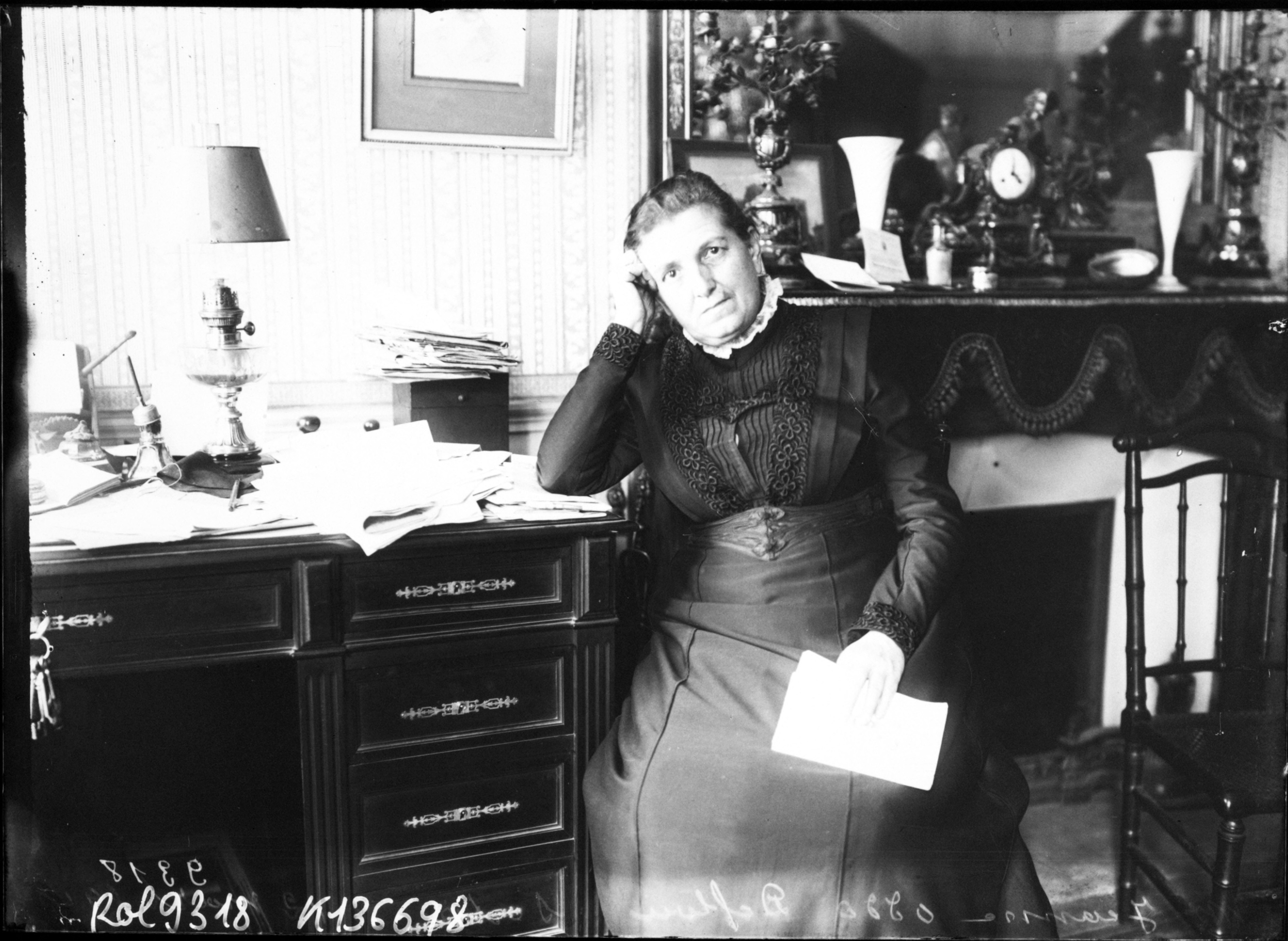
Jeanne Oddo-Deflou (1910)

Jeanne Oddo-Deflou (1846–1915) was a French translator, educator and feminist. In 1898, she founded the Groupe français d'Etudes féministes, believing that while women's suffrage was the ultimate goal, it was important first to reform the underlying laws. From 1899, she was a member of the Ligue française pour le droit des femmes and from 1901 of Suffrage des femmes in support of votes for women. A delegate at various meetings of the International Congress of Women (London, Paris, Brussels, Berlin), she served as secretary for the Congrès des droits civils et du suffrage des femmes. In 1906, she published Le Sexualisme which called for women to have the right to develop in a spirit of "liberty, dignity and fullness". She was a regular contributor to La Française.
