= UNESCO Prize for Peace Education =

The UNESCO Prize for Peace Education was awarded annually beginning 1981. The main goal of UNESCO education prize was to encourage excellent effort in the drive to reach a better quality education. The prize endowed up to US$60,000 and a statuette designed by spanish sculptor Apel·les Fenosa for UNESCO. It honored extraordinary activities for peace education in the spirit of the UNESCO constitution. The prize was phased out in 2013.

== Recipients ==
- 1981: Helena Kekkonen (Finland) / World Organization of the Scout Movement
- 1982: Stockholm International Peace Research Institute (SIPRI)
- 1983: Pax Christi International
- 1984: IPPNW International Physicians for the Prevention of Nuclear War
- 1985: Indar Jit Rikhye (India) / Georg-Eckert-Institut für Internationale Schulbuchforschung (Germany)
- 1986: Paulo Freire (Brazil)
- 1987: Laurence Deonna (Switzerland) / "Servicio Paz y Justicia en America Latina"
- 1988: Frère Roger, Taizé (France)
- 1989: Robert Muller (France) / International Peace Research Association (IPRA)
- 1990: Rigoberta Menchú Tum (Guatemala) / World Order Models Project (WOMP)
- 1991: Ruth Leger Sivard (United States) / Cours Sainte Marie de Hann (Senegal)
- 1992: Mother Teresa
- 1993: Madeleine de Vits (Belgium) and Graduate Institute of Peace Studies at Kyung Hee University (South Korea)
- 1994: Prayudh Payutto (Thailand)
- 1995: Study Center for Peace and Conflict Resolution (Austria)
- 1996: Chiara Lubich (Italy)
- 1997: Francois Giraud (France)
- 1998: Educators for Peace and Mutual Understanding (Ukraine)

Honourable mention: Fridtjof Nansen Academy (Norway), World Court Project (New Zealand), Ulpan Akiva Netanya (Israel)

- 1999: Asociación Madres de Plaza de Mayo, Buenos Aires, Argentina

Honourable mention: Verein für Friedenspädagogik, Tübingen (Germany)

- 2000: Australian Peace Educator Toh Swee-Hin
- 2001: Jewish-Arab Centre for Peace Education in Givat Haviva (Israel) and Bishop Nelson Onono Onweng, Uganda
- 2002: City Montessori School, Lucknow, (India)
- 2003: Emile Shoufani, Greek-Catholic Archimandrite in Nazareth
- 2006: Christopher Gregory Weeramantry (Sri Lanka)

Honourable mention: Fundación para la Reconciliación (Colombia)

- 2008: Institute for Justice and Reconciliation (South Africa)

== See also ==
- List of peace activists
