= Pauline Rebour =

French academic (1876–1956)

- Pauline Rebour (La Française, 1937)
- Born: Pauline Rebour; December 1878; Mortain, France
- Died: 1956 (aged 77–78)
- Occupations: Academic, lawyer
- Known for: French women's suffrage movement

Pauline Rebour (1878–1956) was a French academic noted for her works as a feminist and suffragist. She was the founder of Feminist Society of Le Havre and was a member of the French Union for Women's Suffrage (1914), and the Secular and Democratic Action of Women (1935).

== Biography ==
Rebour was born December 1878 in Mortain, France to Théophile Boyenval, a school teacher and college administrator, and Alice Harel. Her family was affluent, allowing her to obtain higher education. This environment is said to be a characteristic of female teachers of public education in France during Rebour's time.

Rebour obtained a degree in law and was identified as a lawyer during her tenure at the French Union for Women's Suffrage as part of its central committee. Her contemporaries include Jeanne Chauvin, Olga Petit, Suzanne Grinberg, and Marcelle Kraemer-Bach.

== Activism ==
Rebour's activism during her tenure at the Feminist Society of Le Havre was credited for forcing Le Havre to provide female teachers the same allowance received by their male colleagues. As part of her co-education campaigns, she also promoted teaching young girls along with boys at home. Her works for the Federation Feministe Universitaire also contributed in achieving equal treatment for female teachers in France.

Rebour was also active in promoting women's interest in politics. In late 1912, she was one of the voices who attacked the exclusion of women in the selection of a French ministry's 250 members. In response to the claim that women did not need political rights since they exert influence at home, she wrote in La Francaise that the exclusion from the commission with emphasis on motherhood and children exposed the argument's flaw. She also headed the suffrage section of the CNFF with the support of her husband, Raoul, who was a high ranking civil servant.

Rebour, however, had proposed radical feminist ideas that were different compared to those advanced by her peers. She had cautioned against excessively feminizing education, arguing that it did not advance women's access to the vote or public roles reserved for men.
