= Velma Šarić =

Bosnian journalist and human rights worker

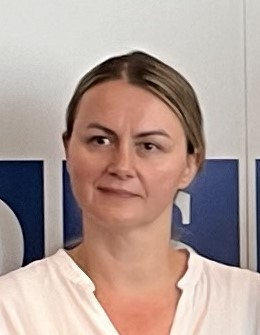
- Velma Šarić, photographed in Vitez, Bosnia and Herzegovina in 2020.
- Born: 8 April 1979 (age 47); Vlasenica, Bosnia and Herzegovina
- Education: University of Sarajevo
- Known for: Founder and president of the Post-Conflict Research Center
- Website: https://www.p-crc.org

Velma Šarić (born 8 April 1979) is a Bosnian journalist and the founder and president of the Post-Conflict Research Center – a peace building organization, based in Sarajevo, which works to cultivate an environment for sustainable peace in Bosnia-Herzegovina and the greater Balkans region. As a trained researcher, journalist, and human rights defender, she has dedicated her career to investigative reporting and peace building in the Balkans. Šarić works on behalf of marginalized groups in Bosnia-Herzegovina, promoting and encouraging respect for the rights of victims, women, and ethnic minorities.

== Early life ==
Šarić was 12 years old at the start of the Bosnian war in 1992. She spent the next 3 years under siege. Šarić is a trained journalist, having studied at the BBC Reporting School and the University of Sarajevo's Faculty of Political Science.

== Journalism career ==
Šarić has worked as a court reporter for the Balkan Investigative Reporting Network (BIRN), the Association of Court Reporters in Bosnia and Herzegovina, and the Institute for War and Peace Reporting (IWPR). While with the IWPR from 2008 to 2014, she wrote more than 300 reports from proceedings of the International Criminal Tribunal for the former Yugoslavia, including the trials of Radovan Karadžić and Ratko Mladić. As a freelance journalist, she has collaborated with many international media outlets, including Al Jazeera, PBS, National Geographic, Süddeutsche Zeitung, The New York Times, La Repubblica, Le Monde, The Guardian, and Deutsche Welle. In 2014, Šarić became the Ground Truth Fellow for the Global Post where she conducted research and reported on problems of youth unemployment in Bosnia-Herzegovina. To advance peace and reconciliation processes in the Western Balkans, Šarić has collaborated with local and foreign experts, artists, directors, journalists, and professors around the world.

=== Media works ===
Šarić has produced several photography exhibitions and peace building-focused documentaries, including Uspomene 677 and Ordinary Heroes. She was also the Bosnian Producer for "War Redefined" and "I Came to Testify", both episodes of PBS' "Women, War and Peace" series. In 2011, Šarić acted as a researcher and consultant for UN Goodwill Ambassador Angelina Jolie's film In the Land of Blood and Honey. Most recently, Velma and PCRC co-produced the latest PINCH Media documentary - Where have you been?.

As a researcher and curator, Velma helped produced seven photography exhibitions including Transitions , Warriors of Peace with photographer Elizabeth Herman, Hasija's story with photographer Velija Hasanbegović, "My Body: A War Zone", "Rescuers", "A Living Man Declared Dead and Other Chapters I-XVIII" with photographer Taryn Simon and "Quest for Identify" with photographer Ziyah Gafić.

== Conflict Mitigation and Peace Building ==
Šarić is a participant in the Alliance for Historical Dialogue and Accountability (AHDA) fellowship at Columbia University in New York City, which brings together scholars, civil society organizations, journalists, and artists to discuss issues associated with historical dialogue. Šarić is the only Bosnian to be a part of the VV100 – a Vital Voices group of 100 most engaged and visionary members of the Vital Voices Global Leadership Network.

Šarić worked as a Project Manager for the WARM Foundation, an international organization that reports on the untold artistic, human condition, and memorial stories of the world's contemporary conflicts.

Since August 2024, Šarić is the Leonard and Sophie Davis Genocide Prevention Fellow in the Simon-Skjodt Center for the Prevention of Genocide at the United States Holocaust Memorial Museum.

=== The Post-Conflict Research Center ===
The Post-Conflict Research Center (PCRC) was established in 2010 by Velma Šarić and Co-founder and Vice President Leslie Woodward. Since 2011, Šarić and the PCRC have also led the United Nations Office of the Special Adviser on the Prevention of Genocide's regional initiative to strengthen early-warning capacities across the region.

As part of her work at the Post-Conflict Research Center, Šarić also founded Balkan Diskurs, an online platform for young activists and journalists that challenges stereotypes and shares diverse, independent views on society, culture, and politics in the Western Balkans with a readership of over 100,000 people. In 2017, Balkan Diskurs was awarded the Intercultural Achievement Recognition Award by the Austrian Federal Ministry for Europe, Integration and Foreign Affairs.

== Awards and Recognitions ==
In 2014, The United Nations Alliance of Civilizations (UNAOC) and the BMW Group selected PCRC's project, Ordinary Heroes, from more than 600 applicants to receive the Intercultural Innovation Award given personally by the UN Secretary-General Ban Ki Moon. This award recognizes innovative approaches to promoting intercultural dialogue, understanding, and co-operation. In February 2015, PCRC was named by the Council of Europe as a top- five finalist for The Diversity Advantage Challenge Award, which recognizes organizations that raise awareness among public and private decision-makers about the benefits of diversity. PCRC's Ordinary Heroes is featured as a "best practice" in a toolkit developed by the Congress of Local and Regional Authorities of the Council of Europe, to educate elected officials on methods for organizing intercultural and inter-religious activities in 46 Council of Europe states.

After PCRC's Ordinary Heroes project discovered Bosnian rescuer Mina Jahić, former US Secretary of State Hillary Clinton formally recognized Mina for saving the life of fellow Bosnian Ferid Spahić during the 60th anniversary of the 1951 Convention Related to the Status of Refugees.

PCRC and Velma Šarić have been chosen as 2018 Peace Ambassadors by the Centre for Peace Studies Sri Lanka. Šarić is the first and only person from Bosnia and Western Balkans to be selected for this position. In 2022, PCRC and Velma were awarded the first “Local Peacebuilder” award on January 27, 2022 in Washington, D.C. by the Alliance for Peacebuilding (AfP).

== Publications ==
=== Peer-reviewed ===
- Velma Šarić, Louis Monroy Santander. What lessons can be learned from the Western Balkans in relation to reconciliation and when looking at rebuilding relationships? International Nuremberg Principles Academy. 2018. P. 45
- Peter W. Van Arsdale, Leslie P. Woodward, Velma Šarić, "The Little Apple: Ethnic Conflict, Educational Challenges, and Socioeconomic Struggles in a Bosnian Town - A Longitudinal Study," The Applied Anthropologist. 2015. Vol. 35, No. 2, 27-34.

=== Journalistic/Outreach ===
- Velma Šarić, Tanya Domi, Episode 6: Interview of Velma Saric: How Does a Country Build Peace in the Aftermath of Genocide? Alliance for Peacebuilding. https://www.allianceforpeacebuilding.org/peace-we-build-it-podcast/episodes
- Tatjana Milovanović, Marija Arnautović, Velma Šarić, Real Voice of Journalism: Report on the state of media freedom in 17 local BiH communities. Post-Conflict Research Center. June 2018.
- Velma Šarić, Rachel Irwin, Special Report: Hague Tribunal: Truth, Justice – and Reconciliation Too? Institute for War and Peace Reporting. TRI Issue 837. 6 June 2014.
- Velma Šarić, Elizabeth D. Herman, Why Bosnia has the world's highest youth unemployment rate Global Post. 9 October 2014.
- Velma Šarić (8 April 2013). "Roses are red, but I am blue". Future Challenges. Archived from the original on 18 April 2021.
- Velma Šarić, Rachel Irwin, Special Report: Poor Protection for Balkan Trial Witnesses Institute for War and Peace Reporting. TRI Issue 766. 22 November 2012.
- Velma Šarić, Rachel Irwin, Special Report: Calls for War Memorials Divide Bosnia Institute for War and Peace Reporting. TRI Issue 673. 6 December 2010.
- Velma Šarić, Bosnian War Crimes Justice Plan Questioned Institute for War and Peace Reporting. 27 February 2009.

== External Resources ==
- Interview on Balkan Diskurs
- Hasija's Story
- Transitions – Stories from BiH, Colombia, Democratic Republic of the Congo, and the USA
- My Body: A War Zone
