= Suzanne Grinberg =

French lawyer, feminist and pacifist (1888–1972)

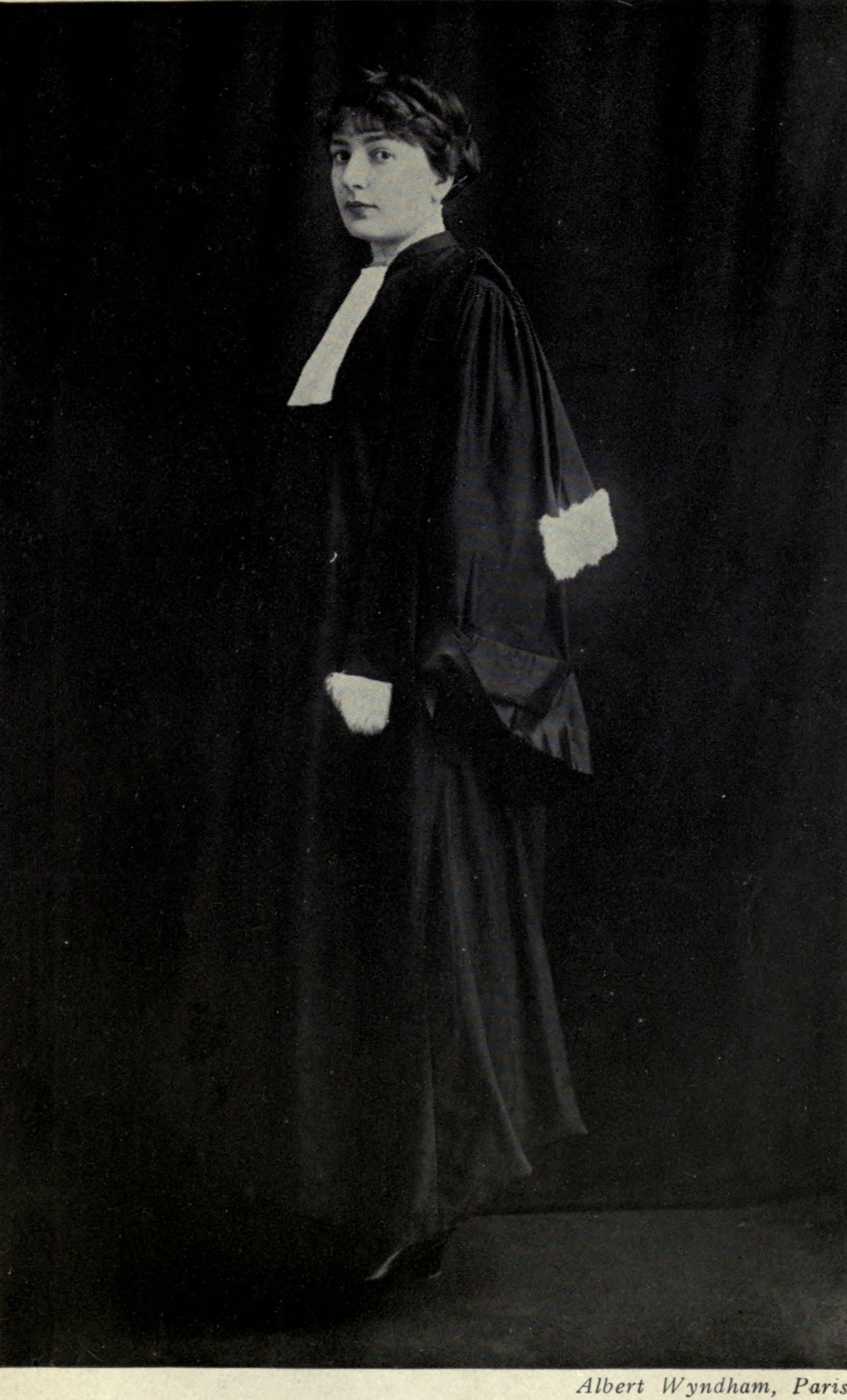
Suzanne Grinberg

Suzanne Grinberg ( 25 January 1888 –5 July 1972) was a pioneering French lawyer, feminist and pacifist. She was one of the women who participated in the Inter-Allied Women's Conference which opened in Paris in February 1919. In 1920, she was vice-president of the Association du Jeune Barreau and secretary of the central committee of the French Union for Women's Suffrage. Her contemporaries in the committee include Pauline Rebour and Marcelle Kraemer-Bach. In one of her arguments for women's suffrage, she argued that, in France, women were forced to choose between love for their homelands and their love for their husbands. She later published an account of the French suffragist movement (1926) as well as two works on women's rights (1935 and 1936).

Grinberg's works included her campaign for a favorable legal status of women in Algeria and that their claim to women's rights depended on the legal recognition of their liberal equality.
