= Germaine Malaterre-Sellier =

French feminist, suffragist and pacifist

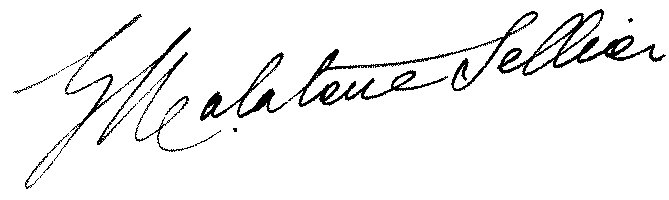

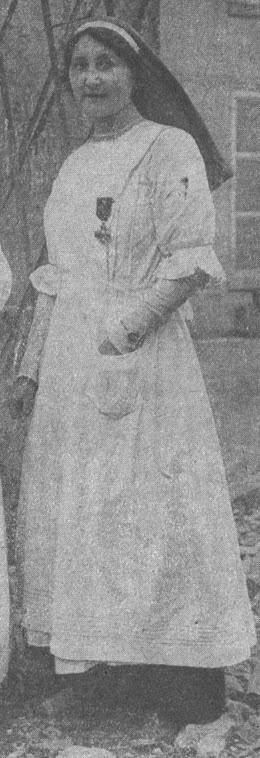
Germaine Malaterre-Sellier in the periodical La Vie française in June 1919.

Germaine Renée Suzanne Malaterre-Sellier (1889–1967) was a French nurse, feminist, suffragist and pacifist. From 1920, she was Vice-President of the Union féminine pour la Société des Nations (Women's Union for the League of Nations). In parallel, she was first Secretary-General, then Vice-President of the Union Française pour le Suffrage des Femmes (French Women's Suffrage Union).

During the First World War, she was the principal nurse of the Association des Dames de France under the Red Cross. She is remembered for her heroic service, frequently being associated with the war veterans. After her activities as a pacifist, she participated in discussions of the parliamentary committee on social affairs, especially those relating to children. It was Germaine Malaterre-Sellier who drafted the committee's report.

She continued to serve public institutions in the 1930, becoming the first French women to be appointed a technical adviser to the League of Nations in 1932. In 1937, she conducted a survey in the United States and Canada on behalf of the League of Nations.

During the Second World War, she supported the French Resistance.

Germaine Malaterre-Sellier died in Paris on 29 May 1967.
