= Committee to Oppose the Conscription of Women =

The Committee to Oppose the Conscription of Women (COCW), later renamed the Women’s Committee to Oppose Conscription (WCOC), was founded in 1943 in the United States by Mildred S. Olmsted. The committee was created to combat legislation that would draft nurses into the American armed forces. The organization was also active in combating the Austin-Wadsworth Bill, or the National Service Act, which would make it compulsory for men and women to work in war industry jobs as needed during World War II.

== History ==
The Austin-Wadsworth Bill, which was drafted by Representative James W. Wadsworth Jr. and Senator Warren Austin in 1943, proposed the conscription of both men and women for jobs in the private sector and war industry. The bill included women between the ages of 18 and 50 without dependent children and men between the ages of 18 and 65. These men and women would become available for the draft and could be assigned to military industries anywhere in the country. Exemptions were given to pregnant women and those that cared for elderly relatives.

Although many Americans actually supported female conscription, a fierce debate ensued over the pending legislation. The Committee to Oppose the Conscription of Women was promptly formed by Olmstead and included many current or former members of Women’s International League for Peace and Freedom (WILPF) and other women’s rights organizations. The Committee's leaders were feminists, promoting equal rights for women; other members were pacifists, and opposed conscription legislation on the basis of anti-war beliefs.

At first the COCW argued from a feminist point of view, defending women’s right to choose if and how they wanted to work. They pointed out that military and civilian conscription would place women under male domination, reversing freedoms for which they had fought long and hard. However, in order to gain wider support the members began to oppose the legislation on more traditional grounds.

The Committee opposed the drafting of all nurses into the armed forces, asserting that it was unnecessary, because the many nurses who had already volunteered to join the armed services and other wartime industries, and in particular Black nurses, were not fully utilized. Also, many people feared that children would suffer from a lack of maternal affection if women were forced to move away for work, and the Committee promoted this point of view.

Leaflets and pamphlets were mailed members of the Fellowship of Reconciliation, the Women’s International League, and to religious groups, including Methodist, Mennonite, Quaker, and Brethren church groups. The COCW gained an unusually diverse base of support among these groups. In the end, the Austin-Wadsworth Bill was defeated. Fewer than 35 percent of available women entered war-time factories and munitions plants; 90 percent of women with children under the age of 18 stayed home.

After the defeat of the bill, the Committee began to oppose the peacetime conscription of males, and subsequently lost the approval of many of the conservative groups which had supported it.

The Committee’s records and documents are stored in the Peace Collection at the Swarthmore College library.
