= Malebogo Molefhe =

Botswana basketball player and activist

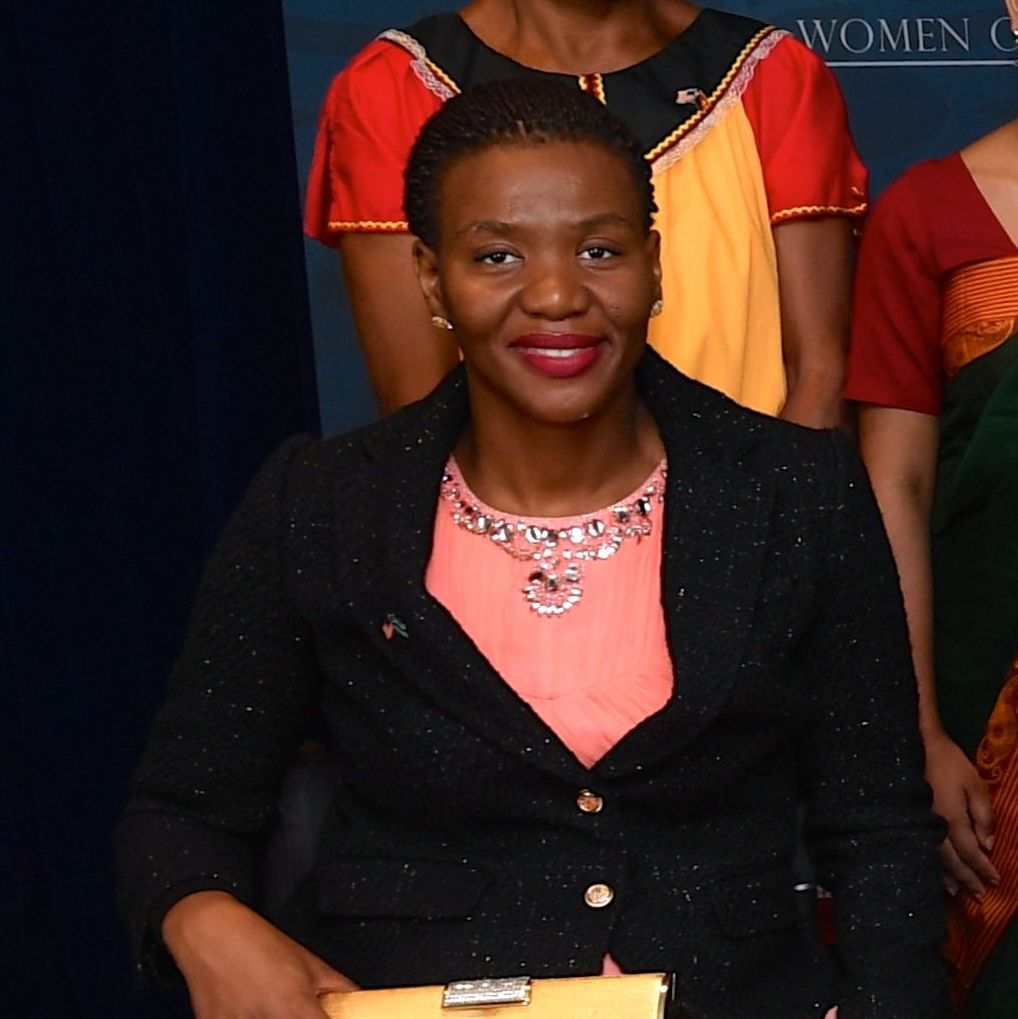
- Malebogo Molefhein at the 2017 International Women of Courage award ceremony
- Born: c. 1980

Malebogo Molefhe (born c. 1980) is a Motswana basketball player who became an activist against gender based violence after being shot eight times. In 2017, she received an International Women of Courage Award.

== Life ==
Molefhe was born in 1980. She was chosen to represent her country at basketball, playing the sport professionally since the age of 18. She lives in Manyana.

Malebogo grew up in the southern African nation of Botswana and lives south of Gaborone. Her former boyfriend attacked her in 2009, when she was 29. In the attack, her boyfriend shot her eight times. The attacker, who was described as "deranged", then shot himself dead. Malebogo survived and recovered from the attack, but now uses a wheelchair due to spinal injury.

Malebogo has become an advocate for survivors of gender-based violence (GBV) and domestic abuse on Botswana radio. She has organised workshops and facilitated training with both state and non-governmental organizations in Botswana. She realises that there are cultural aspects that fail to discourage GBV and she volunteers to raise awareness of the need for change.

Malebogo has taught young girls about self-esteem to enable them to resist gender oppression and other types of domestic abuse. She and the Botswana Ministry of Education has created a program for children to help learn about GBV in the home. Malebogo also encourages para sports and sports for women in general.

On 29 March 2017 she and 12 other women of other nationalities were recognized by the US Department of State and given an International Women of Courage Award in Washington, D.C. She was the first Botswanan woman to receive such an award. As the United Nations Population Fund has announced, more than two-thirds of Botswana women have faced some kind of gender-based violence in their life.

== See also ==
- List of peace activists
