= Lisa Kalvelage =

German-born American anti.war activist (1923–2009)

- Born: Lieselotte; April 21, 1923; Nuremberg
- Died: March 8, 2009 (aged 85); Cupertino, California
- Organization: San Jose Peace Center
- Known for: Peace activist

Lieselotte (Lisa) Kalvelage (April 21, 1923–March 8, 2009) was a German-born American who demonstrated against United States militarism during the Vietnam War. She was one of the women who were called the "napalm ladies". In May 1966 at a storage yard in the Alviso district of San Jose, California, they sat in front of a forklift loaded with napalm bombs to protest their delivery to Vietnam. Along with the three other women, she was tried and convicted but given a suspended sentence. Her statement in court was used by Pete Seeger in his song "My Name Is Lisa Kalvelage". Kalvelage, who ran the San Jose Peace Center from 1967 to 1972, remained a peace activist into her eighties. She was active in a number of organizations, including the American Civil Liberties Union and the Women’s International League for Peace and Freedom.

== Early life and family ==
Born in Nuremberg, Germany, on 21 April 1923, Lisa spent her teenage years managing to avoid frequent bombings during World War II by seeking protection in the cellar of her home. After the war, she met Bernard Kalvelage from the US Air Force and emigrated to the United States to marry him in 1948. The couple settled in San Jose, California, where they had five daughters.

== Anti-war activism ==
Shocked that in 1947 the Americans had claimed every German was guilty, Kalvelage sought to bring an understanding of the horrors of war to all she met. During the Vietnam War, she took part in a number of demonstrations against military invasions by the United States.

Kalvelage is remembered in particular for the stand she took with three other women in a protest on May 25, 1966 in Alviso, California. So as not to be taken for hippies, all four of them dressed up in their smartest clothes and sat in front of a forklift loaded with napalm bombs for Vietnam. After confronting the forklift operator and his dogs, Kalvelage and the other three were arrested by the police. In court, they were found guilty of "trespassing to interfere with legal business" but their jail sentences were suspended. Kalvelage's statements at the trial and at the subsequent press conference attracted wide attention. In particular she referred to the Nuremberg principles on war crimes. This led Pete Seeger to create his song "My Name Is Lisa Kalvelage", presenting her statements and what she had endured since her days in Nuremberg.

From 1967 to 1972, she coordinated the San Jose Peace Center. She remained active as a pacifist into her eighties, criticizing the Iraq War since it started in 2003. Activities included training conscientious objectors and protesting the proliferation of nuclear weapons. She contributed to a number of organizations including the American Civil Liberties Union, the Hemlock Society, the Women’s International League for Peace and Freedom and the Humanist Society.

Lisa Kalvelage died in Cupertino, California, on March 8, 2009.
