= Gunhild Emanuelsen =

Norwegian activist, trade unionist and politician

Gunhild Emanuelsen (31 December 1914 – 19 October 2006) was a Norwegian pacifist, women's rights activist, trade unionist and politician. An active member of the Norsk Kvinneforbund (Norwegian Women's Association), she represented Norway in international women's conferences. In the 1990s, she was a leading member of Norway's Nei til atomvåpen which sought to abolish nuclear weapons.

== Biography ==
Born on 31 December 1914 in Kristiania, Gunhild Emanuelsen was the first of three children. She was brought up in cramped conditions in a small flat. Her father was a trade unionist in the Norsk Telegraf og Telefonforbund. She attended middle school but was unable to continue her education after her mother died in an accident when she was 15. She then became the woman responsible for bringing up her siblings.

When she was 20, she began to work at the Standard Telephones and Cables. By the time World War II broke out, Emanuelsen had become an influential member of the trade union. After German executions following the milk strike in September 1941, she became more involved in union work, distributing clandestine newspapers.

After the war, she joined the Norwegian Communist Party but as a result she faced strong opposition from the Labour Party and was forced to leave the Communists. Nevertheless she continued her trade union work, calling for equal pay for men and women. To help her cause, she joined the Women's Association where she fought for equal pay and day care services for children. She also became elected to Oslo city council.
