= Post-Conflict Research Center =

- Formation: 2010
- Type: Non-governmental organization
- Purpose: peace building, post-conflict reconciliation
- Headquarters: Sarajevo (Bosnia-Herzegovina)
- Official language: English and Bosnian
- President and Co-Founder: Velma Šarić (2010-present)
- Website: http://p-crc.org/

The Post-Conflict Research Center (PCRC) is a Sarajevo-based non-governmental organization, which aims to nurture an enabling environment for sustainable peace and facilitate the restoration of inter-ethnic relationships in Bosnia-Herzegovina. PCRC's expertise consists of innovative multimedia projects and creative educational curricula that engage youth in fostering long-lasting tolerance, mutual understanding, and social activism in the Western Balkans region. The center's overall mission is to build a robust network empowering youth with transferable skills and resources to spread an all-encompassing culture of peace among the many ethnic groups composing the country. PCRC's overall strategy encompasses six core areas of operation: creative multimedia, preventing genocide, mass atrocities & violent extremism, peace education, transitional justice, post-conflict research and consultancy.

== History ==
The PCRC was established in 2010 by founder and President Velma Šarić and co-founder and Vice President Leslie Woodward. They first met in Sarajevo when Woodward, a graduate student with substantial experience in strategic peace-building, post-conflict development, and research in developing country contexts, came to attend a study abroad program course designed by Šarić, an experienced journalist and researcher in the fields of sociology and international law. Once Woodward returned to the US, they both developed projects and wrote grants over Skype with the goal of setting up an organization dedicated to building peace in Bosnia-Herzegovina. PCRC today counts 10 staff members, several interns and over 40 experts providing valuable insights and guidance to the organization. PCRC brings citizens of Bosnia-Herzegovina and Western Balkans together to discuss current cultural and political issues and speak their minds with the aim to strengthen local communities in the country.

== Activities and projects ==
PCRC's overall strategy encompasses six core areas of operation: creative multimedia, preventing genocide, mass atrocities & violent extremism, peace education, transitional justice, post-conflict research and consultancy.

- Creative multimedia

The development and production of multimedia materials, tools and platforms aimed to inspire social activism towards positive change, educate viewers about underreported issues, advocate for the underrepresented, and foster tolerance and mutual understanding among divided citizens and youth.

- Preventing genocide, mass atrocities and violent extremism

The provision of prevention-based education and training to civil society actors across the Western Balkans and the strengthening of policies and practices for the prevention of genocide and other mass atrocities. This area of operation also includes the implementation of interventions that focus on addressing sexual violence and impunity for perpetrators.

- Peace education

The creation and implementation of educational programs and curriculum designed around cutting-edge research and best practices in the fields of intercultural dialogue and cooperation, intergroup contact, reconciliation, youth activism and empowerment, and pro-social behavior psychology.

- Transitional justice

PCRC works to advance human rights and transitional justice in Bosnia and Herzegovina and throughout the region via cutting-edge approaches to human rights and transitional justice - including arts-based initiatives and youth education programs - that complement more traditional transitional justice mechanisms and human rights initiatives in the region.

- Post-conflict research

The creation and implementation of methodologies for the collection, analysis and dissemination of rescue and survivor narratives and testimonials, the design and guidance of youth-driven community research, the development of methods for evaluating artistic approaches to peacebuilding, and the coordination and facilitation of international research initiatives and products.

- Consultancy

=== Balkan Diskurs ===
One of the initiatives PCRC works on is Balkan Diskurs, an online platform run by a regional network of young journalists and activists, which aims to address the lack of objective and alternative media. The platform provides a space free from censorship to publish peoples’ opinions and analyses of current issues in the Western Balkans region.

=== Ordinary Heroes ===
Ordinary Heroes is a multimedia educational project that uses photos, films and youth workshops to tell the accounts of four post-conflict regions - Bosnia and Herzegovina, Rwanda, Cambodia, and post-Holocaust Europe, through stories of rescue and courage with the aim to bolstering tolerance, reconciliation and inter-ethnic cooperation. The project encompasses a documentary series that portrays real-life stories of Bosnian citizens who came to rescue others during the war, workshops engaging local youth and a traveling photographic exhibition. Ordinary Heroes was designed by PCRC to foster social healing and reconciliation among inter-groups in Bosnia, Europe and the world.

== Awards and recognitions ==
PCRC has received worldwide recognition for its work. The organization was selected from more than 600 applicants representing over 100 countries to receive the 2014-15 Intercultural Innovation Award given by the United Nations Alliance of Civilizations (UNAOC) and the BMW Group. During the Award Ceremony, held as part of the 6th Global Forum of the UNAOC, UN Secretary-General Ban Ki-Moon personally recognized PCRC and its accomplishments. This organization was also a top-5 finalist in the Council of Europe’s 2015 Diversity Advantage Challenge Award and PCRC's Ordinary Heroes Peacebuilding Program is currently featured as a best practice in a toolkit developed by the Congress of Local and Regional Authorities of the Council of Europe to help elected officials organize intercultural and inter-religious activities. In 2017, PCRC received the Intercultural Achievement Award from the Austrian Federal Ministry for Europe, Integration and Foreign Affairs for Balkan Diskurs – PCRC's independent multimedia platform. PCRC's Bosnian rescuer Mina Jahić was formally recognized by former U.S. Secretary of State, Hillary Clinton during the 60th anniversary of the 1951 Convention Related to the Status of Refugees for saving the life of fellow Bosnian Ferid Spahić.
