= Laurence Deonna =

Swiss journalist, writer and photographer (1937–2023)

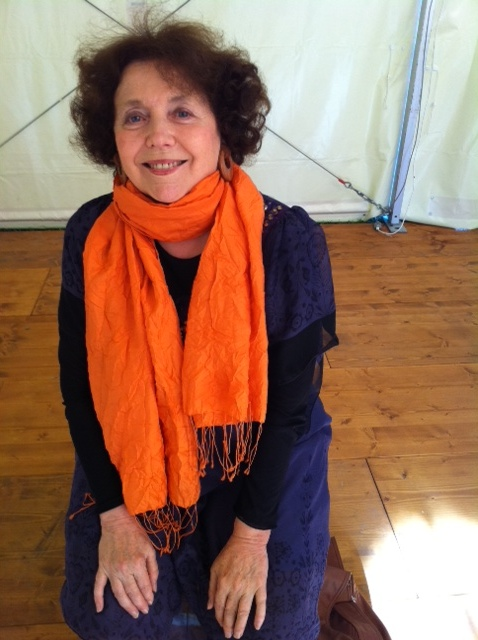
Deonna in 2004

Laurence Deonna (29 January 1937 – 2 August 2023) was a Swiss journalist, writer and photographer who in the late 1960s became a celebrated war reporter in the Middle-East. In 1987, on the basis of her articles, books and photographs promoting international understanding and improvements to the status of women, she was awarded the UNESCO Prize for Peace Education. Deonna published 12 widely translated books.

== Biography ==
Born on 29 January 1937 in Geneva, Laurence Deonna was the daughter of the economist and politician Raymond Deonna, who headed the board of the former Journal de Genève, and his wife Anne-Marie Vernet-Faesch. She left school before matriculating, attended art school in London and returned to Geneva to work in an art gallery. She was married for a short period between 1961 and 1963.

In 1967, invited to report on the Six-Day War, she embarked on a long career as a journalist in the Middle-East, where she took a special interest in the lives of Arab women. Realizing that books offered a more lasting way than newspapers of covering countries in depth, she went on to publish many lengthy accounts of her trips abroad over the next 40 years. They were frequently illustrated with her photographs.

Her works not only focussed on women but revealed her firm conviction that many of the world's problems could be solved if greater concern was devoted to achieving peace. As a result, in 1989 she was awarded the UNESCO Prize for Peace Education. In Switzerland, she was a strong proponent of the 1989 (unsuccessful) referendum to abolish the Swiss army. Her role as a feminist can be seen from the central place she gave to women in all her writings.

Deonna died in Geneva on 2 August 2023, at the age of 86.

== Selected works ==
- Moyen-Orient – femmes du combat, de la terre et du sable, Labor et Fides, Geneva, 1970.
- Le Yémen que j’ai vu, 24 Heures, Lausanne, 1982.
- Yémen. Arthaud, Paris, 1983.
- La guerre à deux voix. Témoignages de "femmes ennemies", Le Centurion, Paris / Labor et Fides, Geneva 1986
- Syriens, Syriennes (1992-1994), Zoé, Geneva, 1986.
- Persianeries - Reportages dans l’Iran des mollahs (1985-1998), Zoé, Genève, 1998.
- Kazakhstan – Bourlinguer en Asie centrale post-communiste, Zoé, Geneva 2001

=== In English ===
- On Persian Roads: Glimpses of Revolutionary Iran, 1985-1998, Pueblo, Colo, Passeggiata Press, 1999. ISBN 9781578890880
- Syrians : A Travelogue (1992-1994), Pueblo, Colo, Passeggiata Press, 1997. ISBN 9781578890408
- Yemen. Boulder, Colo, Three Continents Press, 1991. ISBN 9780894107108
- Travels through Kazakhstan : After the Fall of the Soviet Empire, London, Athena Press, 2010. ISBN 9781847486950
