= France Hamelin =

French Resistant, artist, and pacifist

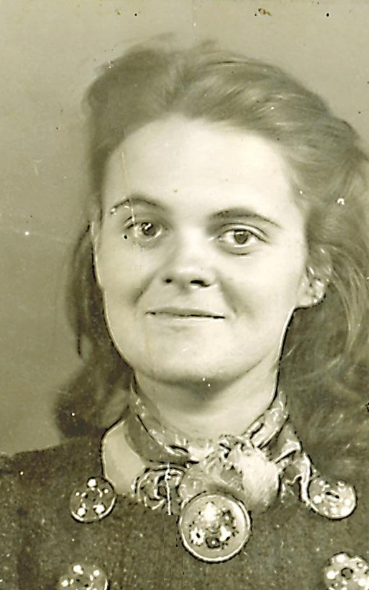
- France Hamelin in 1943
- Born: 14 July 1918; Paris, France
- Died: 9 March 2007 (aged 88); Paris, France
- Spouse: Lucien Hamelin
- Military career
- Allegiance: France
- Branch: French Resistance
- Service years: 1940–1945
- Conflicts: Second World War

France Hamelin (14 July 1918 – 9 March 2007), born France Aline Haberer, was a French artist, a militant pacifist, and a member of the French Resistance during the Second World War.

== Early life ==
France Aline Haberer was born in the 12th arrondissement of Paris, into a Huguenot family originally from Alsace. She grew up in Lot-et-Garonne, but returned to Paris with her family, and studied at the École normale supérieure de Sèvres. She joined a group influenced by the philosopher Émile Chartier, known as "Alain".

== Wartime activities ==
After the outbreak of war, Haberer, who had been studying art and philosophy at Bordeaux, joined the Resistance, where she met her future husband, Lucien Hamelin. She became more active after witnessing the Vel' d'Hiv Roundup in 1942, and began sheltering Jews in her home. Along with Lucien, she was arrested in August 1943, but escaped deportation initially because she was pregnant. Lucien was sent to the Buchenwald concentration camp, while she was held at the La Roquette Prisons. There she began writing and drawing, her theme is the daily life of the female prisoners. She also kept a diary, recording their experiences. In April 1944 she gave birth to a son in a Paris hospital. With help from Michèle Noyer, she escaped with the child and took refuge at the home of a nurse near Clairac in her home region.

== Post-war ==
Lucien Hamelin survived Buchenwald and returned home in 1945; the couple had a further four children. France Hamelin became a teacher of history and geography, and an active peace campaigner, who opposed both the Algerian War and the Vietnam War. She rejected her family's religious beliefs in favour of atheism. She produced no further art, but her work was exhibited, after her death, at the Musée de la Résistance de Châteaubriant.

== See also ==
- List of peace activists
