= La Française (journal) =

French language weekly newspaper in France focused on women's suffrage (1906–1940)

- "Journal de progrès féminin"
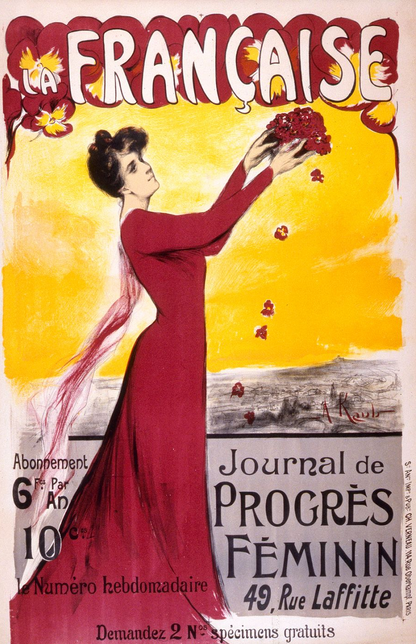
- La Française (1906) poster by Alice Kaub-Casalonga
- Type: reformist feminist
- Format: weekly newspaper
- Founder: Jane Misme
- Editor-in-chief: Jane Misme (1909–1926); Cécile Brunschvicg (1926–1940)
- Founded: 1906
- Ceased publication: 1940
- Political alignment: Popular Front
- Language: French
- Country: France

La Française, subtitled Journal de progrès féminin, was a French language reformist feminist weekly newspaper published in France. It was founded in 1906 by feminist Jane Misme, who ran it until 1926, when Cécile Brunschvicg, the future under-secretary of state under the Popular Front, took over. The title was published until 1940. This weekly gave a national audience to the cause of women's suffrage. It even became the mouthpiece for the French Union for Women's Suffrage, founded by Jeanne Schmahl in 1909.

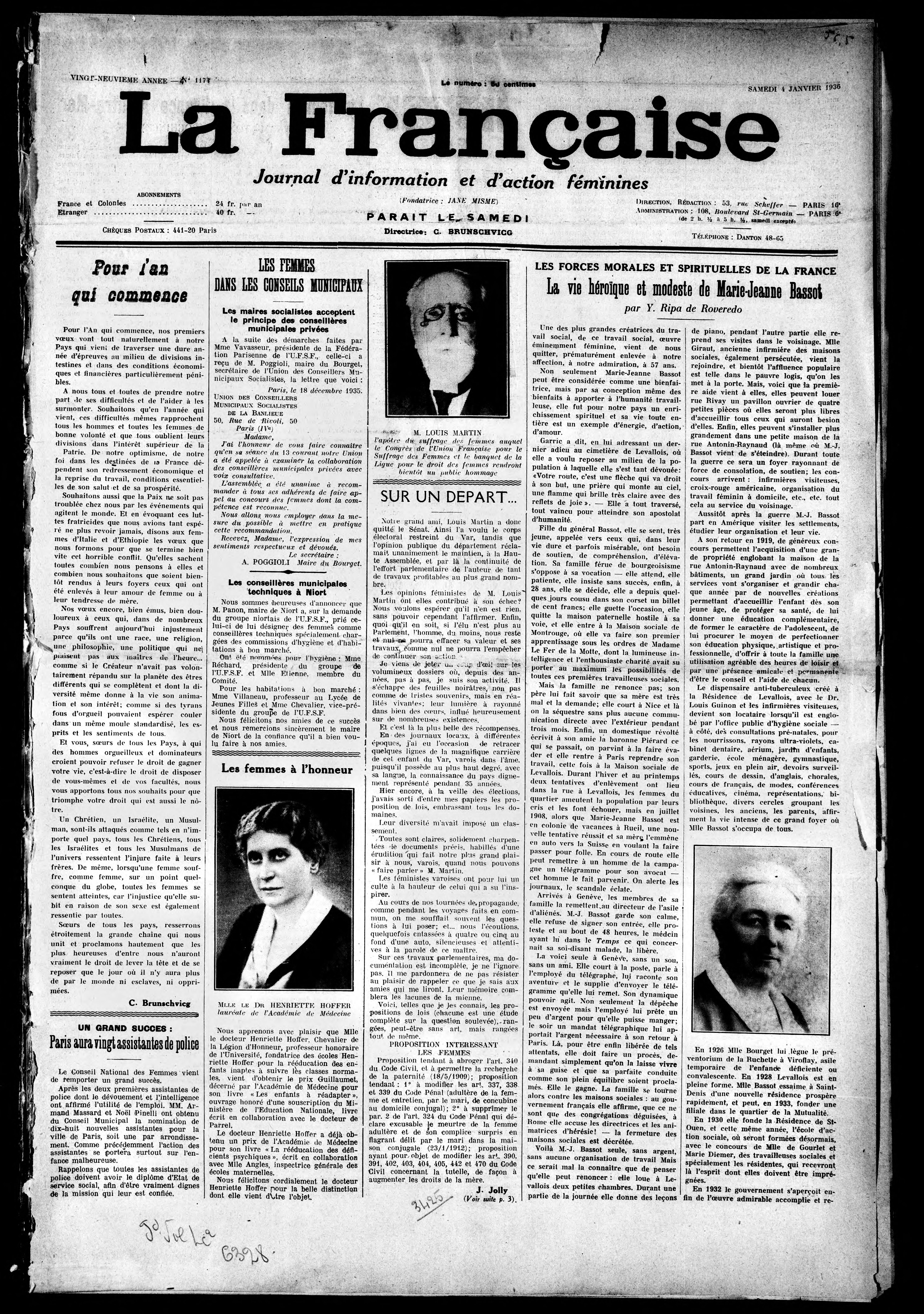
La francaise (4 January 1938)

The paper followed developments in women's legislation in specialized sections such as "Le Féminisme au Parlement" and "Les Lois d'intérêt féminin au Parlement". From 1906 to 1913, Germaine Dulac also wrote "mainly portraits of women and theater reviews". Marianne Rauze was responsible for the "work" section during the same period. Jeanne Oddo-Deflou, Pauline Rebour, and Blanche Vogt were contributors, Alice Kaub-Casalonga created posters for the periodical.

An issue of La Française published on 5 July 1914 presents Condorcet alongside figures of suffragism as well as demands in favor of women's right to vote. On January 20, 1923, La Française wrote the obituary of Camille Bloch. Suzanne Carr directed a family education magazine, L'Ami du Foyer, which joined La Française in 1927. In 1932, the portrait of Reysa Bernson appeared on the cover of La Française.

Under the direction of Brunschvicg, La Française continued to support feminist struggles, while keeping an open eye on French political life and international affairs. Although a member of the Radical Party, Brunschvicg sought to maintain a certain neutrality, but this did not prevent her, for example, from strongly criticizing the participants in the riots of February 6, 1934, or denouncing Nazism as early as 1933. While Brunschvicg was a member of the Popular Front government (under-secretary of state in the Ministry of National Education), she virtually stopped writing for her magazine, before becoming its editor again in June 1937.

The Bibliothèque Marguerite Durand in Paris holds a number of issues.

== Notable people ==
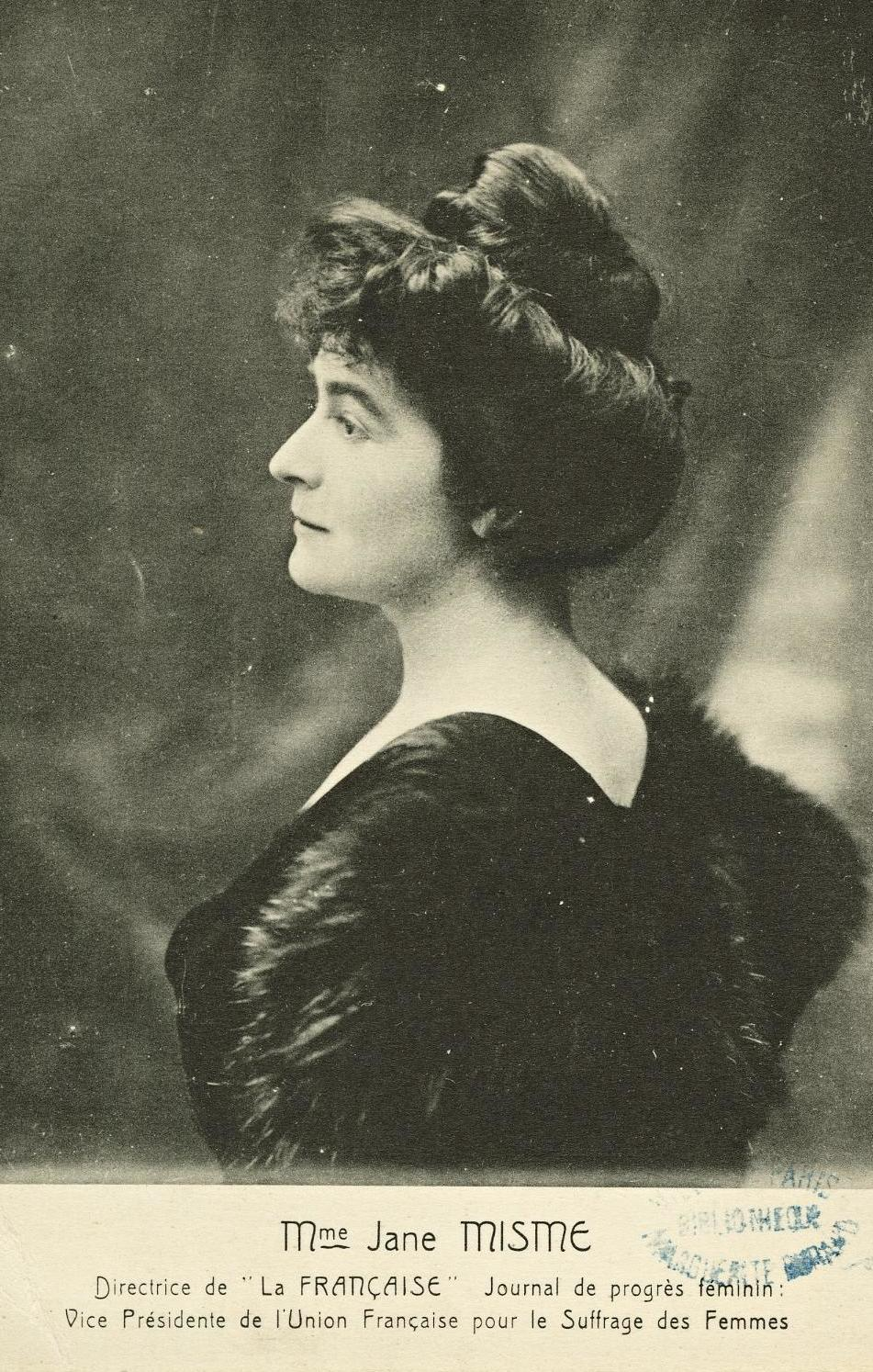
Jane Misme (founder)

- Cécile Brunschvicg
- Germaine Dulac
- Alice Kaub-Casalonga
- Jane Misme
- Jeanne Oddo-Deflou
- Marianne Rauze
- Pauline Rebour
- Blanche Vogt

== See also ==
- Femina
- La Fronde

== Bibliography ==
- Issue no. 1, via Gallica
- L'hebdomadaire La Française (1906-1940) : le journal du féminisme réformiste, article by Cécile Formaglio (pp. 33–47) in Le Temps des Médias, no. 19 (2017), ISBN 9782369426219, Nouveau Monde éditions
