= Helena Kekkonen =

Finnish peace activist and pioneer of peace education

Pulmu Helena Kekkonen née Nousiainen (1926–2014) was a Finnish peace activist and pioneer of peace education. A graduate in chemistry, while working as an educator at the central prison in Sörnäinen, she was inspired by the Brazilian Paulo Freire's 1968 work Pedagogy of the Oppressed. As a result, she started to encourage the prisoners to choose the subjects of their courses and discuss issues of universal concern as well as their own problems. From 1974 to 1986, she served as secretary general of the free educational association Vapaan Sivistystyön Yhteisjärjestön and thereafter of the peace education institut Rauhankasvatusinstituutin (1986–1990). She is remembered in particular for arranging international peace education meetings each year in Finland. For her national and international efforts to foster peace initiatives among educators, Kekkonen was the first person to be awarded the UNESCO Prize for Peace Education when it was initiated in 1981.

== Biography ==
Born on 11 June 1926 in Leppävirta, Pulmu Helena Nousiainen graduated as a chemist but later turned to education for peace. Inspired by the Brazilian pedagogue Paulo Freire, she encouraged Finnish prisoners to choose the subjects of their courses and discuss issues of universal concern as well as their own problems.

In 1975, Kekkonen was elected secretary general of the educational association Vapaan Sivistystyön Yhteisjärjestön. On taking up the post, she commented that she joined the organization committed "no more and no less than to save the world". From 1986 to 1990, she served as secretary general of the peace education institute Rauhankasvatusinstituutin. She later served in positions on a number of international and Finnish organizations, promoting the cause of peace and peace education. She considered it particularly important to ensure that schoolchildren were aware of the need for international solidarity. As a result, she visited schools throughout Finland.

She took a special interest in Africa, promoting the goals of the organizations she represents. In particular, she devoted attention to refugees from Namibia and Angola. Together with her husband Risto Kekkonen, she organized buses to transport school children and provide essential supplies for the refugees. In 1976, she received the Mathilda Wrede Award in recognition of her work with prisoners.

In 1981, Kekkonen was awarded the newly established UNESCO Prize for Peace Education. Nominated by the International Council for Adult Education, she was recognized for encouraging peace education in Finland and for promoting the concept internationally. In particular, over a number of years she succeeded in inviting educators from East and West to her annual meetings on peace education in Finland.

Helen Kekkonen died on 13 May 2014 in Helsinki, aged 87.

== See also ==
- List of peace activists
