= The Oaks (Colbert County, Alabama) =

Historic house in Alabama, United States

- U.S. National Register of Historic Places
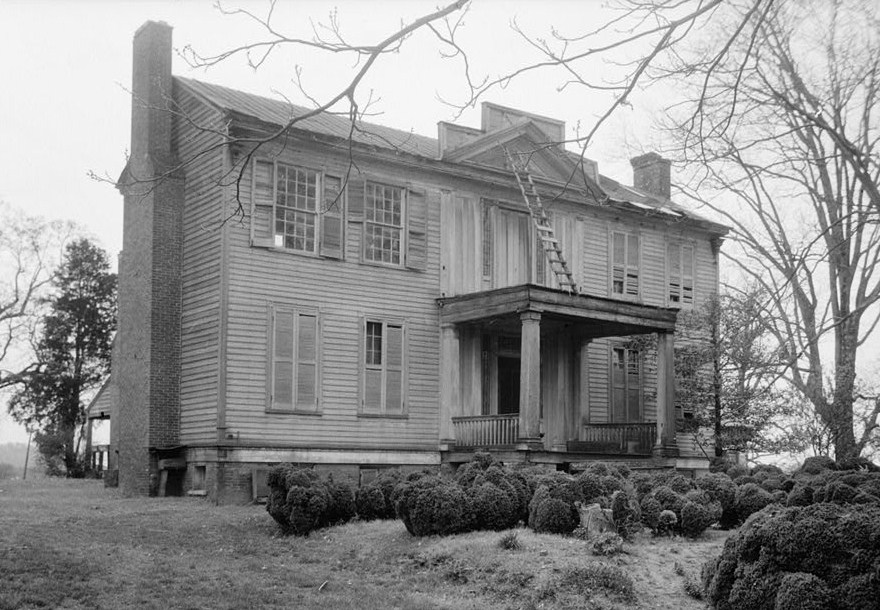
- The house in a 1935 HABS photo

- Location within Alabama Location within the United States
- Nearest city: Tuscumbia, Alabama
- Coordinates: 34°40′27″N 87°35′36″W
- Area: 7.7 acres (3.1 ha)
- Built: 1818
- Architectural style: Georgian
- NRHP reference No.: 76000319
- Added to NRHP: November 7, 1976

The Oaks (also known as Abraham Ricks Plantation) is a historic residence near Tuscumbia in Colbert County, Alabama, United States. Ricks came to North Alabama from Halifax, North Carolina, in the early 1820s. He acquired a large plantation which he sold in 1826 and purchased nearby land, which was worked by the forced labour of enslaved people who he had brought with him. A log house had been built on the new property circa 1818, and Ricks built a new, larger house connected to it which was completed in 1832. The house remained in the family until 1966, and is still in use as a private residence.

The original house is a 1 1/2-story log structure covered with weatherboards. Exterior chimneys rest in each gable end, and a shed roofed porch projects from the rear of the house. The log house is connected to the two-story main house by a one-story, gable roofed hall with two exterior doors and windows matching those of the main house. The front façade of the main house is five bays wide, with a central portico supported by two square columns and topped with a deck. The twin-leaf door is surrounded by sidelights and a transom; a similar door with sidelights opens to the deck above. The portico is flanked by a pair of twelve-over-twelve sash windows on each side on both floors. The interior has a center-hall layout with one room on either side of a main hall.

The house was listed on the National Register of Historic Places in 1976.
