= Napalm ladies =

Napalm ladies was the name attributed to the four American women activists noted for blocking shipments of napalm bombs bound for Vietnam during the Vietnam War. The peace activists were Joyce McLean, Beverly Farquhar, Lisa Kalvelage, and Aileen Hutchinson.

== Background ==
McLean, Farquhar, Kalvelage and Hutchinson were all part of the Women Strike for Peace (WSP), a movement critical of the Cold War and U.S. militarism. By 1965, the movement was active in opposing American involvement in Vietnam and two of its members, Mary Clarke and Lorraine Gordon, became the first representatives of the American peace movement to visit Vietnam. WSP's protests became focused with the Americans' indiscriminate use of defoliants in the conflict, which have injured Vietnamese children. In the spring of 1965, Americans began to use napalm bombs. It was used to char foliage and people in order to flush the enemy into the open.

== Activism ==
Public awareness of the manufacture and impact of napalm bombs increased after reports of the number of casualties, which reached hundreds of thousands, began to surface. McLean, Farquhar, Kalvelage and Hutchinson became interested with the use of napalm bombs as part of the WSP's focus on promoting peace as presented in the context of motherhood. They were consistently exposed to articles and magazines that covered the use of napalm bombings. Their sources included Ladies' Home Journal, which was noted for describing the horrific effects of napalm such as the depicted photographs of burned children.

Acting on shipment information, they blocked the napalm shipments of the Dow Chemical Company in 1966. The bombs were to be shipped at San Jose, California. The day after, they moved their protest to the Alviso district, where they block the transfer of bombs to a barge. This delayed the shipment for a day, as it caused the vessel to miss the tide. The activities of the four ladies also included their attempts to block bomb shipments near Vallejo.

McLean, Farquhar, Kalvelage and Hutchinson were arrested and received suspended sentences. They attracted the attention of the media, which called the women the "napalm ladies" while some labeled them "housewife terrorists".

== Impact ==
According to McLean, they purposely wanted to appear as middle-class housewives during protests. They sought to maximize public influence by playing on their social status and had dressed the part as they wore high heels, stockings, gloves, and pearls during the protest. This move contributed to an increase of images of American women, housewives, and women intellectuals, which helped shift the focus of the Vietnam War away from the military campaign to its broader social and psychological impact. In January 1967, 2,500 WSP marchers protested in front of the Pentagon against the war. The activism of the napalm ladies is also said to have a profound impact on young journalists such as The New York Times' Tom Wicker.
