= Sadie Sawyer Hughley =

Sadie Sawyer Hughley (1912–2004) was an African-American civil rights activist.

== Early life ==
Sadie Sawyer (married name Hughley) was born on October 27, 1912, in Texarkana, Arkansas, to Mr. and Mrs. Robert A. and Mattie L. Sawyer. She was one of six children. Her parents were peace activists, which influenced her later work. She attended Bishop College, where she received a B.S. degree, and completed graduate-level work at both Langston College and Kansas University. In 1941, she moved with her husband, economist Reverend Dr. J. Neal Hughley, to Durham, North Carolina where Dr. Hughley took a position as a professor at North Carolina Central University.

Sadie Hughley then pursued and completed an MS degree in Library Science from North Carolina Central University (NCCU). In 1957, Hughley worked as supervisor and acting chief librarian at NCCU until 1978. She died on March 8, 2004.

== Activism ==
In the 1950s, Hughley served as vice president of the southeastern regional chapter of the Women's International League for Peace and Freedom (WILPF). She would later serve as vice president of the national chapter. As a member of WILPF, she worked alongside Coretta Scott King, Angela Davis, and other notable women. In 1961, Hughley's husband joined WILPF, and along with many of WILPF's foremothers, they worked to link the international peace movement to domestic race issues, such as the Civil Rights Movement. Sadie Hughley was instrumental in pointing to the hypocrisies within the American peace and freedom movements abroad that ignored the oppression of people of color in the U.S. In 1970, she went on an 8-day fact-finding mission in Vietnam with colleagues in WILPF to better understand the lived experience of the people there, and how the war was affecting their communities. According to historian Gerald Gill, this mission marked the beginning of "an ideological transformation in the public political critiques of African American peace activist women."
