= Suzuko Numata =

- 沼田鈴子
- Born: July 30, 1923; Osaka, Japan
- Died: July 12, 2011 (aged 87); Hiroshima, Japan

Suzuko Numata (Japanese: 沼田鈴子, romanized: Numata Suzuko; July 30, 1923 - July 12, 2011) was a Japanese peace activist and a survivor of the atomic bombing of Hiroshima.

== Early life ==
Suzuko Numata was born in Osaka. When she was five, her family moved to Hiroshima after her father, Hideta (d. 1956), got a job there. She had an older brother, a younger sister, and a younger brother.

Numata was in eighth grade when the Sino-Japanese War began. She recalled being taught nationalism and militarism at school, and never learning about Japanese aggression towards other nations or atrocities committed by the Japanese army.

In 1942, Numata graduated from school and was hired to work at the Hiroshima Communications Bureau alongside her father; her younger sister joined them in April of that year. She and her fiancé were engaged in October 1943. In March 1944, her fiancé left for war after being drafted. Shortly afterward, in April, her younger brother entered the military training school in Matsuyama, Ehime Prefecture.

Beginning in May 1945, Numata was assigned to work at the Communications Installation Division for Defense, a department of the Hiroshima Communications Bureau.

== Bombing of Hiroshima and aftermath ==
In August 1945, Numata, then 22, worked at the Hiroshima Communications Bureau, about 1.3 kilometers from the hypocenter of the bomb. She was on the fourth floor of the building when the attack occurred on August 6, and her left ankle was injured when she was buried under debris. She was rescued from the ensuing fire in the building; about 80 other people in the building died. Her immediate family survived, including her father and younger sister.

On August 10, Numata's left leg was amputated above the knee, without anesthetic, after her wound became gangrenous. On August 15, her younger brother returned home from military service. Around that time, Numata soon learned her fiancé, who had been scheduled to return home in early August for their wedding, had been killed in battle in July 1945. She briefly contemplated suicide, but was inspired to continue living by the Chinese parasol trees in the courtyard of the Bureau, which had survived the bombing. Years later, the trees would be replanted in Peace Memorial Park.

In March 1946, Numata was filmed by Herbert Sussan, a member of the United States Strategic Bombing Survey team.

Numata underwent four more operations on her leg before being released from the hospital in March 1947. She returned home in an improvised wheelchair, made by her mother from a pram.

== Career ==
In 1951, Numata began working as a lecturer of home economics at Yasuda Women's College. She recalled giving students advice for their relationships or helping them to find partners. She retired in 1979, after 28 years of teaching.

== Activism ==
Following the bombing, Numata did not speak about her experiences. However, in 1981, Numata saw the 1946 footage of herself, which she had long forgotten about, as part of the 10 Feet Film Project, a campaign which allowed Japanese citizens to buy footage filmed by the United States Strategic Bombing Survey team. She was inspired to begin working as an activist, and was further encouraged by her former students.

Numata spoke to many schoolchildren about her experiences. She especially enjoyed when they referred to her as "grandma".

In 2001, an oral history told by Numata was filmed. It is held by the Imperial War Museum in England.

== Personal life ==
Numata never married. Although there was one prospective candidate she met while working as a teacher, his parents disapproved of their son marrying a hibakusha.
