= Inez Jackson =

American activist, teacher, and postal worker (1907–1993)

- Jackson in 1989
- Born: Inez C. Young; January 9, 1907; Kaufman County, Texas, U.S.
- Died: November 19, 1993 (aged 86); San Jose, California, U.S.
- Other name: Inez C. Jackson
- Occupations: Teacher, agricultural worker, postal clerk

Inez Jackson (January 9, 1907 – November 19, 1993) was an American activist, teacher, and postal worker. After earning a teaching degree at Langston University, she taught school in Shawnee, Oklahoma. When her husband was obliged to serve during World War II at the Oakland shipyards, she relocated to California, but as an African American, was unable to secure work as a teacher. Refusing to work as a domestic servant, she worked in the agricultural sector picking fruit. She became the first Black postal clerk hired in San Jose, California, in 1949. As an activist, she was a member of the National Association for the Advancement of Colored People (NAACP), the Young Women's Christian Association (YMCA), and the Women's International League for Peace and Freedom and fought for civil rights issues, arguing against discriminatory policies like redlining and unequal education, employment, and organizational policies. As a pacifist, she encouraged non-violent demonstration. From 1969 to 1973 she was president of the local branch of the NAACP and was president of the area YWCA from 1973 to 1976. She was a founder of the African American Community Service Agency in 1978, and the library located in the facility was named in her honor in 1995.

== Early life and education ==
Inez C. Young was born on January 9, 1907, in Kaufman County, Texas to Tessie (née Ollison) and Cazzee (or Cassee) Young. Her father was a farmer, and after living briefly in Forney, she was raised in Terrell, Texas. The main advocate for African-American education in Terrell from 1900 to 1944 was William Henry Burnett, a jazz musician and the principal of the Black high school. Young graduated in 1925, as salutatorian of her class and moved to Shawnee, Oklahoma, where she joined the local YWCA, becoming its president in 1926. She attended Langston University, graduating with a teaching certificate. On July 7, 1929, she married Leon Jackson in Shawnee. Leon was a self-employed barber and Jackson became a math teacher in the segregated school system in Shawnee. The couple had six children before Leon received notification in 1944 from the Selective Service. Choosing to work in the Oakland shipyards, rather than military service abroad, Leon moved to California leaving his wife and children to finish out the school year.

== California (1944–1986) ==
Jackson was excited to move to California, where she was told that schools were integrated. When she applied to teach at the San Jose Public Schools, she was told that the school system did not hire Black teachers and was offered a position as a cleaner. Refusing the position, she sought work through an employment agency, but was told the only available jobs were in domestic service. Having gone to school to avoid working as a maid, Jackson found a job picking fruit at a local cannery. At the time, San Jose was a city of around 80,000 people and only 515 of them were Black. Opportunities were limited and Jackson found the racism confusing because it was not defined like it was under Jim Crow laws in The South. Because there were no role models, Jackson began joining local service clubs to improve the options of African Americans. She joined the local Parent–teacher association (PTA), the League of Women Voters of California, the National Association for the Advancement of Colored People (NAACP), the Garden City Women's Club, the Women's International League for Peace and Freedom (WILPF) and the YWCA, among other organizations. She entwined her pacifism and work against discrimination, considering racism to equate to violence and a lack of freedom and held meetings in her home three or four nights each week.

Although activists protested against the hiring criteria of the school board, they were unable to effect change. The Jackson family had difficulty making ends meet until President Truman issued Executive Order 9980 in 1948, abolishing segregation in the civil service. Although Jackson took and passed the civil service examination, the local post office refused to hire her until activists inundated the office with mail, phone calls, and personal visits. In 1949, she was finally hired as the first Black postal clerk in San Jose. (Note: Both Michalene Busico and Linda Goldston, reporters for the San Jose Mercury News give the date as 1945; however, scholars Joyce Blackwell and Herbert Ruffin II, note that she was hired after the desegregation of the civil service.) Finding reasonably priced housing in the Bay Area for people of color was difficult because of redlining practices. Initially, the Jacksons settled in Northside, but found that despite stable employment, they were restricted to living in certain areas. To protest the situation, Jackson encouraged her fellow postal worker, Mary Anne Smith, to become San Jose's first Black real estate agent. J. S. Williams, a White real estate agent assisted Smith and hired her, as well as another Black agent, Berthina Nelson. The group worked actively from the 1950s to 1970s to desegregate neighborhoods that were restricted to white residents. The Jacksons eventually bought a home in an area referred to as "Mexican Valley" from a seller who agreed to the transaction to spite the next-door neighbor, Jackson's boss. In 1951, she successfully pressed the police department to hire a Black officer, Francis Tanner, and continued to agitate for more representation on the force.

Along with events happening throughout the country, in the 1960s race-relations in San Jose were tense. Jackson worked toward lessening tensions by urging community action and non-violent means of protest. Following the model of Greensboro and Oklahoma City sit-ins at lunch counters she urged WILPF members and students from San Jose State University to demonstrate at the Kress and Woolworth five and dime stores in downtown San Jose. She also encouraged students to challenge norms at the university which exploited Black students, faculty, and athletes, such as discrimination in hiring, housing, scholarships, fraternal membership, and student government. In 1966, students Harry Edwards and Kenneth Noel, with guidance from Jackson, formed United Black Students for Action (UBSA) and issued demands for the university to commit to eliminating institutional racism. She became president of the local branch of the NAACP in 1969, serving a four-year term. She also served on the Santa Clara County Commission of Human Relations.

In 1970, the local YWCA changed its membership rules and began to recruit women of color. Latina women like Carmen Ponce and Rose Romero joined that year and in 1971, new members included Dolores Cedillo, and Carmen Garcia. The first Black members were Betty Baldwin and Yvonne Stanley, followed by Jackson, who became the first Black president of the local YWCA board in 1973. She led the organization until 1976. Under her tenure, a rape crisis center and hotline was opened, as well as various consciousness-raising and do-it-yourself groups to help women network about education, jobs, marital issues, and other topics. In 1978, Jackson founded the African American Community Service Agency as a center to provide education, training, health and well-being services to the Black community. Smith told the story of how the African American Community Service Agency came into being to The Mercury News in 1989. Unable to find a rental space to organize community events, Jackson remembered vacant building that had formerly been a fire station that was across the street from the Antioch Baptist Church, where she had volunteered for twenty years. She called the mayor and asked if the building qualified for the program the city offered to rent vacant properties it owned for $1 per year to community service organizations. When they confirmed that it did, she made the arrangements and notified Smith to pick up the key. She remained active in the community into her 80s.

== Death and legacy ==
Jackson died in Santa Clara County, California on November 19, 1993, at her San Jose home from Alzheimer's disease. Academic Herbert G. Ruffin, II, has said that Jackson was a "local civil rights legend", and called her "one of the pillars of the Black South Bay community". On October 19, 1995, the Inez C. Jackson Historical Library opened in the community center, she had founded. The goal of the library was to collect the history and contributions of the Black community in San Jose, and her papers are housed there. An oral interview of Jackson was taken in 1985 by Judith Porter Adams and is housed in the Women's International League for Peace and Freedom Collection in the Archive of Recorded Sound at Stanford University.
