= Housmans =

Radical bookstore in London, England

Coordinates: 51.53116°N 0.12115°W

Housmans Bookshop Ltd
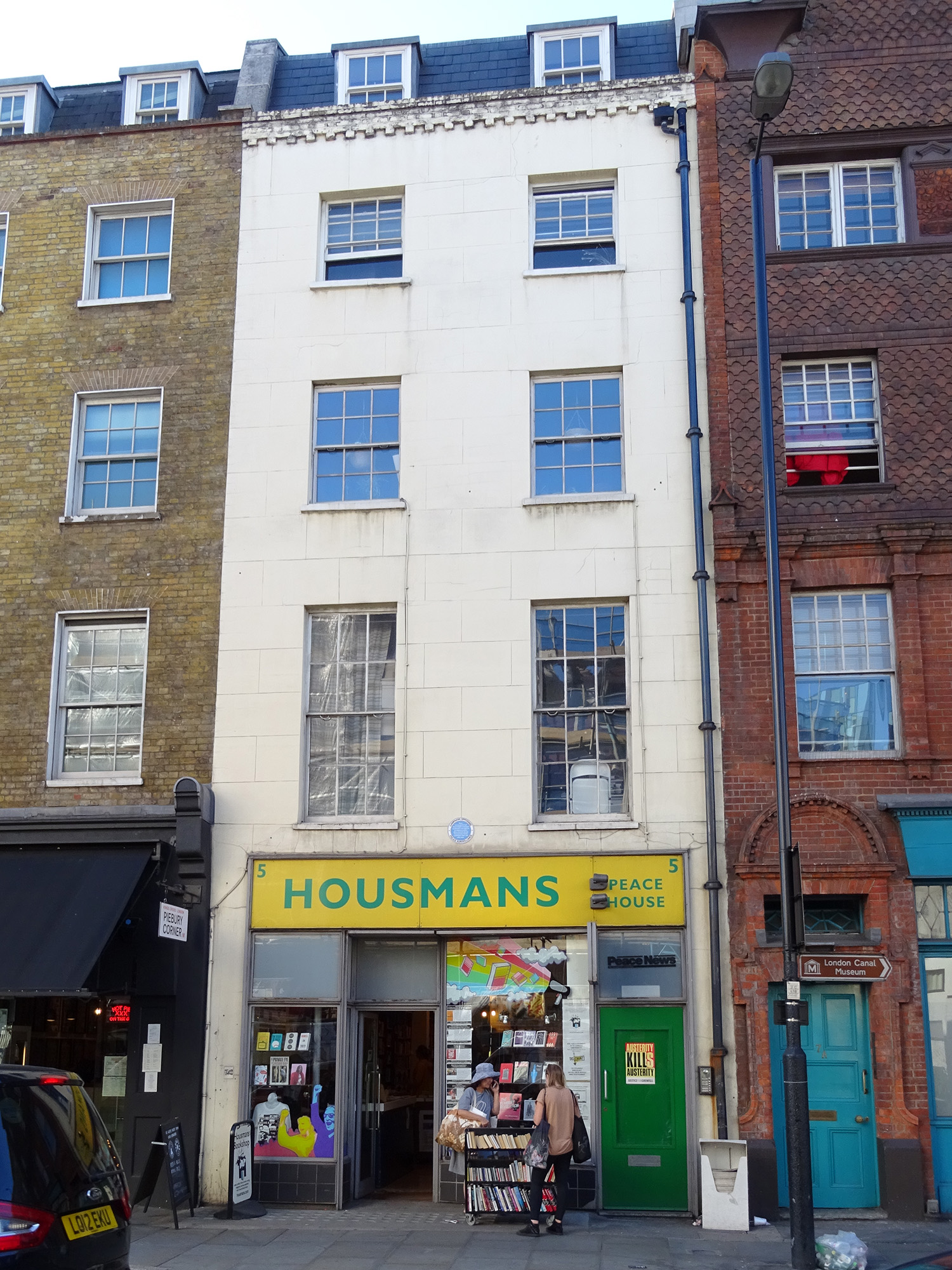
- The front of Housmans
- Formation: 26 October 1945; 81 years ago
- Founder: Friends and members of Peace Pledge Union and Peace News
- Type: Nonprofit
- Registration no.: 01024773
- Purpose: Retail bookshop associated with Peace News
- Location: 5 Caledonian Road, London
- Products: Books, magazines, stationery, badges, gifts
- Owner: Peace News Trustees Ltd
- Key people: Laurence Housman (co-founder)
- Website: housmans.com

Housmans is a bookshop in London, England, and is one of the longest-running radical bookshops in the United Kingdom. The shop was founded by a collective of pacifists in 1945 and has been based in Kings Cross, since 1959. Various grassroots organisations have operated from its address, including the Gay Liberation Front, the Campaign for Nuclear Disarmament, and London Greenpeace. Housmans shares its building with its sister organisation Peace News.

== The bookshop ==
Housmans' not-for-profit shop specialises in books on feminism, anarchism, anti-racism, anti-fascism, LGBTQIA+ politics, socialism, and nonviolence. It also stocks radical and socially engaged fiction, children's books, graphic novels, magazines, zines, and poetry alongside new and second-hand books, Housmans stocks cards, calendars, White Poppies, and merchandise from Lesbians and Gays Support the Miners (including the "Pits and Perverts" T-shirt). An online store was launched in March 2010.

Housmans is managed by a trust and is a National Living Wage employer.

=== Reading groups ===
Current book groups include Housmans' Feminist Sci-Fi Book Club, Housmans' Queer Book Club, the Fuse Book Club, and Self-care as an act of warfare: a Black women's reading group.

=== Peace Diary ===
Housmans launched its first Peace Diary in 1953. The diaries are published annually and include an international peace directory listing more than 1,400 organisations around the world.

=== Live events ===
Regular live events are hosted at Housmans including panels, book readings, and musical performances. These are streamed on Housmans' YouTube channel and include appearances from Naomi Klein, Emma Dabiri, and John Sinclair. Guests from the performing arts include Maxine Peake and Christopher Eccleston.

== Founders and pacifist origins ==
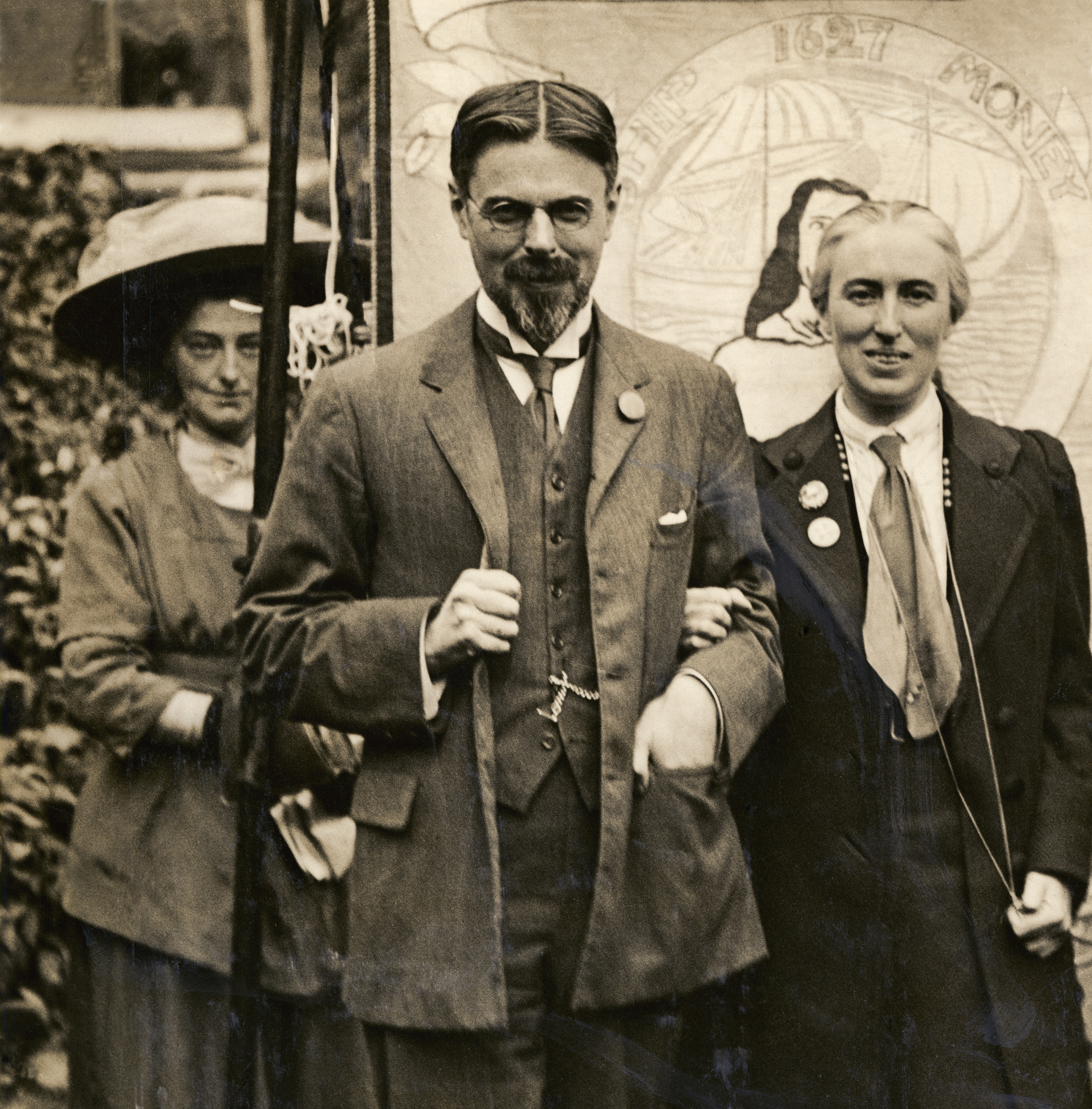
Co-founder Laurence Housman c.1910.

Housmans' origins began in the 1930s with key players in the British peace movement connected to the pacifist organisation Peace Pledge Union and one of its projects: the pacifist magazine Peace News.

Temporary bookshops affiliated with the Peace Pledge Union existed as early as 1936 with one at 36 Ludgate Hill, London. By 1946 a bookshop was operating within the Peace Pledge Union headquarters at Dick Shepherd House, 6 Endsleigh Street in Bloomsbury, London, but its business lacked a shop window.

A plan for a permanent bookshop was envisioned by a key sponsor of the Peace Pledge Union, the pacifist author and playwright Laurence Housman. After World War II, Housman proposed a shop that would promote "ideas of peace, [...] human rights and a more equitable economy by which future wars, and all their inherent suffering, might be avoided."

The name of Housmans was given to the bookshop in Laurence Housman's honour and its cofounders include staff and sponsors of the Peace Pledge Union and Peace News. Directors appointed to the original company limited guarantee include the pacifist writer Vera Brittain, London bookseller Llewelyn Kiek, and literary critic Hugh I'Anson Fausset. Further cofounders include Peace Pledge Union staffers John Barclay and Trefor Rendall Davies, and the business manager of Peace News, Harry Mister. Mister would go on to work as Housman's business manager until 1976.

In 1972 the company was re-structured with Housmans Bookshop Ltd newly created to separate the management of Housmans from that of Peace News, while Peacenews Trustees Ltd (renamed Peace News Trustees Ltd in December 2025) continued to oversee both organisations.

Housmans is sometimes referred to as an anarchist bookshop.

== History of the premises and business ==
=== Early days at Shaftesbury Avenue ===
The original Housmans bookshop was located at 124 Shaftesbury Avenue, London and opened for business on 26 October 1945. The building had been repaired after bomb damage.

Attendees of the shop's opening ceremony included Laurence Housman, the anarchist author Herbert Read, editor of The New Statesman Kingsley Martin, the campaigner Irene Barclay, Howard Whitten, Patrick Figgis, Doris Figgis, Trefor Rendall Davies, Llewelyn Kiek, Hugh I’Anson Fausset, Harry Mister, Eileen Ager, Geoffrey Gilbert, Henry Rutland, Duncan Christie and John Barclay.

==== Endsleigh cards ====
In 1948, business manager Harry Mister launched Endsleigh Cards, named after the original street location of the Peace Pledge Union offices. Endsleigh Cards was a trading brand of Peace News and its greeting cards were stocked in Housmans.

===== Loss of premises =====
In 1948, an increase in lease renewal costs prompted the Peace Pledge Union to close the physical shop and pass ownership of its trading name to the Peace News company. Housmans continued to trade as a mail-order bookselling business and lacked physical premises until 1958.

=== Relocation to Kings Cross ===
In 1958, a freehold building at 5 Caledonian Road in Kings Cross was acquired after a £5,000 gift from Reverend Tom Willis of Hull (the equivalent today of £120,000) and further donations from other Peace News supporters. Peace News moved into the 100-year-old building's upper floors, while Housmans resumed business on the lower floor.

The renovated premises were opened by bookshop manager Dora Dawtry on 21 November 1959. In attendance were Vera Brittain, editor of Peace News Hugh Brock, British pacifist Myrtle Solomon, George Plume, Peace Pledge Union chairman Stuart Morris, Roy Fry of Pacifist Youth Action Group, Peace News trustee Ian Dixon, pacifist and suffragist Sybil Morrison, Harry Mister, Sue Mister, Val Mister, and Ivy Mister. Also in attendance was Reverend Tom Willis.

In 1961, Peace News and the Peace Pledge Union separated and Housmans remained associated with Peace News. The Peace News office continues to be located at Housmans and operates as a sister organisation.

=== Nuclear disarmament and the peace symbol ===
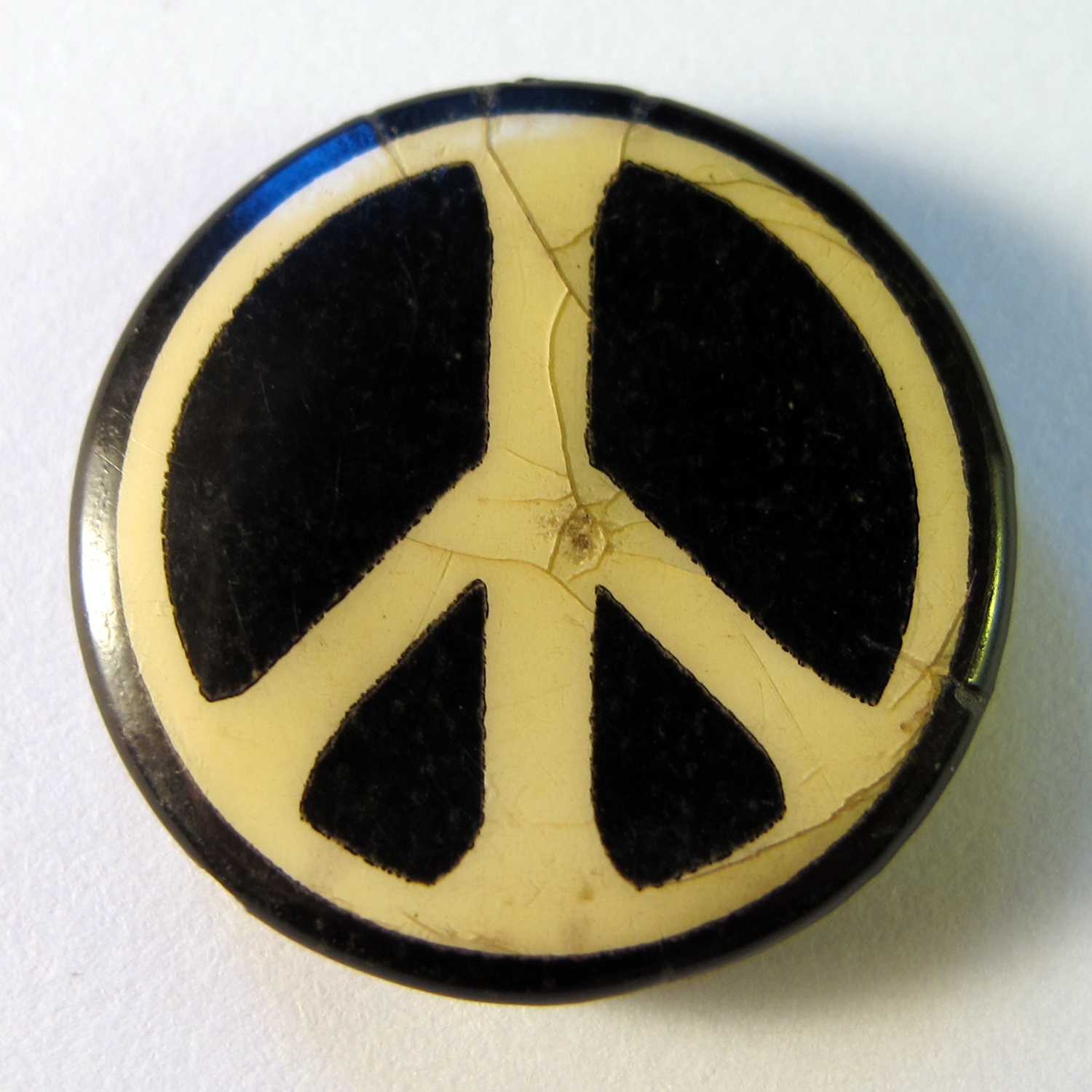
A CND badge from the 1960s

From the late 1950s and early 1960s, Housmans stocked material from organisations advocating nuclear disarmament including the Campaign for Nuclear Disarmament and the Committee of 100.

In 1958, artist and designer Gerald Holtom, presented early designs of the nuclear disarmament symbol within the Peace News office at Housmans' address. According to peace campaigner Michael Randle, Housmans business manager Harry Mister saw the peace symbol on Peace News leaflets and said: "What on earth were you, Pat (Arrowsmith) and Hugh (Brock) thinking about when you adopted that symbol? It doesn’t mean a thing and it will never catch on!" Peace News says that, "to his credit, for the rest of his life Harry was never to be seen without a badge bearing the symbol on his lapel."

The Direct Action Committee Against Nuclear War (formerly known as the Committee for Direct Action Against Nuclear War) were based in a small office in the building.

=== Bombings ===
==== 1974 London pillar box bombings ====
At 5:50pm on 25 November 1974, an IRA bomb exploded in a pillar box outside Housmans as part of the London pillar box bombings. No injuries were sustained and the shop windows remained intact, but the explosion destroyed the Campaign Against Arms Trade first newsletter, which had been posted ten minutes prior to the incident. Peace News reported that the attack was one of several warning bombs that followed an announcement from then Home Secretary Roy Jenkins of emergency powers under Section 8 of the Prevention of Terrorism (Temporary Provisions) Act 1974.

==== 1978 letter bomb ====
On 4 July 1978, the Peace News offices received a letter bomb. Housmans worker, Stewart Porte, was hospitalised for burns sustained to his face, hands, and chest. The letter bomb was alleged to have been from the neo-Nazi organisation Column 88. Similar attacks were made on the Socialist Workers Party and Anti-Nazi League offices in the months prior to the attack on Housmans.

Housmans' address had received a threatening letter three months before the explosion. The letter read: "Watch out you're next" and its use of fascist symbols and the figure "88" led to further suspicions that Column 88 were responsible for the letter bomb. Housmans had alerted the police of this threat, but the police did not investigate until after the letter bomb had exploded at the bookshop.

=== 1970s and 1980s gay liberation ===
Housmans has a long affiliation with the gay liberation movement whilst its cofounder, Laurence Housman, was openly homosexual. In the 1970s and 1980s Housmans was one of a few bookshops in the UK that permitted gay and lesbian literature on its shelves.

==== Gay Liberation Front and Switchboard ====
The Gay Liberation Front's offices were located at 5 Caledonian Road in the 1970s. Graffiti from this era was discovered in Housmans' basement in 2020. Messages include: "Run your own Life", "Homosexuals Unite", and "Gay is good so don’t be scared to tell anybody".

From 1974, The London Lesbian and Gay Switchboard was based on the premises for nearly 20 years. Switchboard volunteers on the premises included Mark Ashton and Mike Jackson, co-founders of the Lesbians and Gays Support the Miners, and Switchboard's director Diana James, the first transgender person to join Switchboard. In her interview with the 5 Cally Road research project Diana James recalled a feminist protest outside Housmans against the bookshop's decision to stock On Our Backs, the first women-run erotica magazine and the first magazine to feature lesbian erotica for a lesbian audience in the United States.

==== Customs raid on 'indecent' literature ====
The majority of Housman's gay literature had to be shipped in from the United States. In May 1984, a missing order from Giovanni's Room, a gay bookshop based in Philadelphia was confiscated by HM Customs and Excise who deemed the LGBT books indecent under the 1876 Customs Consolidation Act. The Act permitted courts to judge homosexual material as obscene or indecent, despite the decriminalisation of the 1967 Sexual Offences Act. The large-scale raid effected other radical and LGBT booksellers, including Gay's the Word and seized works included titles by Christopher Isherwood, Tennessee Williams, and Jean Genet. Housmans did not take legal action, but joined a campaign of resistance launched by the Federation of Radical Booksellers to resist the raids and prosecution of booksellers.

=== Resisted demolishment and Peacemeal Wholefoods ===
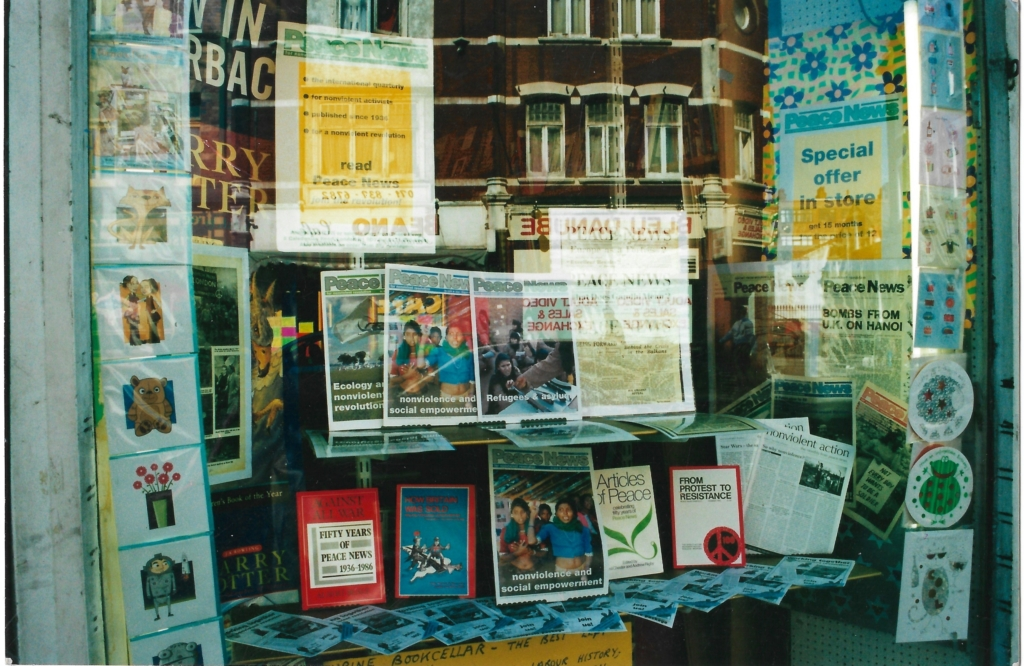
A window display at Housmans circa 2000 unearthed by the 5 Cally Road research project.

In the 1980s, a partial demolishment of Caledonian Road was proposed, but the trustees of Housmans refused to sell the building to developers.

In 1985, trustees of Peace News established a retail store named Peacemeal Wholefoods opposite Housmans. Its founders and staff included Housmans' employees, Nigel Kemp and Alexander Donaldson, who would go on to found Judd Books together in 1992.

=== 1990s and 2010s ===
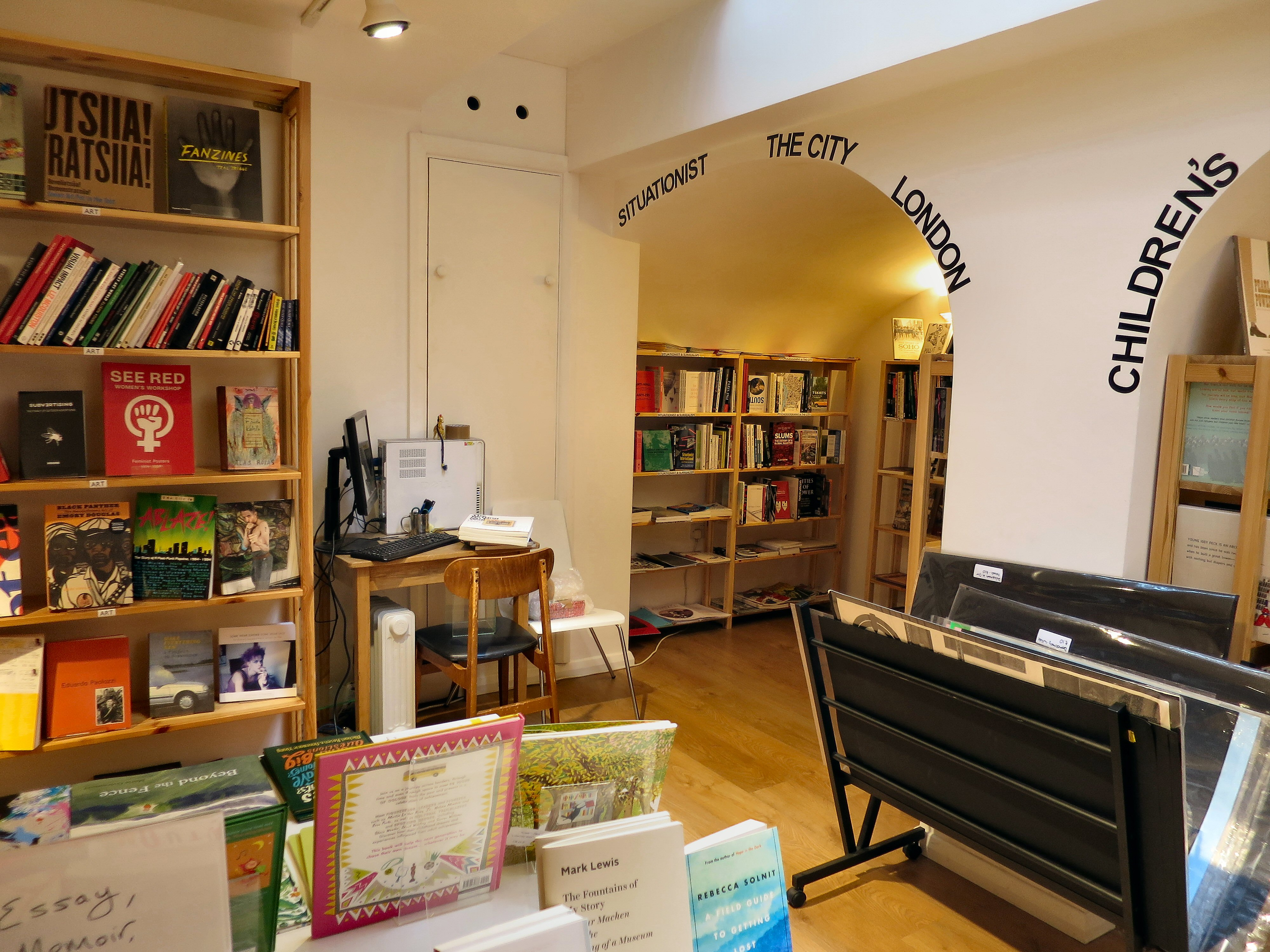
The Vaults in the basement of Housmans bookshop

In the 1990s, the 'McLibel' defence campaign was based in Housmans when members of London Greenpeace were sued by McDonalds for libel in 1990.

In 2016, Housmans expanded its premises with a basement area dubbed 'The Vaults'. Thee space was partly funded by an online crowdfunding campaign and a launch party was held 3 December of the same year. The Vaults include an expanded selection of fiction, graphic novels, poetry, art and art theory, children's books and more. Newly expanded sections in the original upstairs area of Housmans include titles on anti-racism, health and disability politics, and Irish history. This expansion coincided with the shop's 70th anniversary.

In 2019, the English all-female DIY punk/riot grrrl band Dream Nails released a live album Take Up Space - a recording of an acoustic performance at Housmans.

=== Present day ===
==== 5 Cally Road research project ====
5 Cally Road: 60 Years of Books and Activism is an oral history project exploring and celebrating the history of the building. From 2020 to 2021 a team of volunteers (aged 18–25) researched and archived the history of Housmans' premises. Volunteers recorded oral history interviews and recorded archive material whilst producing fictional queer monologues, original songs, poems, and verbatim radio plays.

A 5 Cally Road volunteer told Peace News, "We wanted to relate the building’s history to the present day and demonstrate that the ideas and struggles we’ve documented are still thriving and making waves."

Interviewees included, Goeff Hardy who spoke to researchers in 2021. His father was involved in the Committee of 100 and Hardy was involved in anarchist groups and the Gay Liberation Front. In his interview he said:

"Housmans wasn't only a bookshop in a building. Housmans was part of a whole liberation, anarcho-pacifist socialist movement. It was the centre of activism for many people. It's amazing it's survived.

The project was managed by Rosa Schling and was organised by the oral history NGO On The Record. The project was supported by The National Lottery Heritage Fund.

==== Reverberations sound-installation ====
From July to September 2021, the British artist Wajid Yaseen used Housmans to stage an immersive sound installation. It combined oral history interviews recorded during the 5 Cally Road project with sound design and music by the anarcho-punk band Crass. Reverberations was composed by Christina Radukic, Connie Hatt, Keir Chauhan, Laura Toms, Naoise Murphy, Tania Aubeelack, and Will Hecker.

== Groups in residence ==
Various grassroots organisations have shared the premises or a postal address with Housmans and Peace News. They include (but are not restricted to):

- The London region for the Campaign for Nuclear Disarmament
- The Gay Liberation Front
- The London Lesbian and Gay Switchboard, for nearly 20 years
- London Greenpeace
- Campaign Against Climate Change
- Committee for Direct Action Against Nuclear War
- British Withdrawal from Northern Ireland Campaign, mailing address in the 1970s
- Radical Research Services
- Finsbury Park Typesetters, sister company to Peace News
- Nudist Challenge, radical protest movement
- The ABC defence campaign in the ABC trial, 1970s
- Wildcat, monthly anarchist newspaper from 1974 to 1975, not to be confused with the communist Wildcat newsletter of the 1980s and 1990s
- Network for Peace
- No Sweat, holds monthly organising meetings on the first Thursday of every month
- ForcesWatch, a UK organisation dedicated to investigating militarisation, military ethics and human rights concerns.
- Oromo Relief Association, has supported Oromo refugees and asylum seekers since 1982
- Pax Christi
- Kings Cross Railway Lands Group, an umbrella group of community organisations addressing strategic planning issues, formed in 1987
- Prometheus Theatre Company, in the 1980s
- The 'McLibel' defence campaign, in the 1990s
- War Resisters International, since 1994
- Greece Solidarity Campaign
- Kurdistan Secular Centre UK, 2016 to 2018
- Left Book Club Ltd, 2014 to 2018
- Another Europe is Possible, from 2016
- Bi Pride UK, since 2018
- The Federation of Iraqi Refugees, since 2021
- Peace Brigades International

== Arrests and surveillance ==
=== 1974 arrest of Pat Arrowsmith ===
On 7 September 1974, peace campaigner and co-founder of Campaign for Nuclear Disarmament, Pat Arrowsmith, was arrested in the Peace News office. Arrowsmith had escaped from Askham Grange open prison where she was serving an 18-month sentence for offences against the Incitement to Disaffection Act 1934 after distributing leaflets at a British army base urging soldiers to refuse to serve in Northern Ireland.

After absconding from prison, Arrowsmith spoke at an anti-fascist demonstration in Hyde Park and befriended lesbian and gay attendees. In an interview with the 5 Cally Road research project, Nettie Pollard (a member of the Gay Liberation Front), recalled Arrowsmith saying to LGBT protestors, "Well, why don't we go to Housmans?" Upon arrival, the group contacted The Press Association to say, "there's a fugitive at Housmans, 5 Caledonian Road." Their photographs appeared on the front page of The Sunday Telegraph. When arresting officers appeared at the scene, Arrowsmith refused to walk downstairs and was carried down three flights of stairs.

On 10 September 1974, two days after Arrowsmith arrest, police raided 5 Caledonian Road, the Peace News offices, and the homes of several peace activists. The raids were in response to the British Withdrawal from Northern Ireland Campaign (BWNIC) and their 'Information for Discontented Soldiers' leafletting campaign which had led to Arrowsmith's arrest. 5 Caledonian Road was the mailing address for the campaign.

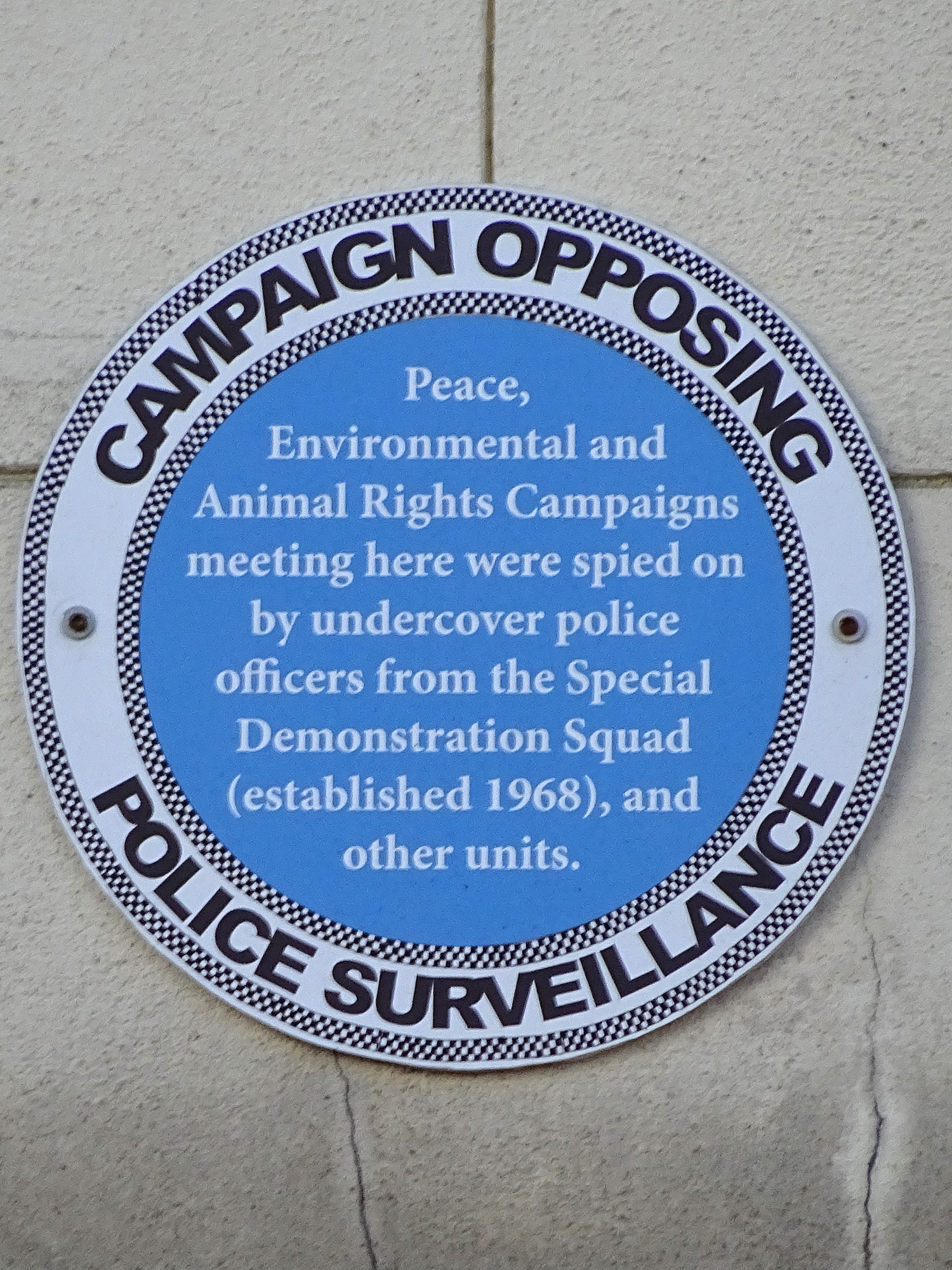
A plaque hanging at Housmans bookshop

=== Undercover surveillance ===
Housmans is one of many radical bookshops that have been a target of police surveillance and the attendance of officers who purchase material to monitor left-wing groups and individuals.

In the 2017, the Campaign Opposing Police Surveillance unveiled a plaque above Housmans as part of the grassroots Plaques Project. The project marked the known locations where campaigners and activists were spied on by officers from the Special Demonstration Squad and other undercover units. The plaque above Housmans reads, "Peace, Environmental and Animal Rights Campaigns meeting here were spied on by undercover police officers from the Special Demonstration Squad (established 1968), and other units"

==== Police spy Bob Lambert ====
Police officer Bob Lambert was head of the Special Demonstration Squad and posed as a left-wing animal rights activist named Bob Robison from 1983 to 1988. Lambert fathered a child with an activist, who was unaware of his true identity, during his deployment and regularly visited Housmans whilst undercover.

In 2013, it was reported that Lambert had co-authored the 'McLibel leaflet' while undercover with London Greenpeace which resulted in a ten-year defamation lawsuit from the McDonald's Corporation. Both London Greenpeace and the 'McLibel' defence campaign were based at 5 Caledonian Road.

==== Ian Kerr's blacklist ====
In 2009, private investigator Ian Kerr pleaded guilty to running an unlawful blacklisting service on building workers. Kerr visited Housmans and other radical bookshops to report on individuals and amassed thousands of files on trade unionists and political activists for his work at the Consulting Association. Kerr's blacklist was financed by more than 40 major firms in the construction industry. An investigation by The Guardian suggests that Kerr's investigations began in the 1970s for the Economic League, a right-wing organisation established in 1919. The Economic League had 45,000 files on people considered "extreme left-wing" and received payment from more than 2,000 companies to screen potential employees for trade unionists and "troublemakers."

== Alliance of Radical Booksellers ==
In 2011, Housmans cofounded the Alliance of Radical Booksellers. The Alliance created two awards:

=== Bread and Roses Award ===
The Bread and Roses Award for Radical Publishing was first awarded in 2012 and recognises the best radical books published each year.

=== Little Rebels Award ===
The Little Rebels Children's Book Award is a prize for radical fiction aimed at children aged 0–12 and was first awarded in 2013.

== Donated collections ==
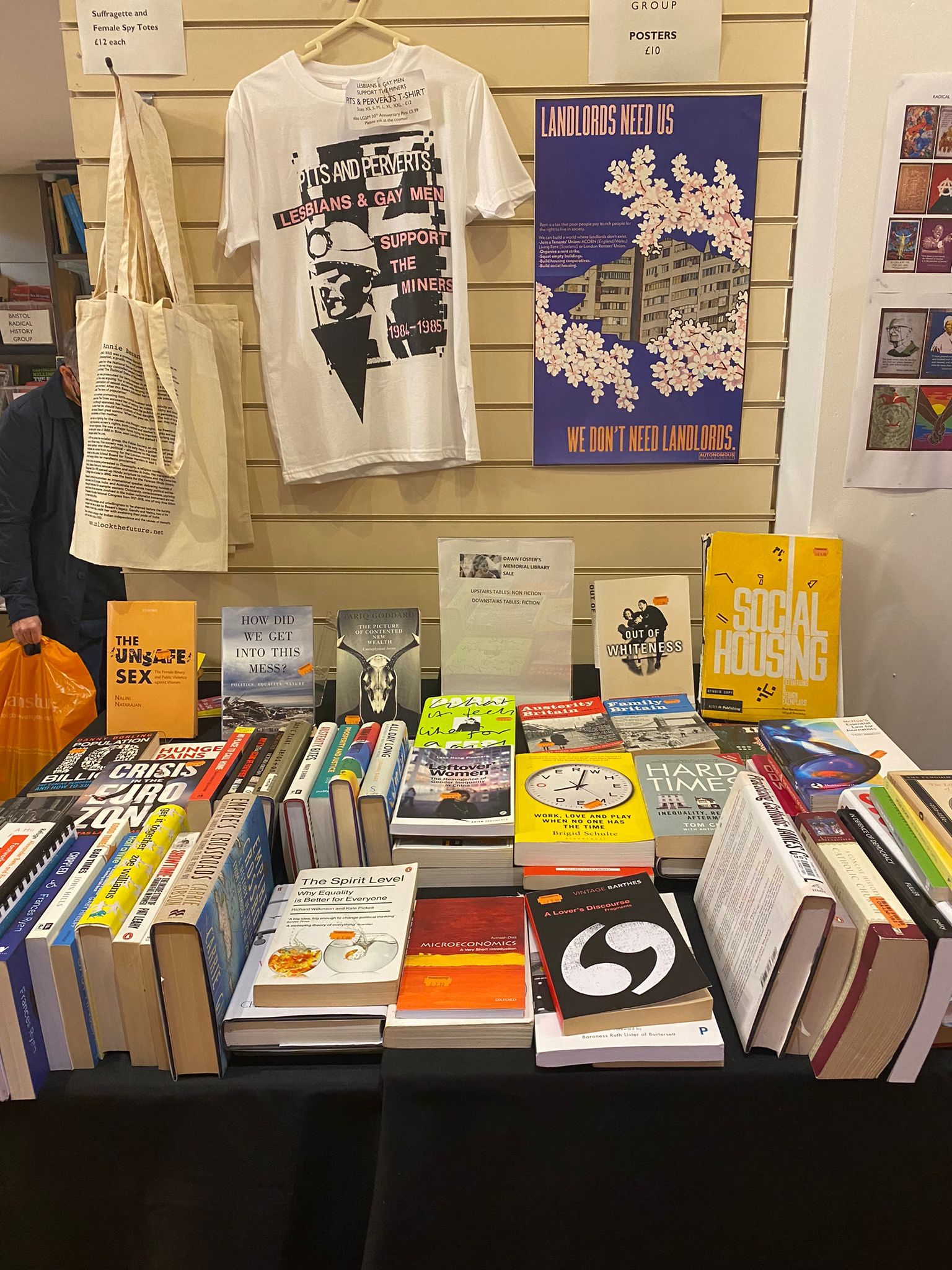
Sale of books belonging to the journalist Dawn Foster in 2021.

Book collections have been donated to Housmans from the estates of authors and activists including Doreen Massey, Mike Marqusse, and the educator Byron Criddle. Donations from living authors include Tariq Ali.

=== Professor Stuart Hall ===
In May 2016, Housmans sold the private library of cultural theorist Professor Stuart Hall. 3,000 books were donated to Housmans by Hall's widow Catherine Hall.

=== Dawn Foster ===
In October 2021, the private library of British journalist, Dawn Foster was donated by her next of kin. Each book was stamped with the imprint 'DAWN FOSTER FOREVER – From the library of Dawn Foster 1986-2021" and all titles were priced at £1, £3 and £5. The sale began 16 October 2021 and included fiction and political titles.

== Recent awards ==
- Winner of Best Independent Bookshop in London at the British Book Awards 2016
- Shortlisted for Independent Bookshop of the Year, British Book Industry Awards, 2016
- Shortlisted for Independent Bookshop of the Year, British Book Awards, 2020
- Housmans' director Cristina Ríos Harper awarded Bookshop Heroes Class of 2021
