= Thomas Wardle (pacifist) =

1950s British activist

Thomas Wardle (1923 – 1992) was a British-Australian pacifist who was active in the 1950s in the anti-apartheid, nonviolence and civil rights movements. He was also a leader in early anti-nuclear protests as a member of Operation Gandhi.

Wardle worked with Bayard Rustin, A. J. Muste, Henry LeRoy Finch and Michael Scott to promote non-violent protest against racial inequality, with views developed and honed during his time in South Africa in 1952 as an assistant to Manilal Gandhi on the newspaper, Indian Opinion.

== Career and peace activism ==
Born in Liverpool, Wardle served in the British Army from 1942 to 1947. He emigrated to South Africa to take up welfare work in 1948 and came to a full conversion to pacifism while working with Manilal Gandhi at the Phoenix settlement. Wardle returned to London in late 1952 working as a journalist on Peace News, a newspaper for the grassroots peace and justice movement. Active alongside Peace News editor Hugh Brock and fellow peace campaigner Michael Randle in Operation Gandhi, Wardle took part in the early anti-nuclear marches to Porton Down and the Atomic Energy Research Establishment at Hartwell. In an interview with the Imperial War Museum in 1992, Randle describes the impact Wardle had on him during the first hastily organised march to Aldermaston in 1952, discussing his absolute commitment to non-violence and his firm and articulate opposition to atomic energy for any purpose whatsoever. These marches proved to be the forerunners of the much larger Aldermaston Marches in 1958 and the Campaign for Nuclear Disarmament.

Profoundly influenced by Gandhism, Wardle was in demand to speak against apartheid and promoted nonviolence in many forums during the 1950s, both in the UK and internationally. He was accepted to deliver testimony before the United Nations Commission on the racial situation in South Africa in Geneva, 1953, where he presented with Rev Michael Scott. Wardle's full testimony is housed at the UN Archives. In 1955, he undertook a three-month Peace Education tour of the US, sponsored by the American Friends Service Committee. Speaking on topics such as ‘The Struggle in South Africa’ and ‘The Contemporary Revolution’, he was accompanied by Bayard Rustin in many of the speaking engagements. These engagements included the keynote address to the War Resisters League annual dinner alongside Rustin, A. J. Muste and Henry LeRoy Finch.

== Later years ==
In 1960, Wardle and his family emigrated to Australia where he continued to work actively in advocating humanitarianism and environmentalism. He became a secondary school teacher in Geelong and on retirement, a volunteer tutor of philosophy in Geelong until his death in 1992.

== Personal life ==
Wardle married his Dutch wife, Nanny (née Bijvoet) in 1947, and has two adult children Shanti (Wong) and Mark. Nanny died in Geelong in 2020.
