= Operation Gandhi =

British pacificist group (1952–54)

Operation Gandhi was a pacifist group in Britain that carried out the country’s first nonviolent direct action protests in 1952.

== History ==
In 1949 the pacifist Peace Pledge Union (PPU) responded to its relative inertia and to calls for more action by holding a conference on 5 November. This led to the establishment of seven “Commissions” to explore the best ways of moving forward. One of these was the Nonviolence Commission. Members of the commission took it upon themselves to explore the question of civil disobedience. Subsequently, at the beginning of 1952, many members of the commission dissatisfied with a lack of action formed a ginger group, not formally affiliated to the PPU, initially known as Operation Gandhi, and then as the Nonviolent Resistance Group.

The PPU had been interested in the teachings of Gandhi and the possibility of translating them into actions in the United Kingdom. Between 1936, when Peace News was founded, and 1957, it had almost 350 articles on related topics. However, within the PPU there was significant opposition to the concept of civil disobedience.

At the end of 1951 Hugh Brock, who subsequently became editor of Peace News, proposed the formation of Operation Gandhi, for which he had already drawn up a plan of action. Its activities began with a sit-down outside the War Office on 11 January 1952. Eleven protesters squatted in front of the War Office, having first notified the police. Following principles of nonviolence, the protesters did not resist arrest, and in court pleaded guilty to charges of obstructing the police.

There were other protests at Aldermaston, Mildenhall, Porton Down and the Atomic Energy Research Establishment at Harwell. The protest march to Aldermaston in 1952 involved just 35 people and paved the way for the much larger Aldermaston Marches begun by the Direct Action Committee against nuclear war in 1958 and continued by CND. Indeed, Operation Gandhi can be said to have paved the way for all subsequent nonviolent direct action in the UK, including protests against nuclear weapons by the Direct Action Committee, by the Committee of 100 and by others.

Operation Gandhi did not last long. It changed its name to the Nonviolent Resistance Group and, by 1954, had been re-absorbed into the PPU's Nonviolence Commission.
