= Humphrey Moore =

British Pacifist and founder of Peace News

Humphrey Sims Moore (17 April 1909 – 15 August 1995) was a British pacifist and journalist. He founded Peace News, the British pacifist magazine, in 1936.

== Life and career ==
Born on 17 April 1909 in Samoa, Moore's father was a teacher and a Quaker. The family returned to the United Kingdom shortly before the outbreak of World War I and settled in Birmingham. Motivated by their Quaker faith, both of his parents publicly advocated for peace, and his mother was active with the Independent Labour Party. Like his parents, Moore became active in pacifist activism and joined the No More War Movement. In the late 1920s and early 1930s he worked as a journalist in Burton and Sunderland during which time he embraced various socialist causes.

In 1932 Moore took a post as a journalist in Ealing, and a year later he became editor of the National Peace Council's publications. His experience working with this publication brought him into contact with a broader array of peace activists, including church's of different backgrounds and political and social groups. This experience inspired his idea for a new kind of pacifist publication, and provided him with the knowledge of who his potential readers would be. Working with a peace group in Wood Green, London, Moore and his wife, Kathleen (playing the role of business manager), launched Peace News with a free trial issue on 6 June 1936. With good distribution possible through Moore’s contacts through the National Peace Council, the new magazine rapidly attracted attention. Within six weeks, Dick Sheppard, founder of the Peace Pledge Union proposed to Moore that Peace News should become the PPU’s paper. Early contributors to this new organ of the PPU included Gandhi, George Lansbury, and cartoonist Arthur Wragg.

Sales of Peace News peaked at around 40,000 during the so-called Phoney War following the German invasion of Poland in September 1939 and before major land battles in Europe. In May 1940, in the face of demands in parliament for the banning of the paper, the printer and distributors stopped working with Peace News. However, together with the typographer Eric Gill, Hugh Brock and his brother Ashley, and many others, Moore continued to publish Peace News and arrange for distribution around the UK. At more or less the same time Moore faced a conscientious objectortribunal at which he was exempted from war service.

Humphrey Moore’s emphasis on Peace News having a single-minded anti-war policy was increasingly being challenged as the war went on. Others wanted greater emphasis on building a peaceful society once hostilities ended. In 1940 the PPU appointed John Middleton Murry to edit the paper, asking Moore to stay on as assistant editor. Moore eventually resigned in 1944 to join the News Chronicle. Later, he worked on newspapers in Birmingham .

Media offices
Preceded by New position	Editor of Peace News; 1934 – 1940	Succeeded by John Middleton Murry
