= Milan Rai =

British writer and anti-war activist

Milan Rai (born 1965) is a British writer and anti-war activist from Hastings. He was co-editor with anti-war artist Emily Johns of the magazine Peace News until autumn 2024.

== Political views ==
Rai first became politically active in the campaign against Pershing II and Ground Launched Cruise Missiles - nuclear weapons scheduled to be deployed in Western Europe in the late 1980s.

Along with fellow activist Maya Evans, he was arrested on 25 October 2005 next to the Cenotaph war memorial in London, for refusing to cease reading aloud the names of civilians by then killed in Iraq in the course of the Iraq war.

Rai was convicted under the Serious Organised Crime and Police Act 2005 (SOCPA) for organising an illegal demonstration in the vicinity of Parliament.

In December 2006, Rai and Evans lost an appeal against their convictions. For refusing to pay a fine of £350 (and £150 court costs), Rai was sent to Wandsworth prison in south London for 14 days on 23 August 2007. This was his fourth prison sentence. Previous prison sentences (14 days in Pentonville in 1995, seven days in Wormwood Scrubs in 1996, and 28 days in Lewes in 2005) were all imposed for similar protests.

Also taken into account in his 2007 sentencing was a further fine of £100, imposed for organising and participating in protests during the "No More Fallujahs" tent city demonstration in Parliament Square. Rai's fine for these offences was imposed in May 2007 - Maya Evans was his co-defendant. Evans is best known for being the first person to be convicted of participating in an unauthorized demonstration in the vicinity of Parliament under SOCPA. Rai was the first person to be convicted of organizing an unauthorized demonstration in the vicinity of Parliament. Evans and Rai were also, through their May 2007 convictions, the first people to be convicted in the same trial of organizing and participating in unauthorized demonstrations in the vicinity of Parliament - at different parts of the same two-day event.

Their appeal against their SOCPA convictions was heard before the European Court of Human Rights (as of February 2009).

As well as being a co-ordinator of anti-war group Justice Not Vengeance, Rai was co-editor with his partner and anti-war artist Emily Johns of the London-based monthly magazine Peace News. Their co-editorship ran from March 2007 to Autumn 2024. Rai was a Peace News seller while at public school, selling copies to peace activist and poet Stephen Hancock, later a co-editor of the magazine.

Rai's primary organizational affiliations have been with the British Ploughshares movement (1988–1993); ARROW (Active Resistance to the Roots of War; 1990–2003); the Campaign for Nuclear Disarmament (CND; 1992–1997); Voices in the Wilderness UK (1998–2003) and Justice Not Vengeance (2003–present).

The Ploughshares movement is an international campaign of direct citizen disarmament of nuclear and other military equipment. ARROW was a London-based affinity group which organized mass actions and carried out a wide variety of campaigns, including a weekly vigil (1991–2003) against the economic sanctions - and then the impending war - on Iraq. CND is Europe's largest peace organization, devoted to British unilateral nuclear disarmament. Voices in the Wilderness UK, which Rai founded in 1998, a British arm of Voices in the Wilderness in the US, began life as a campaign of direct action against the economic sanctions on Iraq - breaking unjust laws by carrying children's medicines and other critical civilian goods to Iraq without an export licence. It developed a research function, and became an important part of the British anti-war scene. Justice Not Vengeance, which Rai co-founded in the aftermath of the 2003 invasion of Iraq, is an anti-war campaigning group dealing with an array of issues around the "war on terror".

== Awards ==
Rai has been awarded the Frank Cousins Peace award from the Transport and General Workers' Union (shared, 1993), and the Peace Award of the Christian peace group Pax Christi (2007).

== Books ==
Rai has authored several books:

- Tactical Trident: The Rifkind Doctrine and the Third World, Drava Papers, 1992
- Chomsky's Politics, Verso, 1995
- War Plan Iraq: 10 Reasons Against War with Iraq (includes chapter by Noam Chomsky), Verso, 2002
- Regime Unchanged: Why the War on Iraq Changed Nothing, Pluto, 2003
- 7/7: The London Bombings, Islam and the Iraq War, Pluto, 2006

He has contributed to books including:

- Iraq: The Human Cost of History, edited by Tareq Y. Ismael & William W. Haddad, Pluto 2003
- Drawing Paradise on the Axis of Evil, Emily Johns, JNV Publications 2007

== See also ==
- List of peace activists
