= Thomas Wardle (disambiguation) =

Thomas Wardle (1912–1997) was an Australian businessman.

Thomas Wardle may also refer to:

- Thomas Alfred Wardle (1913–2005), Canadian politician
- Thomas Erskine Wardle (1877–1944), officer in the Royal Navy
- Thomas Wardle (industrialist) (1831–1909), English businessman
- Thomas Wardle (pacifist) (1923–1992), British pacifist
