= Peace News =

British pacifist magazine started in 1936

- Front cover of No.2125, 25 July 1980
- Editor: Albert Beale, Andrew Rigby, Glyn Carter and Marwan Darweish, Editorial Committee
- Categories: Pacifist magazine
- Frequency: Weekly until April 1974; then fortnightly until 1987; then monthly from 1989–2012; then bi-monthly from April 2014. Quarterly magazine from September 2026.
- First issue: 1936
- Company: Peace News Trustees Ltd
- Country: United Kingdom
- Based in: London, United Kingdom
- Language: English
- Website: www.peacenews.info

Peace News (PN) is a pacifist magazine first published on 6 June 1936 to serve the peace movement in the United Kingdom. From later in 1936 to April 1961 it was the official paper of the Peace Pledge Union (PPU), and from 1990 to 2004 was co-published with War Resisters' International. Publication of the magazine was suspended by staff without the organisation's authorisation in September 2024. After a hiatus, it began publication as a quarterly magazine in September 2026.

== History ==
=== Founding and early days ===
Peace News was begun by Humphrey Moore who was a Quaker and in 1933 had become editor of the National Peace Council's publications. Working with a peace group in Wood Green, London, Moore and his wife, Kathleen (playing the role of business manager), launched Peace News with a free trial issue in June 1936. With distribution through Moore’s contacts with the National Peace Council, the new magazine rapidly attracted attention. Within six weeks, Dick Sheppard, founder of the Peace Pledge Union, proposed to Moore that Peace News should become the PPU’s paper. Early contributors to this new organ of the PPU included Mohandas Gandhi, George Lansbury, and illustrator Arthur Wragg. Peace News also had a large number of women contributors, including Vera Brittain, Storm Jameson, Rose Macaulay, Ethel Mannin, Ruth Fry, Kathleen Lonsdale and Sybil Morrison.

Some contributors were so sympathetic to the grievances of Nazi Germany that one sceptical member found it difficult to distinguish between letters to Peace News and those in the newspaper of the British Union of Fascists. The historian Mark Gilbert has argued that "With the exception of Action, the journal of the British Union of Fascists, it is hard to think of another British newspaper which was so consistent an apologist for Nazi Germany as Peace News." However, Juliet Gardiner has noted that Peace News also urged the British government to give sanctuary to Jewish refugees from Nazism. The fact that some PN contributors were supporting appeasement and excusing Nazi actions caused PN contributor David Spreckley to express fears that "in their scramble for peace", they were gaining "some questionable allies".

Sales of Peace News peaked at around 40,000 during the so-called Phoney War between September 1939 and May 1940. In that month in the face of demands in Parliament for the banning of the paper, the printer and distributors stopped working with Peace News. However, with help from the typographer Eric Gill, Hugh Brock and many others, Moore continued to publish Peace News and arrange for distribution around the UK.

Humphrey Moore’s emphasis on Peace News having a single-minded anti-war policy was increasingly being challenged. Others wanted greater emphasis on building a peaceful society once hostilities ended. In 1940 the PPU asked Moore to step aside into the post of assistant editor (which post he held until 1944), and appointed John Middleton Murry as editor. By 1946 Murry had abandoned pacifism and resigned.

Hugh Brock took on the role of assistant editor of Peace News in 1946 and became editor in 1955, lasting until 1964. During his period of tenure the magazine separated from the PPU as it had widened its focus into areas not directly related to absolute pacifism. Peace News in the 1940s published material from American journalist Dwight Macdonald and Maurice Cranston (later to become a noted philosopher).

From the 1940s on, Peace News began to take a strongly critical line towards British rule in Kenya. The magazine also established links with African anti-colonial activists Kwame Nkrumah and Kenneth Kaunda, and "Peace News′ close involvement with the anti-apartheid struggle...led to the banning of the paper in South Africa in 1959". During the 1950s, Peace News contributors included such noted activists as André Trocmé, Martin Niemöller, Fenner Brockway, A. J. Muste, Richard B. Gregg, Alex Comfort, Donald Soper, Michael Scott, MPs Leslie Hale and Emrys Hughes, Muriel Lester, Wilfred Wellock, and Esmé Wynne-Tyson.

=== 1959 to 1969 ===
In 1959, a gift of £5,700 from Tom Willis enabled Peace News to buy 5 Caledonian Road, London, N1. This became its office and printing press and was also shared with Housmans Bookshop. It was at the Peace News office that the nuclear disarmament/peace symbol was adopted. Describing the British pacifist tradition in the 1950s, David Widgery wrote "at its most likeable it was the sombre decency of Peace News, then a vegetarian tabloid with a Quaker emphasis on active witness".

The magazine campaigned against nuclear weapons, often working with the Campaign for Nuclear Disarmament. During this period Brock brought to Peace News "a staff of writer-activists committed to developing Gandhian nonviolent action in the anti-militarist cause", including Pat Arrowsmith, Richard Boston, April Carter, Alan Lovell, Michael Randle, Adam Roberts and the American Gene Sharp. Brock's successor in 1964 was Theodore Roszak. In the same year, a Caribbean Quaker and PN writer, Marion Glean, "contributed to a series of statements by post-colonial activists on 'race' in the run-up to the 1964 election, published by Theodore Roszak, editor of Peace News." After the election, Glean helped bring together several activists, including David Pitt, C. L. R. James and Ranjana Ash to form the Campaign Against Racial Discrimination. Throughout the 1960s, Peace News covered issues such as opposition to the Vietnam War and the Biafran issue in the Nigerian Civil War. The magazine's coverage of the Vietnam War was notable for its support for the protests of the Vietnamese Buddhists, who it argued could become a nonviolent "Third Force" independent of both the Saigon and Hanoi governments. Peace News also ran lengthy analysis of left-wing thinkers, including E.P. Thompson's two-part study of C. Wright Mills and Theodore Roszak's assessment of Lewis Mumford.

=== 1970 to 2014 ===
In 1971 the company was re-structured with Peace News Ltd (PNL) newly created to separate the management of Peace News from that of Housmans Bookshop, while Peacenews Trustees Ltd (renamed Peace News Trustees Ltd in December 2025) continued to oversee both organisations, and in December 1971 the paper added to its masthead the words "for nonviolent revolution".

In April 1974, the paper switched from weekly to fortnightly production with a coloured cover and moved its main office to 8 Elm Avenue in Nottingham, where it remained until returning to London in 1990.

In 1978, one worker at Housmans was injured after a bomb was sent to the Peace News London office, (allegedly by the neo-Nazi organisation Column 88) as part of a series of attacks on left-wing organisations (similar attacks were made on the Socialist Workers Party and Anti-Nazi League offices before this occurred).

Peace News suspended publication at the end of 1987, intending to relaunch after a period of rethinking and planning. In May 1989 the paper resumed publication, but quickly ran into financial difficulties. In 1990 it became linked to War Resisters' International and was co-published as a monthly until 1999, then as a quarterly with a British-orientated Nonviolent Action published in the intervening months. Peace News came out strongly against the Iraq War in 2003 while at the same time condemning Saddam Hussein. In 2005, Peace News resumed monthly publication, as an independent British publication and in a tabloid format, before switching to regular bi-monthly publication in April 2014.

In June 2014, Peace News ran an article calling for a "Yes" vote in the Scottish independence referendum.

=== 2015–present ===
Peace News continued to be published in tabloid-size print media and as a website by Peace News Ltd until 2024, describing its editorial objectives in 2009 as: to support and connect nonviolent and anti-militarist movements; provide a forum for such movements to develop common perspectives; take up issues suitable for campaigning; promote nonviolent, antimilitarist and pacifist analyses and strategies; stimulate thinking about the revolutionary implications of nonviolence. It was edited by Milan Rai and Emily Johns. The publication was subsequently on hiatus. Peace News resumed publication in September 2026 as a quarterly magazine edited by Albert Beale, Andrew Rigby, Glyn Carter, and Marwan Darweish.

In 2012 Tony Benn described Peace News as "a paper that gives us hope...(it) should be widely read".

In the 2015 United Kingdom general election, Peace News endorsed voting Green as "the default position for folk who’re willing to vote at all – unless you’ve got a sitting left-wing Labour MP like John McDonnell.

In the 2019 United Kingdom general election, Peace News endorsed voting Green, Labour or Plaid Cymru.

In September 2024, it was announced by the resigning editors that Peace News magazine had been closed. This “closure” was due to a dispute between the Peace News Ltd staff and the Peace News Trustees Ltd board, that had ended with the resignation of the magazine's staff.

Peace News Trustees Ltd immediately denied that the announcement by the outgoing staff was actually a closure of the paper. The closure was not authorised by the organisation's directors. After a hiatus, Peace News resumed publication in September 2026 as a quarterly magazine. The trustees have removed from online the paper's entire final issue (No.2674-2675) as it was published without authorisation and using the organisation's resources and articles that explained why the staff and many of the former Board members resigned. Those articles can still, however, be found elsewhere.

The Peace News archives for 1937-1990 are held at the Commonweal Collection in the J.B. Priestley Library, University of Bradford.

== Campaigns, trials and stance ==
Peace News opposed the Iraq War and the War in Afghanistan and "seeks to oppose all forms of violence". It also opposes the UK's "retention and renewal of nuclear weapons in the shape of Trident". It states that it "draws on the traditions of pacifism, feminism, anarchism, socialism, human rights, animal rights and green politics – without dogma, but in the spirit of openness."

Peace News has been associated with initiating numerous campaigns, and a number of its staff members have been arrested for taking part in peace actions. In November 1957 Hugh Brock was one of three founders of the Direct Action Committee Against Nuclear War, which was run from the Peace News office and involved many Peace News staff. The DAC produced the first badges with the Nuclear Disarmament/Peace symbol, and organised various actions of civil disobedience against nuclear weapons and also the first of the Aldermaston Marches in Easter 1958.

In 1971 Peace News, together with War Resisters' International, initiated a nonviolent direct action project, Operation Omega, to challenge the Pakistani military blockade of then East Pakistan.

In the same year Peace News criticised the attempt to ban the sex education book The Little Red Schoolbook, and reprinted extensive extracts from the publication in the magazine.

In 1972 Peace News co-editor Howard Clark, after meeting activists from the Canadian Greenpeace boats, initiated the group that became London Greenpeace, at first campaigning against French nuclear tests.

In 1973 Peace News played a central role in launching the British Withdrawal from Northern Ireland Campaign (BWNIC) and in supporting the "BWNIC 14", fourteen activists, including a member of the Peace News collective, charged with "conspiracy to incite disaffection" via a leaflet "Some Information for Discontented Soldiers". After an 11-week trial, a jury acquitted the BWNIC 14 in 1975, although two members of Peace News collective were fined for helping two AWOL soldiers go to Sweden.

In 1974, together with Nicholas Albery of BIT Information Service, Peace News began publishing the Community Levy for Alternative Projects, an invitation to supply funds for, generally, fledgling alternative projects, partly targeting shops and businesses that identified with counter-cultural ideas and aspirations.

In August 1974, Peace News published a special edition revealing and printing in full Colonel David Stirling's plans to establish a strike-breaking "private army", "Great Britain 1975". By arrangement The Guardian led with this story on the day of publication, Peace News won the 1974 "Scoop of the Year" award from Granada Television.

In 1978, Peace News, together with The Leveller magazine, revealed the identity of Colonel B, a witness in the ABC trial. Peace News fought its conviction for "contempt of court" right up to appeal in the House of Lords, where the Lord Chief Justice's "guilty" verdict was finally overturned.

In 1995, Peace News and the Campaign Against Arms Trade were jointly sued for libel by the Covert & Operational Procurement Exhibition (COPEX) for repeating allegations that the exhibition was serving as a meeting place for buyers and sellers of torture implements. The High Court struck out the case when COPEX failed to show in court and the peace groups were awarded costs.

== Publications ==
The following is a partial list of Peace News publications.

=== 1940s ===
- How the War came by Philip Kerr, Marquess of Lothian, c. 1941.
- Muslims of India and the Muslim League. Howard Whitten, c. 1942.
- The Unknown Soldier by Harry Emerson Fosdick,(Reprint) 1943.
- The Economics of Peace by John Middleton Murry, 1943.
- Victory for Humanity. An American proposal for constructive peace by Albert Wentworth Palmer, 1943.
- Youth Registration and Education. A comment on first reports of the 1941 registration. Donald Tait and Marjorie Tait, 1943.
- Liberty in the War by Denis Hayes, 1943.
- Pacifists over the World by Harold F. Bing, 1943.
- Forced Labour in the Colonies by J.W. Cowling, 1943.
- Food Relief in the Second World War by Roy Walker, 1943.
- Citizens in Jail by Roger Page, 1943.
- Negotiation in Practice. Some facts about international communications in time of war by Humphrey S. Moore, 1943.
- Gandhi and the Viceroy. Extracts from the letters which led up to Gandhi's twenty-one day's fast in February, by Mohandas Gandhi (reprint) 1943.
- Big Powers and Little Powers: A Parable by Laurence Housman, 1944.
- "I work to outlaw war" by Henry Hilditch, 1944.
- Law Versus War by Vera Brittain, 1944.
- Non-Violence now by Roy Walker, 1944.
- Pacifism on the doorstep by Michael Lee, 1944.
- Versailles to Munich by John Scanlon, 1944.
- Science, wisdom and war by Alexander Wood, 1944.
- A Problem for the Gentiles: On Anti-Semitism by James Parkes, 1944.
- Laugh it off!: war-time buns from the gutter by "Owlglass" 1944.
- Are Pacifists Mistaken? by Patrick Figgis, 1945.
- Military Conscription After the War?
- The Indian problem by A.K. Jameson, 1945.
- Non-violence goes Latin by Devere Allen, 1946.
- Humbug for Hodge by John Middleton Murry, 1946.
- The Deeper Challenge of the Atom Bomb by Alexander Wood, 1946.
- Peace and Disobedience by Alex Comfort, 1946.
- The Police Idea by Stuart Denton Morris, 1946.
- America's great social problem by Sydney Dawson Bailey, 1947.
- Facts About Atomic Energy by Kathleen Lonsdale, 1947.
- India Gets Her Freedom by Samar Ranjan Sen, 1948.
- Pacifism and the free society : a reply to John Middleton Murry by Edgar Leonard Allen, 1948.
- Over to Pacifism by Garry Davis, 1949.
- The Right Thing to Do: Together with The Wrong Thing to Do by Alex Comfort, 1949.
- East and West by Heinz Kraschutzki, 1949.

=== 1950s ===
- Power or Peace : Western industrialism and World leadership, by Wilfred Wellock, 1950.
- Pacifism and the political struggle by Donald Port, 1950.
- The challenge of our times :annihilation or creative revolution? by Wilfred Wellock, 1951.
- Guns for the Germans? The arguments for and against German rearmament by Basil Davidson, 1951.
- Japan for Peace or War?:The Case Against Remilitarising Japan by Basil Davidson, 1951.
- Gandhi : the practical peace-builder by John S. Hoyland, 1952.
- Social responsibility in science and art by Alex Comfort, 1952.
- That which essentially belongs to man by Stuart Morris and Reginald Reynolds, 1952 (published with War Resisters International).
- Plain words on war by Sybil Morrison, 1952.
- Defence without arms : a psychologist examines non-violent resistance by Dorothy Glaiste, 1952.
- Far Eastern time fuse : the Japanese Peace Treaty: what it says and what it really means by the Union of Democratic Control and Peace Pledge Union; distributed by Peace News. 1952.
- Empire in crisis : a survey of conditions in the British colonies today by Fenner Brockway, 1953.
- Iron hand and wooden head: British Guiana; an indictment of Mr. Oliver Lyttelton by Emrys Hughes, 1953.
- Egypt: cross-road on a world highway by Hugh Joseph Schonfield, 1953.
- Neutrality: Germany's way to peace by Canon Stuart Morris, 1953.
- The Problem of Peace by Albert Schweitzer, 1954.
- The Camp of Liberation by Abraham John Muste 1954.
- The Third Camp by John Banks, 1954.
- Waging peace: The need for a change in British policy by Richard Acland, 1954.
- Security through disarmament by Sybil Morrison (1954)
- The "Peace News" story: Pioneering in pacifist journalism, with a practical guide for propagandists by Harry Mister (1954)
- Freedom for Cyprus by Christopher Lake, 1956.
- Truth About Kenya: An Eye-Witness Account by Eileen Fletcher, 1956.
- Nato : a critical examination of the North Atlantic treaty organisation by Roy Sherwood
- What is happening in Vietnam? by John Chinnery, 1956.
- Bechuanaland. What Seretse's exile means Edited by G. Sharp. Published with the Movement for Colonial Freedom, 1956.
- It Isn't True : some popular fallacies about pacifism and war by Stuart Morris and Sybil Morrison. Foreword by Vera Brittain, c. 1956.
- The Arm of the Law : the United Nations and the use of force by Canon Stuart Morris, 1957.
- Hazards of nuclear tests by Dr. Lionel Sharples Penrose, ( with the Medical Association for the Prevention of War) 1957.
- Unarmed. Some consequences of total disarmament. by Standing Joint Pacifist Committee, 1957.
- Bertrand Russell introduces Labour and the H-bomb by Emrys Hughes and Bertrand Russell, 1958.
- Tyranny could not quell them : how Norway's teachers defeated Quisling during the Nazi occupation and what it means for unarmed defence today by Gene Sharp, 1958.
- From Arrows to Atoms : a Catholic voice on the morality of war by Ciaran Mac an Fhaili, 1959.
- Towards a non-violent society : a study of some social implications of pacifism by J. Allen Skinner, 1959.

=== 1960s and 1970s ===
- 1 in 5 must know by James Cameron, c. 1960.
- Race Relations in Great Britain by Vernon Waughray, 1961.
- Some psychological aspects of disarmament by Hildegard Forres, 1961.
- The Truth about Polaris by Adam Robers, c. 1961.
- Direct action by April Carter, 1962.
- Political prisoners in Greece by Christopher Lake, 1962.
- Nuclear testing and the arms race by Adam Roberts, 1962.
- The Common Market : a challenge to unilateralists by April Carter, 1962.
- The Century of Total War by Hugh Brock, 1962.
- Nonviolent Resistance : men against war by Nicolas Walter, 1963.
- On the duty of civil disobedience by Henry David Thoreau, (Reprint: Introduced by Gene Sharp) 1963.
- Letter to a Hindu by Leo Tolstoy (Reprint), 1963.
- Civilian Defence by Adam Roberts (foreword by Alastair Buchan), 1964.
- The anatomy of foreign aid by Sidney Lens, 1965.
- To Keep the Peace; the United Nations peace force by Geoffrey Carnall, 1965.
- Peace is Milk: Peace News Poets by Adrian Mitchell, 1966.
- Vietnam, the political case for military withdrawal by Russell Johnson, 1967.
- Wichita Vortex Sutra: Peace News Poets by Allen Ginsberg, 1969.
- A Message to the Military Industrial Complex by Paul Goodman, 1969.
- Revolution and Violence by Mulford Q. Sibley, 1969.
- On War, National Liberation, and the State by Nigel Young, 1971.
- The Buddhists in Vietnam: Reality and Response by Laura Hassler, 1972.
- War Games by Nigel Gray and Ken Sprague, 1974.
- Making Nonviolent Revolution by Howard Clark, 1977 (1st edition), 1981 (2nd edition), 2012 (3rd edition).
- Taking Racism Personally: white anti-racism at the crossroads, by Keith Motherson et al., 1978.

=== 1980s to present day ===
- From Protest to Resistance: the direct action movement against nuclear weapons edited by Ross Bradshaw, Dennis Gould and Chris Jones, 1981.
- The Anti-Nuclear Songbook by Anonymous, illustrated by Pat Gregory, 1982.
- It'll Make a Man of You: A feminist view of the arms race, Penny Strange, 1983, co-published with Mushroom Bookshop.
- Preparing for Nonviolent Direct Action by Howard Clark, Sheryl Crown, Angela McKee and Hugh MacPherson, 1984 (a joint publication of Peace News and CND).
- Too Much Pressure: Cartoons by "Brick", edited and designed by Kathy Challis, 1986.
- Against All War: Fifty Years of Peace News, 1936-1986 by Albert Beale, 1986.
- How Britain was sold : why the US bases came to Britain by Andy Thomas and Ben Lowe, 1987.
- Children Don't Start Wars by David Gribble, 2010.
- Toward a Living Revolution: A five-stage framework for creating radical social change by George Lakey, 2012.
- The March that Shook Blair: An Oral History of 15 February 2003 by Ian Sinclair, 2013.
- The Hammer Blow: How 10 Women Disarmed A Warplane by Andrea Needham, 2016.

== Editors ==
#	Name	Term	Notes
1	Humphrey Moore	1936–40	
2	John Middleton Murry	1940–46	
3	Frank Lea	1946–49	
4	Bernard Boothroyd	1949–51	
5	J. Allen Skinner	1951–55	
6	Hugh Brock	1955–64	
7	Theodore Roszak	1964–65	
8	Rod Prince	1965–67	
9	Editorial committee	1967-1990	All editorial staff jointly lead the paper.
10	Ken Simons	1990–95	
11	Tim Wallis	1995–97	
12	Chris Booth and Stephen Hancock	1997–2000	Joint editors.
13	Ippy Dee	2000–07	
14	Milan Rai and Emily Johns	2007–2024	Joint editors.
15	Albert Beale, Andrew Rigby, Glyn Carter and Marwan Darweish	September 2026-	Editorial Committee
