= J. Allen Skinner =

British pacifist and trade unionist

James Allen Skinner (16 January 1890 – 20 January 1974) was a British pacifist and trade unionist.

Born in Dulwich, Skinner began working for the Post Office, firstly delivering telegraphs, then as a postman, and as a sorter. He became active in the Independent Labour Party (ILP), probably under the influence of his wife, Phillis Emerson, who also convinced him to become a vegetarian and free thinker.

Skinner opposed World War I as a socialist and a pacifist. He was a conscientious objector, but also refused to take up alternative employment, and so was imprisoned in Wormwood Scrubs in 1916. The prison authorities refused to provide vegetarian food, so Skinner suffered greatly from hunger. Although he was released three months later, he again refused military service, and was imprisoned a second time. While imprisoned, he contracted tuberculosis, which left him with a permanent disability affecting his knee and elbow.

In 1919, Skinner found work with the Union of Post Office Workers (UPW), and relocated to Manchester in 1920 as the union moved its head office there. He soon became assistant editor of the union's journal, The Post, and wrote numerous articles for it. He moved back to London a few years later, continuing to work for the union, but became increasingly prominent in the ILP. He stood as the Labour Party candidate for Hendon at the 1924 United Kingdom general election, and for Clapham in 1929, and also served as secretary of the ILP's London and Southern Counties division. He supported the ILP's disaffiliation from the Labour Party in 1931 and remained active in the smaller party.

During World War II, Skinner served as an adviser to the Central Board for Conscientious Objectors, and after the war, he was secretary of the No Conscription Council and chair of the board of Peace News. He retired from the UPW in 1950, and devoted more time to Peace News, including a period as editor from 1952 to 1955. During this period, he worked closely with A. J. Muste and the two were leading members of the "Third Way Movement". He was also involved in anti-nuclear campaigning, becoming a sponsor of the Emergency Committee for Direct Action against Nuclear War and was active in the Direct Action Committee. For demonstrating at a rocket base in Harrington, he was sentenced to two months in prison, spending his seventieth birthday there.

Party political offices
Preceded by John Scurr	London Division representative on the National Administrative Council of the Independent Labour Party; 1929–1933	Succeeded by Jack Gaster
Media offices
Preceded by Bernard Boothroyd	Editor of Peace News; 1952–1955	Succeeded by Hugh Brock
