= Maya Evans =

Labour Councillor

- Born: Hackney, London, England
- Education
- Political party: Current: Hastings Independents Previously: Labour Party England
- Movement: Peace movement and human rights
- Awards: Peter Duffy Award 2007
- Website: http://www.vcnv.org.uk/

Maya Evans is a British politician and activist. She is a councillor on Hastings Borough Council representing Hollington ward in East Sussex. She is currently cabinet member for Environment and was described as the "climate change champion" in 2019.

Evans was arrested in October 2005 near the Cenotaph war memorial in London, after refusing to stop reading aloud the names of British soldiers who had been killed in Iraq following the 2003 Iraq war. She became the first person to be convicted under the Serious Organised Crime and Police Act 2005 for taking part in an unauthorised demonstration within 1 km of Parliament Square. She received a conditional discharge and a fine. In December 2006, she lost an appeal against the convictions.

Evans is one of the main campaigners in the group 'Voices for Creative Non-Violence UK' focusing on the ongoing conflict in Afghanistan. She has been on speaking tours in the UK in 2006, 2007 and 2012, her letters appear regularly in The Guardian and The Independent, and until 2011 she had a regular column in the monthly Peace News. On 10 December 2007, Human Rights Day, Evans was awarded the Peter Duffy Award by the pressure group Liberty "for her campaigning work and commitment to the cause of liberty" and "courage in standing up for our fundamental rights to peaceful protest and freedom of speech".

She is a member of the International Organization for a Participatory Society.

== Afghanistan and legal challenges ==
In June 2009, Evans sought a judicial review of the detainee transfer policy applying to Afghans captured by British soldiers, following claims they were subject to torture, including by beating and electrocution, after being handed to Afghan authorities such as the National Directorate of Security (NDS). The hearing, in April 2010, included evidence from the Royal Military Police, and was partly held in secret, with much of the evidence not available to Evans's lawyers. The judges described their ruling, on 25 June 2010, as a "partial victory" for Evans, concluding that there was "a real risk that detainees transferred to NDS Kabul will be subjected to torture or serious mistreatment" and transfers would "therefore be in breach of the Secretary of State's policy and unlawful", but transfers to other NDS facilities (Kandahar and Lashkar Gah) could continue provided specified conditions were met, such as the right of British monitors to get access to the detainees regularly. After the ruling, the United Nations Assistance Mission in Afghanistan "found compelling evidence that NDS officials at five facilities systematically tortured detainees", including at least one facility, at Kandahar, that had been pronounced safe for detainee transfers by the High Court.

In 2010, Evans called for a judicial review over alleged civilian killings by British forces in Afghanistan. On 12 May 2011, she won a separate action against cuts to legal aid for judicial review cases that were brought in the general public interest, submitting that the motive behind the cuts was to avoid government accountability rather than to save money. Lord Justice Laws and Mr Justice Stadlen found that the government had not properly revealed the "true reasons" behind their proposed amendments to legal aid, and that the consultation process had been "legally defective". The ruling against the cuts was hailed as "a significant victory for the rule of law."

In December 2011, Evans joined Voices for Creative Nonviolence on the first British peace delegation to Afghanistan, visiting a refugee camp to deliver aid raised by other British peace activists. She visited Kabul again at Christmas 2012 as a guest of Afghan peace makers.

== See also ==
- List of peace activists
