= Column 88 =

British neo-Nazi paramilitary organisation

Column 88 was a neo-Nazi paramilitary organisation based in the United Kingdom. It was formed in the early 1970s, and disbanded in the early 1980s. The members of Column 88 undertook military training under the supervision of a former Royal Marine Commando, and also held regular gatherings attended by neo-Nazis from all over Europe. The name is code: the eighth letter of the alphabet 'HH' represents the Nazi greeting 'Heil Hitler'. Journalist Martin Walker described Column 88 as a "shadow paramilitary Nazi group".

== Formation ==
A secret Nazi underground group, the origins of Column 88 have been given as early as 1945. Indeed, Gerry Gable has claimed that Colin Jordan was sworn in as a member of this secret society as a nineteen-year-old. According to historian Richard Thurlow, Column 88 took their name from a group of Austrians who set up an underground group of this name in 1934 when the Austrian government banned the Nazi Party.

Open activity, however, did not start until 1970 when it took charge of elements of the National Socialist Group, a secret paramilitary grouping associated with the British Movement. The founders of this more organised group had been followers of Colin Jordan, who had become disillusioned with their former leader after he began to moderate his public utterances in the wake of the 1965 and 1968 Race Relations Acts. One of their major critiques of Jordan was his decision two years earlier to disband the National Socialist Movement in order to establish the British Movement, an action which they interpreted as a retreat from Nazism.

According to one report, "Column 88, was connected with the Gladio networks. These networks were set up after the Second World War, with the support of the US Central Intelligence Agency, by a number of powers, both within and outside NATO as anti-communist resistance bodies".

== Leadership ==
The group's military commander was Major Ian Souter Clarence, who had served in the Black Watch during the Second World War before becoming active as a supporter of Arnold Leese. Stories about him stockpiling weapons had been known to MI5 from as early as 1946. He organised a number of camps to provide combat training to Column 88 members. One such camp, held in November 1975 in conjunction with the League of St George, was reported in the well known UK anti-fascist Searchlight magazine where those in attendance included Brian Baldwin, a prison officer from Manchester, and Peter Marriner, the head of the British Movement in Birmingham.

The overall leader however was Leslie Eric Lutz Vaughan, a veteran of the British National Party and its paramilitary wing Spearhead. Vaughan was, according to Ray Hill, close to Anthony Reed Herbert in a professional capacity (Herbert being a lawyer and Vaughan a private investigator) and the work Vaughan put Herbert's way ensured that Column 88 played a leading role in Herbert's British Democratic Party. Indeed, following a World in Action report in 1981 detailing British Democratic Party attempts at gun-running, Vaughan and Column 88 temporarily went into abeyance for fear of becoming implicated. Other leading members included Joe Short, who had been involved in David Myatt's National Democratic Freedom Movement, Graham Gillmore, a mercenary and NF member, and David Myatt.

== Activities ==
Members of other more open far-right movements were recruited into Column 88's ranks, with membership limited to those seen as the most extreme. Indeed, A.K. Chesterton, who had established the National Front, wrote in one of his final letters to John Tyndall expressing his concerns that NF members were becoming involved in Column 88.

In the late 1970s, the organisation allegedly carried out several bomb attacks on left-wing British organisations, including the Socialist Workers Party, the Anti-Nazi League and the left-wing Housmans bookshop, where the pacifist and anti-racist magazine Peace News was published. Many suspected that this group were behind the arson attack that destroyed the Albany Empire in Deptford, south London in July 1978 during the Rock Against Racism campaign. Other bomb attacks that it was reported to have carried out included those against targets as diverse as the homes of Conservative Party members and transmission towers whilst the group also claimed a series of arson attacks on Jewish-owned businesses.

Column 88 first came to public attention in 1975, when the regional British newspaper, the Western Daily Press, published accounts of Column 88 members training, in Savernake Forest, Wiltshire, with elements of the Territorial Army. This led to a question being asked, by a Member of Parliament, in the House of Commons, and to other reports in British newspapers, such as The Guardian. The British anti-fascist magazine, Searchlight, also published articles about Column 88 in May 1975, and May 1976.

Infiltration of the Army Cadet Force was also organised by Column 88. Column 88 was also said to have been involved in the establishment of a number of other far-right groups, including the exclusive League of St. George and the National Party. National Party leader John Kingsley Read claimed that he received funds from Column 88 both for his own party and during his time as chairman of the National Front. In 1983 Column 88 hit the headlines again when the press reported that Clarence had been "safe-housing" three German neo-Nazis terrorists Odfried Hepp, Ulrich Tillmann and Walter Kexel, who were wanted for bomb attacks on US Army bases in Germany.
