= Another Europe Is Possible =

European Union reform political campaigning group

Another Europe is Possible
- Formation: 2016; 10 years ago
- Founded at: London, United Kingdom.
- Type: Advocacy group
- Purpose: Political campaigning concerning the UK's relationship with the EU
- Region served: United Kingdom

Another Europe is Possible is a civil society organisation based in the United Kingdom which was founded in February 2016 to campaign for the 'Remain' option during the 2016 United Kingdom European Union membership referendum (often referred to as the 'Brexit referendum'), while also advocating for internal reform of the EU. The group describes itself as advocating a "Remain position in the EU referendum from a specifically left, progressive perspective" and came together to work "across party political lines to campaign for democracy, human rights, and social justice". It states that the EU requires "radical and far-reaching reform, breaking with austerity economics and pioneering a radically new development strategy". The group gained attention as a high-profile protest organising platform during the 2019 British prorogation controversy.

== Aims and principles ==
The organisation is critical of aspects of the EU, such as austerity, TTIP, deregulation and neoliberal politics. However, it advocates for UK membership of the European Union, for reasons such as to fight for environmental protection, a maximum working week and holiday pay. New Europeans interprets the group as stressing that the EU is "in dire need of reform" but that it "remains the best place to fight global issues". Another Europe Is Possible states in its founding statement that "the EU is in desperate need of a democratic overhaul" and that it argues for "far-reaching democratic reforms of European institutions". Writing for Novara Media, Josiah Mortimer summarised the group's goal as "a progressive EU (with the UK in it)."

The organisation's 2018 constitution highlights support for freedom of movement, legal protections for the environment and workers, and solidarity with migrants and refugees. Their constitution also claims that the group will "fight against" racism, border controls, and right wing nationalism.

As with similar campaigns, Another Europe is Possible's support for a second referendum concerning the UK's relationship with the EU, has been criticised as undemocratic.

== Organisation ==
Another Europe is Possible exists as a not-for-profit organisation and is a limited company, incorporated on 5 May 2016. According to its filings with Companies House in 2019, the organisation employed 8 people. The organisation is additionally supported by volunteers. In its application to register as a company, it stated its address as Housmans Bookshop, in London, England. Housmans is notable as a long-standing radical bookshop and meeting place for left-wing intelligentsia in London.

=== Governance ===
Another Europe Is Possible is governed by an elected national committee and representatives of affiliated organisations.

=== Connections to other political groups ===
Another Europe Is Possible has received support from the Labour pressure group Momentum, several senior members of Momentum, such as former Momentum steering group member Michael Chessum, have also been highly involved in the organisation. The group is also connected to the Labour Campaign for Free Movement. The organisation's relationship to the Labour Party was highlighted in The Clarion. Democracy in Europe Movement 2025 (DiEM25) has close links to the organisation as well and has frequently collaborated with it in the past. In 2016, Greek politician Yanis Varoufakis published an open letter expressing his hope that members of Another Europe Is Possible would join DiEM25, his pan-European progressive platform. Reflecting the fact that views concerning the United Kingdom's relationship with the European Union, and the nature of the EU more broadly, vary both between and within different strains of political thought, Another Europe Is Possible has been both supported and criticised by progressive and conservative organisations.

Senior members of Another Europe Is Possible are also linked to Global Justice Now, European Alternatives, and Open Labour. The group has received support from leading figures within the Green Party of England and Wales, including Caroline Lucas and Amelia Womack. Another Europe Is Possible has also been involved in joint campaigns with The 3 Million, a migrant rights advocacy group. The group has also been connected to the Stop Trump Coalition, a protest group which was highly critical of President of the United States Donald Trump's 2018 visit to the United Kingdom.

The Morning Star published an editorial holding responsible "groups like Another Europe Is Possible" for Labour's defeat in the 2019 United Kingdom general election. This criticism centers on the idea that the Labour party would have received greater support had it adopted an explicitly pro-Brexit stance. Similarly, in an article for New Statesman, journalist Anoosh Chakelian suggested that Another Europe Is Possible, along with similar group For our Future's Sake, received negative attention for offering criticisms of Jeremy Corbyn's ambiguous approach to Brexit. Chakelian wrote that "regardless of how they feel about Brexit. Corbyn represents the socially liberal values they endorse, and they would prefer to see a purely anti-hard Brexit, anti-Tory approach."

=== Financial support and funding ===
In addition to donations and membership fees, Another Europe is Possible has been financially supported by organisations such as Best for Britain, Joseph Rowntree Reform Trust, and European Cultural Foundation.

== History ==
=== Founding ===
Another Europe Is Possible was formed in February 2016, shortly before the campaign on the UK's EU membership referendum, which took place on 23 June 2016. The official campaign launch occurred in London on 10 February 2016. A founding statement was published in The Guardian on 18 February 2016, outlining what the group described as ‘the progressive case of staying in the EU’, by ‘staying in the EU independently of Cameron and big business, opposing any part of a “renegotiation” that attacks workers’, migrants’ or human rights’. On 28 May 2016, the organisation hosted a campaign event, taking place at the UCL Institute of Education in London. Greek politician Yanis Varoufakis, British Labour politician John McDonnell, and Green Party of England and Wales politician Caroline Lucas were amongst the highest-profile speakers.

=== Since the 2016 referendum result ===
Following the referendum result to leave the EU, the group broadened its campaign aims, being active on issues such as freedom of movement, voting rights and the anti-Trump movement, while continuing to make the case for a more progressive European Union. The organisation opened for membership in 2018 and set up a National Committee with a mix of directly elected members, representatives of affiliate organisations and members co-opted in a non-voting capacity. At this time, Another Europe Is Possible become vocally pro-Remain, arguing for a second referendum. A nationwide UK tour took place to oppose the Brexit Deal as being negotiated by then Prime Minister Theresa May.

The organisation's strategy was adopted by the first members' conference on 8 December 2018 and a written constitution was published afterwards. From December 2018 and throughout 2019, the organisation campaigned to stop Brexit, for a second referendum, and to continue freedom of movement. In 2019, the organisation developed anti-Brexit motions to be sent to the Labour Party's September conference.

The group played a central organising role in the 'Stop the Coup' protests during the 2019 British prorogation controversy.

Since the United Kingdom's withdrawal from the European Union on 31 January 2020, the organisation has continued to campaign concerning its desire for a close relationship between Europe and the United Kingdom.
