= Howard Clark (pacifist) =

British pacifist and Chair of War Resisters International (2006 – 2013)

Howard Clark (6 March 1950 – 28 November 2013) was an active pacifist who was Chair of War Resisters' International (WRI) from 2006 until his sudden death from a heart attack. As well as having played an important role in the WRI from the 1980s, he had been an active contributor to the British pacifist magazine, Peace News.

Howard Clark was born in Bath into a devout Methodist family and his father was a minister. He attended Kingswood School. He became a pacifist around the time he went to the University of East Anglia in 1968, where he met, and eventually married the daughter of a World War II conscientious objector. At university he was a member of the British National Council of the Fellowship of Reconciliation. On graduation he was offered a position as co-editor of Peace News, a job he held until 1976. In this time he helped to launch several campaigns and organisations including London Greenpeace, the British Withdrawal from Northern Ireland Campaign, and the Campaign Against the Arms Trade.

In 1976 Clark left Peace News and moved to York, where he became a member of the editorial collective of York Free Press, an alternative newspaper. He became an active campaigner against nuclear power, undertaking a solo cycle tour round all the UK nuclear power sites. In 1980 he moved to Bradford where he studied and worked as assistant to Michael Randle on the Alternative Defence Commission that produced the report, Defence without the Bomb. During this period he also helped write the 1983 Peace News/Campaign for Nuclear Disarmament publication Preparing for nonviolent direct action. In 1985 he joined the WRI London office.

In the early 1990s he travelled regularly to the Balkans to support the anti-war groups that had formed there. He became impressed with the civil resistance movement in Kosovo, which led to the publication of several works, such as Civil Resistance in Kosovo. In 1997 he became an Honorary Research Fellow of the Albert Einstein Institution in Cambridge, Massachusetts, founded by Gene Sharp. In the same year he resigned from his staff position with WRI but continued to be active with Peace News and the WRI executive. In 2006 he was elected Chair of WRI, and started teaching a postgraduate programme at a university in Spain. The following year he launched the website Civilresistance.info. In 2013 Howard Clark was awarded a PhD from Coventry University in recognition of his research and publications on Kosovo.

He was a large, energetic man who suffered from nystagmus, otherwise known as "dancing eyes".

== See also ==
- List of peace activists
