= Incitement to Disaffection Act 1934 =

Act of the Parliament of the United Kingdom

Incitement to Disaffection Act 1934 (Note: Section 4(1).)
- Act of Parliament
- Parliament of the United Kingdom
- Long title: An Act to make better provision for the prevention and punishment of endeavours to seduce members of His Majesty's forces from their duty or allegiance.
- Citation: 24 & 25 Geo. 5. c. 56
- Territorial extent: United Kingdom (Note: Section 4(2) and (3).)

Dates
- Royal assent: 16 November 1934
- Commencement: 16 November 1934 (Note: The Acts of Parliament (Commencement) Act 1793.)
Other legislation
Amended by	Sheriff Courts (Scotland) Act 1971; Criminal Justice Act 1972; Police (Northern Ireland) Act 1998; Serious Organised Crime and Police Act 2005; Courts Reform (Scotland) Act 2014 (Consequential Provisions and Modifications) Order 2015

Status: Amended

Text of statute as originally enacted

Revised text of statute as amended

Text of the Incitement to Disaffection Act 1934 as in force today (including any amendments) within the United Kingdom, from legislation.gov.uk.

The Incitement to Disaffection Act 1934 (24 & 25 Geo. 5. c. 56) is an act of the Parliament of the United Kingdom that made it an offence to endeavour to seduce a member of HM Forces from his "duty or allegiance to His Majesty", thus expanding the ambit of the law.

The previous relevant legislation was the Incitement to Mutiny Act 1797 (37 Geo. 3. c. 70), which created the offence of endeavouring to seduce a member of HM Forces from his duty and allegiance. The 1797 act, last significantly used against Tom Mann, 1912, and in the Campbell cases, 1924 and 1925, was not repealed by the 1934 act, but effectively became defunct.

In 1974, the peace campaigner Pat Arrowsmith was convicted of offences against sections 1 and 2 of the act, and sentenced to eighteen months in prison, for having handed out leaflets at a British Army base, urging the soldiers to refuse to serve in Northern Ireland. In 1975, the Court of Appeal dismissed her appeal of her conviction, describing her conduct as "mischievous" and "wicked"; however, it upheld her appeal against the sentence, reducing it such that she would be immediately released. Arrowsmith filed a case against the United Kingdom (Arrowsmith v United Kingdom) with the European Commission of Human Rights, claiming that her conviction violated the European Convention on Human Rights' protections of her rights to liberty, freedom of belief, and freedom of expression. In 1978, the Commission found that her conviction was "a necessary restriction on the exercise of free speech in the interests of national security and for the prevention of disorder", and as such did not violate the convention.

According to Geoffrey Robertson, a human rights lawyer, the most powerful incitement to disaffection was made in the 1987 election campaign by the Prime Minister, Margaret Thatcher, who declared that armed forces chiefs should consider resigning in protest if the Labour Party were elected and sought to implement its non-nuclear policy.
