= Aldermaston Marches =

Anti-nuclear weapons demonstrations

The Aldermaston marches were anti-nuclear weapons demonstrations in the 1950s and 1960s, taking place on Easter weekend between the Atomic Weapons Research Establishment at Aldermaston in Berkshire, England, and London, over a distance of fifty-two miles, or roughly 83 km. At their height in the early 1960s they attracted tens of thousands of people and were the highlight of the Campaign for Nuclear Disarmament (CND) calendar. Similar demonstrations also took place around the world.

The first major Aldermaston march at Easter (4–7 April), 1958, was organised by the Direct Action Committee Against Nuclear War (DAC) and supported by the recently formed CND. Several thousand people marched for four days from Trafalgar Square, London, to the Atomic Weapons Establishment to demonstrate their opposition to nuclear weapons. Hugh Brock, one of the organisers, records that he was one of thirty-five people to have marched to Aldermaston six years before in 1952 as part of Operation Gandhi.

From 1959 an annual Easter march from Aldermaston to London was organised by CND. By reversing the direction from the march they distinguished their campaign, directed at the seat of power, from the DAC's direct action campaign, directed at local nuclear bases. Reversing the direction also meant that as the march got closer and closer to London, making it easier for people to join in, each day the number of participants swelled.

On the 1963 Aldermaston march, a group calling itself Spies for Peace distributed leaflets as the march passed a secret government establishment, RSG 6. A large group, led by Peter Cadogan (an activist in the direct-action Committee of 100), left the march, against the wishes of the CND leadership, to demonstrate at RSG 6. Later, after the march reached London and an estimated 100,000 filled Trafalgar Square, there were disorderly demonstrations in which anarchists were prominent.

At Easter 1964 there was only a one-day march in London, partly because of the events of 1963 and partly because the logistics of the march, which, grown beyond all expectation, had exhausted the organisers. In 1965 there was a two-day march from High Wycombe. In 1972 and 2004 there were revivals of the Aldermaston march in the original direction, although by 1972, only about 600 marchers took part.

== Participants ==
The Aldermaston March Committee for the first march comprised April Carter, Hugh Brock, Pat Arrowsmith and Michael Randle from DAC; Frank Allaun MP and Walter Wolfgang from the Labour H-Bomb Campaign; and, Bayard Rustin from the War Resisters League (WRL). They appointed Michael Howard as Chief Marshall. The committee was assisted by nonviolent theorist Gene Sharp, though he never became a member of the committee itself.

- Peggy Duff organised subsequent Aldermaston Marches 1959–1963.
- Sidney Hinkes was involved in the first Aldermaston March,
- Walter Wolfgang participated in the first Aldermaston March and led a revival of the march in 1972.
- Reg Freeson was one of five Labour MPs on the first Aldermaston March.
- Lindsay Anderson made the documentary March to Aldermaston (1958).
- Eric Idle was a keen supporter of the Campaign for Nuclear Disarmament and participated in the Aldermaston March.
- Rod Stewart took part in the Aldermaston Marches as a teenager.
- Michael Rosen attended the marches on his own aged 13.
- Actress Eileen Way and her husband, the psychiatrist Felix Warden Brown, took part in the Aldermaston Marches.

== Songs ==
Music was a significant part of the march, at first symbolising the difference in attitude between the CND leaders, who wanted to march in silence, and the youth on the march led by Pat Carty, the first "Youth" Secretary for the CND, who wanted to sing and play guitars. John Brunner's song, The H-bomb's Thunder became the unofficial anthem of CND, . Songs associated with CND and the Aldermaston march were released on an EP record, Songs from Aldermaston (1960) and an LP, Songs Against the Bomb (Topic 12001) released at about the same time. It contained: "Brother Won't you Join the Line?" (McColl and Keir, 1958); "The Crooked Cross" (McColl and Seeger, 1960); "Strontium 90" (Dallas, 1959); "Hey, Little Man" (Dallas, 1959); "Doomsday Blues" (Dallas, 1958); "The Ballad of the Five Fingers" (McColl, 1959); "There are Better Things to Do" (Seeger, 1958); "The H-Bomb's Thunder" (Brunner, 1958); "Song of Hiroshima" (Kinoshita); "Hoist the Window" (trad. arr. Hasted, 1952); "That Bomb Has Got to Go" (McColl and Seeger, 1959); "The Dove" (trad. arr. Rosselson); and "The Family of Man" (Dallas, 1957). A new arrangement of H-bomb's Thunder was issued on a CD, Songs To Change The World (Peaksoft PEA012) in 2011.

Ewan MacColl's English text of Song of Hiroshima was sung on the Aldermaston Marches by the London Youth Choir. An unofficial peace version of the national anthem of the United Kingdom was written in 1958 by Henry Young for the first Aldermaston March and is taken from Young's collection of poems From Talk to Action: The fight for peace.

The marches inspired work from a number of other musicians, notably Matt McGinn's "On the Road to Aldermaston".

== See also ==
- Ostermarsch (a similar movement in Germany)
