= Arthur Wragg =

British illustrator

Arthur Wragg Designed Dust Jacket for A Venture of Faith

Arthur Wragg (3 January 1903 – 17 August 1976) was a British illustrator.

== Early life ==
He was born in Eccles, Greater Manchester, and grew up in Harrogate, Yorkshire, along with his sister Amy Wragg, born 1898. He was the son of George Arthur Wragg (a travelling salesman for Lively Polly) from Sheffield, Yorkshire, and Alice Smethurst Eckersley (a telegraphist) from Salford, Lancashire (a member of the Williamson family of Salford). He trained at Sheffield School of Art before settling in London as a freelance commercial artist.

== Career ==
In the 1920s he contributed mostly to women's magazines, but later branched out into book-jackets and work for left-wing newspapers such as Tribune and Peace News (including cartoons) and illustrations for books and pamphlets about Christian socialism, pacifism and social justice.

Wragg illustrated biblical texts in a politicised way, notably The Psalms for Modern Life (Selwyn & Blount 1933) which went through several reprints. The simplified block-style and dramatic chiaroscuro effects of these illustrations make them resemble woodcuts rather than pen and ink drawings (misleading some collectors into thinking the books were reissues of hand-printed original editions). His work reflected affinities with the visual-symbolic language of propaganda art, although Wragg's agenda was more generalised. He blended social realities and symbols to convey deprivation, justice, conscience, and the persistence of spiritual values in the alienated urban-industrial environment.

A friend and follower of pacifist preacher Canon Dick Sheppard, Wragg became a sponsor of the Peace Pledge Union and was a conscientious objector during World War II. After imprisonment, he became an art-teacher in schools, returning to freelance work after the war. His personal style became more airy and more fantastical, and sometimes surreal.

From 1953 until his death he produced illustrations for record covers for Argo record company.

No catalogue of his work exists, but a biography Arthur Wragg: Twentieth-century Prophet and Jester (Sansom 2001) was published by the late Judith Brook, one of his students.

He featured as the 'Artist of Note' in the long-running magazine The Artist (Vol XI No 5, July 1936).

== Themes ==
His stark poster-like artwork often dealt with themes of social alienation and spiritual emptiness. All his work was done for publication, rather than in 'fine art' media such as paintings or print series. As a result, he is neglected in comparison with contemporaries such as Graham Sutherland and John Piper. Wragg's choice of medium was an ideological one. He was a socialist and pacifist and wanted his art to speak directly to common people rather than to art-lovers. His vivid, polemical style had considerable influence on other popular forms in the 1940s and 1950s, such as government information posters and advertising.

== Partial list of books ==
- The Psalms for Modern Life (Selwyn & Blount 1933)
- Jesus Wept (Selwyn & Blount 1935)
- Holt - When I was a Prisoner (Miles 1935)
- Darling, William - Down But Not Out (George Allen & Unwin 1935)
- Szekely - Cosmos, Man and Society (Daniel 1936)
- Younghusband, Francis (1937). A Venture of Faith. London: Michael Joseph, Ltd.
- Walter Greenwood - The Cleft Stick (Selwyn & Blount 1937)
- Thy Kingdom Come (Selwyn & Blount 1939)
- Seven Words (Heinemann 1939)
- Alice through the paper-mill: In Respectful Criticism of the Paper Control and Kindred Matters relating to the Present State of the Trade. A Plea for an Equitable System of Planning whereby to ensure a Measure of Efficiency and a Degree of Order for All Concerned.
- The Lord's Prayer in Black and White (Cape 1946)
- Wilde - The Ballad of Reading Gaol (Castle Press 1948)
- Purcell - These thy Gods (Longman 1949)
- The Song of Songs (Selwyn & Blount 1952)
- Flaubert, G. "Bibliomania" (Rodale, 1954)
- Willis - Whatever Happened to Tom Mix (Cassell 1970)

== Obituary ==
- Hobbs, John. The Times, 25 August 1976,
