= Peter Cadogan =

- Born: Peter William Cadogan; January 26, 1921; Whitley Bay, Northumberland, United Kingdom of Great Britain and Ireland
- Died: November 18, 2007 (aged 86); London, United Kingdom
- Education: Kings Priory School; King's College
- Occupation: Teacher
- Employer: University of London
- Organization: South Place Ethical Society
- Known for: Platforming fascists; Platforming paedophiles; Indirect responsibility for death of Kevin Gately; Police informant
- Notable work: Early Radical Newcastle
- Style: Militant chic
- Political party: Communist Party of Great Britain; Labour; Socialist Labour League
- Movement: Socialism
- Board member of: Gandhi Foundation
- Spouse: Joyce Stones
- Children: Claire Phillips

Peter Cadogan (26 January 1921 – 18 November 2007) was an English writer and political activist.

== Life ==
Cadogan was born in Whitley Bay on 26 January 1921. He attended The King's School, Tynemouth during the 1930s, before studying history at King's College, Durham. Cadogan first gained employment with an insurance company. In 1941, he joined the Royal Air Force Air Sea Rescue and served until 1946. On his demobilisation, he became a member of the Communist Party of Great Britain. He became a teacher in Northampton and Cambridge following his 1949 marriage to Joyce Stones, the daughter of Labour MP William Stones.

When Cadogan was ousted from the Communist Party in 1956, he became a member of the Labour Party. Whilst in Labour, Cadogan was part of the first Socialist Labour League (SLL) conference in 1959. After being removed from the Labour Party and SLL that year, Cadogan became an editor for a Trotskyist magazine called International Socialism in 1960. He also wrote for Socialist Worker.

He was national secretary of the anti-nuclear Committee of 100 in the 1960s. He became an advocate of the breakaway state of Biafra during the Nigerian civil war, starting the Save Biafra Campaign in 1968.

Cadogan was chairman of the South Place Ethical Society from 1970 to 1981. He took the controversial decision, purportedly on the grounds of freedom of speech, to permit both the Paedophile Information Exchange and National Front (NF) to meet at the society's premises. The latter decision faced heavy criticism, including from the local Labour MP Lena Jeger. Following opposition to the NF in Red Lion Square, which had resulted in violent disorder and the death of Kevin Gately, the Anarchist Black Cross criticised the South Place Ethical Society’s superannuated mode of governance, which had given Cadogan unchecked control of Conway Hall, while accusing Cadogan himself of being a police informant, of broader collaboration with the NF, and of being a charlatan who had obtained his position for financial gain rather than a commitment to humanism. During Lord Scarman’s inquiry into the events leading to Gately’s death Cadogan blamed Liberation and the International Marxist Group for the disorder, whilst praising the violent police conduct toward anti-fascist protestors. Following the Battle of Red Lion Square Cadogan forced trustees of the South Place Ethical Society to agree to continue hosting the NF at Conway Hall, only later passing on information about the far-right group to the Attorney General.

He taught the history of ideas in the extramural department of the University of London (later part of Birkbeck College) between 1981 and 1983.

Cadogan was a long-standing member of the Blake Society and served as both its chairman and president.

He wrote a book on direct democracy in 1974 and many pamphlets and articles. He was a founder of New Consensus/New Dialogue in 1990, co-founder of Values and Vision, 1991, and chairman of the London Alliance for Local Democracy from 1998.
