= Committee of 100 (United Kingdom) =

Former British anti-war activism group

- Formation: 22 October 1960; 65 years ago
- Dissolved: 31 October 1968; 57 years ago
- Type: Civil society campaign
- Region served: United Kingdom
- Services: Nuclear disarmament
- Methods: Nonviolent direct action Civil disobedience
- Fields: Anti-nuclear movement Peace movement Anarchist movement
- Affiliations: Direct Action Committee; Campaign for Nuclear Disarmament

The Committee of 100 was a British anti-war group. It was set up in 1960 with a hundred public signatories by Bertrand Russell, Ralph Schoenman, Michael Scott, and others. Its supporters used mass nonviolent resistance and civil disobedience to achieve their aims. After the parliamentary strategy of the leadership of the Campaign for Nuclear Disarmament suffered reverses, the committee became, historian Martin Shaw argues, the driving force of the mass movement against nuclear weapons in 1961-63.

== History ==
The idea of a mass civil disobedience campaign against nuclear weapons emerged early in 1960 in discussions between Ralph Schoenman (an activist in the Campaign for Nuclear Disarmament (CND)), and Hugh Brock, April Carter (both of the Direct Action Committee against nuclear war), Ralph Miliband, Alan Lovell and Stuart Hall. Schoenman approached Bertrand Russell, the president of CND, with the idea. Russell resigned from the presidency of CND in order to form the Committee of 100, which was launched at a meeting in London on 22 October 1960 with a hundred signatures. Russell was elected as president and Michael Randle of the Direct Action Committee was appointed secretary.

Russell explained his reasons for setting up the Committee of 100 in an article in the New Statesman in February 1961:

The Campaign for Nuclear Disarmament has done and is doing valuable and very successful work to make known the facts, but the press is becoming used to its doings and beginning to doubt their news value. It has therefore seemed to some of us necessary to supplement its campaign by such actions as the press is sure to report. There is another, and perhaps more important reason for the practice of civil disobedience in this time of utmost peril. There is a very widespread feeling that however bad their policies may be, there is nothing that private people can do about it. This is a complete mistake. If all those who disapprove of government policy were to join massive demonstrations of civil disobedience they could render government folly impossible and compel the so-called statesmen to acquiesce in measures that would make human survival possible. Such a vast movement, inspired by outraged public opinion is possible, perhaps it is imminent. If you join it you will be doing something important to preserve your family, compatriots and the world.

Many in the Campaign for Nuclear Disarmament, including some of its founders, supported the Committee of 100's campaign of civil disobedience and in its first year it received more in donations than CND had received in its first year. Several of the early CND's activists, including some members of its executive committee, had been supporters of the Direct Action Committee and in 1958 CND had cautiously accepted direct action as a possible method of campaigning; but, largely under the influence of Canon John Collins, the CND chairman, the CND leadership opposed any sort of unlawful protest, and the Committee of 100 was created as a separate organisation partly for that reason and partly because of personal animosity between Collins and Russell. It has been suggested that this separation weakened the campaign against nuclear weapons.

The committee's campaign tactic was to organise sit-down demonstrations, which were not to be undertaken without at least 2,000 volunteers pledging to take part. Many eminent people participated in the sit-downs but few of the 100 signatories took part in the committee's activities. Demonstrators were required to adopt a discipline of non-violence. In a briefing document the Committee of 100 said, "We ask you not to shout slogans and to avoid provocation of any sort. The demonstrations must be carried out in a quiet, orderly way. Although we want massive support for these demonstrations, we ask you to come only if you are willing to accept this non-violent discipline." Demonstrators were recommended to remain limp if arrested and to refuse to co-operate in any way until inside the police station.

At first, the Committee of 100 differed from CND only in its methods, and they had the same objectives. Within the committee, however, there were different ideas about civil disobedience, direct action and non-violence. Bertrand Russell saw mass civil disobedience merely as a way of getting publicity for the unilateralist cause. Those from the Direct Action Committee were absolute pacifists (some of them Christians) who followed Gandhi, and they regarded direct action as a way of creating a non-violent society. Ralph Schoenman and others, including the anarchists who later led the organisation, saw direct action as a sort of insurrection that could force the state to give up nuclear weapons. These factions argued among themselves about whether non-violence was a matter of principle or just a tactic and whether the Committee should limit itself to demonstrations or adopt a more thoroughgoing anarchist programme. Nicolas Walter, a prominent member of the Committee, said later that it had been an anarchist organisation from its inception and that the hundred signatories were, in effect, a front.

=== February to September 1961 ===
The committee's first act of civil disobedience on 18 February 1961 was a sit-down demonstration at the Ministry of Defence in Whitehall, London, to coincide with the expected arrival of USS Proteus on the River Clyde. (Picture) Between 1,000 and 6,000 people took part. Somewhat to the surprise of the Committee, there were no arrests. At the next sit-down demonstration, on 29 April in Parliament Square, the police arrested 826 people. There were also marches and sit-downs against nuclear testing and demonstrations at the US and Soviet embassies in London and at the Polaris submarine base.

On 17 September, Battle of Britain Day, supporters blocked the pierheads at Holy Loch and the approaches to Trafalgar Square. (Picture) The September demonstration is regarded as the high-water mark of the Committee of 100. A week before the demonstration, the hundred committee members were summoned to court without charge under the Justices of the Peace Act 1361 because they "incited members of the public to commit breaches of the peace" and were likely to continue to do so. The court bound them to a promise of good behaviour for twelve months; thirty-two, including Bertrand Russell, then aged 89, refused and chose to go to prison instead. It is estimated that 12,000 to 15,000 attended the demonstration despite the invocation of the Public Order Act 1936, which effectively made it illegal to be in the vicinity of central London that day. Several thousand sat down and there were 1,314 arrests, but no violence from demonstrators despite allegations of police brutality.

=== December 1961 ===
The success of the September demonstration encouraged the committee to move from symbolic sit-down demonstrations in London to mass direct action at the places where nuclear weapons would be deployed, and they planned simultaneous demonstrations on 9 December to walk on to air force bases at Wethersfield, Ruislip, Brize Norton, Cardiff to sit on the runways and to prevent planes from taking off, and street sit-downs in Bristol, Manchester and York. By this time the authorities had begun to take the Committee of 100 more seriously. The official response had escalated from prosecution for incitement to breach of the peace to prosecution for the much more serious offences of conspiracy and incitement to breach the Official Secrets Act 1911.

To that end Special Branch raided the committee's offices at 13 Goodwin Street in Finsbury Park before the protests, seizing material and charging and arresting six of its young, leading but lesser-known organisers, the "Wethersfield Six" - Bertrand Russell said that he was equally responsible, but the authorities refused to arrest him too. The six were Ian Dixon, Terry Chandler, Trevor Hatton, Michael Randle, Pat Pottle and Helen Allegranza - in February the following year all were sentenced to eighteen months' imprisonment except Allegranza, who received twelve months. (Picture)

3,000 military and civilian police were mobilised at Wethersfield. 5,000 demonstrated between there and bases at Brize Norton and Ruislip, and city centre protests in Cardiff, York, Manchester and Bristol, some ~850 were arrested across all locations. It was regarded by many as a failure and it was the committee's last act of large-scale civil disobedience. There were recriminations within the committee, one internal memorandum saying that its policies had turned it into "a public spectacle, a group isolated from the general body of public opinion and feeling." Herbert Read resigned from the committee, saying that the action was "strategically foolish". The committee was weakened by the imprisonment of its officers.

The force used by the police at sit-down demonstrations surprised many of the demonstrators, which, with the committee's insistence on nonviolence and the use of pre-emptive arrests for conspiracy, discouraged many, and support dwindled. The committee's plan to "fill the jails" by means of mass civil disobedience, and thus compel the government to respond to their demands, was frustrated by the authorities imprisoning a few important members and ignoring the rest. The harsh sentences on the Wethersfield Six "brought home to the Committee its inadequacy when faced with the might of the State," and some of the committee's leaders were not willing to "fill the jails", mounting strenuous appeals against conviction or, in the case of Pat Pottle, going on the run.

=== 1962–1968 ===
By 1962, half of the original 100 signatories had resigned and had been replaced. The committee was in debt and had to face the failure of its mass civil-disobedience campaign. It was dissolved and the campaign was decentralized, thirteen regional committees, each with a hundred members, becoming responsible for organizing demonstrations, with a co-ordinating national committee. Of the regional committees, the London Committee of 100 was the most active and influential. A national magazine was launched by the London Committee in April 1963, published under the name Resistance from January 1964. Like CND, the Committee of 100 had begun with a self-appointed and unelected leadership, and, like CND, it faced pressure for greater participation by supporters. This re-organisation was intended to involve more people in decision making and to spread demonstrations throughout the country and had been anticipated in the creation of a number of subgroups in December 1961. Although Bertrand Russell opposed it, he wrote that "The Committee has found that its support, named and on file, is so extensive that regional committees are required to accommodate this strength," But supporters became exhausted by the number of demonstrations they attended and "neither London nor the regional committees had their full complement of a hundred."

In March 1962 Russell addressed a sit-down demonstration in Parliament Square against the sentences on the Wethersfield Six. All the 1,172 protesters were arrested, but there was a growing feeling that such demonstrations were becoming an end in themselves and would not now create a mass movement against nuclear weapons. (Contemporary research showed that public support for the unilateralist cause actually declined in the period when the Committee of 100 was most active.) A sit-down of 7,000 outside the Air Ministry planned for the following September had to be called off because of lack of support, a "public assembly" being held instead.

To underline its opposition to Russian nuclear weapons as well as those of the West, the committee held a demonstration in Red Square, Moscow, at an international congress of the World Peace Council in the summer of 1962 calling for the abolition of all nuclear weapons and attacking the Soviet system.

From 1962 onwards, the committee became increasingly radical and extended its campaigns to issues other than nuclear weapons. Peter Cadogan, an officer of the committee, said it was "trying to go in 12 directions at once", including campaigning for civil liberties in Greece, against Harold Wilson's failure to produce a promised Vietnam peace initiative and against siting London's third airport at Stansted. Diana Shelley, a member of the London Committee of 100, said that as the Committee adopted objectives other than nuclear disarmament it became "less non-violent". In 1963 Russell resigned, though he remained in sympathy with the early aims and activities of the committee and was careful not to denigrate it publicly. Following his departure, the public image of the Committee deteriorated, many signatories also resigned and "the Committee of 100 ventured even further into the wilderness of libertarian politics".

Members of the committee were responsible for the Spies for Peace revelations in 1963 about the regional seats of government, a network of secret government bunkers, and later for the escape of George Blake from Wormwood Scrubs Prison.

The committee's interest in Greek politics was sparked by the banning of a march by the Greek "Bertrand Russell Committee of 100" in Easter 1963, by the expulsion of some of the British Committee of 100's members when they attempted to join the march, and by the murder of Grigoris Lambrakis, a Greek MP and peace activist. Plans to protest against the London visit by King Paul and Queen Frederika in July 1963 were met by official attempts to prevent the demonstrations and draconian prison sentences on demonstrators. The government was criticized in the press for the severity of its treatment of the demonstrators and eventually there were embarrassing climb-downs. Some of the sentences were overturned on appeal and the Home Secretary, Henry Brooke, had to offer financial compensation. One of the demonstrators, Donald Rooum, proved that an offensive weapon had been planted on him and forced a public inquiry that criticized the police and led to the eventual imprisonment of three officers. But a nine-months sentence on Terry Chandler, secretary of the London Committee, was upheld on appeal. Diana Shelley said that the imprisonment of Chandler, "the force which had driven" the Committee throughout the summer, had a profoundly damaging effect. Four years after these events, following the 1967 military coup in Greece, a "non-violent invasion" of the Greek embassy resulted in prison sentences of up to fifteen months for Committee of 100 demonstrators.

The Committee of 100 was wound up in October 1968.

== Name ==
According to Christopher Driver, the name was suggested by Gustav Metzger and Ralph Schoenman, who derived it from the Guelph Council of 100.

== Legacy ==
Before the Committee of 100 came on the scene, civil disobedience on this scale was virtually unknown in Britain, although the researches of its advocates uncovered it as a strand of protest throughout the centuries. The Committee of 100, and comparable movements outside the UK (not least the Civil Rights Movement in the United States), made it a common method of social action, now familiar in environmental, animal rights and peace protests. However, non-violence, a strict principle of the committee, is rare. The committee also popularized a new method of organization derived from anarchism and hitherto unfamiliar to those in traditional political parties: without formal membership and based on decentralization and autonomous, self-selected "working groups" rather than elected executive committees.

== Original signatories ==
- Lindsay Anderson
- Clare Annesley
- John Arden
- Margaretta Arden
- Pat Arrowsmith
- Ernest Bader
- John Berger
- Eric Boothby
- Jack Bowles
- Lord Boyd Orr FRS
- John Braine
- Doug Brewood Jnr
- Oliver Brown
- Wendy Butlin
- Jane Buxton
- April Carter
- George Clark
- Major CV Clarke
- Una Collins
- Alex Comfort
- John Crallan
- Elizabeth Dales
- J Alun David
- Shelagh Delaney
- Francis Deutsch
- Reuben Fior
- Hilda Fitter
- John Fletcher
- Harold Foster
- William Gaskill
- Dorothy Glaister
- Janet Goodricke
- Michael Gotch
- David Graham
- Bob Gregory
- Mary Grigg
- Robin Hall
- Nicholas Harding
- Laurie Hislam
- David Hoggett
- John Hoyland
- Martin Hyman
- Alex Jacobs
- Augustus John OM
- Nicholas Johnson
- Bill Kaye
- Anne Kerr
- Dr Fergus King
- Rev RE Kirby
- Michael Lesser
- Ed Lewis
- Isobel Lindsay
- Christopher Logue
- Alan Longman
- Alan Lovell
- David Lumsdaine
- Hugh MacDiarmid
- Pat McConnell
- George Melly
- Gustav Metzger
- Bernard R Miles
- Dr Jack Mongar
- Dr John Morris
- Roland Muirhead
- John Neville
- John Nicholls
- Mike Nolan
- Pat O'Connell
- F O'Hanion
- John Osborne
- Colin Painter
- John Papworth
- Adam Parker Rhodes
- Dr John Paulett
- Malcolm Pittock
- Joan Pittock
- Inez Randall
- Herbert Read
- Heather Richardson
- Mary Ringsleben
- Ernest Rodker
- EGP Rowe
- Edith Russell
- Ralph Schoenman
- Michael Scott
- Ivan Seruya
- Teddy Seruya
- Peter Digby Smith
- RW Smith
- Tony Smythe
- Robin Swingler
- Chris Warbis
- Zebedee Winzer
- Will Warren
- Barbara Webb
- Dr W Weinberg
- Arnold Wesker
- Alan White
- Shifley Wood
- Biddy Youngday
- Alastair Yule

Many of the original signatories were later replaced. The list did not include its president, Bertrand Russell, the original officers, Helen Allegranza, Terry Chandler, Ian Dixon, Trevor Hatton, Pat Pottle and Michael Randle, or the later officers, Brian McGee, Jon Tinker, Peter Moule, William Hetherington or Peter Cadogan.

== See also ==
- Anti-nuclear movement in the United Kingdom
- Committee of 100 (Finland)
- Anti-war
- Direct Action Committee
- List of anti-war organizations
- List of peace activists
- Peace movement
