= Michael Randle =

English peace campaigner (born 1933)

- Born: 1933 (age 92–93); England
- Education: University of London (BA); University of Bradford (MPhil, PhD)
- Spouse: Anne Randle (m. 1962)
- Children: 2

Michael Randle (born 1933) is an English peace campaigner and researcher known for his involvement in nonviolent direct action in Britain and also for his role in helping the Soviet spy George Blake escape from a British prison.

== Early life ==
Born in England, Randle spent World War II with relatives in Ireland. He became active in the peace movement since registering as a conscientious objector to military service in 1951. He earned a bachelor's degree in English from the University of London (1966), a M.Phil. in peace studies from the University of Bradford 1981 and a Ph.D. in peace studies in 1994, also from the University of Bradford.

== Career ==
Randle was a member of the Aldermaston March committee which organised the first Aldermaston March against British nuclear weapons at Easter 1958.

He was chairman of the Direct Action Committee Against Nuclear War from 1958 to 1961, secretary of the Committee of 100 from 1960 to 1961 and a council and executive member of War Resisters' International from 1960 to 1987.

In 1959 and 1960, he spent a year in Ghana, participating in the Sahara Protest Team against French atomic bomb tests in the Algerian Sahara and helping to organise a pan-African conference in Accra which took place in April 1960. In 1962, he was sentenced, along with five other members of the Committee of 100, to 18 months' imprisonment for his part in organising nonviolent direct action at a USAF Wethersfield in Essex; it was while he was serving that sentence that his first son, Sean, was born. In October 1967, he was sentenced to 12 months' imprisonment for participating in an occupation of the Greek Embassy in London following the Colonels' coup in April that year.

=== George Blake escape ===
During his time in Wormwood Scrubs prison in 1962 and 1963, Randle became friends with George Blake, the British MI6 agent sentenced in 1961 to 42 years imprisonment for passing information to the Soviet Union. His outrage at the sentence imposed on Blake led him and two others, Pat Pottle and Sean Bourke, to assist Blake to escape from prison in October 1966.

Blake then stayed at "safe" houses around London, which were mostly friends of Randle and Pottle. The two wrote that they got Blake out of the area, first to Dover, hidden in a camper van, and then to a checkpoint in East Germany. Randle's children were sitting on the seat above Blake's hiding place to put off any customs officers who might look into the van. From there, Blake was able to get to the Soviet Union.

The admission of their involvement in the escape came in 1989, after the publication of a book about Blake by Montgomery Hyde (George Blake, Superspy; ISBN 0708839924). Pottle and Randle subsequently published a book admitting their involvement, titled The Blake Escape. Pottle later made this comment: "We didn't want needlessly to invite prosecution, but there were stories naming others who weren't involved, accusing us of being communist agents, trying to discredit the anti-nuclear campaign".

They were subsequently arrested, and in June 1991, Randle and Pottle stood trial at the Old Bailey for their part in the escape. They defended themselves in court, arguing that, while they in no way condoned Blake's espionage activities for either side, they were right to help him because the 42 year sentence that was imposed was inhuman and hypocritical. According to Randle, the judge disallowed their defence on the grounds that neither Blake's life nor mental stability was under immediate threat. He passed over the submission of the defendants that though the threat to Blake's well-being was not imminent it would inevitably have occurred unless they had seized the opportunity to help free him before prison security was tightened.

Despite the judge's ruling, the jury acquitted them on all counts - an act known as jury nullification in which a jury uses its absolute discretion to find as it sees fit. Randle later told an interviewer that "there are some circumstances in which it is right to break the letter of the law, a point acknowledged by the legal defence of necessity." Bourke was never charged since he lived in the Republic of Ireland.

=== Activism ===
Randle has a long history of anti-violence, having registered as a conscientious objector to military service in 1951 and joining Operation Gandhi (Non Violent Resistance Group) in 1952. According to the University of Bradford, he was "chairman of the Direct Action Committee Against Nuclear War, 1958-1961; secretary of the Committee of 100, 1960-1961; and a council and executive member of War Resisters’ International, 1960-1987" and has a PhD in Peace Studies (Bradford, 1994).

In 1956, he walked from Vienna to Hungary, hoping to reach Budapest to support Hungarian passive resistance to the Soviet occupation; he was not allowed to enter Hungary. According to a Jisc article, "In 1968, he jointly co-ordinated for War Resisters' International protests in Moscow, Budapest, Sofia and Warsaw against the Soviet-led invasion of Czechoslovakia. In the 1970s and 1980s, he collaborated with the Czech dissident Jan Kavan, then living in London, smuggling literature and equipment to the democratic opposition in Czechoslovakia."

From 1980 to 1987, he was coordinator of the Alternative Defence Commission, contributing to its publications, Defence Without the Bomb (Taylor and Francis, 1983) and The Politics of Alternative Defence (Paladin 1987). He has contributed articles and reviews to Peace News, New Society, The Guardian and other newspapers and journals. He is also the author of several books including The Blake Escape: How we Freed George Blake - and Why and Alternatives in European Security.

From 1988 to 1990, he was coordinator of the Bradford-based Social Defence Project and later coordinated the Nonviolent Action Research Project, also based in Bradford, the proceedings of which were edited into a book Challenge to Nonviolence. He remains an honorary visiting research fellow at the Department of Peace Studies, Bradford University. In 2005, with April Carter and Howard Clark, he co-edited People Power and Protest since 1945: a bibliography on nonviolent action.

In March 2003, Randle made an extended appearance on the television discussion programme After Dark, alongside Lord Hannay, Alice Nutter, Ruth Wedgwood, Ken O'Keefe and others.

Randle served as the minutes secretary and bulletin editor of the Committee for Conflict Transformation Support from 1992 to 2009. He is a long-serving trustee of the Commonweal Collection at the J.B. Priestley Library at Bradford University. As of 2018, he was the Chair of the Commonweal Trustees, a group that "supports ordinary people who work for a nonviolent world".

== Personal life ==
He married his wife, Anne, in 1962. They have two sons.

== See also ==
- List of peace activists
