= April Carter =

British academic (born 1937)

- Born: 22 November 1937; Gloucestershire, UK
- Died: 16 August 2022 (aged 84); Letchworth Garden City, Hertfordshire, UK

April Flore Carter (22 November 1937 – 16 August 2022) was a British peace activist.

== Biography ==
Carter was born on 22 November 1937 in Gloucestershire. Active in the nuclear disarmament movement in Britain in the late 1950s and early 1960s, Carter become Secretary of the Direct Action Committee Against Nuclear War in May 1958 (just after it had organised the first Aldermaston March), and was involved in early civil disobedience at nuclear missile bases. In 1961 she was European coordinator for the San Francisco to Moscow March organised by the US Committee for Nonviolent Action, and 1961–62 was an assistant editor at the international pacifist weekly Peace News. During the revived nuclear disarmament movement of the 1980s she was a member of the Alternative Defence Commission, which published an analysis of non-nuclear defence options for Britain in Defence Without the Bomb (Taylor and Francis, 1983).

From 1976 to 1984, Carter was a tutor and fellow at Somerville College, Oxford. Carter was also a political lecturer at the universities of Lancaster and Queensland, and was a Fellow at the Stockholm International Peace Research Institute from 1985 to 1987. She was an Honorary Research Fellow of the Centre for Peace and Reconciliation Studies, Coventry University, and a 'senior editor' on the international editorial board for the International Encyclopedia of Peace to be published by Oxford University Press (New York).

On 16 August 2022, Carter died at her home in Letchworth Garden City aged 84.

== Bibliography ==
- The Political Theory of Anarchism (Harper & Row, 1971) ISBN 978-0-06-136050-3
- Authority and Democracy (Routledge & Kegan Paul PLC, 1979) ISBN 978-0-7100-0090-3
- Politics of Women's Rights (Longman, 1988) ISBN 978-0-582-02400-7
- Success and Failure in Arms Control Negotiations (Stockholm International Peace Research Institute monographs) (Oxford University Press, 1989)
- Peace Movements (Longman, 1992)
- The Political Theory of Global Citizenship (Routledge, 2001 and 2006 in paperback). ISBN 978-0-415-16954-7 & ISBN 978-0-415-39944-9
- Direct Action and Democracy Today (Polity Press, 2005) ISBN 978-0-7456-2936-0
- People Power and Political Change: Key Issues and Concepts (Routledge 2012) ISBN 978-0-415-58049-6
- A Guide to Civil Resistance: Volume one: A Bibliography of People Power and Nonviolent Protest (Green Print, 2013) ISBN 978-1-85425-108-4
- A Guide to Civil Resistance: Volume two: A Bibliography of Social Movements and Nonviolent Action (Green Print, 2015) ISBN 978-1-85425-113-8

== See also ==
- List of peace activists
