= Barbara Webb =

Roboticist

Barbara Webb FRSE
- Born: Barbara Helen Webb
- Education: University of Sydney (BSc); University of Edinburgh (PhD)
- Employer(s): University of Edinburgh; University of Nottingham; University of Stirling
- Known for: Insectoid robots
- Scientific career
- Fields: Biorobotics; Insect behaviour Neural circuits
- Thesis: Perception in real and artificial insects: a robotic investigation of cricket phonotaxis (1993)
- Website: homepages.inf.ed.ac.uk/bwebb

Barbara Helen Webb FRSE is a professor of robotics at the University of Edinburgh. She builds robotic models of insects.

== Education ==
Webb completed a bachelor's degree in Psychology at the University of Sydney in 1988. She earned her PhD in Artificial Intelligence from the University of Edinburgh in 1993.

== Research and career ==
Webb joined the University of Nottingham in 1995. In 1999 she moved to the University of Stirling. In 2001 she published the book Biorobotics - Methods and Applications with Thomas Consi.

She moved back to the School of Informatics at the University of Edinburgh in May 2003. In 2004 she contributed to the publication Foresight Cognitive Systems Project Research Review, Robotics and Cognition.

Webb is interested in understanding how perceptual systems control of behaviour, which she studies by building computational and robotic models. To understand this she studies the behaviour of insects, whose smaller nervous systems are simpler than humans. Her group use computational modelling to understand the behaviour at a neural level. They test their models in agent and robot systems. She believes the behaviours, sensors and small brains of insects should be inspiration for efficient processing algorithms for sensorimotor control. Her group research the navigation of ants, learning abilities of drosophila and movement of crickets. She uses insect inspired robotics as an approach to control system design.

She was appointed to a professor of Biorobotics in 2010. Her inaugural lecture discussed how biological systems are examples of the kind of machines roboticists want to build. That year, she delivered the University of Edinburgh Christmas Lecture.

Webb is interested in how ants, with brains small enough to fit on a pin head, can manage to navigate back to their homes. In 2017 she demonstrated how ants use the position of the sun to walk backwards. The discovery attracted media attention and in an interview Webb said that they "could be taking images and comparing them continuously, but are able to mentally rotate the views to adjust to backward walking".

== Awards and honours ==
Webb was elected a Fellow of the Royal Society of Edinburgh (FRSE) in 2022.
