= Pat Arrowsmith =

British writer and peace campaigner (1930–2023)

- Born: Margaret P. Arrowsmith; 2 March 1930; Leamington Spa, England
- Died: 27 September 2023 (aged 93); London, England
- Education: Newnham College, Cambridge; University of Liverpool; Ohio University
- Occupations: Author; peace campaigner
- Known for: Co-founder of the Campaign for Nuclear Disarmament

Margaret P. Arrowsmith (2 March 1930 – 27 September 2023) was a British author and peace campaigner. She was a co-founder of the Campaign for Nuclear Disarmament (CND) in 1957.

== Early life ==
Margaret P. Arrowsmith was born on 2 March 1930, into a family in Leamington Spa as the youngest of three children. Her mother was Margaret Vera Arrowsmith (née Kingham) and her father Reverend G. E. Arrowsmith.

In 1939, the family moved to Torquay, where Arrowsmith studied at Stover School, before transferring to Cheltenham Ladies College in September 1944. She read history at Newnham College, Cambridge, and then read social science at the University of Liverpool and at Ohio University as a US–UK Fulbright Scholar.

== Campaigning activities ==
Arrowsmith was a peace campaigner and worked to campaign for nuclear disarmament, an end to the Vietnam War, the removal of British troops from Northern Ireland, an end to the Gulf War, and feminist and lesbian issues.

=== Peace campaigning ===
Arrowsmith was a co-founder of the Campaign for Nuclear Disarmament and was one of its vice-presidents. She was one of the organisers of the first Aldermaston march. She was also one of the original signatories of the Committee of 100. From 1958 onward, she served eleven prison sentences for her political activities. In 1961, she was the subject of parliamentary questions after she was force-fed while on hunger strike in Gateside prison. She also worked for the human-rights organisation Amnesty International for 24 years up to 1994, and was the organisation's first prisoner of conscience in Britain.

==== 1974 conviction for incitement ====
In 1974, Arrowsmith was convicted of offences against sections 1 and 2 of the Incitement to Disaffection Act 1934, and sentenced to 18 months in prison for having handed out leaflets at a British army base, urging soldiers to refuse to serve in Northern Ireland.

==== Escape from prison ====
On 7 September 1974, Arrowsmith absconded from Askham Grange open prison. After walking out from prison, Arrowsmith spoke at an anti-fascist demonstration in Hyde Park and befriended lesbian and gay attendees. In an interview with the 5 Cally Road research project, Nettie Pollard (a member of the Gay Liberation Front), recalled Arrowsmith saying to LGBT protestors, "Well, why don't we go to Housmans?" The group took sanctuary at the 5 Caledonian Road premises shared by the radical bookshop Housmans and the pacifist newspaper Peace News. Upon arrival, the group contacted The Press Association to say: "There's a fugitive at Housmans, 5 Caledonian Road." Their photographs appeared on the front page of The Sunday Telegraph. When arresting officers appeared at the scene, Arrowsmith refused to walk downstairs and was carried down three flights of stairs.

==== Appeal ====
In 1975, the Court of Appeal dismissed her appeal, describing her conduct as "mischievous" and "wicked". However, it upheld her appeal against the sentence, reducing it so that she would be immediately released.

Arrowsmith filed a case against the United Kingdom (Arrowsmith v. United Kingdom) in the European Commission of Human Rights, claiming her conviction violated the European Convention on Human Rights' protections of her rights to liberty and freedom of belief and expression. In 1978, the Commission found her conviction "a necessary restriction on the exercise of free speech in the interests of national security and for the prevention of disorder", and so did not violate the Convention.

=== Running for Parliament ===
Arrowsmith was an unsuccessful candidate of the Radical Alliance, a CND splinter group, for Fulham in the 1966 and 1970 general elections.

Arrowsmith stood as an Independent Socialist candidate, campaigning for Troops Out of Northern Ireland and supported by the Trotskyist Socialist Unity party against the then Prime Minister, James Callaghan, in his constituency of Cardiff South-East in the parliamentary general election of 1979. During Callaghan's customary acceptance speech on re-election, Arrowsmith carried on sustained heckling. Callaghan, in response to the heckling, remarked that it was the first time he had "conducted a duet in returning a vote of thanks, and that it was not a particularly tuneful duet." He then suggested that Arrowsmith might be invited to take the platform, which she did, while he, his supporters, all the other candidates and the returning officer left the hall. However, her short speech was broadcast on the BBC. It demanded a withdrawal of British troops from Northern Ireland and self-determination for its people.

== Personal life ==
Arrowsmith was involved in a personal relationship with a fellow peace campaigner, Wendy Butlin, who was also one of the original signatories for the Committee of 100. Ineligible to qualify for her father's inheritance unless she were married to a man, Arrowsmith married poet Donald Gardner for one day, before having the marriage annulled. She then donated some of the money to various political causes, including Gay Pride Week 1979.

Arrowsmith died on 27 September 2023, aged 93.

== Publications ==
Arrowsmith published several novels and works of poetry. Her archive and personal papers are held at the LSE Library in London.

=== Novels ===
- (1949) Camp Christopher
- (1965) Jericho
- (1970) Somewhere like this
- (1982) The Prisoner
- (1998) Many are called

=== Memoirs ===
- (1995) I should have been a Hornby Train

=== Poetry ===
- (1975) Breakout: poems and drawings from prison
- (1981) On the Brink
- (1984) Thin Ice: peace poems
- (2000) Drawing to Extinction: poems and pictures
- (2005) Going On
- (2009) Dark Light

=== Non-fiction ===
- (1972) To Asia in Peace
- (1972) The Colour of Six Schools
- (1990) Nine Lives

== See also ==
- List of peace activists
