= Direct Action Committee =

British nonviolent disarmament activist organization (1957–61)

The Direct Action Committee Against Nuclear War or the Direct Action Committee (DAC) was a pacifist organisation formed "to assist the conducting of non-violent direct action to obtain the total renunciation of nuclear war and its weapons by Britain and all other countries as a first step in disarmament". It existed from 1957 to 1961, when it was largely subsumed into the Committee of 100, but it was, historian Martin Shaw argues, the original driving force of the mass movement against nuclear weapons in Britain.

== Origins ==
The DAC was formed in response to the British H-Bomb tests carried out between 1956 and 1958. In 1957, at the time of one of the tests on Christmas Island, Harold Steele planned to sail into the test area in protest. He was unable to do so but his supporters formed a committee and marched in support to the Atomic Weapons Establishment at Aldermaston.

The original committee comprised:

- J. Allen Skinner
- Hugh Brock and
- Arlo Tatum.

They were soon joined by:

- Michael Randle (who became Chair)
- April Carter (Secretary)
- Pat Arrowsmith (Field Secretary)
- Michael Scott and
- Will Warren.

By the end of 1958 the Committee's members also included Alex Comfort, Frances Edwards, Sheila Jones, Francis Jude and Michael Howard (of the Crusade for World Government) who later served as adjutant to Bertrand Russell during his dispute with Canon John Collins over the legitimacy of direct action.

== Actions ==
The DAC's march from London to Aldermaston at Easter, 1958, for which DAC Committee member Michael Howard was the Chief Marshal was, in the event, supported by the newly formed Campaign for Nuclear Disarmament (CND), and in the upsurge of popular opposition to the H-bomb attracted thousands of people. The Aldermaston March was subsequently run as an annual event by CND.

The DAC organised meetings, marches, vigils and pickets, campaigned in parliamentary elections and carried out acts of civil disobedience to publicise the pacifist cause. Following the principles of the Indian nationalist leader M.K.Gandhi, they believed their actions should be non-violent and carried out at some personal cost to themselves, such as losing their jobs or going to jail.

What differentiated them from other peace organisations at the time was their attempt to persuade people to stop working in industries connected with nuclear weapons, in which they had some successes. After the 1958 Aldermaston march, the DAC stayed in the Aldermaston area to try to stop work at the Atomic Weapons Establishment. They picketed, met with trades unions, held factory gate meetings and canvassed in the surrounding villages. As a result, five workers resigned from their jobs, three job applicants withdrew and five drivers refused to deliver to the establishment. The DAC then moved to Norfolk to campaign against the Thor nuclear missiles at an RAF base at North Pickenham, using similar methods to those they had used at Aldermaston. One worker left the base and others said they would do so if they could find other jobs. They then moved to Stevenage, Hertfordshire, to campaign against the de Havilland and English Electric factories, which made guided missiles.

The DAC ran a "No votes for the H-bomb" campaign in the 1959 South West Norfolk by-election. They worked with similar organisations outside the UK, demonstrating against nuclear tests in the Sahara Desert and in a peace march from San Francisco to Moscow, organised by the Committee for Non-Violent Action in 1961. Their final action before being wound up was a demonstration against the Polaris nuclear submarine in spring, 1961.

== Sponsors ==
The sponsors of the DAC were:

- Horace Alexander
- Frank Allaun
- John Berger
- Alex Comfort
- Charles Coulson
- Arthur Goss
- Doris Lessing
- Ben Levy
- Wolf Mankowitz
- Ethel Mannin
- Martin Niemöller
- John Boyd Orr
- Bertrand Russell
- Donald Soper

Later sponsors were:

- Lindsay Anderson
- Claude Bourdet
- John Braine
- Hugh Brock
- Constance Cummings
- K. A. Gbedemah
- Ammon Hennacy
- Homer Jack
- Winifred de Kok
- Pierre Martin
- George Melly
- Spike Milligan
- A. J. Muste
- Jayaprakash Narayan
- John Osborne
- Linus Pauling
- E. C. Quaye
- Herbert Read
- Archbishop Roberts
- Ernie Roberts
- Bayard Rustin
- Sydney Silverman

== Demise ==
The formation in 1960 of the Committee of 100, a mass civil disobedience movement against nuclear weapons, plus considerable financial difficulties, led to the decision in June 1961 to wind down the DAC. Most of its members were active in the Committee of 100.

== Assessment ==
As long as it lasted, the DAC was effectively the direct-action wing of CND, whose leadership were either uncertain about direct action or opposed to it. There was an overlap between supporters of CND and supporters of the DAC. The sponsors of the DAC included the president of CND (Bertrand Russell), three members of CND's executive committee and other CND leaders. Pat Arrowsmith, a pacifist and consistent supporter of direct action, was appointed assistant secretary of CND after the first Aldermaston March. The DAC depended on the support of many local CND groups and was also given money by the CND executive committee.

However, there were differences in age, background and political experience between the members of DAC and the CND leadership, and there were considerable differences in tactics and ideology. Christopher Driver in his book on the early years of CND says of the DAC, "For the most part the members of the DAC were people of exceptionally pure motives. ... Unlike the CND Executive, and unlike some of their successors in the Committee of 100 into which the DAC was eventually merged, many DAC members were not particularity interested in the local and national publicity which their actions evoked, except insofar as it helped to make converts to Gandhi's ideas on non-violent action."

== See also ==
- List of anti-war organisations
- List of peace activists
