= Hugh Brock =

British pacifist who edited Peace News

Hugh Brock (15 May 1914 – 1985) was a lifelong British pacifist, editor of Peace News between 1955 and 1964, a promoter of nonviolent direct action and a founder of the Direct Action Committee, a forerunner of the Committee of 100.

== Peace News ==
Hugh Brock was born on 15 May 1914 and trained as a printer at the London School of Printing. He was a conscientious objector in World War II. In May 1940, in the face of new defence regulations and demands in parliament for the banning of Peace News, its printer refused to continue printing it and, at the same time, the Wholesale Newsagent Association, which handled two-thirds of the circulation, refused to distribute it any longer. Working with the editor, Humphrey Moore, Brock and his brother, Ashley, (A H Brock) took on responsibility for its printing, ignoring any potential threat under the regulations and, with peace groups across Britain, created an efficient voluntary distribution chain. Brock served a six-month prison sentence in 1941, during which time his wife Eileen gave birth to their son Jeremy. They also had a daughter, Carolyn, who was born in 1944.

Brock took on the role of assistant editor of Peace News in 1946 and became editor in 1955. He shifted the focus of Peace News towards campaigning for nuclear disarmament, nonviolent direct action and the movement for colonial freedom. In 1955 he appointed the American academic Gene Sharp to Peace News to cover the Civil Rights Movement. At that time the newspaper was the official organ of the Peace Pledge Union (PPU) but this formal link was broken in 1961. He left Peace News in 1964.

== Non-violent protest in Britain ==
Between 1946 and 1952 Peace News published more than 160 articles dedicated to the discussion of Gandhi's relevance to the West. During the 1950s Hugh Brock played a significant role in the growth of nonviolent protest in Britain. In November 1949 the PPU had set up a Nonviolence Commission to study nonviolent resistance and the ideas of Gandhi. In December 1951 some members formed 'Operation Gandhi' to organise nonviolent direct action directly inspired by Gandhi. Among their aims were the withdrawal of US troops from Britain and an end to Britain's production of atomic weapons. Brock was secretary of this group. Its activities began with a sit-down outside the War Office on 11 January 1952. Eleven protesters squatted in front of the War Office, having first notified the police. The protesters did not resist arrest and pleaded guilty to the charges against them, following principles of nonviolence.

There were other protests at Aldermaston, Mildenhall, Porton Down and the Atomic Energy Research Establishment at Harwell. The protest march to Aldermaston in 1952 involved just 35 people and paved the way for the much larger Aldermaston Marches that began in 1958.

In 1957 Hugh Brock was one of a committee that arranged protests against British testing of the H-bomb on Christmas Island in the Pacific. The committee later became the Direct Action Committee, which organised the 1958 Aldermaston March. With the formation in 1960 of the Committee of 100, which organised civil disobedience against nuclear weapons on a larger scale, the Direct Action Committee merged into the new organisation.

== Later life ==
After leaving Peace News Brock continued to be involved with peace campaigning until his death in 1985. He kept a large number of papers, which were donated to the University of Bradford by his wife Eileen.

The Hugh Brock Memorial Library in Kitwe in Zambia was established in his memory.

== See also ==
- List of peace activists

Media offices
Preceded by J. Allen Skinner	Editor of Peace News; 1955–1964	Succeeded by Theodore Roszak
