= Dick Sheppard (priest) =

English Anglican priest (1880-1937)

- Dean of Canterbury
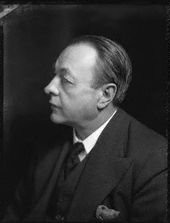
- Church: Canterbury Cathedral
- In office: 1929–1931
- Other posts: Vicar, St Martin-in-the-Fields (1914–1926); Rector of Glasgow University (1937)

Orders
- Ordination: 1908

Personal details
- Born: 2 September 1880 Windsor, Berkshire, UK
- Died: 31 October 1937 (aged 57) City of London, UK
- Buried: Canterbury Cathedral
- Denomination: Anglican
- Residence: Paternoster Row (at death)
- Parents: Edgar Sheppard & Mary née White
- Spouse: Alison Lennox (m. 1915)
- Children: 2 daughters
- Education: Trinity Hall, Cambridge

Hugh Richard Lawrie Sheppard CH (2 September 1880 – 31 October 1937) was an English Anglican priest, Dean of Canterbury and Christian pacifist.

== Early life and education ==
Sheppard was the younger son of Edgar Sheppard, a minor canon at the Royal Chapel of All Saints in Windsor, and Mary White. Born at the Cloisters in Windsor, he was educated at Marlborough College and then (1901–1904) Trinity Hall, Cambridge. He worked with the poor from the Anglo-Catholic Oxford House, Bethnal Green and then for a year as secretary to Cosmo Lang, then Bishop of Stepney.

He volunteered to serve in the Second Boer War: however, an injury sustained while en route to the railway station rendered him permanently disabled and unable to serve.

== Career ==
He studied for the ministry at Cuddesdon College and was ordained priest in 1908. Returning to work with the poor at Oxford House, in 1910 he suffered the first of what would prove to be recurrent breakdowns due to overwork.

With the onset of war, Sheppard spent some months as chaplain to a military hospital in France, before being sent home with exhaustion. He had joined the chaplaincy soon after war was declared. Bishop Gwynne, who became deputy chaplain-general on the Western Front, wrote of Sheppard, 'He is a man of real magnetic power and has left his living of St Martin's-in-the-Fields to come out with the Australian hospital'. Sheppard wrote to Lang of his experiences,

"I've sat in a dugout expecting the Germans at any moment all through one night. I've held a leg and several other limbs while the surgeon amputated them. I've fought a drunken Tommy and protected several German prisoners from a French mob. I've missed a thousand opportunities and lived through a life's experience in five weeks."

Sheppard had a breakdown which resulted from this experience, and these few weeks in France affected his view of warfare. Supported by Lang, he returned to the fashionable and high-profile living at St Martin-in-the-Fields, turning the church into an accessible social centre for all those in need. He married Alison Lennox, who had nursed him during his breakdowns, in 1915.

From 1924, when Sheppard provided the first service ever broadcast by the BBC, his broadcast sermons gave him national fame. However, another breakdown and acute asthma led to his resignation in 1926. Having become a pacifist, he articulated a vision of a non-institutional church in The Impatience of a Parson (1927). Sheppard was partly responsible for the annual Festival of Remembrance that takes place in the Royal Albert Hall, London on the first Saturday in November before Remembrance Sunday. In November 1925 he wrote to The Times protesting against a proposed Charity Ball on Armistice Day. Following a nationwide response a solemn ceremony In Memory replaced the Ball. Such was its resonance with the public that it became an annual event that continues to this day.

Lang, appointed Archbishop of Canterbury in 1928, supported the appointment of Sheppard as Dean of Canterbury in 1929. Although his preaching attracted huge audiences, illness once again forced resignation in 1931.

== After resignation ==
Trying to develop a public political platform for pacifism, with Herbert Gray and Maude Royden, Sheppard proposed in 1931 a Peace Army of unarmed peacemakers to stand between the Chinese and Japanese armies in Shanghai. More successfully, he issued a call for "peace pledges" in 1934. He published We Say 'No' (1935) and formally established the Peace Pledge Union in 1936. In 1937 – the year of his death aged 57 – his wife left him and students elected him Rector of Glasgow University.

== Death and legacy ==
Sheppard died at home in Paternoster Row and his funeral in St Paul's Cathedral drew huge crowds. He is buried in the cloisters at Canterbury Cathedral.

The character of the priest Robert Carbury in Vera Brittain's novel Born 1925 is based on Sheppard.

There is a memorial chapel named after Sheppard at St Martin-in-the Fields. The former office of the Peace Pledge Union was called Dick Sheppard House. An altar cross and candlesticks were presented as a memorial in Sheppard's name to Guildford Cathedral in 1957 by his friends and family.

== Publications ==
- The Human Parson (1925)
- My Hopes and Fears for the Church (1930)
- The Impatience of a Parson (1930)
- The Psalms for modern life (1933; illustrated by Arthur Wragg)
- If I Were Dictator (1935, contributor to Methuen & Co. LTD series)
- Two days before : simple thoughts about Our Lord on the cross (1935)
- We say "No" : the plain man's guide to pacificism (1935)
- "Introduction" to We Did Not Fight : 1914–18 experiences of war resisters by Julian Bell (1935)
- H. R. L. Sheppard : A Note in Appreciation (1937)
- Sheppard's Pie (1937)
- The Root of the Matter (1937)
- The Christian attitude to war : St. Mary Woolnoth, 26 February 1937 (1937)
- Let Us Honour Peace (1937; with Rose Macaulay, J. D. Beresford, Gerald Heard, Vera Brittain, Captain Philip S. Mumford, L.B. Pekin, Canon C.E. Raven, E. Graham Howe, Elizabeth Thorneycroft, and R.H. Ward).
- More Sheppard's Pie (1938)
- Peace : A challenge to the Church (1973)

== See also ==
- List of peace activists

Academic offices
Preceded by Iain Colquhoun	Rector of the University of Glasgow; 1937	Succeeded by Archie Sinclair
