= UK undercover policing scandal =

British policing scandal

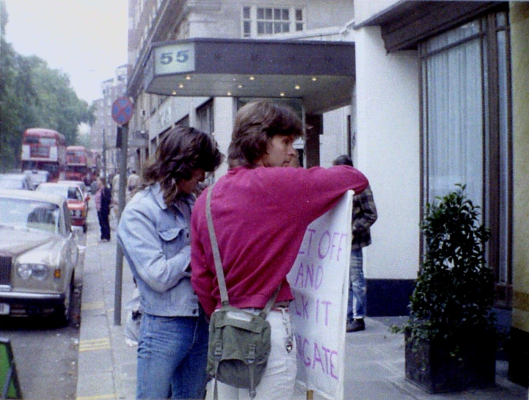
Bob Lambert at a Unigate demo

Around the end of 2010 and during 2011, it was disclosed in UK media that a number of undercover police officers had, as part of their 'false persona', entered into intimate relationships with members of targeted groups and in some cases proposed marriage or fathered children with protesters who were unaware their partner was a police officer in a role as part of their official duties. The groups affected were predominantly left-wing and progressive.

Various legal actions followed, including eight women who took action against the Metropolitan Police and the Association of Chief Police Officers (ACPO), stating they were deceived into long-term intimate relationships by five officers, including Mark Kennedy, the first officer to be identified as such, who was publicly identified on 21 October 2010 as infiltrating social and environmental justice campaigns, and Mark Kennedy himself who claimed in turn that he had been incompetently handled by his superiors and denied psychological counselling. According to The Guardian, Kennedy sued the police for ruining his life and failing to "protect" him from falling in love with one of the environmental activists whose movement he infiltrated.

Although the units had been previously disbanded, other cases continued to emerge. In 2015 the Undercover Policing Inquiry under a senior judge was announced. In November 2015, the Metropolitan Police published an unreserved apology in which it exonerated and apologised to those women who had been deceived and stated the methodology had constituted abuse and a "gross violation" with severely harmful effects, as part of a settlement of their cases. New cases to came to light in 2016.

== Background ==
Mark Kennedy (also known as Mark Stone and Flash) is a former London Metropolitan Police officer who, while attached to the police service's National Public Order Intelligence Unit (NPOIU), infiltrated many protest groups between 2003 and 2010 before he was unmasked by political activists as an undercover policeman on 21 October 2010. In January 2011, it was reported that Kennedy worked for several years as an undercover infiltrator for the National Public Order Intelligence Unit , with seven years' work in the environmental protest movement.

During this time, he had entered into intimate relationships on false pretences, which came to light during 2010 as being part of a systemic pattern of exploitation and manipulation of women in such movements. It also emerged that some of these undercover police relationships had resulted in children whose fathers later "vanished" when their role was completed.

== Activist Groups formed in response to the Spycops scandal ==
Several activist groups formed following the revelations. These included Police Spies Out of Lives (PSOOL), the Undercover Research Group and the umbrella group Campaign Opposing Police Spies (COPS). All three groups, alongside the Blacklist Support Group and The Monitoring Group, critically participate in the Inquiry.

== Other related undercover controversies ==
It later emerged that Kennedy had previously undertaken criminal acts as part of his role for other countries, including Denmark where he stated that, in the guise of an environmental activist, he was used by the police forces of 22 countries and was responsible for the closing down of the Youth House community centre in Copenhagen, and in Germany, for German police, including arson. German MP Andrej Hunko raised questions in the German Bundestag concerning what the German authorities knew about Kennedy's activities among the Berlin protest movement. Kennedy had been arrested in Berlin for attempted arson, but was never brought to trial. Hunko also asked: "How does the federal government justify the fact that [Mark Kennedy], as part of his operation in Germany, did not only initiate long-term meaningful friendships but also sexual relationships, clearly under false pretenses?" The German government refused to answer all questions relating to Kennedy.

The use of undercover officers also caused the collapse of trials and led to the revelation of unlawful withholding of evidence by the Crown Prosecution Service. The trial of six activists accused of conspiracy to commit aggravated trespass at Ratcliffe-on-Soar Power Station collapsed following the revelation of undercover police involvement, in which the police were described as having been not just observers, but agents provocateurs: "We're not talking about someone sitting at the back of the meeting taking notes – he was in the thick of it."

Crown Prosecution Service (CPS) barrister Felicity Gerry was forced to withdraw the case against the activists after Kennedy confessed to the set-up, evidence of which the CPS had withheld from the defence. The CPS also withheld the fact that Kennedy was giving testimony under the false name Mark Stone using a false passport supplied by the police. Secret tapes "that could have exonerated six activists, known as the "deniers" because they claimed not to have agreed to join the protest" and "evidence gathered by the Guardian now suggests it was the Crown Prosecution Service rather than the police that withheld the tapes." CPS lawyer Ian Cunningham faced dismissal after a report by Sir Christopher Rose criticised Cunningham for failing to ask questions about Kennedy's involvement in the Ratcliffe plot.

A 2025 criminal case involving police informer Nick Gratwick revealed he infiltrated environmental and animal rights campaigns in the 1990s to 2000s.

== Impact, inquiry and aftermath of disclosures ==
In November 2015 the Metropolitan Police force apologised to seven women "tricked into relationships" over a period of 25 years by officers in the Special Demonstration Squad (SDS) and the National Public Order Intelligence Unit (NPOIU). The officers involved had eventually "vanished", leaving questions and deceit behind, described by victims as "psychological torture". Financial settlements estimated at £3 million for the seven claimants were also made as part of the settlement.

The disclosures also led to the closing of the units concerned, and a public inquiry, the Undercover Policing Inquiry, concerning the conduct of police in undercover operations. The inquiry is headed by senior judge Lord Justice Pitchford, a Lord Justice of Appeal and member of the Privy Council. One group representing victims of such practices is the Undercover Research Group, whose website provides alternative coverage and comments on the inquiry.

The inquiry along with subsequent court proceedings have confirmed that undercover police had infiltrated the following groups and movements:

- Anarchist groups
- Animal Liberation Front
- Anti-Apartheid Movement
- Anti-Fascist Action
- Big Flame
- Black Power movement
- Brixton Hunt Saboteurs
- Colin Roach Centre
- Dambusters Mobilising Committee
- Dissent!
- Earth First!
- Essex Hunt Saboteurs
- Friends of Freedom Press Ltd
- Globalise Resistance
- Independent Labour Party
- Independent Working Class Association
- International Marxist Group
- International Socialists
- Irish National Liberation Solidarity Front
- London Animal Action
- London Animal Rights Coalition
- London Boots Action Group
- London Greenpeace
- Militant
- No Platform
- Antifa
- Operation Omega
- Reclaim the Streets
- Red Action
- Republican Forum
- Revolutionary Socialist Students Federation
- Socialist Party (England and Wales)
- Socialist Workers Party
- South London Animal Movement (SLAM)
- Tri-Continental
- Troops Out Movement
- Vietnam Solidarity Campaign
- West London Hunt Saboteurs
- Workers Revolutionary Party
- Young Haganah
- Young Liberals
- Youth against Racism in Europe

Former policeman Andy Coles was elected in 2015 as a Conservative councillor on Peterborough City Council and appointed a deputy to the Cambridgeshire Police and Crime Commissioner in 2016. After a mention in his younger brother Richard Coles' autobiography, he was accused of having deceived a 19-year-old political activist into a sexual relationship while he was a 32-year-old undercover police officer in the 1990s. In February 1995 the then Detective Sergeant Coles wrote the "Tradecraft manual for undercover police". He resigned as deputy commissioner on 15 May 2017 but remained a city councillor until defeated in 2024.

Eventually at least 12 women received compensation from the police in the High Court of Justice, though the police avoided making internal documents about the relationships public.

=== Investigatory Powers Tribunal trial ===
Kate Wilson, one of the women who had sued the police in the high court over the relationship with undercover officer Mark Kennedy, started a case in 2018 at the Investigatory Powers Tribunal, alleging the police had infringed her human rights in five ways. In court documents, the police admitted that Kennedy's line manager and other officers were aware of the sexual relationship, stating "sexual relationship with [Wilson] was carried out with the acquiescence of his cover officers and line manager". Previously the police had suggested such relationships were not officially sanctioned.

== Scope for criminal charges ==
Rape in English law, a statutory offence against the Sexual Offences Act 1956, was defined under the Sexual Offences (Amendment) Act 1976 as "unlawful sexual intercourse with a woman who (a) at the time of the intercourse does not consent to it, and (b) at that time he knows that she does not consent to the intercourse or he is reckless as to whether she consents to it." This was the definition for most of the relevant time. A new definition was introduced by the Sexual Offences Act 2003, which applies to acts that are proved to have taken place after 1 May 2004: "A person (A) commits an offence [implicitly called 'rape' by this section's heading] if—(a) he intentionally penetrates the vagina, anus or mouth of another person (B) with his penis, (b) B does not consent to the penetration, and (c) A does not reasonably believe that B consents." When the fact of intercourse is not disputed, the basis of a prosecution therefore revolves around whether or not consent is given in law, or its absence was ignored.

The CPS statement clarified that misrepresenting identity, and obtaining sexual consent due to a false identity, was not generally a crime in UK law, other than in specific situations such as impersonating a person's partner, or deceit as to gender. Other than in specific limited situations set out in statute, the general rule in UK law is that deceit only creates a case of rape (known as "rape by deception" or "rape by fraud") if "the act consented to was not the act undertaken". Crown Prosecutors declined to bring charges against any police officers or their supervisors, including charges for rape and other sexual crimes (covering sex under false pretences, unconsented sexual acts, and other potential offences), on the basis that rape charges would be unlikely to succeed. For similar reasons, indecent assault, procurement for sexual intercourse by false pretences, and misconduct in office were also felt to lack sufficient basis for a conviction. A leading case on "rape by fraud" is R v Linekar, in which the Court of Appeal had previously held that very narrow restrictions should apply to such cases of deceit in the context of rape prosecutions. (The reasoning was that otherwise rape could be alleged following any minor broken promise or any misrepresentation with sexual activity, and would risk no longer being a uniformly serious offence.)

== Police response ==
In November 2015, the Metropolitan Police Service issued a statement, reading in part:

Thanks in large part to the courage and tenacity of these women in bringing these matters to light it has become apparent that some officers, acting undercover whilst seeking to infiltrate protest groups, entered into long-term intimate sexual relationships with women which were abusive, deceitful, manipulative and wrong.

...

In light of this settlement, it is hoped that the Claimants will now feel able to move on with their lives. The Metropolitan Police believes that they can now do so with their heads held high. The women have conducted themselves throughout this process with integrity and absolute dignity.

— Statement by Metropolitan Police Service, 20 November 2015

== Victims' ongoing concerns ==
In January 2016, further cases came to light. A complainant stated that they sought disclosure of the cover names of officers who were engaged undercover in this way, and their supervising officers, so that those who had been deceived into relationships, and potentially suffered thereby, would be able to discover the fact.

== See also ==
- Agent provocateur
- Bob Lambert (undercover police officer) – one of the undercover officers who engaged in a relationship with a protester
- Consent (criminal law) § Consent obtained by deception
- Covert policing in the United Kingdom
- Cuban Five – other intelligence officers whose relationships with unsuspecting victims resulted in litigation.
- Helen Steel – one of the victims of the scandal
- Rape in English law
