= Covert policing in the United Kingdom =

Police activities hidden from the public

Covert policing in the United Kingdom is employed to enable an officer of the British police to gather intelligence from and about suspects without alerting them that they are under observation.

== History ==
Much of Britain's police service throughout the early to mid-20th century consisted of police officers walking a beat, one in each neighbourhood. This gave rise to the term "bobbies on the beat" and "golden age policing", as the officers patrolled the streets on foot rather than from police cars. Possibly the most accurate television portrayal of the archetypal British policing was the BBC programme Dixon of Dock Green (1955 to 1976).

The Criminal Intelligence Branch (which Covert Policing was a branch of before SO designations were devised) was formed in March 1960 and provided surveillance on known criminals, keeping pace with criminal methodology and technology.

Most British police forces have formed units solely for covert policing operations. The Metropolitan Police Special Branch set up an undercover unit in March 1968 initially to infiltrate "left-wing direct-action groups" and later a wider remit, with the approval of the Labour government. It was first called the Special Operations Squad and later renamed the Special Demonstration Squad (SDS). It was disbanded in 2008, and in 2014 the Undercover Policing Inquiry was established to investigate the abuses carried out by the unit. Since then, most of the Specialist Operations units have been disbanded or merged, giving way to SO10 being merged into the Specialist Crime Directorate to be designated SCD10. Now designated as SC&O 10, it falls under the purview of Specialist Crime & Operations.

== 2009 G-20 protests ==
A Select Committee report on the 2009 G-20 London summit protests revealed that 25 undercover officers were deployed and were mixing with demonstrators. The overall charge, Bob Broadhurst, claimed that the deployment of undercover officers was unknown to him at the time, and that the plainclothes officers were "evidence gatherers".

== Disclosure of relationships and children by undercover officers ==
Around the end of 2010 and during 2011 it was disclosed in UK media that a number of undercover police officers had, as part of their 'false persona', entered into intimate relationships with members of targeted groups and in some cases proposed marriage or fathered children with protesters who were unaware their partner was a police officer in a role as part of their official duties. Various legal actions followed, including by eight women who took action against the Metropolitan Police and the Association of Chief Police Officers (ACPO), stating they were deceived into long-term intimate relationships by five officers, including Mark Kennedy, the first officer identified in 2010 as infiltrating social and environmental justice campaigns, and Mark Kennedy himself who claimed in turn that he had been incompetently handled by his superiors and denied psychological counselling. The Guardian reported that Kennedy sued the police for ruining his life and failing to "protect" him from falling in love with one of the environmental activists whose movement he infiltrated.

It later emerged that Kennedy had previously undertaken criminal acts as part of his role for other countries, including Denmark, where he stated that, in the guise of an environmental activist, he was used by the police forces of 22 countries and was responsible for the closing down of the Youth House community centre in Copenhagen, and in Germany, for German police, including arson. The use of undercover officers caused the collapse of trials, and led to the revelation of unlawful withholding of evidence by the Crown Prosecution Service. The trial of six activists accused of conspiracy to commit aggravated trespass at Ratcliffe-on-Soar Power Station collapsed following the revelation of undercover police involvement, in which the police were described as having been not just observers, but agent provocateurs, and the Crown Prosecution Service (CPS) was forced to withdraw the case after Kennedy confessed to the set-up, evidence of which the CPS had withheld from the defence, along with secret tapes "that could have exonerated six activists, known as the 'deniers' because they claimed not to have agreed to join the protest". CPS lawyer Ian Cunningham faced dismissal after a report by Sir Christopher Rose criticised him for his lack of candour.

In November 2015 the Metropolitan Police force apologised unreservedly to seven women "tricked into relationships" over a period of 25 years by officers in the Special Demonstration Squad (SDS) and the National Public Order Intelligence Unit (NPOIU). The officers involved had eventually "vanished", leaving questions and deceit behind, described by victims as "psychological torture". Financial settlements estimated at £3 million for the seven claimants were also made as part of the settlement.

Crown Prosecutors declined to bring charges against any police officers or their supervisors, including charges for rape and other sexual crimes (covering sex under false pretences, unconsented sexual acts, and other potential offences). The CPS statement stated that misrepresenting identity, and obtaining sexual consent due to a false identity, did not generally create an offence of rape in English law, other than in specific statutory-defined situations, and therefore rape charges would be unlikely to succeed. For similar reasons, indecent assault, procurement for sexual intercourse by false pretences, and misconduct in office were also felt to lack sufficient basis for a conviction.

The disclosures also led to the closing of the units concerned, and a public inquiry titled the "Undercover Policing Inquiry", concerning the conduct of police in undercover operations, led by Christopher Pitchford, a Lord Justice of Appeal and member of the Privy Council.

== Media ==
Several policemen who carried out undercover operations are profiled in the book Undercover: The True Story of Britain's Secret Police (2013).

The play Any Means Necessary is based on the infiltration of the Ratcliffe-on-Soar power station protest. It was the staged at Nottingham Playhouse in February 2016.

Spanner films in 2014 planned a television drama series based on the story of the undercover officers.

The police detective drama series Hinterland - Y Gwyll was broadcast from 2013 to 2016. It was set in Wales and shot in English and Welsh. The series is a Fiction Factory co-production with S4C, Tinopolis and All3Media International for S4C, BBC Wales, BBC 4 and Netflix.

== See also ==
- Bob Lambert
- Law enforcement in the United Kingdom
- Undercover
