= Mark Kennedy (police officer) =

British former undercover police officer

- Born: Mark Kennedy; 7 July 1969 (age 57); Camberwell, South London, England, United Kingdom
- Other name: Mark Stone
- Occupation: Former Metropolitan Police officer
- Known for: UK undercover policing relationships scandal

Mark Kennedy (born 7 July 1969), undercover name Mark Stone, is a former London Metropolitan Police officer who, whilst attached to the police service's National Public Order Intelligence Unit, (NPOIU) infiltrated many protest groups between 2003 and 2010 before he was unmasked by political activists as an undercover policeman on 21 October 2010 and his identity was confirmed by the media three days later. During his time under cover he manipulated and deceived several women into having sexual relationships with him with the knowledge of his superiors. An Investigatory Powers Tribunal found his actions to be an "abuse of the highest order" and had "grossly debased, degraded and humiliated" one of his victims.

== Career ==
Kennedy was born in Camberwell, South London, on 7 July 1969, joined the Metropolitan Police around 1994 and served with them until March 2010. He was revealed to be a police infiltrator of protest groups on 21 October 2010.

In January 2011, it was reported that Kennedy was one of the first officers to work as an undercover infiltrator for the National Public Order Intelligence Unit and had spent seven years within the environmental protest movement.

In a Channel 4 interview broadcast on 14 November 2011, Kennedy stated that, in the guise of an environmental activist, he was used by the police forces of 22 countries. He also claimed he was instrumental in the closing down the original Youth House community centre in Copenhagen.

Kennedy said he was hired by German police between 2004 and 2009 and allegedly committed two crimes on their behalf, one of which was arson. German MP Andrej Hunko raised questions in the German Bundestag concerning what the German authorities knew about Kennedy's activities amongst the Berlin protest movement. Kennedy had been arrested in Berlin for attempted arson but was never brought to trial. Hunko also asked: "How does the federal government justify the fact that [Mark Kennedy], as part of his operation in Germany, did not only initiate long-term meaningful friendships but also sexual relationships, clearly under false pretenses?" The federal government refused to answer all questions relating to Kennedy.

Kennedy was involved in several environmentalist campaigns in Ireland, such as Shell to Sea. He allegedly encouraged protestors to attack police during the May Day 2004 protests in Dublin.

In February 2010, while still serving as a police officer, he set up Tokra Ltd, a private company at the same address as a security firm that works for the energy company E.ON, the owners of Ratcliffe-on-Soar Power Station. Later in 2010, he set up Black Star High Access Ltd, based in east London.

He manipulated several women into having sexual relationships with him, with the knowledge of his superiors. The details of one is published in the book Disclosure by Kate Wilson.

== Aftermath ==
Kennedy said in an interview, arranged through his PR agent Max Clifford, that he suffered a version of Stockholm syndrome. According to The Guardian, Kennedy sued the police for ruining his life and failing to "protect" him from "falling in love" with one of the environmental activists whose movement he infiltrated. However, the person he referred to stated: "He wasn't just a man who lied to me in a relationship, he was a fictional character, and he was placed in my life by an employer, and his employer was the police, and in order to create that deception he was trained. He was trained in manipulation techniques, he was trained in lying. A back story was created for him by and with his employers. He had a back-room team of people supporting him wherever he went, he had a handler, he had people who were issuing him with fake ID. He was being paid overtime for the nights that he spent with me, which must have amounted to quite a lot of money."

In 2011, eight women who say they were deceived into having long-term intimate relationships by five officers, including Kennedy, who had infiltrated social and environmental justice campaigns, began legal action against the Metropolitan Police and the Association of Chief Police Officers (ACPO). A support group, Police Spies Out of Lives, has been set up not just to provide support for these women, but to also call for the Pitchford Undercover Policing Inquiry to investigate "all aspects of the complete disregard shown for human rights" and initiated a petition that it be "transparent, robust and comprehensive". Eventually, at least 12 women received compensation from the police in the High Court of Justice over similar issues, although the police avoided making internal documents about the relationships public.

=== Investigatory Powers Tribunal trial ===
Kate Wilson, one of the women who had sued the police in the high court, started a case in 2018 at the Investigatory Powers Tribunal, alleging the police had infringed her human rights in five ways. In court documents, the police admitted that Kennedy's line manager and other officers were aware of the sexual relationship, stating "sexual relationship with [Wilson] was carried out with the acquiescence of his cover officers and line manager". Previously the police had suggested such relationships were not officially sanctioned. The tribunal found that Kennedy had "invaded the core of her private life", "caused her mental suffering" and that he had "interfered" with her "sexual autonomy" and showed "a profound lack of respect" for her "bodily integrity and human dignity." It found that his actions were an "abuse of the highest order." In January 2022 the tribunal found that Kennedy had "grossly debased, degraded and humiliated" his victim and awarded her £229,000 in compensation. The tribunal described Kennedy as a "highly unreliable narrator" and stated "we do not consider we can put any weight on statements and comments he has made".

=== Ratcliffe power station trial ===
The case against six activists accused of conspiracy to commit aggravated trespass at Ratcliffe-on-Soar Power Station collapsed following the revelation of Kennedy's activities as an undercover policeman.

Danny Chivers, who was one of the six successful defendants in the case, said Kennedy was not just an observer, but an agent provocateur. "We're not talking about someone sitting at the back of the meeting taking notes – he was in the thick of it."

In a taped conversation obtained by BBC Newsnight and broadcast on 10 January 2011, Kennedy told an activist he was "sorry" and "wanted to make amends". Kennedy admitted he had been a serving police officer at the time of the Ratcliffe arrests, but said he was not one now. He also told the activist "I hate myself so much I betrayed so many people...I owe it to a lot of good people to do something right for a change ... I'm really sorry."

Crown Prosecution Service (CPS) barrister Felicity Gerry was forced to withdraw the case against the activists after Kennedy confessed to the set-up, evidence of which the CPS had withheld from the defence. The CPS also withheld the fact that Kennedy was giving testimony under the false name Mark Stone using a false passport supplied by the police. Secret tapes recorded by Kennedy were also withheld by the CPS. The Guardian reported that "Kennedy's tapes were secret evidence that could have exonerated six activists, known as the "deniers" because they claimed not to have agreed to join the protest" and "evidence gathered by the Guardian now suggests it was the Crown Prosecution Service rather than the police that withheld the tapes". CPS lawyer Ian Cunningham faced dismissal after a report by Sir Christopher Rose criticised Cunningham for failing to ask questions about Kennedy's involvement in the Ratcliffe plot.

== Media ==
Kennedy is one of several now-exposed undercover police officers profiled in the book Undercover: The True Story of Britain's Secret Police (2012). A television drama series is based on the story of the undercover officers.

The play Any Means Necessary is based on the infiltration of the Ratcliffe-on-Soar power station protest. It was the staged at Nottingham Playhouse in February 2016.

Andy Whittaker produced a series of podcasts for BBC Sounds about Kennedy. Whittaker looked at the effect the officer's actions had on the groups, friends and partners with whom he became acquainted using his false identity. Called 'Undercover' it was released 23 January 2024.

== See also ==
- Covert policing in the United Kingdom
- Law enforcement in the United Kingdom
- Bob Lambert (undercover police officer and academic)
