= 2004 Dublin May Day protests =

On 1 May 2004 there was a physical confrontation in the Dublin suburb of Ashtown between riot police and alter-globalisation activists. On that day there was a summit of EU leaders taking place at Farmleigh House in the Phoenix Park. Protestors affiliated with the Dublin Grassroots Network and other left-wing groups attempted to march to Farmleigh but were blocked by Gardaí at the Ashtown roundabout. A small number of protestors broke off from the main group and clashed with Gardaí at the roundabout. The Gardaí used water cannons against the protestors, eventually dispersing them. This was the first time that police had used water cannons in the Republic of Ireland.

== Background ==
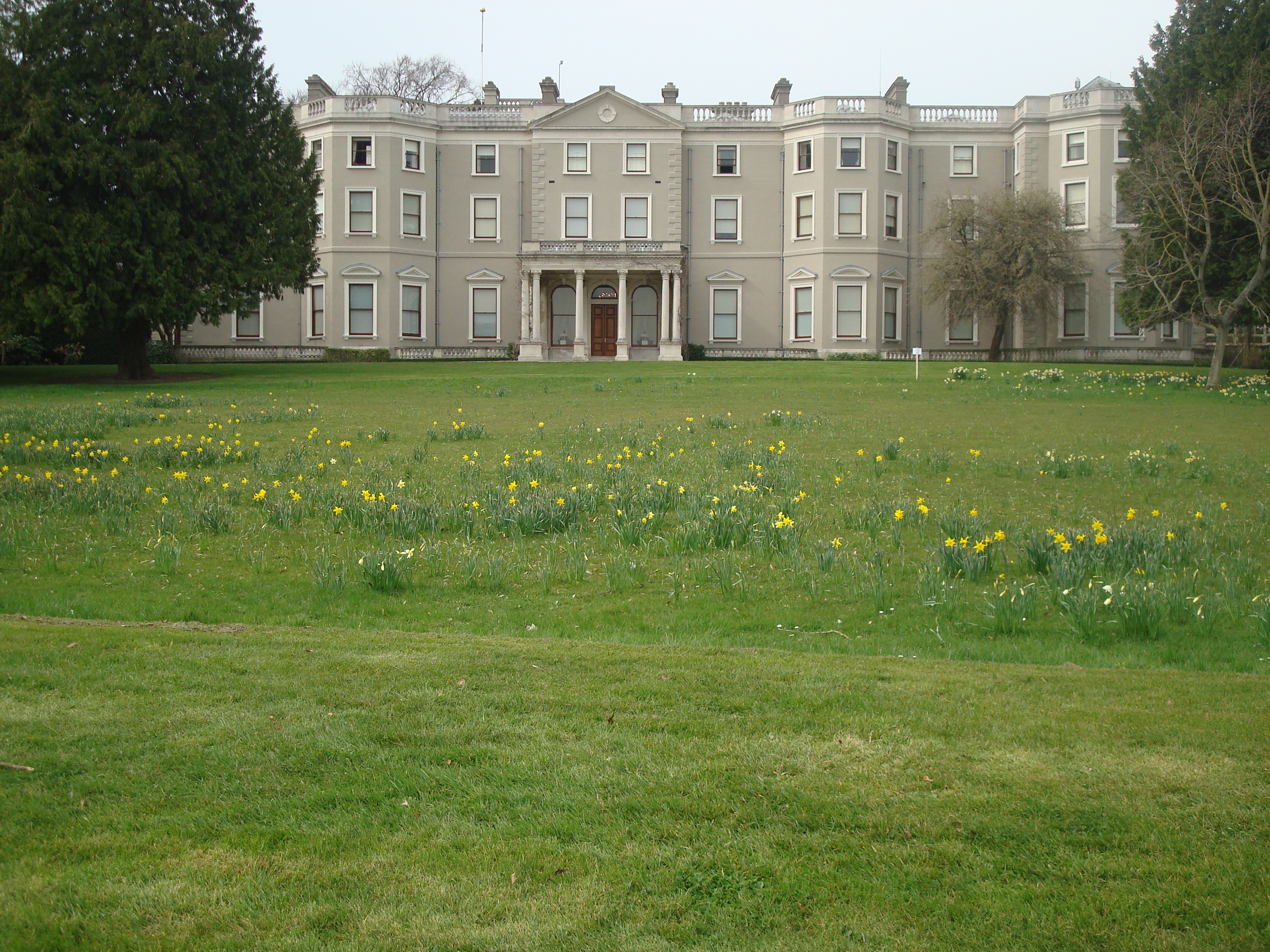
Front of Farmleigh House

In 2004 Ireland assumed the Presidency of the Council of the European Union. On Saturday 1 May a summit was held in Farmleigh House in the Phoenix Park with twenty-five European prime ministers to celebrate the accession of ten states to the EU on that date. In addition to this a “European Fair” was organised for that date in Merrion Square along with events in ten other towns and cities in Ireland.

A weekend of protest against the summit, called the "No Borders" weekend, was organised by the Dublin Grassroots Network (DGN). The group was a “broad-based network including anarchists, environmentalists, anti-war activists.” The two defining characteristics of DGN were the advocacy of non-hierarchical organisation and an insistence on the importance of direct action. Many of those involved were veterans of the alter-globalisation movement. They had organised the 2002 and 2003 Mayday Reclaim the Streets parties in Dublin which had “established Mayday in the public mind as, at least partially, a day of libertarian protest”.

Amongst the events planned by DGN for the weekend were street theatre performances and a bicycle rally. For the time of the Farmleigh summit itself, a "Bring the Noise" march from the city centre to Farmleigh was planned. The organisers urged marchers to bring "saucepan lids and spoons, pots and pans, whistles and kazoos, sound systems and foghorns, musical instruments, drums and any other noise-making instruments you can get your hands on”. The organisers were aware that there was no chance that any march was going to be allowed get within sight of the EU leaders, but hoped that this approach they “might get close enough to at least be heard”.

DGN media spokespeople stressed that they planned the march to be non-confrontational and that they didn't intend to try to break through police lines or damage property. It was known that some of those who intended on going on the protest, particularly some international visitors, opposed this approach. It was agreed that anyone who wanted to go beyond the guidelines drawn up by the organisers should do so away from the main march.

Prior to the day of the summit it was alleged by figures in the government and in the media that the reason for the protest was opposition to the enlargement of the European Union. DGN spokespeople responded that they were not against EU expansion. Rather, they were against ‘Fortress Europe’ policies, the increased militarization of the EU, unfair taxation and the privatisation of basic public services. Prior to the protest, the organisers made contact with refugee groups, the anti-bin tax campaign, other groups and campaigns as well as international left-libertarian groups such as the WOMBLES.

== Media reporting pre-protest ==
There was extensive media coverage of the planned protest for several months prior to the event. Much of this was sensationalist in nature, playing up the threat of violence from anarchists, particularly those coming from abroad. There were claims that over 15,000 protestors would arrive from abroad for the demonstration, including many ‘veterans’ of the Genoa G8 riots. Irish journalist Harry Brown wrote that the run up to May Day 2004 saw ‘some of the most atrocious journalism in living memory’. Aisling Reidy of the Irish Council for Civil Liberties expressed her concern that the Gardaí were trying to ‘soften up’ public opinion for a confrontation that weekend through stories fed to the media.

Newspaper headlines from the time include ‘Anarchist army plans bloodbath in Ireland’ or ‘Anarchists to gas 10,000 people’. Ireland on Sunday claimed that anarchists had stockpiled weapons at secret locations throughout the country. The Sunday Business Post carried a warning on 25 April from a police source that there was a plan to attack the Blanchardstown Shopping Centre. Another paper claimed there was a plan to assassinate the Taoiseach, Bertie Ahern. In one notorious incident Darren Boyle of the Irish Daily Star claimed to have “infiltrated” a secret meeting of anarchists. In fact, the meeting that he attended was open and publicly advertised.

== Security preparation ==
In response to the planned protests, the Gardaí “mounted one of the biggest security operations ever seen in the State”. Immigration checks were strengthened at airports and ports. The owners of student hostels and other accommodation popular with backpackers were warned to be on the lookout for visitors acting suspiciously. A wing of a Dublin prison was emptied in readiness. Senior Gardaí claimed that they would not have room to room to detain all those arrested and would have to take over schools and universities. Hospitals were told to have their emergency contingents ready in cases of serious civil unrest. Space was cleared at the city morgue.

Police visited city centre businesses and encouraged them to close for the weekend, warning of serious violence. The summit's location was marked off by a four-mile exclusion zone. Between 4,000 and 6,000 officers were deployed on summit-related duties for that weekend, with 1,000 in riots squads. Over 2,500 soldiers were also deployed, with the army's chemical, biological, radiological and nuclear unit put on stand-by. All Garda leave for the weekend was cancelled. Two water cannons were borrowed from the PSNI for the occasion.

Two days before the protest a squat that was to serve as an accommodation centre for the protestors was shut down by police. Three English anarchists were also arrested. On the same day, police announced that the riot squad would be deployed at the march's starting point and would break up any attempts at assembling. DGN chose a new starting point but one writer has said that the city was essentially under martial law by that point. Ealáir ní Dhorchaigh and Laurence Cox writing in 2011 in the book Riotous Assemblies: Rebels, Riots and Revolts in Ireland, said that the effect of this massive security operation was to produce a “frightened, silent and militarised city”.

== March ==
The ‘No Borders’ protest weekend began on the morning of Friday 30 April with a demonstration outside Mountjoy Prison in support of the English arrestees. This was followed by a Critical Mass event that evening. On Saturday morning there was a series of street theatre pieces against Fortress Europe, followed by a break-in into the privately owned Fitzwilliam Park.

The Bring the Noise march began on O’Connell Street at 6pm on Saturday. Far more people arrived than the organisers expected. Assembling under the Jim Larkin a statue a proposal was put to the crowd about whether they should march to Farmleigh, despite the Garda ban. This was assented to and the march out of the city centre began. The front banner of the march read ‘No border, no nations; Against a Europe of capital’.

A couple of minor scuffles broke out early in the march between journalists and more militant marchers. The van of RTÉ, the state broadcaster, was spray painted with the word ‘liars’. Despite this the mood was generally good. DGN activists Andrew Flood and Dec McCarthy, writing about the events afterwards, spoke of a carnival atmosphere.

After walking for about 9 km, the group made it to the Ashtown roundabout at about 8pm, where police had blocked the way to the Ashtown Gate into the Phoenix Park. There between 2,000 – 5,000 demonstrators present at this point. The march stopped on the Navan Road, about 100 metres from the roundabout. At this point a ‘pushing bloc’ broke away from the main march and advanced up to police lines, along with some others.

At this point, the uniformed police retreated and were replaced by riot squads. The pushing bloc attempted to break through police lines but this was only a token effort. They also threw missiles such as beer cans, sticks and placards at the gardaí. Baton charges were deployed against the protestors to force them back. After a number of charges the water cannons were deployed. The prompted a sit-down protest but the protestors were soon driven back. The gardaí continued the advance with further baton charges and the protestors started to retreat back to the city centre.

Overall 29 demonstrators were arrested. Several people were injured in the clashes, including one police officer who was taken to hospital with a head injury. The summit in Farmleigh went ahead as planned.

== Aftermath ==
The ‘No Borders’ weekend did not end with the clashes in Ashtown. Early on Sunday about dozen people held a demonstration outside an accommodation centre for asylum seekers in protest against the government's recently announced ‘direct provision’ policy. On Monday there was another demonstration outside Mountjoy, followed by a Reclaim the Streets party that passed without incident.

The government defended the actions of the gardaí following the incident. Speaking in Dáil Éireann on May 5 leader of the opposition Enda Kenny praised the government saying that they “had an obligation to ensure the security and safety of our citizens and visitors from Europe.” Joe Higgins of the Socialist Party was more critical. Speaking in the same Dáil session he criticised the police for heavy-handedness during the protest and for their treatment of those arrested. He accused the media of fearmongering and criticised the government for ordering the water cannons.

DGN blamed policing decisions for the outbreak of violence. In a statement released on May 7 they accused the government of trying to “criminalise protest and prevent the exercise of democratic rights”. In the statement they alleged that this was done to prevent embarrassment to the government and to intimidate potential protestors ahead of US President George W Bush's upcoming visit. They criticised both the arrests and the treatment of those arrested, who were denied bail.

Writing in 2010 DGN activist Mark Malone called the No Borders weekend “the biggest anti-authoritarian event in the history of the State”. Reflecting on the weekend in a 2021 interview DGN media spokesperson Aileen O'Carroll said that it more of a "moment of exuberance" than something that had a long-term impact.

=== Involvement of Mark Kennedy ===
Amongst those involved in the attempt to push through police lines was Mark Kennedy. Kennedy is a former London Metropolitan Police officer who first came to public attention in 2010 when it was revealed that he had entered into intimate relationships with environmental activists while working infiltrating them under the alias ‘Mark Stone’. It has been alleged that he acted as an agent provocateur during numerous campaigns. Witnesses at the May Day confrontation have said that Kennedy acted aggressively and encouraged other activists to attack gardaí.

In 2011 Garda officers confirmed that they had been alerted by British police in advance that Kennedy had sought to come over for the protest. The officers said that this was accepted this provided that Kennedy did not break any laws. They further said that he did not work for gardaí while based in Ireland and did not have any communication with the force about his activities. Following the revelations Labour Party TD, and future President of Ireland, Michael D. Higgins demanded an explanation from the British government as to why one of its undercover police officers was operating in Ireland.

== See also ==
- Anarchism in Ireland
- List of demonstrations against corporate globalization
