= List of public inquiries in the United Kingdom =

In the United Kingdom, the term public inquiry, also known as a tribunal of inquiry, refers to either statutory or non-statutory inquiries that have been established either previously by the monarch or by government ministers of the United Kingdom, Scottish, Northern Irish and Welsh governments to investigate either specific, controversial events or policy proposals. Non-statutory public inquiries are often used in order to investigate controversial events of national concern, the advantage being that they are more flexible than the statutory inquiry as they do not need to follow the requirements of the Inquiries Act 2005, The Inquiry Rules 2006 (UK, excluding Scotland) and The Inquiries (Scotland) Rules 2007. Statutory inquiries can be held as subject-specific public inquiries, however most are now held under the Inquiries Act 2005 which repealed the Tribunals of Inquiry (Evidence) Act 1921. Statutory public inquiries, unlike non-statutory inquiries, have legal powers to compel witnesses. This list excludes Public Local Inquiries (which encompasses Planning Inquiries, Compulsory Purchase Order Inquiries, Listed Building Inquiries etc.)

Only United Kingdom government ministers can establish public inquiries, set their terms of reference, and appoint the chair. The UK Government considers that the main purpose of public inquiries is in "preventing recurrence". Between 1990 and 2017 UK governments spent at least £630m on public inquiries, with most expensive being the Bloody Sunday Inquiry costing £210.6 million. Most public inquiries take about two years to complete their work. Of the 69 inquiries launched between 1990 and 2017, the Hammond Inquiry into ministerial conduct relating to the Hinduja affair in 2001 was the shortest, taking just 45 days to report its findings; the Inquiry into Hyponatraemia-related Deaths in Northern Ireland was the longest, taking 13 years and three months.

In September 2024 the House of Lords Statutory Inquiries Committee called for a change in the way public inquiries are set up and conducted. In their report, Public Inquiries: Enhancing Public Trust, it called for "significant improvements to the inquiry system, to make them more efficient and effective and to avoid the costly and wasteful process of inquiries 'reinventing the wheel'". The report recommended:

- A timescale for inquiries, to avoid unnecessary and excessive costs
- A newly created Parliamentary Public Inquiries Committee to monitor and report on the steps being taken to implement inquiry recommendations
- A publicly-accessible online tracker showing how, and when, inquiry recommendations have been put in place
- More inquiries could be led by an expert, or panel of experts, rather than reliance on a judge – and more consideration be given to making some of them non-statutory
- The Inquiries Unit of the Cabinet Office be strengthened to ensure "best practice" is shared between inquiries, including on how best to involve victims and survivors
- Lengthy public inquiries produce interim reports, and others provide regular public updates
- Victims and survivors should be consulted where appropriate on an inquiry's scope.

== Types of public inquiry ==
There are two types of public inquiry, the statutory inquiry and the non-statutory inquiry. Statutory public inquiries are led by a panel of professional people with a chairperson, who are often judges, or a lord, professor, senior civil servant, scientist, doctor or engineer. The big difference between the two types of public inquiries is that the non-statutory inquiry cannot compel witnesses to either give evidence under oath or to produce evidence relevant to the inquiry.

There are a range of types of non-statutory inquiries, but they primarily fall into three groups:

- 'Ad-hoc' public inquiries;
- Committees of privy counsellors;
- Royal Commissions

A range of terms may be used for these inquiries, including describing them as "independent reviews" or "independent panels", but not all such panels or reviews are considered to constitute public inquiries.

Public inquiries in the UK have historically been widely used, especially royal commissions. Royal commissions were used so that the monarch could obtain advice and inquire into matters and misconduct outside of institutions, such as parliament. The first royal commission goes back to William the Conqueror in the 11th century, when he nominated an inquiry to produce the Domesday Book of land ownership. Royal commissions were later appointed by governments to obtain expert advice on subjects such as health, education, labour reform, public administration, welfare and factory legislation. Royal commissions became less common in the 1980s, and no new commission has been formed since 1999.

=== Subject-specific public inquiries ===
Subject-specific public inquiries are sections held within other acts of Parliament which also have the powers of statutory public inquiries, these include;

- section 3 of the Children Act 2004, carried out by the Children's Commissioner,
- section 14 of the Health and Safety at Work etc. Act 1974, and before that the Offshore Installations (Public Inquiries) Regulations 1974,
- sections 68–72 of the Financial Services Act 2012,
- the Merchant Shipping Act 1995,
- regulation 16(13) of the Civil Aviation (Investigation of Accidents) Regulations 1969, and
- schedule 1 of the Coroners and Justice Act 2009, which enables non-statutory inquests to be converted into statutory inquiries under the Inquiries Act 2005.

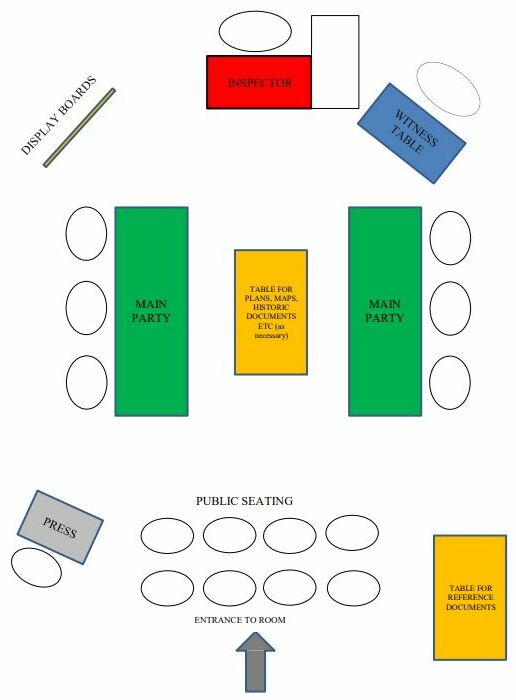
Suggested Layout of a Planning Inspectorate Inquiry room

=== Public local inquiries ===
A public local inquiry is an inquiry led by the independent Planning Inspectorate, for various local issues involving a local planning authority. They follow formal rules and procedures, and they could include a planning application which has been refused permission, in which case it is called a Planning Inquiry, or an appeal against a compulsory purchase order, which are called a Compulsory Purchase Order Inquiry, or listed building consent appeals, which are called a Listed Building Inquiry. These types of inquiries may last for up to several days, or even weeks. Inquiries are usually held in local planning authority offices, village halls or community centres. One example of a Public Local Inquiry was the inquiry into the M4 Corridor around Newport Project in Wales, which followed The Highways (Inquiries Procedure) Rules 1994 and The Compulsory Purchase (Inquiries Procedure) (Wales) Rules 2010. This list excludes public local inquiries due to the numerous inquiries involved.

==== The rules for public local inquiries throughout the United Kingdom ====
- The Drought Orders (Inquiries Procedure) Rules 1984
- The Highways (Inquiries Procedure) Rules 1994
- The Public Libraries (Inquiries Procedure) Rules 1992
- The Road Humps (Secretary of State) (Inquiries Procedure) Rules 1986

==== The rules for public local inquiries in England and Wales ====
- The Town and Country Planning (Inquiries Procedure) (England) Rules 2000
- The Rights of Way (Hearings and Inquiries Procedure) (England) Rules 2007
- The Electricity Generating Stations and Overhead Lines (Inquiries Procedure) (England and Wales) Rules 2007
- The Transport and Works (Inquiries Procedure) Rules 2004
- The Pipe-lines (Inquiries Procedure) Rules 1995
- The Town and Country Planning (Inquiries Procedure) (Wales) Rules 2003
- The Compulsory Purchase (Inquiries Procedure) Rules 2007
- The Compulsory Purchase (Inquiries Procedure) (Wales) Rules 2010
- The Electricity (Offshore Generating Stations) (Inquiries Procedure) (Wales) Regulations 2019

==== The rules for public local inquiries in Scotland ====
- The Town and Country Planning (Inquiries Procedure) (Scotland) Rules 1997
- The Compulsory Purchase by Public Authorities (Inquiries Procedure) (Scotland) Rules 1998
- The Fatal Accidents and Sudden Deaths Inquiry Procedure (Scotland) Rules 1977
- The Transport and Works (Scotland) Act 2007 (Inquiries and Hearings Procedure) Rules 2007

==== The rules for public local inquiries in Northern Ireland ====
- The Health and Safety Inquiries (Procedure) Regulations (Northern Ireland) 1980
- Planning (Inquiry Procedure) Rules (Northern Ireland) 2015
- The Agricultural Marketing (Public Inquiry) Regulations (Northern Ireland) 1984

== Statutory public inquiries ==
Statutory public inquiries, unlike non-statutory inquiries, have legal powers to compel witnesses.

=== Public inquiries under the Inquiries Act 2005 ===
==== Current public inquiries ====
As of July 2025:

Inquiry name	Administration/ department	Chaired by	Announcement date	Website	Reason for inquiry and general notes
Scottish Child Abuse Inquiry	Scottish Government	Lady Smith	17 December 2014	childabuseinquiry.scot	To investigate the abuse of children in care in Scotland.
Undercover Policing Inquiry	Home Office	Sir John Mitting	12 March 2015	ucpi.org.uk	To investigate undercover policing and to provide recommendations for the future
Sheku Bayoh Inquiry	Scottish Government	Lord Bracadale	12 November 2019	shekubayohinquiry.scot	To investigate the events surrounding the death of Sheku Bayoh, the subsequent investigation and whether race was a factor
Scottish Hospitals Inquiry	Scottish Government	Lord Brodie	3 August 2020	hospitalsinquiry.scot	To investigate the construction of the Queen Elizabeth University Hospital Campus, Glasgow, and the Royal Hospital for Children and Young People, and Department of Clinical Neurosciences, Edinburgh.
Muckamore Abbey Hospital Inquiry	Northern Ireland Executive	Tom Kark KC	8 September 2020	mahinquiry.org.uk	To investigate the issue of abuse of patients at Muckamore Abbey Hospital and to determine why the abuse happened and the range of circumstances that allowed it to happen.
UK Covid-19 Inquiry	Office of Prime Minister	Baroness Hallett	12 May 2021	covid19.public-inquiry.uk	The inquiry is set to "examine the UK's response to and impact of the Covid-19 pandemic, and learn lessons for the future".
Post Office Horizon IT Inquiry	BEIS	Sir Wyn Williams	19 May 2021	postofficehorizoninquiry.org.uk	To gather a clear account of the implementation and failings of the Horizon IT system at the Post Office over its lifetime.
Scottish Covid-19 Inquiry	Scottish Government	Lord Brailsford	24 August 2021	covid19inquiry.scot	To investigate the Covid-19 pandemic in Scotland and establish the facts about the devolved response to the Covid-19 pandemic.
Dawn Sturgess Inquiry	Home Office	Lord Hughes of Ombersley	18 November 2021	dawnsturgess.independent-inquiry.uk	To investigate the circumstances of the death of Dawn Sturgess in the 2018 Wiltshire Novichok poisonings
Lampard Inquiry, previously the non-statutory Essex Mental Health Independent Inquiry (EMHII)	Department of Health and Social Care	Baroness Kate Lampard	1 November 2023 (Lampard Inquiry); 4 February 2022 (EMHII).	lampardinquiry.org.uk/ previously emhii.org.uk	To investigate the deaths of mental health inpatients in Essex between 2000 and 2020. It was announced on 28 June 2023 that the Inquiry would be granted statutory status under the Inquiries Act 2005. The inquiry was re-launched as the Lampard Inquiry on 1 November 2023. Previously it had been a non-statutory 'ad-hoc' public inquiry.
Omagh Bombing Inquiry	Northern Ireland Office	Lord Turnbull	9 February 2023	omagh.independent-inquiry.uk/	To investigate whether the Omagh bombing could have been prevented by the UK state authorities. Given the sensitive nature of the materials involved, the Inquiry Chairman may choose to hold some proceedings privately and publish public and closed reports.
Independent Inquiry relating to Afghanistan	Ministry of Defence	Lord Justice Haddon-Cave	22 March 2023	iia.independent-inquiry.uk/	To investigate the "deliberate detention operations" conducted by the British armed forces in Afghanistan between the period of mid-2010 to mid-2013. To determine whether any of the circumstances around any unlawful killings were covered up at any stage.
Thirlwall Inquiry	Department of Health and Social Care	Lady Kathryn Thirlwall	30 August 2023	thirlwall.public-inquiry.uk/	To examine the events at Countess of Chester Hospital and their implications following the conviction of Lucy Letby of murder and attempted murder of babies at the hospital. The inquiry will not review the jury's verdicts and will make no findings regarding civil proceedings.
The Eljamel and NHS Tayside Public Inquiry	Scottish Government	Lord Weir	7 September 2023	eljamelinquiry.scot/	To examine a number of failings at NHS Tayside, which found that concerns about Professor Sam Eljamel were not acted upon with the urgency they deserved.
Death of Jalal Uddin Inquiry	Home Office	Judge Thomas Teague	9 November 2023	jalaluddin.public-inquiry.uk	To determine how, when and where Mr Uddin died.
Emma Caldwell Inquiry	Scottish Government	Lord Scott	7 March 2024	https://www.emmacaldwellinquiry.scot/	To review the investigation of Emma Caldwell's murder including to understand what went wrong, to ensure lessons are learned for the future and to provide answers to the victims and survivors involved. The inquiry will be statutory and will be judge-led though more details will be published once legal proceedings have concluded.
Pat Finucane Inquiry	Northern Ireland Office	Sir Gary Hickinbottom	11 September 2024	https://finucane.independent-inquiry.uk	To examime the 1989 murder of Belfast solicitor Pat Finucane amid allegations of state collusion in his killing.
The Nottingham Inquiry	Home Office	Deborah Taylor	12 February 2025	https://nottingham.independent-inquiry.uk/	To build a clear understanding of the events, acts and omissions that led up to Valdo Calocane's attacks in Nottingham in June 2023.
Southport Inquiry	Home Office	Sir Adrian Fulford	7 April 2025	https://www.southport.public-inquiry.uk/	To examine the circumstances surrounding Axel Rudakubana's attack in Southport in 2024 and the events leading up to it.
Independent Commission on Grooming Gangs	TBC	TBC	16 June 2025	TBC	To co-ordinate a series of targeted local investigations.
Inquiry into the battle of Orgreave	Home Office	The Rt Revd Dr Pete Wilcox, the Bishop of Sheffield	21 July 2025	https://www.orgreave.public-inquiry.uk/	To aid public understanding of how the violent clashes and injuries caused at Orgreave on 18 June 1984, and the events immediately after, came to pass.

==== Former public inquiries ====
Inquiry name	Administration	Chaired by	Start date	Report date	Final report	Reason for inquiry
The Billy Wright Inquiry	UK Government	Lord Ranald McLean	23 November 2005	14 September 2010	PDF	To investigate whether the state facilitated, or attempted to facilitate, Billy Wright's death, whether acts or omissions by the state were "intentional or negligent", and "to make recommendations".
The Robert Hamill Inquiry	UK Government	Sir Edwin Jowitt	16 November 2004	29 January 2010	Web (Unpublished)	To investigate into the death of Robert Hamill with a view to determining whether any wrongful act or omission by or within the Royal Ulster Constabulary facilitated his death or obstructed the investigation of it, or whether attempts were made to do so.
Public Inquiry into the E.coli O157 outbreak in South Wales	Welsh Government	Professor Hugh Pennington	13 March 2006	19 March 2009	PDF	"The circumstances that led to the outbreak of E.coli O157 infection in South Wales in September 2005, and into the handling of the outbreak; and to consider the implications for the future and make recommendations accordingly"
The ICL Inquiry	UK and Scottish Governments	Lord Gill	21 November 2008	16 July 2009	PDF	To investigate into the explosion that occurred on 11 May 2004 at the ICL plastics factory, Maryhill, Glasgow.
Inquiry into the circumstances of the Death of Bernard (Sonny) Lodge	UK Government	Barbara Stow	23 February 2009	15 December 2009	PDF	To investigate the circumstances of the death of Bernard (Sonny) Lodge
Baha Mousa Inquiry	UK Government	Sir William Gage	14 May 2008	8 September 2011	Web	To investigate the circumstances of the death of Baha Mousa
Fingerprint Inquiry	Scottish Government	Sir Anthony Campbell	14 March 2008	14 December 2011	PDF	"The steps taken to verify the fingerprints associated with the case of the Lord Advocate v Shirley McKie in 1999, and related matters"
The Penrose Inquiry	Scottish Government	Lord Penrose	23 April 2008	26 March 2015	PDF	To investigate hepatitis C and HIV infections from NHS Scotland treatment caused by contaminated blood or blood products.
Public Inquiry into the Outbreak of Clostridioides difficile in Northern Trust Hospitals	Northern Ireland Executive	Dame Deirdre Hine	14 October 2008	21 March 2011	Web	To investigate the outbreak of Clostridioides difficile in five hospitals of the Northern Health and Social Care Trust that took place in 2007/8.
Vale of Leven Hospital Inquiry (Clostridioides difficile)	Scottish Government	Lord Ranald McLean	22 April 2009	24 November 2014	PDF	To investigate the occurrence of Clostridioides difficile infection at the Vale of Leven Hospital
Al-Sweady Inquiry	UK Government	Sir Thayne Forbes	25 November 2009	17 December 2014	Web	To investigate allegations of unlawful killing and ill treatment of Iraqi nationals by British troops in Iraq in 2004.
Azelle Rodney Inquiry	UK Government	Sir Christopher Holland	10 June 2010	5 July 2013	Web	To investigate the circumstances of the death of Azelle Rodney.
Mid Staffordshire NHS Foundation Trust Public Inquiry. (Note: There have been two public inquiries regarding the Mid Staffordshire NHS Foundation Trust, in 2010 (a non-statutory 'ad-hoc' public inquiry) and 2013 (a statutory public inquiry under the Inquiries Act 2005) with the same chair)	UK Government	Sir Robert Francis	9 June 2010	6 February 2013	Web	To investigate into the serious failings at the Mid Staffordshire NHS Foundation Trust.
The Leveson Inquiry	UK Government	Sir Brian Leveson	13 July 2011	29 November 2012	Web	An inquiry "into the culture, practices and ethics of the press" in light of the issues surrounding the News International phone hacking scandal
The Litvinenko Inquiry	UK Government	Sir Robert Owen	22 July 2014	21 January 2016	PDF	To investigate into the death of Alexander Litvinenko.
The Anthony Grainger Inquiry	UK Government	Thomas Teague	17 March 2016	12 July 2019	PDF	To investigate the circumstances of the death of Anthony Grainger.
Renewable Heat Incentive Inquiry	Northern Ireland Executive	Sir Patrick Coghlin	24 January 2017	13 March 2020	Web	To investigate the development and performance of the Northern Ireland Non-Domestic Renewable Heat Incentive Scheme (the NI RHI scheme).
The Jermaine Baker Public Inquiry	Home Office	Clement Goldstone	12 February 2020	5 July 2022	PDF	To investigate the death of Jermaine Baker in 2015.
Independent Inquiry into Child Sexual Abuse	Home Office	Alexis Jay	4 February 2015	20 October 2022	PDF	To investigate serious concerns that some organisations had failed and were continuing to fail to protect children from sexual abuse.
Manchester Arena Inquiry	Home Office	Sir John Saunders	22 October 2019	8 June 2023	Web	To investigate the deaths of the victims of the 2017 Manchester Arena attack. The inquiry followed the Kerslake Report which was chaired by Lord Bob Kerslake and was published on 27 March 2018. The Report was "an independent review into the preparedness for, and emergency response to, the Manchester Arena attack on 22nd May 2017."
Edinburgh Tram Inquiry	Scottish Government	Lord Hardie	5 June 2014	19 September 2023	PDF	To investigate why the Edinburgh Tram project incurred delays, cost more than originally budgeted and through reductions in scope delivered significantly less than projected.
Infected Blood Inquiry	Cabinet Office	Sir Brian Langstaff	3 November 2017	20 May 2024	Web	To investigate the circumstances in which men, women and children treated by National Health Services in the United Kingdom were given infected blood and infected blood products, in particular since 1970.
Grenfell Tower Inquiry	Office of Prime Minister	Sir Martin Moore-Bick	15 June 2017	4 September 2024	Web	To establish the facts of what happened at Grenfell Tower to prevent it happening again.
Brook House Inquiry	Home Office	Kate Eves	5 November 2019	19 September 2023	Web	To investigate the mistreatment of individuals who were detained at Brook House Immigration Removal Centre in 2017|

=== Public inquiries under the Tribunals of Inquiry (Evidence) Act 1921 ===
Inquiry name	Members of Tribunal	Year	Reason for inquiry and final report where available
Destruction of Documents by Ministry of Munitions Officials	Lord Cave, Lord Inchcape, Sir William Pender	1921	To inquire into allegations that certain officials, including a highly ranked one, at the Ministry of Munitions had ordered the destruction of documents in order to prevent inspection by auditors
Royal Commission on Lunacy and Mental Disorder	Lord Macmillan	1924	Report
Arrest Of Major Sheppard (Public Inquiry)	John Rawlinson	1925	A public inquiry into the arrest of Major R.C. Sheppard
Kilmarnock Police Inquiry	William Lyon Mackenzie	1925	Allegations made against the Chief Constable of Kilmarnock
Doncaster Drainage Commission	Sir Horace Cecil Monro	1926–28	Inquiry into the conditions with regard to mining and drainage in an area around the County Borough of Doncaster
Charges against the Chief Constable of St Helens by the Watch Committee aka The St. Helens Tribunal of Inquiry	C Parry, Thomas Hollis Walker	1928	To investigate the complaint that has arisen between the Watch Committee of St. Helens and the Chief Constable of the Borough Police Force touching the administration of the Force.
Savidge Inquiry	Sir John Eldon Bankes, Hastings Lees-Smith, John Withers	1928	Tribunal inquiry into the interrogation Miss Irene Savidge by the Metropolitan Police at New Scotland Yard
Glasgow Inquiry	Lord Anderson, Sir R Boothby, J Hunter	1933	Allegations of bribery and corruption in connection with the letting and allocation of stances and other premises under the control of the Corporation of Glasgow
Budget Leak Tribunal	Sir J Porter, J Simonds, R Oliver	1936	Inquiry into the unauthorised disclosure of information relating to the Budget
Tribunal of Inquiry into the loss of H.M. Submarine Thetis	Sir Alfred Townsend Bucknill	1939	Final report
The conduct before the Hereford Juvenile Court Justices of the proceedings against Craddock and others	Lord Goddard	1943	To investigate the conduct before the Hereford Juvenile Court Justices of the proceedings against Craddock and others
Newcastle upon Tyne Inquiry	Roland Burrows	1944	To investigate the administration of Newcastle-upon-Tyne Fire, Police and Civil Defence Services
Lynskey Tribunal	Sir J Lynskey, Russell Vick, Gerald Upjohn	1948	Bribery of Ministers of the Crown or other public servants in connection with the grant of licences, etc.
Bank Rate Tribunal	Lord Parker, Sir Milner Holland, G. de P. Veale	1957	Allegations of the improper disclosure of information relating to the raising of bank rate
Waters Tribunal	Lord Sorn, Sir James Robertson	1959	Allegations that John Waters was assaulted by police officers on 7 December 1957, at Thurso and the action taken by the Caithness Police in connection therewith
Vassall Tribunal	Lord Radcliffe, Sir John Barry, Sir Milner Holland	1962	The circumstances in which offences under the Official Secrets Act were committed by John Vassall
Aberfan Disaster Tribunal	Lord Edmund-Davies	1967	Circumstances relating to the Aberfan disaster Final report
The events on Sunday 30 January 1972 which led to the loss of life in connection with the procession in Derry that day (Widgery Tribunal) (Note: There have been two public inquiries under the Tribunals of Inquiry (Evidence) Act 1921 regarding Bloody Sunday, in 1972 (the Widgery Report) and 2010 (the Saville Report))	Lord Widgery	1972	The first Bloody Sunday inquiry into the shootings on Bloody Sunday. Summary of the Widgery Report
The circumstances leading to the cessation of trading by the Vehicle and General Insurance Company Limited	Sir A James, M Kerr, S Templeman	1971	Inquiry into the collapse of the Vehicle and General Insurance Company
Crown Agents Tribunal	Sir David Croom-Johnson	1982	To investigate the conduct of the Crown Agents for Overseas Governments and Administrations between 1967 and 1974.
The second Cullen Inquiry into the Shootings at Dunblane Primary School	Lord Cullen	30 September 1996	To investigate into the incident at Dunblane Primary School on Wednesday 13 March 1996, which resulted in the deaths of 18 people. Final report
Bloody Sunday Inquiry (Saville Inquiry)	Lord Saville	2000–2010	The second Bloody Sunday inquiry into the shootings on Bloody Sunday. To investigate 'the events of Sunday, 30 January 1972 which led to loss of life in connection with the procession in Londonderry on that day, taking account of any new information relevant to events on that day'. The Saville Report
The Shipman Inquiry	Dame Janet Smith	2000–2005	An investigation into the issues surrounding the case of mass murderer Harold Shipman. Final report

=== Public inquiries under subject-specific legislation ===
Inquiry name	Act of Parliament	Chaired by	Start date	End date	Final report	Reason for inquiry
Tay Bridge Disaster Public Inquiry	Regulation of Railways Act 1871 (34 & 35 Vict. c. 78), s. 7	Henry Cadogan Rothery	31 December 1879	30 June 1880	PDF	The fall of the Tay bridge on 28 December 1879. An express train was lost as the bridge fell, killing 75 people.
Lane Inquiry	Civil Aviation (Investigation of Accidents) Regulations 1969	Mr Justice Lane	20 November 1972	14 April 1973	PDF	Investigation into the causes and circumstances of the accident near Staines on 18 June 1972
The Sizewell B Inquiry (Layfield Inquiry)	Electric Lighting Act 1909 (9 Edw. 7. c. 34), s. 2 and the Electricity Generating Stations and Overhead Lines (Inquiries Procedure) Rules 1981 (SI 1981/1841)	Sir Frank Layfield	11 January 1983	13 January 1987	Not available	A proposal by the Central Electricity Generating Board to construct a pressurized water reactor nuclear power station at Sizewell, Suffolk.
King's Cross Underground Fire Inquiry	Regulation of Railways Act 1871 (34 & 35 Vict. c. 78), s. 7	Desmond Fennell	February 1988	June 1988	Web	To investigate the circumstances into the King's Cross Underground fire.
Clapham Junction Railway Accident inquiry	Regulation of Railways Act 1871 (34 & 35 Vict. c. 78), s. 7	Anthony Hidden	December 1988	November 1989	PDF	To investigate the circumstances into the Clapham Junction rail crash.
The first Cullen Report into the Piper Alpha Disaster	Offshore Installations (Public Inquiries) Regulations 1974 (SI 1974/338)	Lord Cullen	November 1988	November 1990	Vol 1, Vol 2	The inquiry into the Piper Alpha disaster of 6 July 1988
Investigation into the flotation of Mirror Group Newspapers plc.	Companies Act 1985 (c. 6), s. 432(2) and s. 442	Sir Roger Thomas, Raymond Turner	June 1992	March 2001	Not available	To investigate the affairs of Mirror Group Newspapers
The Allitt Inquiry	National Health Service Act 1977 (c. 49), s. 2	Sir Cecil Clothier	May 1993	February 1994	Not available	The circumstances surrounding the murder by Beverly Allitt of four children and the injuring of nine others in the children's ward of Grantham and Kesteven general hospital in 1991.
Ashworth Special Hospital Inquiry	National Health Service Act 1977 (c. 49), s. 84	Peter Fallon	February 1997	January 1999	PDF	To investigate the functioning of the Personality Disorder Unit at Ashworth Hospital
Stephen Lawrence Inquiry	Police Act 1996 (c. 16), s. 49	William MacPherson	July 1997	February 1999	PDF	Matters arising from the death of Stephen Lawrence on 22 April 1993 to date
Southall Rail Accident Inquiry	Health and Safety at Work etc. Act 1974 (c. 37), s. 14(2)(b)	Professor John Uff	February 1998	February 2000	PDF	Why the Southall rail accident happened, and in particular to ascertain the cause or causes
Bristol Royal Infirmary Inquiry	National Health Service Act 1977 (c. 49), s. 84	Professor Sir Ian Kennedy	October 1998	July 2001	Web	To investigate into children's heart surgery at the Bristol Royal Infirmary between 1984 and 1995.
Royal Liverpool Children's Hospital Inquiry	National Health Service Act 1977 (c. 49), s. 2	Michael Redfern	February 2000	January 2001	PDF	To inquire into the circumstances leading to the removal, retention and disposal of human tissue, including organs and body parts, from children at the Royal Liverpool Children's NHS Trust
MV Derbyshire Inquiry	Merchant Shipping Act 1995 (c. 21), s. 269	Justice Colman	April 2000	November 2000	Web	Cause of the sinking of the Derbyshire in September 1980
The third Cullen Report into Ladbroke Grove rail crash (Ladbroke Grove Rail Inquiry)	Health and Safety at Work etc. Act 1974 (c. 37)	Lord Cullen	May 2000	September 2001	Part 1 Part 2	To investigate the crash at Ladbroke Grove Junction on 5 October 1999 between trains operated by Thames Trains and First Great Western, which caused considerable loss of life and injuries.
The Southall and Ladbroke Grove Joint Inquiry into Train Protection Systems etc.	Health and Safety at Work etc. Act 1974 (c. 37), s. 14(2)(b)	Lord Cullen and Professor John Uff	September 2000	March 2001	Not available	Investigate questions relating to train protection systems due to the Southall Rail Accident Inquiry and the Ladbroke Grove Rail Inquiry. To consider the train protection and warning systems; future application of Automatic Train Protection Systems and SPAD prevention measures.
Marchioness Inquiry	Merchant Shipping Act 1995 (c. 21), s. 268	Lord Justice Clarke	October 2000	March 2001	Web	To investigate the collision between aggregates dredger Bowbelle and passenger vessel Marchioness resulting in Marchioness sinking with loss of 51 lives
Victoria Climbié Inquiry	Children Act 1989 (c. 41), s. 81, Police Act 1996 (c. 16), s. 49, National Health Service Act 1977 (c. 49), s. 84.	Lord Laming	May 2001	January 2003	PDF	To investigate the death of Victoria Climbié
"The Three Inquiries" (Ayling, Neale, Kerr/Haslam).	National Health Service Act 1977 (c. 49), s. 84	Anna Pauffley, Suzan Matthews and Nigel Pleming	April 2003	July 2004	PDF	To assess the appropriateness and effectiveness of the procedures operated in the local health services
FV Gaul Inquiry	Merchant Shipping Act 1995 (c. 21), s. 269	Mr Justice David Steel	January 2004	December 2004	PDF	To investigate an underwater survey of the wreck of the FV Gaul and report on its findings.
The Rosemary Nelson Inquiry	Police (Northern Ireland) Act 1998 (c. 32), s. 44	Sir Michael Morland	November 2004	May 2011	PDF	To investigate the circumstances surrounding the murder of Rosemary Nelson in 1999.
FV Trident Inquiry	Merchant Shipping Act 1995 (c. 21), s. 269 and the Merchant Shipping (Formal Investigations) Rules 1985 (SI 1985/1001)	Sir Stephen Young	October 2009	February 2011	PDF	Why the Trident fishing vessel sank with the loss of seven lives in 1974.
Office of the Children's Commissioner's Inquiry into Child Sexual Exploitation in Gangs and Groups	Children Act 2004 (c. 31), s. 3	Sue Berelowitz	November 2011	November 2013	PDF	To investigate the growing concern that thousands of children in England were victims of child sexual exploitation perpetrated by gangs and groups and were not being identified and protected.
Historical Institutional Abuse Inquiry	Inquiry into Historical Institutional Abuse Act (Northern Ireland) 2013 (c. 2 (N.I.))	Sir Anthony Hart	May 2012	June 2017	Web	To examine if there were systemic failings in Northern Ireland by institutions or the state in their duties towards those children in their care between the years of 1922–1995.

== Non-statutory public inquiries ==
=== 'Ad-hoc' public inquiries ===
==== Current 'ad-hoc' public inquiries ====
As of February 2025:

Inquiry name	Administration/department	Chaired by	Announcement date	Website	Reason for inquiry
Fuller Independent Inquiry	Department of Health and Social Care	Sir Jonathan Michael	8 November 2021	fuller.independent-inquiry.uk	To investigate the issues raised by the David Fuller case. How Fuller was able to carry out inappropriate and unlawful actions in the mortuary of Maidstone and Tunbridge Wells NHS Trust and why they went apparently unnoticed.
Angiolini Inquiry	UK Government	Lady Elish Angiolini KC	22 November 2021	angiolini.independent-inquiry.uk	To investigate how Wayne Couzens, an off-duty Metropolitan police officer, was able to abduct, rape and murder Sarah Everard. The inquiry published the first part of the reports on Thursday 29 February 2024. PDF
Cranston Inquiry	UK Government	Sir Ross Cranston	11 January 2024	cranston.independent-inquiry.uk	The Inquiry will examine, consider and report on the events of 24 November 2021 when at least 27 people died attempting to cross the Channel in a small boat.
Southport public inquiry	Home Office	Sir Adrian Fulford	20 January 2025	To be announced	To review the investigation into the 2024 Southport stabbing. Home Secretary Yvette Cooper said in the House of Commons, "we are setting up an independent public inquiry. Like the Angiolini inquiry into Wayne Couzens, it will begin work on a non-statutory basis so that it can move quickly into action, but with statutory powers added later, as required. We will set out the terms of reference and appoint the chair once we have consulted the coroner".
Truth Recovery Independent Panel	Northern Ireland Executive	Professor Leanne McCormick and Professor Sean O'Connell	April 2023	independentpanel.truthrecoveryni.co.uk	The integrated truth investigation will look into the workings of Mother and Baby Institutions, Magdalene Laundries, and Workhouses in Northern Ireland, and the associated pathways and practices. It will involve two separate phases that will work together: a non-statutory Independent Panel (with no legal powers) and a full statutory Public Inquiry (with legal powers).

==== Former 'ad-hoc' public inquiries ====
Inquiry name	Chaired by	Date	Final report	Reason for inquiry
Inquiry into the State of Education in Wales 1847	James Kay-Shuttleworth	1847	Web	The alleged poor state of education in Wales and the lack of education through the medium of English
Lord Denning's Report into the Profumo Affair	Lord Denning	1963	Web	To investigate the circumstances leading to the resignation of the former Secretary of State for War, Mr J D Profumo.
Maze Prison Escape	Sir James Hennessy	1984	Web	To conduct an Inquiry into the security arrangements at HM Prison Maze, relative to the escape on Sunday 25 September 1983 and to make relevant recommendations for the improvement of security at HM Prison, Maze.
Hillsborough Stadium Disaster Inquiry	Lord Taylor	1989–90	PDF	To inquire into the events at Sheffield Wednesday Football Ground on 15 April 1989 and to make recommendations about the needs of crowd control and safety at sports events."
Inquiry into the Supervision of the Bank of Credit and Commerce International	Lord Bingham	1992	PDF	To enquire into the supervision of BCCI under the Bank Acts; and to consider whether the action taken by all the UK authorities was appropriate and timely.
Inquiry into the Export of Defence Equipment and Dual-Use Goods to Iraq and Related Prosecutions aka Scott Inquiry	Lord Scott	1996	Web	To investigate the export from the United Kingdom of defence equipment and dual use goods to Iraq between December 1984 and August 1990
E-coli Outbreak (Scotland)	Prof Hugh Pennington	1997	Web	To examine the circumstances which led to the outbreak in the central belt of Scotland and to advise on the implications for food safety and the general lessons to be learned.
Sierra Leone Arms Investigation	Sir Thomas Legg / Sir Robin Ibbs	1998	PDF	To conduct an investigation in the light of recent allegations about Government involvement with the supply of arms to Sierra Leone by UK citizens or firms with a view to establishing what was known by government officials (including military personnel) and Ministers about plans to supply arms to Sierra Leone after 8 October 1997; whether any official encouragement or approval was given to such plans or such supply; and, if so, on what authority.
The BSE Inquiry	Lord Phillips	2000	Web	To investigate the emergence of BSE and new variant CJD in the United Kingdom, and government responses to these diseases up to March 1996.
Marchioness/Bowbelle Formal Investigation	Lord Clarke	2000–01	Web	To investigate the procedures followed to establish the identity of the victims of the collision between the Bowbelle and the Marchioness.
Circumstances Surrounding an Application for Naturalisation by Mr S P Hinduja in 1998	Sir Anthony Hammond	2001	PDF	To establish what approaches were made to the Home Office in 1998 in connection with the possibility of an application for naturalisation by Mr S P Hinduja, and the full circumstances surrounding such approaches and the later grant of that application
Foot and Mouth Disease 2007: A Review and Lessons Learned	Dr Ian Anderson	2002	PDF	To investigate whether the lessons of the 2001 Foot and Mouth Disease outbreak had been learned and whether there might be new lessons and further recommendations.
Equitable Life Inquiry	Lord Penrose	2004	PDF	To enquire into the circumstances leading to the current situation of the Equitable Life Assurance Society, taking account of relevant life market background and to identify any lessons to be learnt for the conduct, administration and regulation of life assurance business.
Holyrood Inquiry	Lord Fraser	September 2004	PDF	To review the policy decisions in relation to the Holyrood Project taken prior to its transfer to the Scottish Parliamentary Corporate Body on 1 June 1999 and subsequently.
Hutton Inquiry	Lord Hutton	2004	PDF	Investigate the circumstances surrounding the death of Dr David Kelly
Inquiry into Hyponatraemia-related Deaths	John O'Hara	2019	Web	To investigate the care and treatment of Adam Strain, Lucy Crawford and Raychel Ferguson, with particular reference to the management of fluid balance and the choice and administration of intravenous fluids in each case.
The Bichard Inquiry	Sir Michael Bichard	2004	PDF	To enquire into child protection procedures in Humberside Police and Cambridgeshire Constabulary in the light of the recent trial and conviction of Ian Huntley for the murder of Jessica Chapman and Holly Wells.
The Deepcut Review	Nicholas Blake	2006	PDF	To investigate deaths at Deepcut army barracks
The Zahid Mubarek Inquiry	Sir Brian Keith	2006	PDF	to investigate and report to the Home Secretary on the murder of Zahid Mubarek, and the events leading up to the attack on him
The Mid Staffordshire NHS Foundation Trust Inquiry.	Robert Francis	2010	Vol 1 Vol 2	To give those most affected by poor care at the Mid Staffordshire NHS Foundation Trust an opportunity to tell their stories and to ensure that the lessons to be learned from those experiences 2005 to 2009.
Redfern Inquiry	Michael Redern	2010	Web	Inquiry into human tissue analysis in UK nuclear facilities
The Morecambe Bay Investigation	Bill Kirkup	2015	PDF	To investigate the management, delivery and outcomes of care provided by the maternity and neonatal services at the University Hospitals of Morecambe Bay NHS Foundation Trust from January 2004 to June 2013
The Harris Review	Lord Harris	2015	PDF	Report of the Independent Review into Self-inflicted Deaths in Custody of 18–24 year olds
Independent Review of deaths and serious incidents in police custody	Elish Angiolini	2017	PDF	Independent review of deaths and serious incidents in police custody
Paterson Inquiry	Graham James	2020	PDF	Report of the Independent Inquiry into the issues raised by Ian Paterson
Hillsborough Independent Panel	James Jones	September 2012	PDF	Including to oversee full public disclosure of relevant government and local information within the limited constraints set out in the accompanying protocol and consult with the Hillsborough families to ensure that the views of those most affected by the tragedy are taken into account.
Gosport Independent Panel	James Jones	June 2018	PDF	Concerns about the care of older patients in Gosport War Memorial Hospital have been the subject of scrutiny since 1998. Families of those who died have persistently sought a full and independent investigation into the circumstances surrounding the death of their relatives and into the care they received prior to death.
Daniel Morgan Independent Panel	Baroness O'Loan	June 2021	PDF	To investigate the circumstances of Daniel Morgan's murder, its background and the handling of the case over the whole period since March 1987.

=== Royal commissions ===
The last royal commission was established during the Blair government in 1999, when he established the Royal Commission on the Reform of the House of Lords.

=== Ad hoc committees of privy counsellors ===
Ad hoc committees are made up of members of the Privy Council as they can be informed on 'Privy Council Terms', which allows members of the committees to be informed on the understanding that any secret information provided will remain confidential.

Inquiry name	Chair	Date appointed	Date of report	Final report	Reason for inquiry
Falkland Islands Review aka The Franks Inquiry	Lord Franks	6 July 1982	January 1983	PDF	To review the period leading up to the Argentine invasion of the Falkland Islands on 2 April 1982
Review of Intelligence on Weapons of Mass Destruction aka The Butler Inquiry	Lord Butler	3 February 2004	14 July 2004	PDF	The intelligence services in the runup to military intervention in Iraq
The Iraq Inquiry aka The Chilcot Inquiry	Sir John Chilcot	30 July 2009	6 July 2016	Web	To identify the lessons to be learnt from the Iraq conflict
Detainee Inquiry aka The Gibson Inquiry	Sir Peter Gibson	18 January 2012	December 2013	PDF	To consider whether the UK security services were complicit in torture of detainees.

== See also ==
- Inquests in England and Wales
- Fatal accident inquiry (Scotland)
- Independent reviews in the United Kingdom
