= Undercover Policing Inquiry =

Review of undercover police procedures in England and Wales

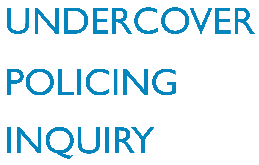
- Date: 17 July 2015 – (in progress)
- Location: London, United Kingdom
- Participants: Sir John Mitting (chair)
- Website: www.ucpi.org.uk

The Undercover Policing Inquiry is an independent statutory inquiry into undercover policing in England and Wales. It was announced by Theresa May, the then Home Secretary, on 6 March 2014, and its terms of reference were published on 16 July 2015. The Inquiry has been chaired by Sir John Mitting since July 2017, following the resignation, due to health reasons, of Sir Christopher Pitchford. The first interim report was published in June 2023 and was critical of the tactics used by undercover police. Mitting said in June 2025 that he would resign in 2026 following the publication of the second interim report. Concerns have been raised about the expense of the inquiry, how long it is taking and the impact of that on producing recommendations for changes to undercover policing.

== Background ==
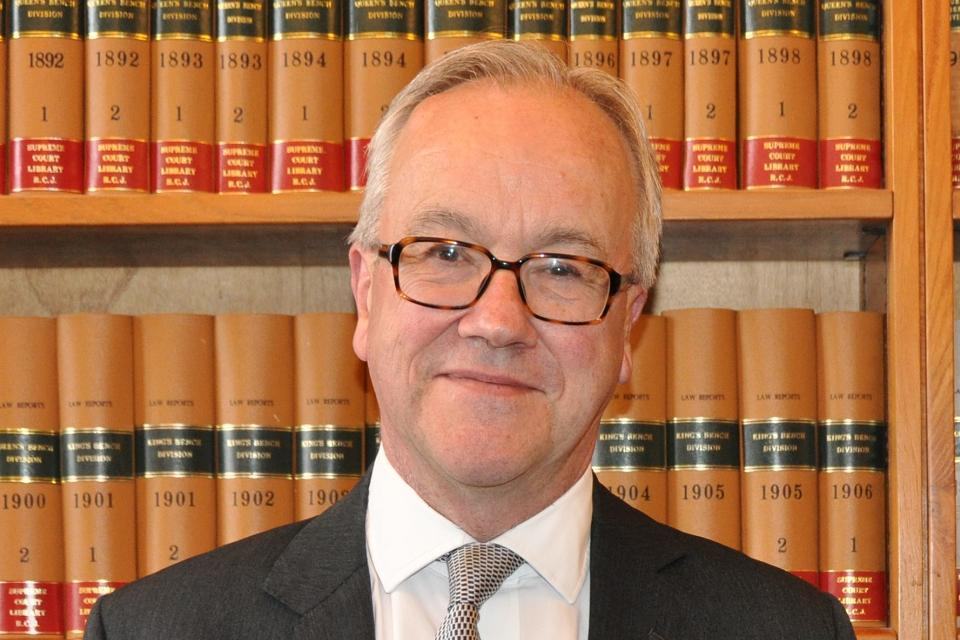
The Inquiry has been chaired by Sir John Mitting since July 2017

Theresa May commissioned the Undercover Policing Inquiry in 2015, in response to allegations about the activities of undercover units, including the disclosure that police had spied on campaigners fighting for justice for Stephen Lawrence.

In 2012 Theresa May had commissioned Mark Ellison KC to review allegations of corruption relating to the initial police investigation of the 1993 murder of Lawrence. The report from the Ellison review, presented to Parliament on 6 March 2014, found a number of serious concerns relating to undercover policing practices. Ellison also highlighted a possible link between an allegedly corrupt police officer involved in the Lawrence campaign, and the 1987 murder of private investigator Daniel Morgan.

== Remit ==
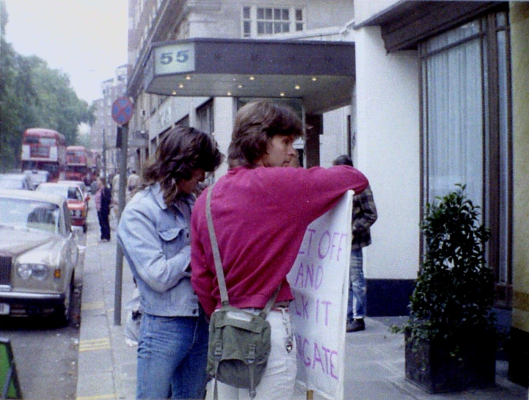
Police officer Bob Lambert of the Special Demonstration Squad undercover as a protester, at a demonstration against Unigate

The Inquiry is investigating undercover police operations conducted by English and Welsh police forces in England and Wales since 1968. It primarily examines the conduct of two now disbanded units: the Metropolitan Police's Special Demonstration Squad (SDS) and the National Public Order Intelligence Unit (NPOIU). It is looking at allegations that undercover officers infiltrated and disrupted social justice groups and movements, deceived women into intimate relationships, used the names of dead children to create fake identities, and concealed evidence in court cases.

== Inquiry ==
As of April 2018, the inquiry confirmed that undercover police had infiltrated about 1,000 groups, most of which were left of the political spectrum. This included the following groups and movements:

Anarchist groups, Animal Liberation Front, Anti-Apartheid Movement, Anti-Fascist Action, Big Flame, Black Power movement, Brixton Hunt Saboteurs, Colin Roach Centre, Dambusters Mobilising Committee, Dissent!, Earth First!, Essex Hunt Saboteurs, Friends of Freedom Press Ltd, Globalise Resistance, Independent Labour Party, Independent Working Class Association, International Marxist Group, International Socialists, Irish National Liberation Solidarity Front, London Animal Action, London Animal Rights Coalition, London Boots Action Group, London Greenpeace, Militant, No Platform, Antifa, Operation Omega, Reclaim the Streets, Red Action, Republican Forum, Revolutionary Socialist Students Federation, Socialist Party (England and Wales), Socialist Workers Party, South London Animal Movement (SLAM), Tri-Continental, Troops Out Movement, Vietnam Solidarity Campaign, West London Hunt Saboteurs, Workers Revolutionary Party, Young Haganah, Young Liberals, Youth against Racism in Europe.

=== Tranche 1 ===
The hearings for the first phase of Tranche 1 took place in November 2020 and took evidence about the SDS between 1968-1972 from non-state witnesses and undercover police officers. The inquiry started hearing evidence on 2 November 2020, with seven days of opening statements then seven days of evidence hearings. The hearings were conducted remotely due to the COVID-19 pandemic. The inquiry was to focus on the deployment of about 140 undercover police officers to spy on over 1,000 political groups over more than 40 years. The second phase of the Tranche 1 hearings were held in April and May 2021 and heard evidence about SDS activities between 1970-1979. In May 2022, the third phase of Tranche 1 of the inquiry mainly heard evidence from SDS police managers over the period 1968-1982.

The Inquiry published its interim report for Tranche 1 on 29 June 2023. The report found that the methods used by the Police were not justified, most of the groups they infiltrated were not a threat but there was no political bias, and that the SDS should have been disbanded earlier. The report raised questions about activities such as using the identities of deceased children and stated that the highest levels of government had approved the activities of the SDS, with the Home Office funding them.

=== Tranche 2 ===
The hearings for Tranche 2, which was focused on the actions of SDS officers and managers from 1983 to 1992, were organised into two phases, with the first phase taking place between 1 July 2024 and 2 August 2024 and the second phase hearings being held between October 2024 and February 2025. The first phase included evidence from non-government witnesses and undercover police officers, the second phase examined the targeting of social justice and animal rights campaigners and it also looked into the management and oversight of the SDS.

Evidence in Tranche 2 included the extent of the surveillance on the Campaign for Nuclear Disarmament, with their General Secretary describing it as “truly shocking, completely unjustified and anti-democratic”, one undercover officer criticising apologies given to women duped into sexual relationships, and another admitting to fathering a child whilst in a deceptive relationship. On 1 November 2024 the inquiry announced that it would be halting the streamings of the hearings until mid-December 2024.

=== Tranche 3 ===
This part of the inquiry examined the activities of the SDS between 1993 and 2007. The first phase of hearings for Tranche 3 began on 13 October 2025 and completed on 17 December 2025. Evidence in this phase included that one undercover officer had participated in public disorder with anti-racism campaigners, that occurred at the Stephen Lawrence Inquiry and that an undercover officer had a lengthy relationship with a woman, over a number of years, and that he lived with her. She described him as having "sadistic tendencies". Throughout this time she was unaware that he was married with children.

The second phase of hearings were held between 2 February 2026 and 28 March 2026. A significant revelation during this phase was the fact that the police spied on the family of Jean Charles de Menezes, after they killed him as the family campaigned for justice, with surveillance records noting details such as the family going to lay flowers to commemorate his death. A relative described it as "invasive and unnecessary".

The third phase began on 15 June 2026. The inquiry learnt that senior staff at Scotland Yard employed police in New Zealand to monitor a woman who had a previous relationship with an undercover officer, whilst she went on holiday with her family, after she made attempts to trace the undercover officer, who had moved to New Zealand. As a result she experienced surveillance and her luggage was searched when she arrived in the country. The police also relocated the ex-officer and his family from New Zealand to Australia. As a result the police incurred costs of £2.5 million, which included the money spent to subsidise the purchase of a property for the ex-officer, as a result of the relocation. The woman involved, Helen Steel, best known for her involvement in the McLibel case, told the inquiry that "He raised the idea of having children, not me. It wasn’t something I had been thinking of, but I thought I had met the partner I wanted to spend the rest of my life with". The inquiry also learnt that another undercover officer had previously misled the inquiry in regards to whether he had engaged in a relationship during his duties.

=== Government consultation ===
On 16 July 2026, the government launched a consultation about the future of the inquiry, which closed on 20 September 2026. Sarah Jones stated that its purpose was to "gather views on the future of the Inquiry from those affected including core participants, stakeholders and the wider public". The rationale for the consultation highlighted that the inquiry was supposed to conclude within three years but had been ongoing for over a decade, that it had cost more than £138 million to date, and that ministers were concerned about the cost, how long the inquiry was taking and the fact that this was delaying recommendations, and sought views on the inquiry's future scope, structure and format.

Imran Khan stated that it was the actions and conduct of the Metropolitan Police that have slowed down the progress of the inquiry, citing their applications for anonymity and restriction orders, and candour during the inquiry as factors contributing to the long duration and high expense. The Campaign Opposing Police Surveillance stated that the police had disrupted and stalled proceedings and were concerned that the Home Office was attempting to close the inquiry.

== Legislation authorising criminal undercover activity ==
Some years after commissioning the inquiry to investigate potential misconduct in undercover policing, the government introduced the Covert Human Intelligence Sources (Criminal Conduct) Bill, which effectively allows the Police and a broader range of public authorities, such as HMRC, to authorise "agents and informants to commit crimes while undercover". The Joint Committee on Human Rights stated that the law “raises the abhorrent possibility of serious crimes such as rape, murder or torture being carried out under an authorisation”. This legislation was approved in 2021, whilst the inquiry was in progress.

== Criticism of the inquiry ==
Criticisms levelled against the Inquiry have included concerns about long delays in its work (the Guardian said: "The inquiry has performed to perfection its dual function of creating the illusion of a political response, while firmly kicking the issue into the long grass"), the perceived suitability of Sir John Mitting as chair, and his decisions to allow many undercover officers giving evidence to the Inquiry to remain anonymous.

In March 2018 campaigners and their legal teams walked out of an Inquiry hearing, calling for Mitting to stand down or appoint a full panel.

In 2025, The Telegraph reported that the inquiry had cost £102 million with an additional £68.6 million in policing costs, and could overrun its extended date of 2027 until 2032. They quoted police sources critical of the wide scope of the inquiry and its cost and delays, in contrast to campaigners who identified the police's own legal tactics as a main source of delays.

== Organisations ==
The Undercover Research Group was founded in 2013 and is an activist-researcher collective. They have published written profiles of the undercover officers involved, analysis of various aspects of the surveillance, overviews of the groups spied-upon, the police units and a guide to the technical aspects of the public inquiry.

Other campaigning organisations have been established, which some core participants are involved with. These include the Campaign Opposing Police Surveillance (COPS) and Police Spies Out of Lives.

== See also ==
- List of public inquiries in the United Kingdom
- The Undercover Police Scandal: Love and Lies Exposed guardian, film directed by Lucy Wilcox
