= Special Demonstration Squad =

Undercover unit of London's Metropolitan Police

The Special Demonstration Squad (SDS) was an undercover unit of Greater London's Metropolitan Police Service (MPS or the Met), set up in 1968 with the approval of the Wilson government, to infiltrate British protest groups. It was part of the Special Branch. It operated from 1968 to 2008.

== History ==
The SDS was established by Special Branch as the Special Operations Squad in March 1968. Formed as a response to the anti-war demonstrations held outside the U.S. Embassy in London, then based at Grosvenor Square, the squad's purpose was to infiltrate "left-wing direct-action groups" using undercover police officers (nicknamed "hairies" because of their hippie appearance), who would liaise with MI5. In 1972 it was renamed the Special Demonstration Squad. It was renamed the Special Duties Squad in 1997 and disbanded in 2008.

== Activities ==
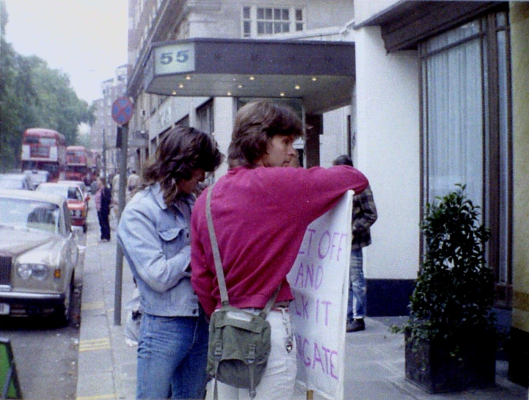
Police officer Bob Lambert undercover as a protester, at a demonstration against Unigate

The SDS's first operation was surveillance of anti-Vietnam war protesters, the Vietnam Solidarity Campaign. For example, nine SDS officers were covertly deployed into a 1968 public meeting of 250 campaigners deciding the route of a major anti-war demonstration. In the 80s it was infiltrating the CND with some evidence suggesting reports were exaggerated to at least in part try to support the continuation of the SDS. It also spied on pro-Palestinian rights organisations with 'Rob Harrison' infiltrating the International Solidarity Movement from 2004 till 2007.

The SDS used the names of 80 dead children to create false identities for its operatives. Some members of the SDS engaged in sexual relationships with protest organisers in an attempt to gain trust, and in some cases fathered children by them. In 2013, former SDS undercover officer Peter Francis revealed that the SDS investigated the family of Stephen Lawrence in order to seek possible evidence to smear Lawrence with in case of racially motivated public order issues. The revelation of this information led to Home Secretary Theresa May announcing an investigation in Parliament, while Stephen Lawrence's father Neville Lawrence arguing that the allegations merited an independent investigation. In the documentary broadcast as part of Channel 4's Dispatches programme, Francis confirmed that allegations made about officers having relationships with women involved with political protest movements were true.

After its closure in 2008 the role of the SDS was taken up in part by the National Domestic Extremism Unit.

== Aftermath ==
=== Litigation ===
On 23 October 2014, the Metropolitan Police Service agreed to pay £425,000 to a woman called Jacqui whose child was fathered by former SDS operative Bob Lambert; she did not know at the time of their relationship that he was an undercover police officer. The payment was part of an agreement for her to drop her legal action alleging assault, negligence, deceit and misconduct by senior officers. She was a 22-year-old activist at the time of her relationship with Lambert – who was using the pseudonym Bob Robinson – and she gave birth to their son in 1985. When the boy was two years old his father vanished, and she told BBC News she had received psychiatric care after learning the officer's real identity. The unprecedented payment resulted from a legal battle with women who said they were duped into relationships with officers who were spying on them. Scotland Yard said it "unreservedly apologises for any pain and suffering" but added that "the Metropolitan Police Service has never had a policy that officers can use sexual relations for the purposes of policing". Scotland Yard had previously refused to either confirm or deny whether Bob Lambert was an SDS operative, despite his own admissions to journalists. However, it was forced to change its position in August 2014 after a legal ruling. Lambert did not respond to BBC requests for comment on the settlement but had previously said that he wanted to apologise to women with whom he had relationships and that he had made some "serious mistakes".

At the time of the October 2014 settlement there were 12 other legal claims relating to undercover officers still being fought. But Jules Carey of Bindmans lawyers, acting for Jacqui, said the legal battles so far suggested Scotland Yard wanted to maintain a "never say never" stance to sexual relations after the Met's lawyers argued there could be a hypothetical extreme situation where such a tactic was needed. Carey said: "The Metropolitan Police are prepared to criticise the conduct of an individual officer, Bob Lambert. They are even prepared to be critical of the unit he was from – but they refuse to condemn the practice itself. It is time for the commissioner of Metropolitan Police to publicly commit to seeing the end of this shameful and abusive practice".

In December 2018, the High Court ruled against a request that the Crown Prosecution Service should prosecute SDS officer Jim Boyling for the offences of rape, indecent assault, procurement of sexual intercourse and misconduct in public office.

=== Apology ===
Officer John Dines had a two-year relationship with campaigner Helen Steel while working undercover for the SDS. In 2016, Steel tracked down Dines in Australia; he apologised for the emotional suffering caused.

=== Undercover Policing Inquiry ===
An independent public inquiry into undercover policing in England and Wales since 1968, the Undercover Policing Inquiry, was announced by Theresa May, the United Kingdom Home Secretary, on 12 March 2015, due to report by 2023. It is chaired by retired judge Sir John Mitting, and started hearing evidence on 2 November 2020. The inquiry will focus on the deployment of about 140 undercover police officers to spy on over 1,000 political groups over more than 40 years.

== In popular culture ==
In early 2014 a television drama series was announced based on the Special Demonstration Squad officers and their long-term relationships with activists upon whom they were spying. The working title was Undercovers with writing to be done by Simon Beaufoy, Alice Nutter, and Franny Armstrong who had previously worked on McLibel. The series was scheduled to be produced by Spanner Films with Tony Garnett as the executive producer. A TV series based on this, along with Stephen Lawrence's family being spied on, was aired in 2016 as Undercover.

== See also ==
- Andy Coles
- Forward Intelligence Team
- National Domestic Extremism Team
- National Coordinator for Domestic Extremism
- National Extremism Tactical Co-ordination Unit
- National Public Order Intelligence Unit
- COINTELPRO
