= National Domestic Extremism and Disorder Intelligence Unit =

Intelligence unit

The National Domestic Extremism and Disorder Intelligence Unit (formerly the National Domestic Extremism Unit) is an England and Wales police unit of the National Police Chiefs' Council within the Metropolitan Police Service Specialist Operations Group. Its role is to gather intelligence on domestic extremism in society, including acts of terrorism motivated by extremism.

== Role ==
The National Domestic Extremism and Disorder Intelligence Unit is a police unit within the Metropolitan Police Service Specialist Operations Group. The unit was created in 2004 under the Association of Chief Police Officers in Wales and England. The purpose of the unit is to gather intelligence on domestic extremism in society including acts of terrorism motivated by extremism.

=== Definition of domestic extremism ===
The Guardian reported in 2009 that there was no official or legal definition of domestic extremism. However, they say that a "vague stab" at a working definition by senior officers is that domestic extremists are individuals or groups "that carry out criminal acts of direct action in furtherance of a campaign. These people and activities usually seek to prevent something from happening or to change legislation or domestic policy, but attempt to do so outside of the normal democratic process." The same article quotes activists criticising this definition as too loose, worded to give "police the licence to carry out widespread surveillance of whole organisations that are a legitimate part of the democratic process."

The Independent described the definition as "a label for radical environmental activism – a sort of terrorism-lite." It quoted David Howarth, a former Liberal Democrats MP and law professor, who opposed what he saw as "an astonishing conflation of legitimate protest with terrorism".

== History ==
The a police unit set up in 2005 within the association of chief police officers (England and Wales) to provide a dedicated response to tackling extremism. It co-ordinated operations and investigations nationally, working closely in England and Wales with the Crown Prosecution Service which had a complementary network of prosecutors with specialist expertise in domestic extremism. The unit was led by an officer of the rank of detective chief inspector. From 2009 to 2013, this was Andy Robbins. on secondment from Kent Police.

In November 2010, it was announced that the three ACPO units commanded by the National Coordinator for Domestic Extremism (NCDE) would be rebranded as the National Domestic Extremism Unit (NDEU) and brought under the control of the Metropolitan Police by the summer of 2011. These merged units included the National Public Order Intelligence Unit and the National Extremism Tactical Co-ordination Unit.

It was estimated that over 9000 members were a part of this unit in 2013. The unit is now referred to as the National Domestic Extremism and Disorder Intelligence Unit (NDEDIU). The unit was headed by the Detective Chief Superintendent Chris Greany but is now vacant after he was promoted to Commander and then departed in September 2014. Chris Greany is now said to be with the National Police Coordination Centre (NPCC).

When the National Domestic Extremism Unit was under the Association of Chief Police Officers it consisted of multiple police units. Some of these units were actually known by the public for their use of force in protests and their deployment and mobilization of undercover police units in activist and political movements throughout Greater London. Some of these units included the National Public Order Intelligence Unit, National Domestic Extremism Team, and National Extremism Tactical Coordination Unit. As of May 2013, the unit is split into two distinct groups: the Protest and Disorder Intelligence Unit (with the purpose of providing strategic analysis in regards to protesting and public disorder) and the Domestic Extremism Intelligence Unit (with the purpose of providing intelligence of domestic extremism overseas and in the UK). Some notable operations include the tracing of an animal rights campaign titled Stop Huntingdon Animal Cruelty and the infamous letter bomber Miles Cooper.

In November 2010, it was announced that the three ACPO units commanded by the National Coordinator for Domestic Extremism would be rebranded as the National Domestic Extremism Unit and brought under the control of the Metropolitan Police Business Group by mid-2011. Two of the merged units were the National Extremism Tactical Co-ordination Unit and the National Public Order Intelligence Unit.

== National Domestic Extremism Database ==
The National Domestic Extremism and Disorder Intelligence Unit collects data and stores it in a massive database known as the National Domestic Extremism Database. This database has information on individuals who have been labeled domestic extremists or who have been associated with domestic extremism and protests including the topic of public disorder. The database appears to be managed by the Metropolitan Police Service and is designated under the National Special Branch Intelligence System (NSBIS). This database was not revealed until October 2009 by the Guardian. Little information is actually known about this database since it is so secretive. The Guardian revealed a series of documents in which information about citizens attending "lawful demonstrations" and gatherings was recorded and documented even though these civilians had nothing to do with extremism attacks. Prior to releasing information about the database, the Guardian had been posting news articles about United Kingdom police forces arresting and detaining protestors for disturbing peaceful protests. This media outlet was also reporting that the police had been claiming that all of the extensive background research they do was by no means invading personal space or property and they had valid reasoning to watch citizens of the United Kingdom. But at the same time these articles discussed the controversy of activists claiming the police were creating excuses to monitor the public.

Domestic extremism is used to distinguish individuals who are involved in campaigns or political groups which have a "militant edge" from terrorist groups or organizations, and where crime was a factor in the process of the campaign or protest. The intent of the extremist is usually to prevent an event or change a policy. The act will be completely out of the ordinary and may result in civilian casualties or potentially first responder/military casualties. Attacks range from stabbings and shootings to chemical bomb attacks. Extremist attacks are typically meant to pose threats to the public but not on a national scale, with the intent to grab the government's attention.

== Criticism ==
As a result of The Guardian articles with regards the activities and accusations of PC Mark Kennedy of the National Public Order Intelligence Unit within the National Extremism Tactical Co-ordination Unit, and the collapse of the subsequent trial of six activists, a number of initiatives and changes were announced:

- Acknowledging that "something had gone very wrong" in the Kennedy case to the Home Affairs Select Committee, Home Office minister Nick Herbert stated that ACPO would lose control of three teams involved in tackling domestic extremism. Herbert re-announced the already planned transfer of the units to the Metropolitan Police, with acting commissioner Tim Godwin confirming that this would occur at the earliest possible timescale.
- Her Majesty's Inspectorate of Constabulary announced that Bernard Hogan-Howe would lead an investigation into ACPO, to assess whether undercover operations had been "authorised in accordance with law" and "proportionate".
- The Serious Organised Crime Agency announced an inquiry into the conduct of Mark Kennedy.
- The Independent Police Complaints Commission announced an investigation into Nottinghamshire Police, over allegations it suppressed surveillance tapes recorded by Kennedy, the contents of which may have exonerated the six Ratcliffe activists.

== See also ==
- National Police Chiefs' Council
- Special Demonstration Squad, developed in the 1960s and served a similar purpose to the current NDEDIU
