= Helen Steel =

Environmental and social justice activist

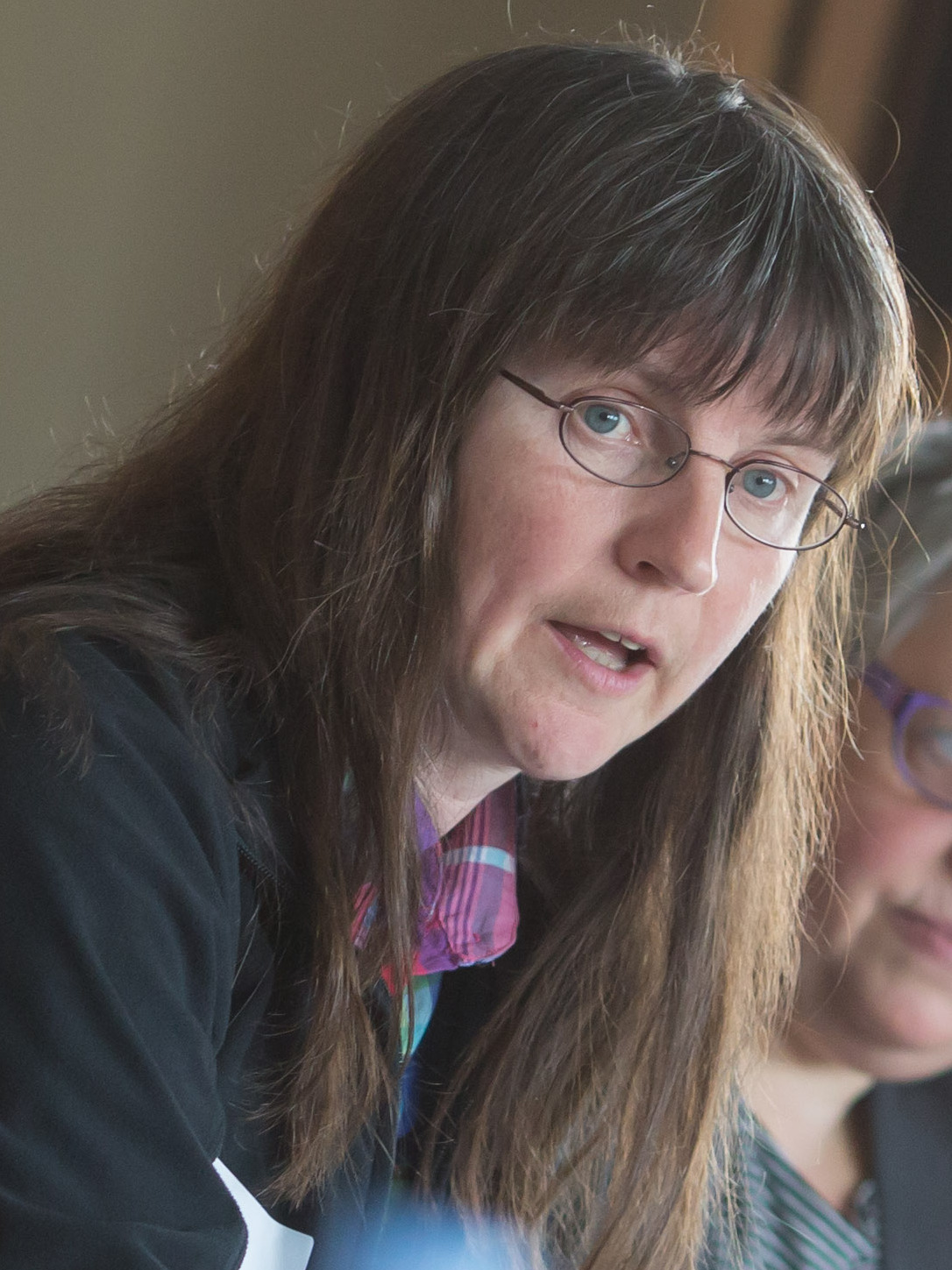
- Steel in 2016
- Born: 1965 (age 60–61); England, United Kingdom
- Occupation: Activist
- Known for: Defendant in the McLibel case

Helen Steel (born 1965) is an environmental and social justice activist who is known for her involvement in the McLibel case, an English lawsuit for libel filed by McDonald's Corporation that lasted for 10 years and was eventually taken to the European Court of Human Rights, where Steel and fellow campaigner David Morris won their case against the UK Government on the grounds that they had been denied a fair trial. She is a key figure in the 'Spycops' scandal and subsequent Undercover Policing Inquiry.

== McLibel case ==
In 1986, as a member of the London Greenpeace environmental campaign group, Steel and other campaigners, including undercover policeman Bob Lambert produced and distributed a pamphlet entitled "What's wrong with McDonald's – everything they don't want you to know", accusing the fast food chain of mistreating animals and underpaying its employees. In 1990 McDonald's served libel writs against five members of the group. Three members apologised, but Steel and David Morris refused to do so. At the time, Steel was working part-time at a bar, earning up to £65 a week, meaning that she and Morris (an unemployed postal worker) could not afford legal representation, and had to represent themselves in court, with occasional pro bono assistance from barrister Keir Starmer. The trial started in June 1994 at the Royal Courts of Justice in London, after a failed attempt to demand legal aid. Steel herself gave evidence (along with 59 defence witnesses), but in June 1997 the trial ended in defeat with Mr Justice Bell ordering the pair to pay £60,000 in damages to McDonald's, which was reduced to £40,000 on appeal. It was the longest trial in English legal history.

The pair refused to pay the compensation, although McDonald's never sought to collect it. They later took the UK Government to the European Court of Human Rights, stating that their lack of legal aid constituted a violation of their right to a fair trial, under Article 6 of the European Convention on Human Rights. The court found in favour of the pair, forcing the Government to consider legal reforms.

Documents from the case showed that McDonald's private investigators had been receiving information from the Metropolitan Police. The Metropolitan Police were sued over this; the case was settled out of court with an apology by the police and an undertaking by them not to share information from police computers with corporations.

== Undercover policing ==
Steel is a core participant in the Undercover Policing Inquiry. She is one of several women who were deceived into long-term relationships with undercover police officers, but is one of only two who have spoken publicly about the matter while using their own name. She was deceived into a long term relationship with police officer, John Dines (known to Steel as John Barker), who was working undercover, as part of a wider police operation, to gain information on campaigners involved in London Greenpeace. Steel met Dines in the late 1980s, and in 1990 began a relationship with him, which lasted two years. They lived together, and had discussed starting a family together. After two years Dines disappeared abroad, claiming to have had a breakdown. Steel has said she spent years searching for him, and it was during this time that she discovered he had been using a false identity (that of a dead child). She tracked him down and confronted him in 2016, when he apologised to her.

Steel is one of seven women who were apologised to by the Metropolitan Police for their deception and one of eight women to bring a legal action against the police for the abuses entailed by their undercover police operations.
