= Scottish Hospitals Inquiry =

The Scottish Hospitals Inquiry was established in 2019 to investigate the issues related to the construction of the Queen Elizabeth University Hospital, Glasgow, and the Royal Hospital for Children and Young People, Edinburgh.

== History ==
In September 2019, the Cabinet Secretary for Health and Sport Jeane Freeman announced that an independent public inquiry would be held. In November, Philip Brodie, Lord Brodie was appointed to chair the inquiry. Being carried out under the Inquiries Act 2005, it has the power to require witnesses to attend and to disclose relevant information.

The terms of reference were set out in June 2020. There were expectation that the first hearings might begin in August 2020 however the first public hearings commenced in September 2021.

Family members of patients who received treatment at the hospitals gave evidence.

== See also ==
- List of public inquiries in the United Kingdom
