= Undercover: The True Story of Britain's Secret Police =

2012 book by Rob Evans and Paul Lewis

- Authors: Rob Evans; Paul Lewis
- Language: English
- Subjects: Espionage, undercover police work
- Published: London
- Publisher: Guardian Books, Faber & Faber
- Publication date: 2012
- Publication place: United Kingdom
- Media type: Print (paperback)
- Pages: 346
- ISBN: 9780852652688
- Dewey Decimal: 363.2520941

Undercover: The True Story of Britain's Secret Police is a 2012 book by The Guardian journalists Rob Evans and Paul Lewis.

== Synopsis ==
The book investigates the infiltration of political activist groups in the United Kingdom by police forces, such as the Metropolitan Police. Groups targeted included those of the revolutionary left, far-right, and apolitical community campaigners. One police infiltrator, Bob Lambert was accused by a Member of the House of Commons of participating in a firebombing on a retailer selling fur. Lambert has also admitted fathering a child whilst undercover. Police stole the identities of deceased persons, often children, and created fake passports, licences and bank accounts.

== Reception ==
Critical reception for Undercover has been positive. Alan White in the New Statesman wrote "Undercover compels the reader throughout, which is a testament to the investigative and writing skills of Evans and Lewis" and noted "the result is an example of the kind of classic, long-haul journalism that has, over recent years, produced scoops that have rattled the establishment, provoked multiple police inquiries and offered up an extraordinary series of revelations. The work of these authors is one of the best arguments in favour of a free press you’ll ever read." Marc Hudson in Peace News advised "activists really must read this book. They should share it, discuss it and learn from it".

The book was also featured in a piece in the London Review of Books.

== See also ==
- UK undercover policing relationships scandal
