= Rob Evans (reporter) =

Investigative reporter

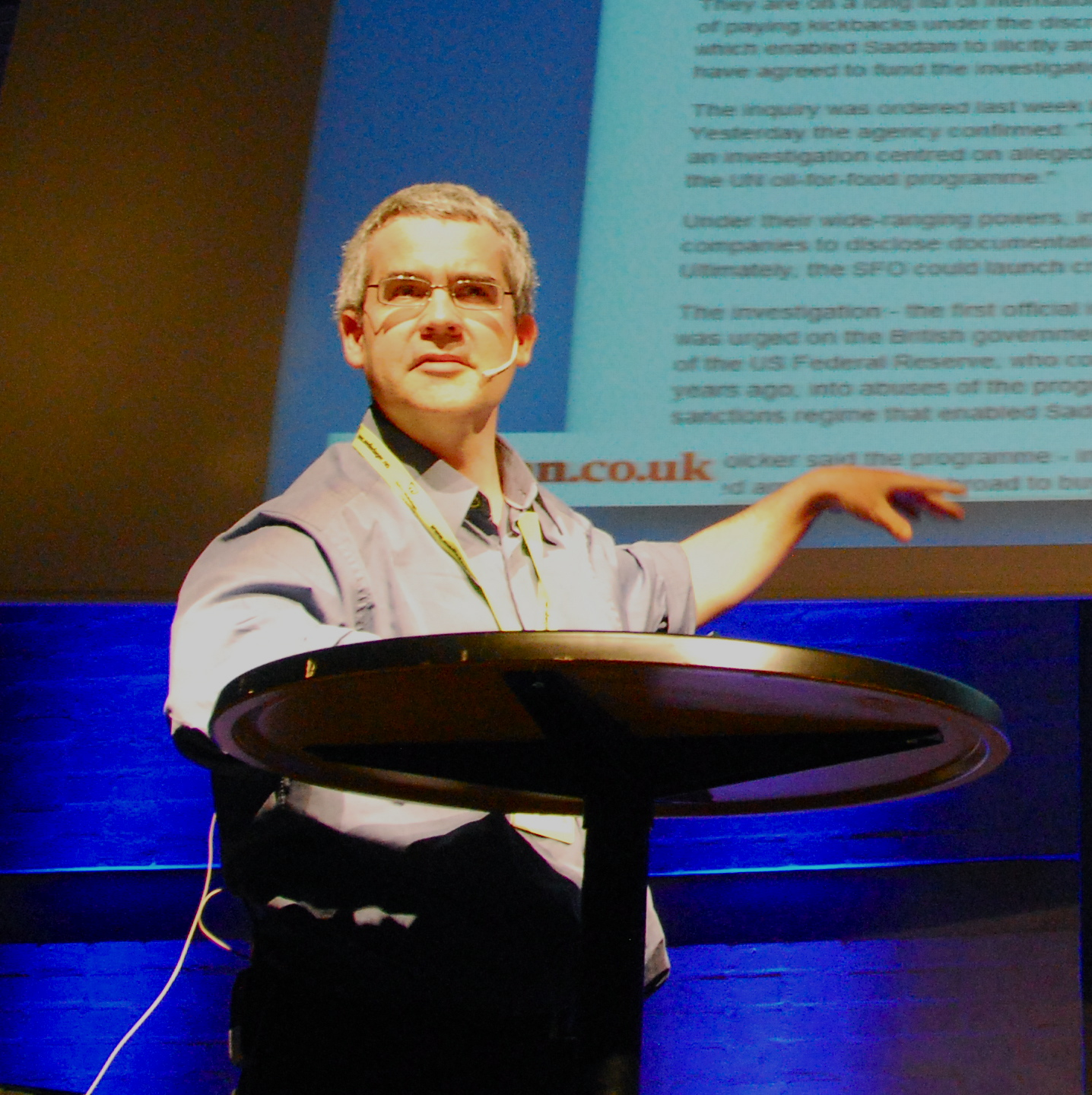
Rob Evans

Rob Evans is an investigative reporter. He was instrumental in the exposé of BAE Systems' corrupt payments. He also worked on the promotion of freedom of information primarily via the book he co-authored with colleague Paul Lewis, Undercover: The True Story of Britain's Secret Police. The two authors exposed 40 years of espionage through the book. Evans also wrote Gassed: British Chemical Warfare Experiments on Humans at Porton Down. Awards received include for Undercover, and for his exposition of the Al-Yamamah arms deal. He started work at The Guardian in 1999.
