= Troops Out Movement =

Irish republican organisation

The Troops Out Movement (TOM) was an Irish republican organisation formed in the United Kingdom in 1973, following actions by the British Army in Northern Ireland during the Troubles, including the Bloody Sunday and Ballymurphy massacres by the Parachute Regiment. The organisation's goals were to secure the withdrawal of British troops from Northern Ireland and support self-determination for the Irish people as a whole. These main aims were supplemented by smaller ones such as the demilitarisation of the Northern Irish police and the paramilitary Ulster Special Constabulary (USC) as well as opposition to discriminatory policies against Catholics in Northern Ireland. The TOM sought partnerships and other forms of cooperation with like-minded organisations in Ireland, Great Britain, and internationally.

As the Troubles continued to grow in severity, with increasing clashes in Northern Ireland between Irish republicans and unionist, primarily paramilitary groups such as the Provisional Irish Republican Army (IRA) and the Ulster Volunteer Force (UVF), the TOM developed close links with Sinn Féin. The TOM undertook measures to distance themselves from the IRA while simultaneously maintaining that armed struggle was a reasonable response to the discrimination faced by Catholics in Northern Ireland and the various policies instituted by the British government.

TOM's two main demands, "British troops out of Ireland" and "self-determination for the Irish people as a whole" both called for the withdrawal of the British government from Northern Ireland, as the TOM considered that this was fundamental to a peaceful solution to the Troubles, and would lead to the realisation of Irish self-determination.

== Origins ==
The movement was founded in London in late 1973. Its first main event, a large public meeting, took place at Fulham Town Hall on 24 October 1973. By the end of the year there were branches in Manchester, Coventry, Birmingham as well. By 1975 the TOM claimed to have a membership of over 1,200 people. The TOM was a 'single issue' organisation, but its membership generally comprised people who were also members of left-wing, socially progressive and humanitarian organisations. This shaped its campaigns but also caused some friction with views of the various groups it worked with in Ireland; this was particularly true for issues such as women's liberation, gay rights and anti-racism. The TOM campaigned very actively across the British political sphere; establishing close ties with many political, social and cultural organisations among Britain's Irish communities, British trade unions, religious groups, anti-Nazi and anti-racist organisations, and international support groups.

It also served as a method for the British public to learn about the Troubles, organising public meetings, conferences, concerts, a UK-wide branch meeting structure, frequent demonstrations and protests in every major city in Britain, annual and other delegations to Northern Ireland, managed visits to Ireland, publications, etc. Notably, TOM organised "Black Flag" protests on days which Irish hunger strikers in Northern Ireland died.

Between 1974 and 1976 the group was infiltrated by an undercover police officer of the Special Demonstration Squad who managed to obtain a leadership position.

== Later years ==
By the 1990s, TOM, while supporting the Good Friday Agreement for its stance on justice, policing, equality, demilitarisation, employment discrimination, cultural rights and the Irish language, highlighted its failure to address sectarian attacks on republican communities from loyalist paramilitaries.

The TOM also started to campaign against the Irish government as it enacted stringent measures against the IRA and supported measures to suppress the organisation, including the shoot-to-kill policy, use of torture, false imprisonment, covert military and paramilitary actions, false confessions, and manipulation of the media to misreport events. They protested for the immediate end to the use of rubber and plastic bullets in Northern Ireland. After the relative peace in Northern Ireland following the Good Friday Agreement and subsequent ceasefire, TOM activity declined. By the mid-2000s, very few, if any active branches existed, the monthly TOM paper ceased publication and the ad-hoc on-line briefing had also stopped. One notable member of the TOM was Paddy Prendiville, who later went on to edit the satirical magazine The Phoenix.
