= National Extremism Tactical Co-ordination Unit =

Private British police organisation

- Abbreviation: NETCU
- Predecessor: National Public Order Intelligence Unit
- Successor: National Domestic Extremism Unit
- Formation: May 2004
- Dissolved: 2011
- Type: QUANGO
- Purpose: Monitoring of extremist groups in the UK
- Location: Huntingdon, Cambridgeshire, PE29 9AL
- Region served: UK
- Parent organization: Association of Chief Police Officers
- Website: www.netcu.org.uk (archived here at the Internet Archive)

The National Extremism Tactical Co-ordination Unit (NETCU) was a British police organisation funded by, and reporting to, the Association of Chief Police Officers (ACPO) that coordinated police action against groups in the United Kingdom it described as extremist.

== Structure ==
As of April 2007, it was headed by Superintendent Steve Pearl. Because the ACPO was not a public body but rather a private limited company, NETCU was exempt from freedom of information laws and other kinds of public accountability, even though they were funded by the Home Office and deployed police officers from regional forces.

== Background ==
"NETCU provides tactical advice and guidance on policing single-issue domestic extremism. The unit also supports companies and other organisations that are the targets of domestic extremism campaigns. NETCU reports through the National Coordinator for Domestic Extremism (NCDE) to the Association of Chief Police Officers Terrorism and Allied Matters - ACPO(TAM) committee."

NETCU answered to the Association of Chief Police Officers' (ACPO) Terrorism and Allied Matters Committee, and in particular to ACPO's National Coordinator for Domestic Extremism, Detective Chief Superintendent Adrian Tudway. It worked with the Home Office, and the National Public Order Intelligence Unit.

The unit was created in or around May 2004 to coordinate police action in relation to animal rights campaigns. It was based in Huntingdon, Cambridgeshire, which had been a focal point for animal rights activism as a result of the Stop Huntingdon Animal Cruelty campaign.

Apart from animal rights groups, it also investigated the UK Life League, a direct action anti-abortion group that protests outside abortion clinics.

== Takeover by the Metropolitan Police ==
In November 2010 it was announced that the three ACPO units commanded by the National Domestic Extremism and Disorder Intelligence Unit would be rebranded as the National Domestic Extremism Unit and brought under the control of the Metropolitan Police by Summer 2011.

== The future of NETCU ==
According to NETCU's own website

following reviews within ACPO TAM and a HMIC Value for Money Review, it was agreed by the ACPO TAM board to merge the three Domestic Extremism units into single national function under a lead force.

The National Co-ordinator for Domestic Extremism, Detective Chief Superintendent Adrian Tudway, is currently managing the merger said "The three domestic extremism units were set up at different times during a six year period, with the current economic climate and the need to maximise resources it makes sense to merge."

An article in The Guardian on the three "domestic extremism" units working under the direction of Detective Chief Superintendent Adrian Tudway states that

concerns have been growing about the accountability and subject to agreement they will be taken over by the Met under a "lead force" agreement – the same way the Met has overall command of national counter-terrorism operations.

== See also ==
- National Public Order Intelligence Unit
