= London Greenpeace =

British environmentalist activist collective

London Greenpeace was an anarchist environmentalist activist collective that existed between 1972 and 2001. They were based in London, and came to international prominence when two of their activists refused to capitulate to McDonald's in the landmark libel case known as "McLibel". It was not affiliated with Greenpeace International nor with their British branch (Greenpeace UK).

== Origins ==
In 1972 a group of activists loosely associated with the Peace News newspaper formed a new group committed to environmentalism and anarchism. Initially the group campaigned for the ending of atmospheric testing of nuclear weapons by France at Mururoa atoll in the south Pacific. In support of this, in 1973 the group held a 60-strong protest march from London to Paris, via Dover, Ostend and Wattrelos, ending in a demonstration at Notre Dame cathedral.

London Greenpeace was not affiliated with Greenpeace International. Greenpeace International was formed out of a rough coalition of various environmentalist groups in 1971, many of whom were already using the name "Greenpeace". London Greenpeace emphatically wanted to remain independent of this new and larger Greenpeace, which it saw as being too "centralized and mainstream for their tastes".

== Political affiliation ==
The group was formed to show the links between militarism and environmental damage. They were linked, ideologically and in their activism, with radical environmentalism, green anarchism and pacifism. They were officially affiliated with War Resisters' International, the National Peace Council, and Campaign Against Arms Trade, and supportive of the Animal Liberation movement. In the 1980s they were involved with the Stop the City campaigns, whilst the 1990s saw them helping to initiate the London-wide Reclaim The Streets Network. They are viewed as one of the first anarchist groups to promote a specifically environmentalist message.

During the second half of the 1970s the group pioneered the campaign against nuclear power, and worked with a number of anti-nuclear alliances such as Stop Urenco, the Torness Alliance, and the Nuclear Information network. London Greenpeace was also involved in the opposition to the Falklands War, and co-founded the Anti-Falkland War Support network.

London Greenpeace gained public attention with the McLibel case, which became well known as one of the first SLAPP suits against freedom of expression. McDonald's Restaurants sued London Greenpeace, which later morphed into "McDonald's vs Steel and Morris". The case lasted for 15 years and was finally settled in 2005. The McLibel case became famous because McDonald's lost the public relations case in the public mind.

== McLibel ==
In 1990 McDonald's issued proceedings against five London Greenpeace supporters, Paul Gravett, Andrew Clarke and Jonathan O'Farrell, Helen Steel and David Morris, for libel. The company offered to withdraw actions against each individual in return for an apology and an undertaking not to repeat the claims. The activists had been distributing a pamphlet throughout London containing allegations regarding starvation in the Third World, destruction of rainforest, the use of recycled paper, links between the company's food and heart disease & breast/bowel cancer, false advertising, the rearing and slaughter of animals, food poisoning, and employment practices. Of the five defendants, Gravett, Clarke and O'Farrell apologised to McDonald's, while Steel and Morris (often referred to as "The McLibel Two") refused.

Almost all of London Greenpeace's resources and efforts went to helping the pair over the years the case was heard, but in 1997 both defendants lost and were ordered to pay McDonald's £60,000. However, the extended court battle was a public relations failure for McDonald's; the company decided not to pursue the two defendants for the money.

== Dissolution ==
In 2001 London Greenpeace issued a public statement announcing their dissolution. While the McLibel action brought fresh energy, publicity and urgency to the organisation, this did not last long, and the group felt it best to permanently suspend their efforts.

== Police infiltration ==
In October 2011 activists from the group exposed Robert Lambert, whom they had known as Bob Robinson, as a former undercover police officer who had infiltrated the group. After court cases centring on Lambert and other undercover police officers, in 2014 and 2015 the Metropolitan Police apologised and paid compensation to eight women who had had intimate relationships with undercover officers, including Lambert. The police admitted that the relationships had been "abusive, deceitful, manipulative and wrong".

Steel said that another undercover police officer from the Special Demonstration Squad, John Dines, became treasurer of London Greenpeace. The Guardian reported that Lambert co-wrote the leaflet central to the McLibel trial.

== See also ==
- Earth First!
