= John Mitting =

British high court judge (born 1947)

Sir John Edward Mitting
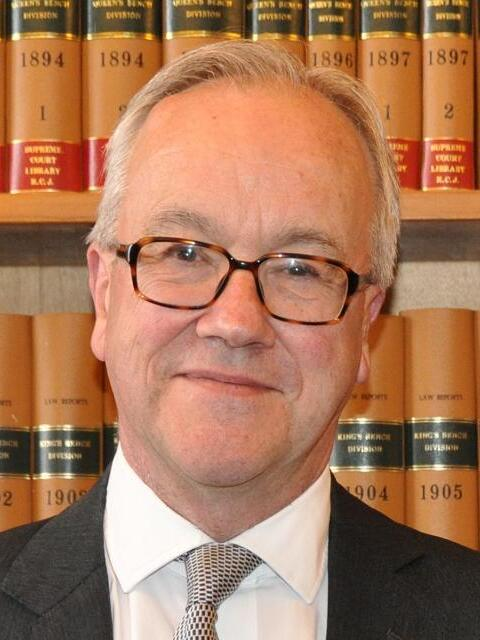
- Mitting in 2017

Justice of the High Court
- In office 3 April 2001 – 2017
- Appointed by: Elizabeth II

Special Immigration Appeals Commission Chairman
- In office 2007–2012
- Monarch: Elizabeth II

Personal details
- Born: John Edward Mitting; 8 October 1947 (age 78)
- Education: Downside School
- Alma mater: Trinity Hall, Cambridge

Sir John Edward Mitting (born 8 October 1947) is a retired judge of the High Court of England and Wales. He has chaired the Undercover Policing Inquiry since 2017.

== Education ==
Mitting attended Downside School and Trinity Hall, Cambridge.

== Legal career ==
He was called to the bar at Gray's Inn in 1970 and made a bencher in 1996. He became a Queen's Counsel in 1987. He was appointed a Recorder in 1988. On 3 April 2001, he was appointed a High Court judge, receiving the customary Knight Bachelor, and assigned to the Queen's Bench Division. He served as Chairman of the Special Immigration Appeals Commission from 2007 to 2012. He presided over the Libel Case related to "Plebgate" and the Uber English language tests case.

He retired as a High Court judge on his 70th birthday in 2017, and has been appointed to chair the Undercover Policing Inquiry, following the resignation due to ill-health of Lord Justice Pitchford. In March 2018 campaigners and their legal team walked out of a hearing of the inquiry, calling for him to step down.

== Personal life ==
Mitting is married to Judith, a retired solicitor who also sat as a part-time judge specialising in tax tribunals. Lady Mitting was previously managing partner of Grindeys solicitors in Stoke-on-Trent. She is the Chair of Katharine House Hospice in Stafford.
