= Revolutionary Socialist Student Federation =

The Revolutionary Socialist Student Federation was a militant student body in Great Britain launched in 1968.
