= National Public Order Intelligence Unit =

English company

The UK's National Public Order Intelligence Unit (NPOIU) operated from 1999 to 2010 and was one of two police units, along with the Special Demonstration Squad, created to infiltrate political and activist groups, with the intention of gathering intelligence to assist in public order policing. It was to have been part of tranche 4 of the Undercover Policing Inquiry, but, as of 2026, investigation of that tranche had not begun, and the UK government is consulting on whether to continue with this plan.

The National Public Order Intelligence Unit (NPOIU) was run by the Association of Chief Police Officers (ACPO), a private company connected to United Kingdom police intelligence, and was set up in 1999 to track green activists and public demonstrations. It has been found that much of the Unit's work was against "activists working on social justice, anti-racist, and environmental campaigns" and legitimate dissent, rather than extremist groups, with more than 1,000 political groups having been subjected to surveillance by covert officers. The work of the group has been accused as having hobbled climate-related protest in the late 2000s in the United Kingdom and more widely.

There are links between NPOIU, ACPO, National Domestic Extremism Unit (NDEU), National Extremism Tactical Co-ordination Unit (NETCU) and the Welsh Extremism and Counter Terrorism Unit (WECTU).

== Structure ==
Because the ACPO is a private limited company rather than a public body, it is exempt from public accountability, including freedom of information laws, even though it was funded by the Home Office and deploys police officers from regional forces.

== History ==
Established in March 1999, the NPOIU incorporated the Animal Rights National Index, work that had previously been the responsibility of the various Special Branches. Initially operated as part of the Metropolitan Police Special Branch. and is now part of the Specialist Operations Business Group.

== Purpose ==
On 10 November 2009, in a question in the House of Commons, MP Dai Davies (Blaenau Gwent, Independent), asked the then Secretary of State for the Home Department various questions about the National Public Order Intelligence Unit (NPOIU). In response the Minister of State for Crime and Policing, David Hanson, responded that the main purpose of the unit was to:

- Provide the police service with an ability to develop a national threat assessment and profile for domestic extremism.
- Support forces to reduce crime and disorder from domestic extremism.
- Support a proportionate police response to protest activity.
- Help forces manage concerns of communities and businesses in order to minimise conflict and disorder.

According to HM Inspectorate of Constabulary the NPOIU "performs an intelligence function in relation to politically motivated disorder (not legitimate protests) on behalf of England, Wales and Scotland." by "co-ordinat[ing] the national collection, analysis, exploitation and dissemination of intelligence on the extremist threat to public order."

Evening Standard investigative journalist Andrew Gilligan described it as "a secretive, Scotland Yard-based police taskforce" whose "role in controlling dissent is central".

== Organisation ==
The NPOIU was based in London, either at Scotland Yard, or on the 5th Floor of Tintagel House on the bank of the River Thames. The unit has a staff of 60-70 officers and police staff, seconded from other forces, and has had its budget more than doubled in four years from £2.6 million in 2005/06 to £5.7 million in 2009/10. The unit is led by an officer of the rank of Detective Superintendent, as of 2006 this was Maria Smith of the Wiltshire Constabulary.

The NPOIU formed one branch of the National Domestic Extremism Unit (NDEU), under the control of ACPO's National Coordinator for Domestic Extremism, Detective Chief Supt Adrian Tudway. The NPOIU works in conjunction with the National Extremism Tactical Co-ordination Unit (NETCU) and the National Domestic Extremism Team (NDET).

=== Confidential Intelligence Unit ===
The Confidential Intelligence Unit was set up in 1999 through discussions held by the members of the Association of Chief Police Officers of England and Wales to observe extremist political groups throughout the UK. The section of the unit is led by an officer of the rank of Detective Chief Inspector.

== Operations ==
Strathclyde Police were criticised by pacifist demonstrators at the Faslane nuclear submarine base after demonstrators' details were sent to the unit. Anti-genetically modified food protesters and Muslim university students have also been under surveillance by the unit.

In January 2011, it was reported that Mark Kennedy of the Metropolitan Police was one of the first officers to work as an undercover infiltrator for the NPOIU, and had spent seven years within the environmental protest movement. Kennedy later confirmed in an exclusive interview with The Mail on Sunday, arranged through PR agent Max Clifford, that he as Simon Jenkins suspected suffered a version of "Stockholm syndrome". In 2022, the Investigatory Powers Tribunal found that, regarding Kate Wilson, one of the women who had sued the police in the high court, Kennedy had “invaded the core of her private life”, “caused her mental suffering" and that he had “interfered” with her “sexual autonomy” and showed “a profound lack of respect” for her “bodily integrity and human dignity.” It found that his actions were an “abuse of the highest order.” In January 2022 the tribunal found that Kennedy had “grossly debased, degraded and humiliated” his victim and awarded her £229,000 in compensation. The tribunal described Kennedy as a "highly unreliable narrator" and stated "we do not consider we can put any weight on statements and comments he has made". Former US climate activist Harry Halpin stated that Kennedy's actions "intentionally destroyed" the global momentum building behind a climate protest movement during the late 2000s.

== Takeover by the Metropolitan Police Specialist Operations Business Group ==
In November 2010 it was announced that the three ACPO units commanded by the National Coordinator for Domestic Extremism would be rebranded as the National Domestic Extremism Unit and brought under the control of the Metropolitan Police Business Group by mid-2011.

Following The Guardian articles about the activities and accusations of Mark Kennedy, and the collapse of the trial of six activists, a number of initiatives and changes were announced:

- Acknowledging that "something had gone very wrong" in the Kennedy case to the Home Affairs Select Committee, Home Office minister Nick Herbert stated that ACPO would lose control of three teams involved in tackling domestic extremism. Herbert re-announced the already planned transfer of the units to the Metropolitan Police, with acting commissioner Tim Godwin confirming that this would occur at the earliest possible timescale.
- HM Inspectorate of Constabulary announced that Bernard Hogan-Howe would lead an investigation into ACPO, to assess whether undercover operations had been "authorised in accordance with law" and "proportionate". This investigation was later expanded to become Operation Herne, first led by Pat Gallan but then transferred to Mick Creedon in February 2013 after "allegations in the media concerning the use of deceased children’s identities" were made. The report was released to limited circulation in 2015.
- The Serious Organised Crime Agency announced an inquiry into the conduct of Mark Kennedy.
- The Independent Police Complaints Commission announced an investigation into Nottinghamshire Police, over allegations it suppressed surveillance tapes recorded by Kennedy, the contents of which may have exonerated the six Ratcliffe activists.

== See also ==
- Forward Intelligence Team
