= Agent provocateur =

Person who incites others to commit incriminating acts

An agent provocateur (French for 'inciting agent') is a person who actively entices, encourages and incites another person to commit a crime that would not otherwise have been committed and then reports the person to the authorities. They may target individuals or groups.

In jurisdictions in which conspiracy is a serious crime in itself, it can be sufficient for the agent provocateur to entrap the target into discussing and planning an illegal act. It is not necessary for the illegal act to be carried out or even prepared.

Prevention of infiltration by agents provocateurs is part of the duty of demonstration marshals, also called stewards, deployed by organizers of large or controversial assemblies.

== History and etymology ==
While the practice was worldwide in antiquity, modern undercover operations were scaled up in France by Eugène François Vidocq in the early 19th century, and included the use of unlawful tactics against opponents. Later in the same century, police targets included union activists who came to fear plain-clothed policemen. The French term agent provocateur was then borrowed as-is into English and German. In accordance with French grammar, the correct plural form of the term is agents provocateurs.

== Common usage ==
An agent provocateur is an individual who is recruited to infiltrate a group to incite others to commit illegal, rash or violent acts. The primary purpose is often to compromise the target group, justify actions against them or to discredit their causes.

Often, an agent provocateur gains the trust of a target organization (such as political movements, labor strikes or protest groups) to operate from within. Instead of observing or spying, the agent actively encourages and incite others to break the law. The evidence gathered from the illegal acts are then used by those who employed the agent to make arrests, prosecute members, justify repression or turn public opinion against the entire organization.

A political organization or government (domestic or foreign) may use agents provocateurs against their targets (opponents such as protesters, opposition groups or enemy states). The provocateurs try to incite their targets to do counter-productive, unpopular or ineffective acts, such as violence (arson, rioting or bombing) to foster public disdain in order to destroy their reputation and/or provide a pretext for the final assault against their targets (political repression or casus belli for military intervention). They engineer scenarios whereby a crime is committed, exploiting the individual or group's willingness to act, which might not have occurred without the agent's involvement. The provocateurs also aim to cause internal suspicion, paranoia, and dysfunction to divide their targets, weakening it and making it easier for their opponents to manage or defeat it, often by influencing the direction and messaging that ultimately breaks the law.

Historically, labor spies, hired to infiltrate, monitor, disrupt, or subvert union activities, have used agent provocateur tactics.

Agent provocateur activities raise ethical and legal issues. In common law jurisdictions, the legal concept of entrapment may apply if the main impetus for the crime was the provocateur.

== By region ==
=== Canada ===
On August 20, 2007, during meetings of the Security and Prosperity Partnership of North America in Montebello, Quebec, three police officers were revealed among the protesters by Dave Coles, president of the Communications, Energy and Paperworkers Union of Canada, and alleged to be provocateurs. The police posing as protestors wore masks and all black clothes; one was notably armed with a large rock. They were asked to leave by protest organizers.

After the three officers had been revealed, their fellow officers in riot gear handcuffed and removed them. The evidence that revealed these three men as "police provocateurs" was initially circumstantial-they were imposing in stature, similarly dressed, and wearing police boots. According to veteran activist Harsha Walia, it was other participants in the black bloc who identified and exposed the undercover police.

After the protest, the police force initially denied, then later admitted that three of their officers disguised themselves as demonstrators; they then denied that the officers were provoking the crowd and instigating violence. The police released a news release in French where they stated "At no time did the police of the Sûreté du Québec act as instigators or commit criminal acts" and "At all times, they responded within their mandate to keep order and security."

During the 2010 G20 Toronto summit, the Royal Canadian Mounted Police (RCMP) arrested five people, two of whom were members of the Toronto Police Service. City and provincial police, including the TPS, went on to arrest 900 people in the largest mass arrest in Canadian history. The RCMP watchdog commission saw no indication that RCMP undercover agents or event monitors acted inappropriately.

=== Europe ===
In February 1817, after the Prince Regent was attacked, the British government employed agents provocateurs to obtain evidence against the agitators.

Sir John Retcliffe was an agent provocateur for the Prussian secret police.

Francesco Cossiga, former head of secret services and Head of state of Italy, advised the 2008 minister in charge of the police, on how to deal with the protests from teachers and students:

He should do what I did when I was Minister of the Interior. [...] infiltrate the movement with agents provocateurs inclined to do anything [...] And after that, with the momentum gained from acquired popular consent, [...] beat them for blood and beat for blood also those teachers that incite them. Especially the teachers. Not the elderly, of course, but the girl teachers, yes.

Another example occurred in France in 2010 where police disguised as members of the CGT (a leftist trade union) interacted with people during a demonstration.

=== Russia ===
The activities of agents provocateurs against revolutionaries in Imperial Russia were notorious. Jacob Zhitomirsky, Yevno Azef, Roman Malinovsky, and Dmitrii Bogrov, all members of Okhrana, were notable provocateurs.

In the "Trust Operation" (1921–1926), the Soviet State Political Directorate (OGPU) set up a fake anti-Bolshevik underground organization, "Monarchist Union of Central Russia". The main success of this operation was luring Boris Savinkov and Sidney Reilly into the Soviet Union, where they were arrested and executed.

=== United States ===
In the United States, the COINTELPRO of the Federal Bureau of Investigation included FBI agents posing as political activists to disrupt the activities of political groups in the U.S., such as the Student Nonviolent Coordinating Committee, the American Indian Movement, and the Ku Klux Klan.

The American Civil Liberties Union requested an investigation of Denver Police at the 2008 Democratic National Convention where undercover officers allegedly staged a struggle with uniformed police to be removed from the crowd of protestors, which prompted another uniformed officer to use pepper spray.

A New York City police officer undercover in a 2013 motorcycle rally was sentenced to two years in prison in 2015 for second-degree assault, coercion, riot and criminal mischief for their participation in the gang assault of a man driving an SUV with his family, which had hit a motorcyclist and continued driving.

== Internet ==
The internet has been utilized for information warfare, with many internet trolls acting as agents provocateurs by disseminating certain propaganda. Such tactics are used to further the interests of countries, corporations, and political movements.

== See also ==
- Agent of influence – Person influencing public opinion for a foreign power
- Astroturfing – Public relations tactic using fake grassroots movements
- Bad-jacketing – Planting doubt on an individual's bona fides or identity
- Black bloc – Tactic used by groups of protesters
- Black propaganda – Form of influence campaign
- Character assassination – Deliberate effort to damage an individual's reputation or credibility
- COINTELPRO – Series of covert and illegal projects by the FBI
- Covert interrogation – Interrogation Techniques
- Denial and deception – Framework in military intelligence theory
- Double agent – Type of special intelligence service
- Entrapment – Legal doctrine
- Entryism – Strategy of joining an organization to politically influence it
- False flag – Covert operation designed to deceive
- Fifth column – Group of people who undermine a larger group from within
- Informant – Person who provides information
- Internet troll – Deliberately making offensive remarks online
- Outside agitators – American political term of disparagement
- Paid protester
- Ratfucking – American slang term for political sabotage, especially relating to elections
- Shill – Person who publicly helps or gives credibility to assist in a fraud
- Smear campaign – Effort to damage someone's reputation
- Sting operation – Deceptive way to catch a person committing a crime
- Police riot – Riot caused by the police
- Useful idiot – Derogatory term in political jargon

Agents provocateurs

- Umbrella man (Minneapolis riots) – Aftermath of local civil unrest following murder of an unarmed black man
- Grant Bristow – Canadian spy (born 1958)
- Brandon Darby – American Conservative activist and blogger
- Mark Kennedy (police officer) – British former undercover police officer
- Bob Lambert (undercover police officer) – UK police officer & academic (1952-)
- Terry Norman – American photographer
