= Christopher Pitchford =

British judge

The Right Honourable Sir Christopher Pitchford
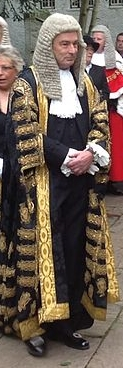
- In procession at Llandaff Cathedral in 2013

Lord Justice of Appeal
- In office 12 January 2010 – 29 March 2017
- Preceded by: Sir Scott Baker

Personal details
- Born: 28 March 1947
- Died: 18 October 2017 (aged 70)

Sir Christopher John Pitchford (28 March 1947 – 18 October 2017) was a senior British judge who was a Lord Justice of Appeal in England and Wales from 2010 until he retired because of ill health in 2017.

Pitchford was educated at Queen's College, Taunton and studied law at Queen Mary, University of London. He was called to the Bar in 1969, becoming a Bencher of Middle Temple in 1996. He became a Queen's Counsel in 1987 and appointed a Deputy High Court judge in 1996. Pitchford was appointed a full judge of that court on 28 September 2000 and received the customary knighthood. He was a Presiding Judge of the Wales and Chester Circuit from 2002 to 2005. On 12 January 2010, Pitchford became a Lord Justice of Appeal, and was subsequently appointed to the Privy Council.

He was appointed to chair the Undercover Policing Inquiry, which was announced by Theresa May, the Home Secretary on 12 March 2015.

He announced that he would step down from the Inquiry in May 2017 following the diagnosis of motor neurone disease, and he died in October 2017.

== See also ==
- List of Lords Justices of Appeal
