= Bob Lambert (undercover police officer) =

UK police officer & academic (1952-)

Bob Lambert MBE
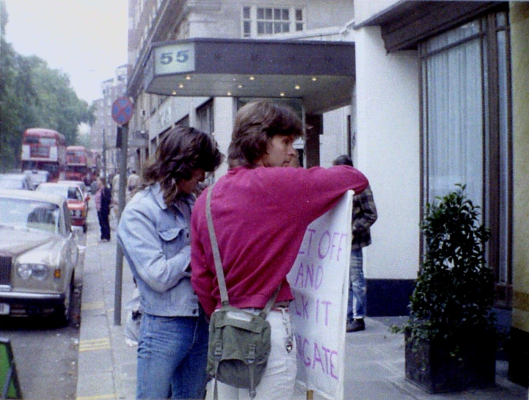
- Lambert at a Unigate protest while undercover
- Born: 15 March 1952 (age 74)
- Occupation: Undercover police officer; Senior lecturer
- Employer: Metropolitan Police (1977–2007)
- Known for: UK undercover policing relationships scandal

Robert Lambert MBE (born 15 May 1952) is a British former undercover police officer and academic. He served in the controversial Special Demonstration Squad and posed as a left-wing animal rights activist from 1983 to 1988. While undercover, he had sexual relationships with four women, fathering a child with one of them, all of whom were unaware of his true identity. The child and the child's mother needed psychiatric treatment after discovering Lambert's identity much later, and both were awarded damages against the police. He has also been accused of involvement in an arson attack while undercover, which Lambert denies, as well as giving false evidence in court.

Until December 2015, Lambert was a lecturer in Terrorism Studies at the University of St Andrews and a senior lecturer at London Metropolitan University's John Grieve Centre for Policing, but was forced to resign after details of his past emerged.

== Career ==
Lambert joined the Metropolitan Police Service in London in 1977 and joined Special Branch by 1980. He was appointed to a management position in the Special Demonstration Squad following his undercover work and was head of the Muslim Contact Unit from its establishment in 2002. Following his retirement as a detective inspector he was appointed Member of the Order of the British Empire (MBE) in the 2008 Birthday Honours for "services to the police".

After his career in the police force, he became a lecturer at the University of St Andrews and a part-time senior lecturer at the London Metropolitan University. Activists mounted a campaign to remove him from these posts. He resigned from them in December 2015. He was co-director of the European Muslim Research Centre in the Department of Politics at Exeter University until August 2011.

== Controversial undercover activities ==
=== Sexual relationships ===
In the course of his police service, Lambert infiltrated activist groups (environmentalists, animal rights activists and anti-racists) using the alias Mark "Bob" Robinson. To gain credibility as an activist, he formed friendships with other movement members; he also embarked on long-term relationships with women as a means of establishing a cover story.

He fathered a child with one of the activists he was spying on although he already had a wife and children. After that relationship ended he embarked on another with a woman who was not politically active. His colleagues at Special Branch raided her home in order to bolster his image as a hardcore militant.

Lambert was confronted about his past activities by members of London Greenpeace (which he had infiltrated in the 1980s) as he spoke at a conference in October 2011. Lambert subsequently apologised to other activists and to the woman whom he had used as a "lover" (who said she felt "raped by the state" after learning about the deception). Though he had earlier denied that reports in The Guardian newspaper were true, in July 2013 he acknowledged that he had conducted four such relationships under false pretences, saying that he "made serious mistakes that I should regret, and I always will do." At the time, he was said to have bragged to a colleague about having fathered a child with one of his targets.

On 23 October 2014, the Metropolitan Police Service agreed to pay £425,000 to a woman called Jacqui whose child was fathered by Lambert; she did not know at the time of their relationship that he was an undercover police officer. The payment was part of an agreement for her to drop her legal action alleging assault, negligence, deceit and misconduct by senior officers. She was a 22-year-old activist at the time of her relationship with Lambert, who was using the pseudonym Bob Robinson, and she gave birth to their son in 1985. When the boy was two years old his father vanished, and she told BBC News she had received psychiatric care after learning the officer's real identity.

The unprecedented payment resulted from a legal battle with women who said they were duped into relationships with officers who were spying on them. Scotland Yard said it "unreservedly apologises for any pain and suffering" but added that "the Metropolitan Police Service has never had a policy that officers can use sexual relations for the purposes of policing". Scotland Yard had previously refused to either confirm or deny whether Bob Lambert was a Special Demonstration Squad operative, despite his own admissions to journalists, but it was forced to change its position in August 2014 after a legal ruling. Lambert did not respond to BBC requests for comment on the settlement but had previously said that he wanted to apologise to women with whom he had relationships and that he had made some "serious mistakes".

The son Lambert fathered with Jacqui has sued the Metropolitan Police Service alleging psychiatric damage. The Met sought to make Lambert a co-defendant in the case. The police paid an undisclosed sum in damages.

=== Accusations of arson and perjury ===
In June 2012, Lambert was accused in Parliament by Caroline Lucas MP of planting the fire bomb that caused £340,000 worth of damage to the Harrow branch of a Debenhams department store in 1987 as part of his undercover work in the Animal Liberation Front. Lambert denied this.

His activities as a police spy came to public attention in the course of revelations that the Metropolitan Police have employed undercover operatives (including Mark Kennedy), some of whom acted in ways designed to disrupt the activities of the groups they infiltrated. The Guardian newspaper has suggested that Lambert might have been prosecuted under his alias, and thus perhaps gave false testimony in court, for having distributed "insulting leaflets" outside a London butcher's shop.

The Derbyshire Constabulary launched an investigation called Operation Herne in 2011 which combined many allegations against the police including this one and those pertaining to the death of Stephen Lawrence. It concluded that errors were made, but stopped at assigning any individual blame as far as this case was concerned.

=== Other controversial activities ===
Lambert's undercover activities also involved using the identity of a boy who had died at the age of seven.

In 2013, it was reported that while undercover with London Greenpeace, Lambert had co-authored the 'McLibel leaflet', which resulted in a defamation lawsuit from McDonald's Corporation that took ten years to resolve.

After his time undercover, he was in charge of other officers in the same role. He deployed officers into Reclaim the Streets as well as campaigns for justice by families of black people whose deaths were mishandled by police, such as Stephen Lawrence.

== See also ==
- UK undercover policing relationships scandal
