= History of Heathrow Airport =

Timeline of airport near London, England

Heathrow Airport street road map

Heathrow layout

In its early years what is now Heathrow Airport was the Great West Aerodrome, sometimes known as Heathrow Aerodrome.

== Before 1920 ==
- About 1410: The first known mention of a semi-rural lane called Heathrow (spelled La Hetherewe). Heathrow divided farmland and heath until 1819 when the heath also became farmland. Specifically, the lane divided the hamlet of Harmondsworth (on the northwestern edge of today's airport) from the 17th and 18th century highwayman's lair of Hounslow Heath (centred roughly where Terminal 3 is today). A little of Harlington, Hatton in Bedfont and Stanwell also fall within the airport's perimeter road.
- 1915: Fairey Aviation, founded by British aero-engineer and plane builder Charles Richard Fairey, started assembling and flight testing its aircraft from Northolt Aerodrome, about six miles (9.7 km) north of the modern Heathrow airport.
- 1917-1919: About 2 1/2 mi (4.0 km) southeast of Heathrow, Hounslow Heath Aerodrome was the only London aerodrome with customs facilities in 1919. After the closure of Hounslow Heath Aerodrome in 1919, Croydon Airport became the principal London Airport.

== 1920s ==
- 1925: Norman Macmillan, a Royal Air Force (RAF) officer, made a forced landing and take-off at Heathrow. He noted the flatness of the land and its suitability for an airfield. The land was at the time used for market gardening and wheat growing.
- 1928: The Air Ministry gave Fairey notice to cease using Northolt. Fairey Aviation needed an airfield for flight testing of aircraft designed and manufactured at its factory in North Hyde Road, Hayes. Norman Macmillan, by then Fairey's chief test pilot, remembered the forced landing and take-off at Heathrow in 1925, and recommended the suitability of the area for an aerodrome. Macmillan flew aerial surveys of the site.
- 1929: Fairey Aviation started by buying 148 acres (60 ha) of farmland in four adjoining plots near southeast of the hamlet of Heathrow from four local landowners, for about £1,500, at the typical 1929 market rate of £10 per acre. (The first plot bought was 71 acres (29 ha) from the Reverend R. Ross, vicar of Harmondsworth.) The site was bounded to the northeast by Cain's Lane, to the south by the Duke of Northumberland's River, and to the west by High Tree Lane. The airfield boundaries were south of the Bath Road (A4 road), northwest of the Great South West Road, and about two miles west of the western end of the Great West Road (A4 road). The airfield was about 3 mi (4.8 km) by road from the Hayes factory.

Areas of land bought at Heathrow, Harmondsworth, Middlesex by Fairey Aviation
Acres (ha)	Date	Purchased from	Name of land
31 January 1929	71 acres (29 ha)	Reverend R. Ross, vicar of Harmondsworth as trustee of parochial church council	
12 February 1929	23.5 acres (9.5 ha)	Reverend J. Taylor & others (ditto)	
4 March 1929	14.2375 acres (5.7617 ha)		Gamble's Farm (+ buildings)
16 April 1929	40.86875 acres (16.53900 ha)	Official Trustees of Charity Land	
16 June 1930	29.25 acres (11.84 ha)		Lowe's Farm
5 January 1939	12 acres (4.9 ha)	F. W. Longhurst	
2 December 1942	38.65625 acres (15.64363 ha)		
1 November 1943	10.40625 acres (4.21126 ha)		
	239.91875 acres (97.09167 ha) in total		

After this list was made, it bought a bit more land, the last in November 1943, extending the southwest border to the Duke of Northumberland's River.

== 1930s ==
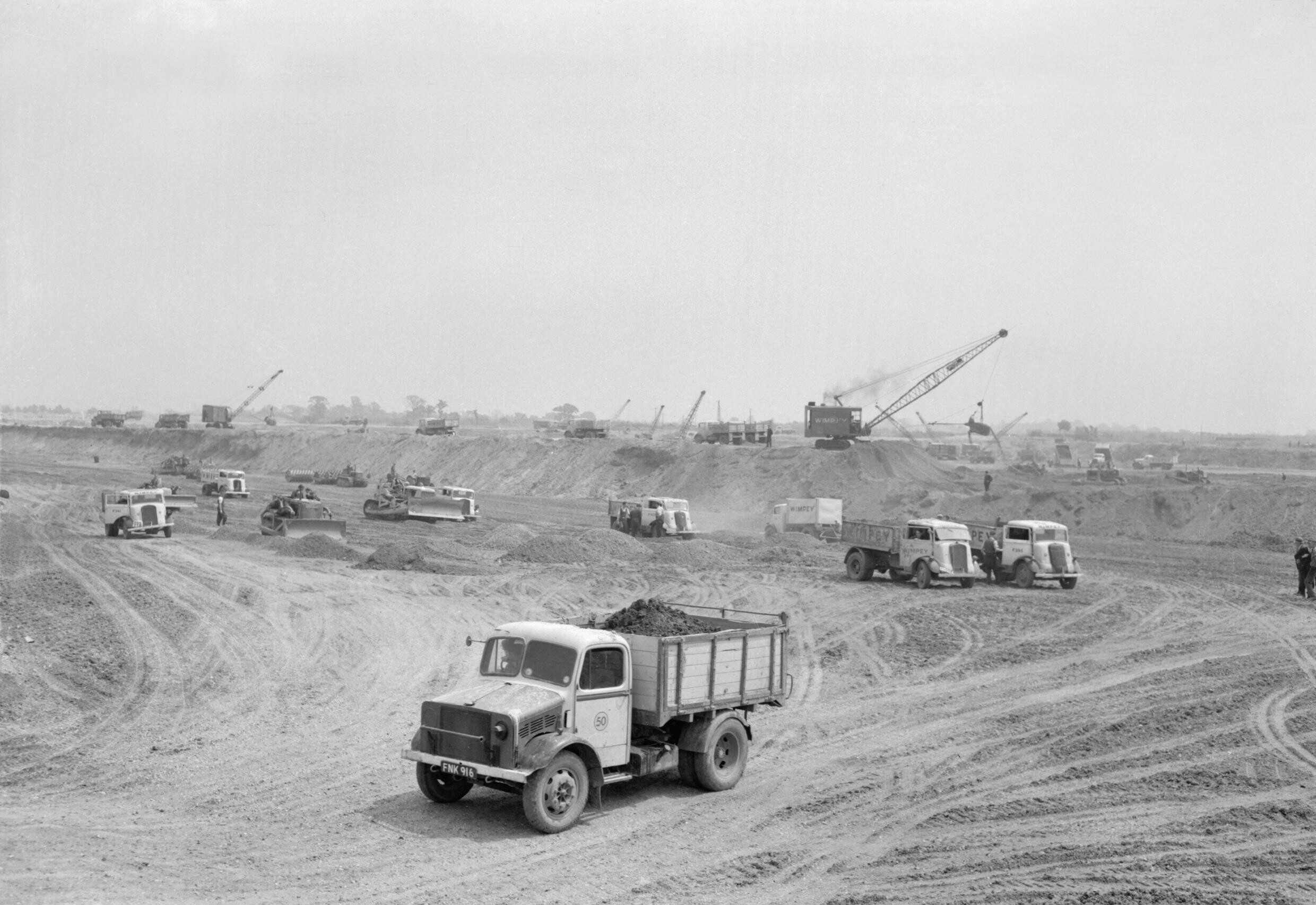
Tipper trucks removing earth from the site of the new main runway at Heathrow, Middlesex. (1939-1945)

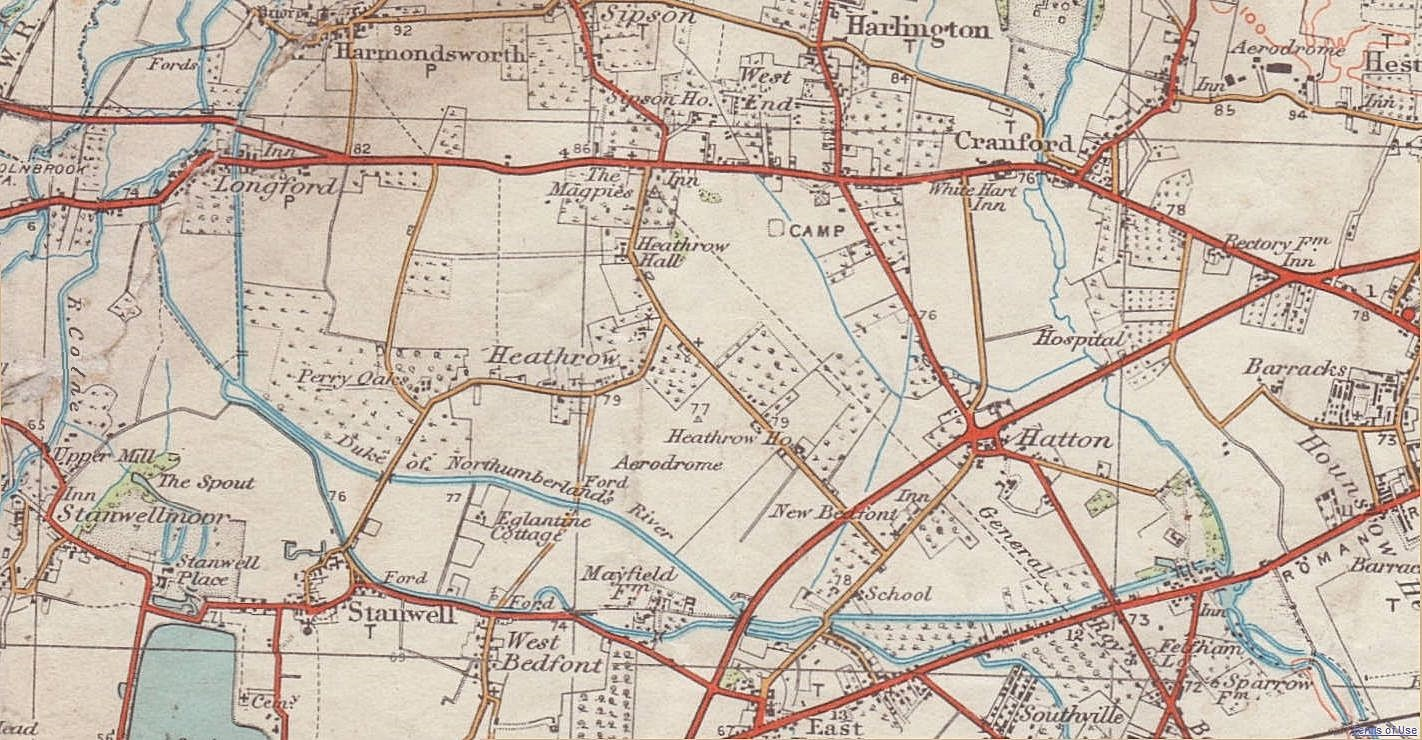
Map of Heathrow and around from the late 1930s

- June 1930: The airfield was declared operational.
- 1930 to 1939: The airfield was first called Harmondsworth Aerodrome, then the Great West Aerodrome, and sometimes Heathrow Aerodrome. One prewar map labels it "Airport". A hangar was built. Fairey planned to relocate its factory at Hayes to the site. The Great West Aerodrome was used for aircraft assembly and testing. Commercial traffic used Croydon Airport, which was London's main airport at the time.
- 1935 to 1939: The Royal Aeronautical Society (RAeS) held its annual garden party fly-ins at Heathrow airfield, at the invitation of Richard Fairey, chairman and managing director of the Fairey Aviation Company Ltd, and a past president of the RAeS. The events were aviation society gatherings combined with promotion and display of aircraft and their manufacturers, before the development of aircraft industry shows in Britain, from 1947. Richard Fairey, who started in business with model aircraft, also allowed weekend use of the airfield by model aircraft clubs. More people were said to visit Heathrow on that one day than they did for the rest of the year.
- 5 May 1935: The first Fairey's air show. A description in The Aeroplane magazine (8 May 1935) calls the place "Heathrow Aerodrome, Harmondsworth".
- 19 June 1936: A meeting of the Aerodromes Committee of Middlesex County Council, among other things, discussed and rejected an idea to have an aerodrome in the Heathrow area "at Harmondsworth near the Perry Oaks sludge works", with later extension by 300 acres (120 ha): reasons against were the presence of the Perry Oaks sewage sludge treatment works and of Fairey Aviation's aerodrome, and the Ministry of Agriculture and Fisheries objecting to loss of first-rate farmland: see Heathrow.
- 14 May 1939: The last Fairey's air show. Its brochure calls the place "Great West Aerodrome, near Hayes", and no mention of Heathrow.

== 1940s ==
- What became the airport was used by the RAF during the Second World War, but only for diversions.
- 1940: Hawker Hurricanes of No. 229 Squadron from RAF Northolt were sent to the Great West Aerodrome while there was a threat of enemy attack on Northolt.
- 1942: Richard Fairey was knighted as Sir Richard Fairey, and held the position of Director General of the British Air Mission, based primarily in Washington, D.C.
- 1943: Fairey Aviation bought 10 more acres (4.0 ha) of land to add to the total of 230 acres (93 ha) bought in 1929, 1930, 1939 and 1942. The company planned to move its factory from Hayes to the aerodrome at Heathrow.
- 1943: The Air Ministry, headed by the Secretary of State for Air (Sir Archibald Sinclair), secretly developed plans to requisition the airfield under wartime legislation – the Defence of the Realm Act 1914. The plans were stated to be designed to suit the considerable needs of long-range bombers, such as the Boeing B-29s of the United States Army Air Forces (USAAF), but they were actually based on recommendations from professor Patrick Abercrombie for a new international airport for London. The project was headed by Harold Balfour (then Under-Secretary of State for Air, later Lord Balfour of Inchrye), who kept the true nature of it hidden from Parliament.
- January 1944: The decision and plans were finally revealed.
  The wartime legislation provided no obligation to pay compensation; Fairey Aviation was offered compensation at the 1939 farming land market rate of £10 per acre; that was rejected. Sir Richard wrote to his co-chairman of Fairey Aviation:
  It is manifestly so much easier for the Civil Aviation authorities to look over the airports near London, that the foresight of private companies has made available, and then using government backing forcibly to acquire them, than to go to the infinite trouble that we had in making an aerial survey to find the site, buying the land from different owners, and then building up a fine airfield from what was market-gardening land. And why the haste to proceed? I cannot escape the thought that the hurry is not uninspired by the fact that a post-war government might not be armed with the power or even be willing to take action that is now being rushed through at the expense of the war effort.
- The Air Ministry requisitioned the aerodrome, although the role that Fairey Aviation was fulfilling in the war effort meant the Ministry of Aircraft Production would only sanction the action if another site could be found for the test flights. Fairey moved to Heston Aerodrome, and stayed there until 1947, when it moved to White Waltham airfield in Berkshire. That proved especially inconvenient for the company, as the airfield was over 20 mi (32 km) from Hayes. As the aerodrome at Heathrow had been bought under the Defence of the Realm Act 1914, it meant the Government did not have to pay compensation when compulsorily acquiring land. Fairey sought compensation through legal proceedings that continued until 1964. Until their conclusion, the former Fairey hangar at Heathrow could not be demolished; afterwards it was used as Heathrow Airport's fire station.
- An attempt by the Air Ministry to take over the Perry Oaks sewage sludge works to fit in the top left corner of a ∇ layout of three runways caused furious exchanges with Middlesex County Council, who had to resist, as that would need first building somewhere else to treat the sewage sludge handled there, and building new connecting sewers, all in wartime.
- 12 February 1944: Winston Churchill objected to the usage of 3,000 men and much effort on the Heathrow project during the run-up to Operation Overlord. The Ministry of Agriculture and Fisheries objected to the loss of good farm and market garden land.
- April 1944: The Air Ministry requisitioned the airfield and surrounding farms, roads and houses, ostensibly to accommodate military bombers. (Harold Balfour (later Lord Balfour), then Under-Secretary of State for Air (1938–44), wrote in his 1973 autobiography, Wings over Westminster, that he deliberately deceived the government committee into believing a requisition was necessary so that Heathrow could be used as a base for long-range transport aircraft in support of the war with Japan. In reality, Balfour wrote that he always intended the site to be used for civil aviation, and used a wartime emergency requisition order to avoid a lengthy and costly public inquiry.) This took over all or part of twenty farmers' and market-gardeners' land-holdings, in total about 1,300 acres (530 ha) initially. Construction of the new airport by Wimpey Construction began.
- May 1944: Eviction notices were issued. Airfield construction work began: demolition of Heathrow domestic and farm buildings, and grubbing out trees and hedges and fruit orchards.

=== After the Second World War ===
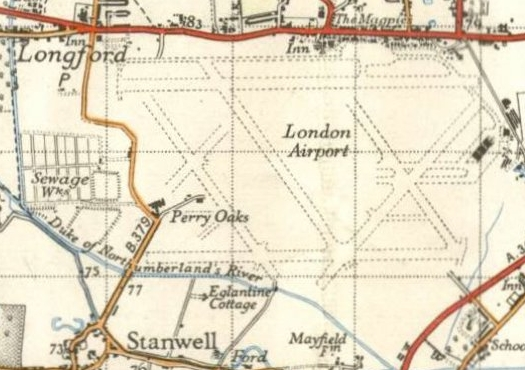
Map, of 1948, showing the passenger aircraft apron next to Harlington Corner, in throwback style showing it east of The Magpies, a 15th century to early 20th century locality of the Bath Road but sometimes named part of Heathrow but omitting mention of Sipson Green which was more populous next to it.

- May 1945: When the Second World War ended, the new airfield was still under construction. Plans had changed from tenuous wartime military use to development into an international airport. A photograph made in 1945< shows the first ∇ layout of three runways, and a perimeter road smaller than the later airport boundary, and the former country lanes still existing, and Perry Oaks Farm and some buildings along Cain's Lane still standing among fields outside this perimeter.
- 1945: several bombers including Lancasters and Halifax were diverted there. No RAF aircraft became based there, although facilities common on RAF bases had been built.
- 1 January 1946: Ownership of the site was transferred from the (military) Air Ministry to the Ministry of Civil Aviation. Inaugural flight on Runway 1, recently completed; Runways 2 and 3 approaching completion. The airport buildings were Army marquees and caravans and prefabricated RAF huts.
- 10 January 1946: The British Cabinet agreed to Stage 3 of the airport, which was an extension north of the Bath Road, with a large triangle of three runways, obliterating Sipson and most of Harlington (Harlington church would have survived on a small spur of land with airport near on three sides), and diverting the Bath Road.
- 25 March 1946: Reginald Fletcher, 1st Baron Winster, the Minister of Aviation, performed the official opening ceremony. The first aircraft to use the new airport was a British South American Airways (BSAA) Avro Lancastrian named Star Light captained by BSAA's managing director AVM D. C. T. Bennett.
  - The passenger terminal was an area of Army tents and duckboarding next to the south side of the Bath Road. Later the tents were replaced by prefabricated buildings. (It was opposite the Bricklayers Arms pub, which in 1954 was renamed the Air Hostess, and in 1988 was demolished.) The first control tower was a crude brick building (three storeys, plus two huts on its flat roof) roughly where the airport police station was later built.
- 16 April 1946: The first aircraft of a foreign airline, a Panair operated Lockheed 049 Constellation, landed after a flight from Rio de Janeiro. The first scheduled flight of the British Overseas Airways Corporation (BOAC) was an Avro Lancastrian headed for Australia on a route operated jointly with Qantas.
- 31 May 1946: The airport was fully opened for civilian use. The first passenger to alight was the war hero Charles Upham.
- 1947: By now Heathrow runways formed a triangle consisting of 100/280 (9,200 ft (2,800 m) long), 156/336 (6,300 ft (1,900 m) long), and 052/232 (6,700 ft (2,000 m) long). A parallel runway farther west soon replaced 156/336 thereby expanding the planned terminal area inside the triangle. The temporary "prefab" passenger and cargo buildings were at the northeast edge of the airport, just south of Bath Road.
- 1948: Perry Oaks farm was demolished.
- 1948 to 1949: Buildings along Hatton Road were demolished, thus likely start of the airport spreading east of Hatton Road.
- A short film made by the Crown Film Unit in 1949, London Airport (available at the Internet Archive), shows the official opening of the airport and the intensive building works. Runway 1 was ready for use but the old Heathrow village area's country lanes were still visible, and Perry Oaks farm and some houses along Hatton Road were still there.

== 1950s ==
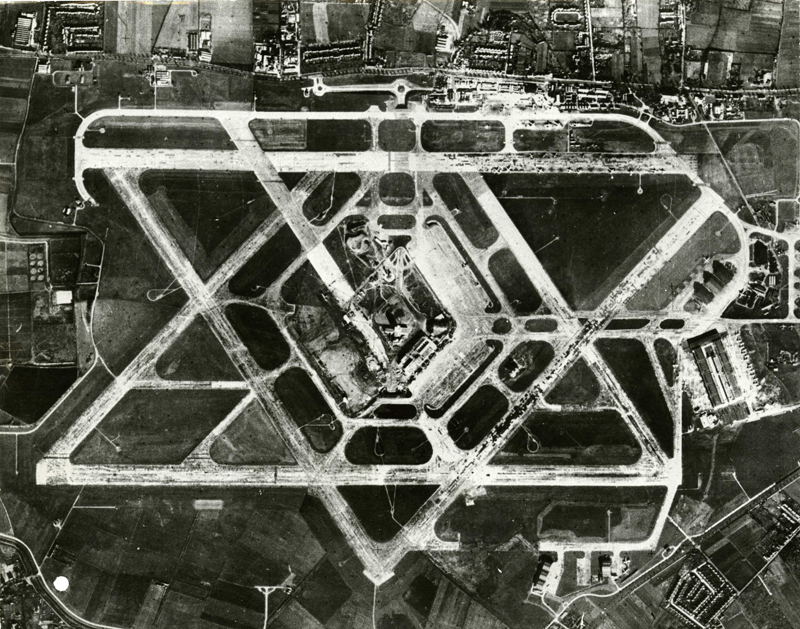
Heathrow Airport, 1955

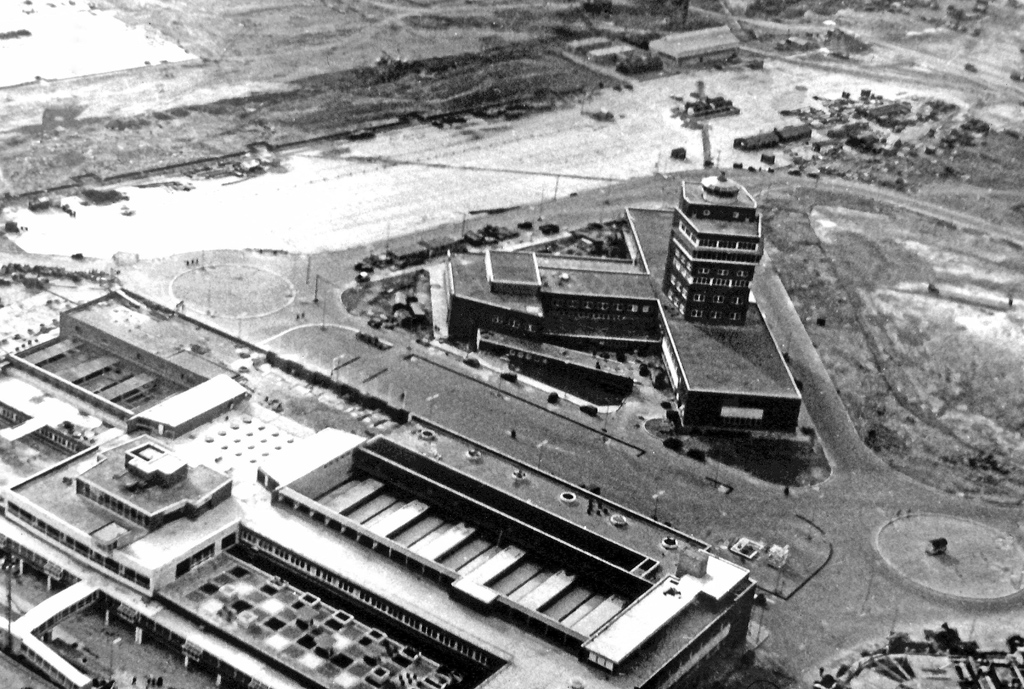
Heathrow's central area under construction in April 1955. The control tower is in use; work proceeds on the Europa Building

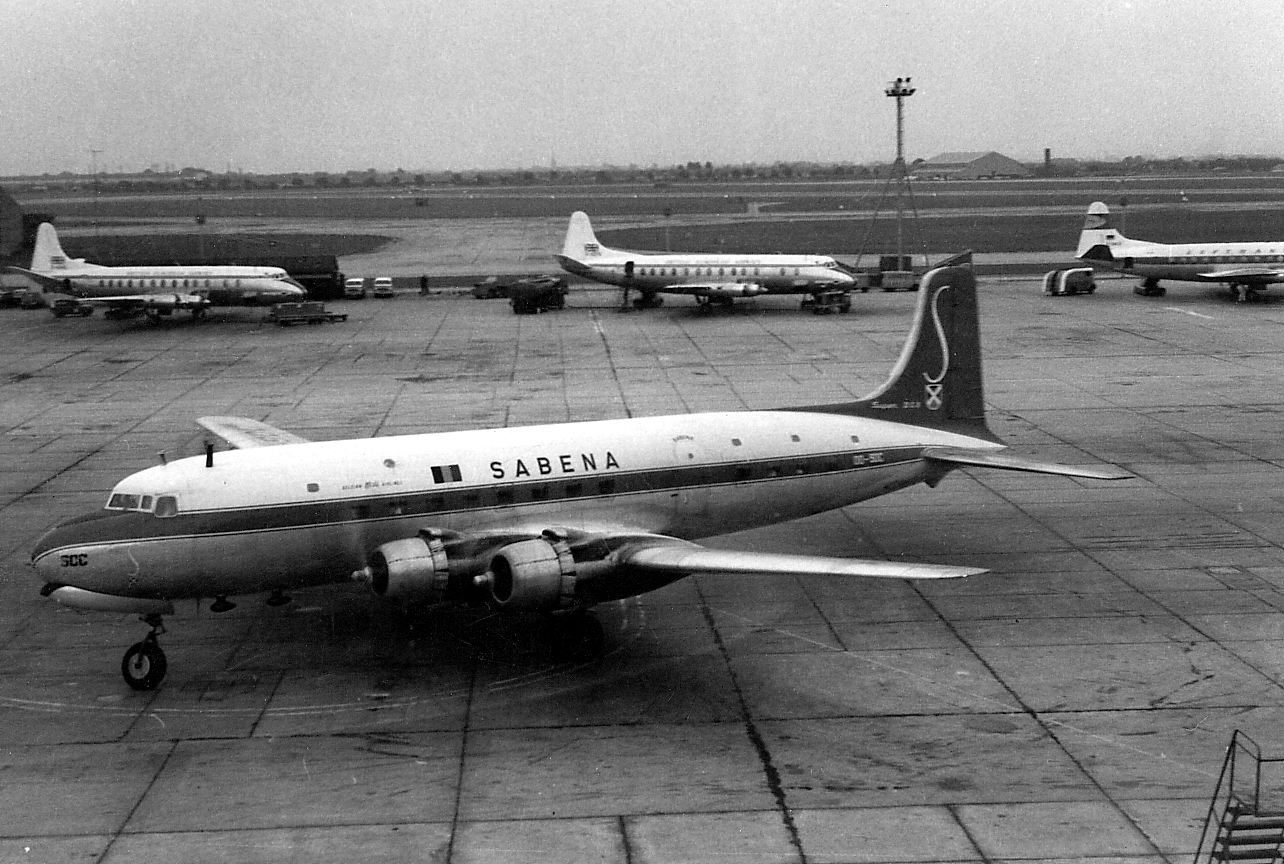
Heathrow in the 1960s; Sabena Douglas DC-6 at front, Vickers Viscounts at rear

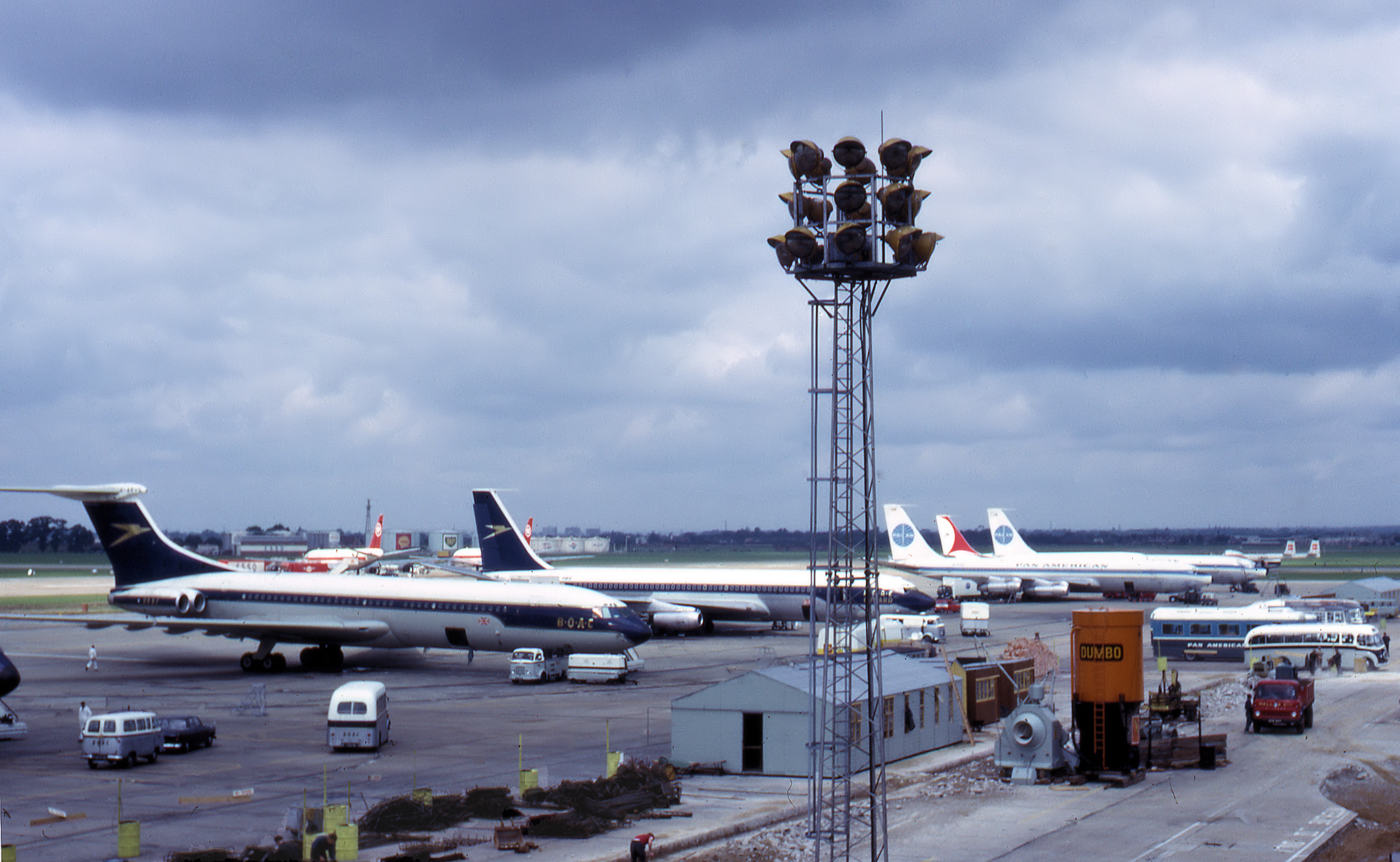
Heathrow in 1965. Nearest the camera are two BOAC aircraft – a Vickers VC10 (with the high tail) and a Boeing 707.

- Early 1950s: Three more runways completed the hexagram; two runways would always be within 30° of the wind direction.
- October 1950: Revision of the northward extension plan: smaller area; part of Harlington reprieved; much of Harmondsworth to be demolished.
- 31 October 1950: BEA Vickers Viking crashes in thick fog.
- 7 February 1952: Princess Elizabeth returned to the United Kingdom as Queen Elizabeth II following the death of her father, George VI. She arrived on the BOAC Argonaut Atalanta, on an area of the airport now covered by the Brasserie Restaurant of the Heathrow Renaissance Hotel.
- 1953: Queen Elizabeth II ceremonially laid the first slab of a new runway that year.
- December 1953: Passenger traffic reached 1 million, with a total of 62,000 flights in the year.
- December 1953: After much protest, the northward extension plan was cancelled.
- 1955: Queen Elizabeth II opened the first permanent passenger terminal, the Europa Building (later known as Terminal 2) as well as the Queens Building. These terminal buildings stood in the central area in the middle of the star pattern of runways and were reached by a twin access tunnel from the Bath Road (A4) passing under runway 10L/28R.
- 1 April 1955: A new 127 ft (38.8 m) control tower designed by Frederick Gibberd opened to replace the original 1940s tower.
- Late 1950s: British European Airways Helicopters ran an experimental helicopter service to Heathrow Central from Waterloo Air Terminal (London's South Bank) and other destinations. The roof gardens on top of the Queen's Building and Europa Terminal were popular with the public, and above the tunnel there was a ground enclosure from which sight-seeing flights operated.
- 1955: The first central terminal building was named Building 1 Europa.
- 1956: The second central terminal building (an extension on Building 1) was named Building 2 Britannic.
- 1957: The West London Air Terminal, a check-in facility for British European Airways, began operations.

== 1960s ==
- 1961: Runway lengths: runway 10L 9,313 ft (2,839 m), runway 10R had been extended west to 11,000 ft (3,400 m), runway 05L 6,255 ft (1,907 m), runway 05R 7,734 ft (2,357 m), runway 15R 7,560 ft (2,300 m), runway 15L not in use.
- 13 November 1961: Building 3, the Oceanic building (renamed as Terminal 3 in 1968) opened to handle long-haul flight departures. The roof gardens on the Queen's Building and the Europa Terminal remained popular.
- Spring 1962: Last scheduled airline flights from London Airport North (Pan Am, Trans World Airlines and Pakistan International Airlines).
- August 1963: Multi-storey car park constructed by Taylor Woodrow opened with a capacity of 1,150 cars and 20 coaches. On opening, it was the largest "public garage" in England.
- 1964: The documentary City of the Air is filmed at Heathrow.
- The legal dispute between Fairey Aviation and the government over compensation, which started in early 1944, was finally settled in the sum of £1,600,000. Fairey's 1930 hangar, in legal limbo for 20 years, and used as the Heathrow Airport fire station and as backdrop for an advertising billboard for BOAC, was then finally demolished.
- 1965: Ownership and control of the airport passes from the Ministry of Aviation to the new British Airports Authority (BAA).
- September 1966: BAA officially renamed the airport Heathrow, to avoid confusion with the other airports serving the city, Gatwick and Stansted.
- 8 June 1968: James Earl Ray, an American criminal convicted of assassinating civil rights leader Martin Luther King Jr., was captured while trying to fly out of the United Kingdom using a false Canadian passport. At check-in, the ticket agent noticed the name on the fake passport, Ramon George Sneyd, was on the Royal Canadian Mounted Police watch list. The United Kingdom quickly extradited Ray to the United States where he was to have his trial in Tennessee, where Dr. King was assassinated.
- 6 November 1968: Terminal 1 opened, completing the cluster of buildings at the centre of the airport site. By this time Heathrow was handling 14 million passengers annually. Then or later, Building 1 (Europa) and Building 2 (Britannic) were jointly renamed Terminal 2.
- 17 April 1969: Queen Elizabeth II formally inaugurated Terminal 1.
  The original terminals being in the centre of the site became a constraint on expansion. Built for easy access to all runways, it was assumed that passengers using the terminals would not need extensive car parking, as air travel was beyond all but the wealthy, who would be chauffeur-driven with chauffeurs leaving with their cars once passengers had departed, or coming back later to collect returning passengers.
- Late 1960s: The cargo terminal was built to the south of the southern runway, connected to Terminals 1, 2 and 3 by the Heathrow Cargo Tunnel.

== 1970s ==
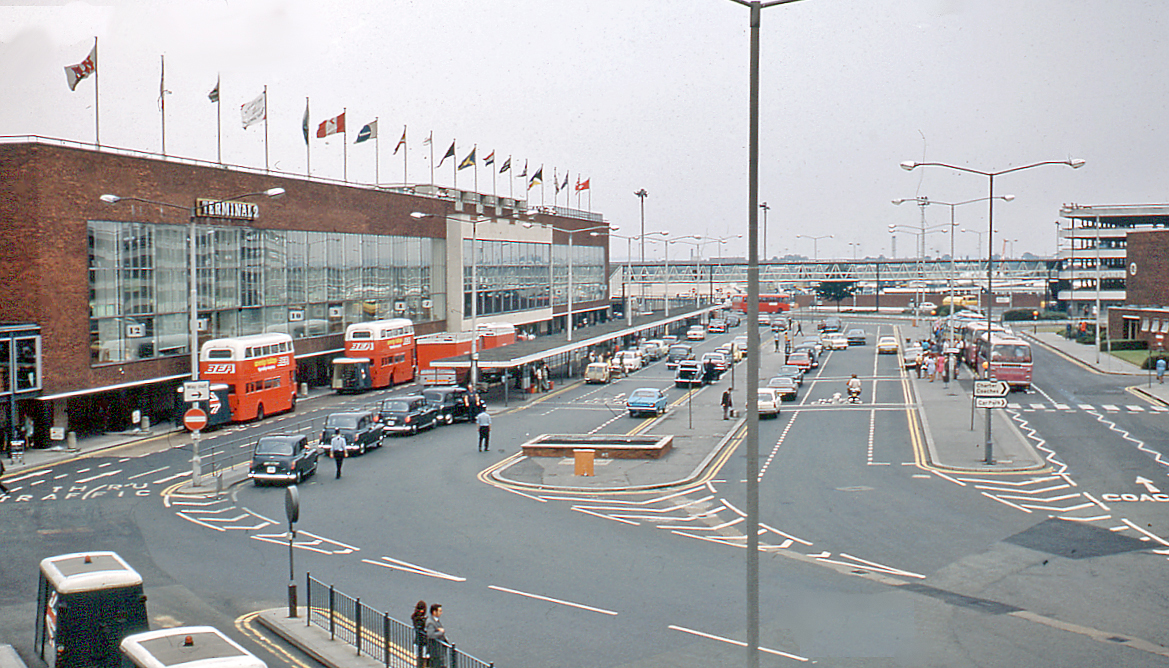
Terminal 2 in 1972

- 1970: Terminal 3 was expanded with the addition of an arrivals building in 1970. Other new facilities included the UK's first moving walkways. Heathrow's two main east-west runways, 10L/28R and 10R/28L (later redesignated 09L/27R and 09R/27L) were also extended to their current lengths to accommodate new large jets such as the Boeing 747. The other runways were closed to facilitate terminal expansion, except for Runway 23, which remained available for crosswind landings until 2002.
- 1973: The truth about the secret Air Ministry plan came out, in Harold Balfour's autobiography (Wings over Westminster).
- 1974: The check-in facilities at the West London Air Terminal close.
- 1974: Heathrow was briefly occupied by the British Army, ostensibly as a training run in case of possible Provisional Irish Republican Army (PIRA) terrorism. However, in a documentary, The Plot Against Harold Wilson in 2006, Baroness Falkender asserted that the government was not informed in advance. The occupation of Heathrow was privately seen at Number 10 as a warning to Harold Wilson by the Army, or even a dress rehearsal for a coup d'etat.
- 19 July 1975: London Underground's extension of the Piccadilly line from Hounslow West opened as far as Hatton Cross.
- 1977: The Piccadilly line opened from Hatton Cross to Heathrow Central, putting the airport just under an hour's journey of Central London.

== 1980s ==
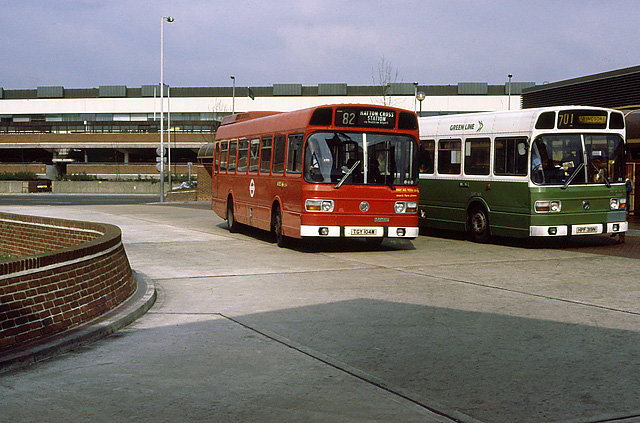
Heathrow Bus Station, 1980. The entrance to the bus station with terminal 1 and its associated arrivals/departures car parking in the background.

- Early 1980s: Annual passenger numbers had increased to 30 million, and required more terminal space. Terminal 4 was built south of the southern runway, on the site of farm or farms called Mayfields and Mayfield Farm, next to the existing cargo terminal and away from the three older terminals with connections to Terminals 1, 2 and 3 by the existing Heathrow Cargo Tunnel. Some open land between Staines Road and Stanwell Road is still called Mayfield Farm.
- 1984: The one-way underground railway loop serving Heathrow Terminal 4 (south of the central terminal area) was added to the London Underground Piccadilly line. Heathrow Central station was renamed Heathrow Terminals 1, 2, 3.
- 20 April 1984: a bomb exploded in the baggage area of T2, injuring twenty-two people including one seriously.
- 1986: The M25 motorway opened in 1986 and provided a direct motorway link to much of the country.
- 1 April 1986: Terminal 4 was opened by the Prince and Princess of Wales, and became the home of the newly privatised British Airways.
- 1987: The UK government privatised the British Airports Authority (BAA) which controlled Heathrow and six other UK airports.
  Following privatisation, during the late 1980s and 1990s BAA expanded the proportion of terminal space allocated to retail activities and invested in retail development activities. This included expanding terminal areas to provide more shops and restaurants, and routing passengers through shopping areas to maximise their exposure to retail offerings.

== 1990s ==
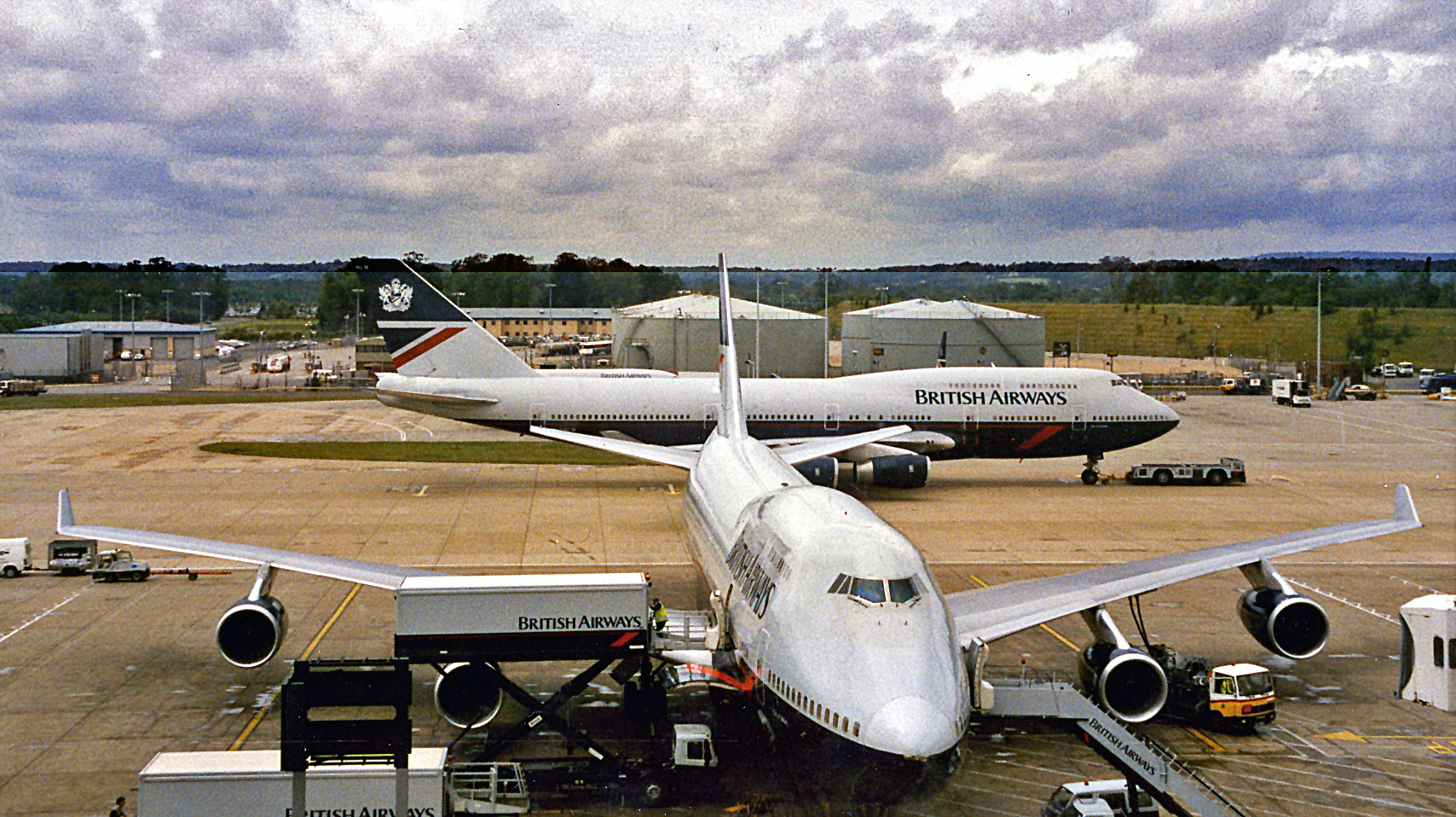
British Airways Boeing 747-400s in the 1990s

- March 1994: Heathrow mortar attacks were carried out by the Provisional Irish Republican Army.
- 7 February 1996: Concorde G-BOAD arrived at Heathrow after crossing the Atlantic from New York in a new record time: 2 hours, 52 minutes, and 59 seconds.
- May 1997: The planning stage of the Terminal 5 Public Planning Inquiry ended at a total cost of £80m. Testimony was heard from 700 witnesses and 100,000 pages of transcripts were recorded. The consultation process took 524 days; eight years elapsed from the first application to final government approval – the longest ever planning process in UK history.
- 23 June 1998: The Heathrow Express began providing a railway service from Paddington station in London. A special rail line was constructed between Heathrow and the Great Western Main Line for this service.

== 2000s ==
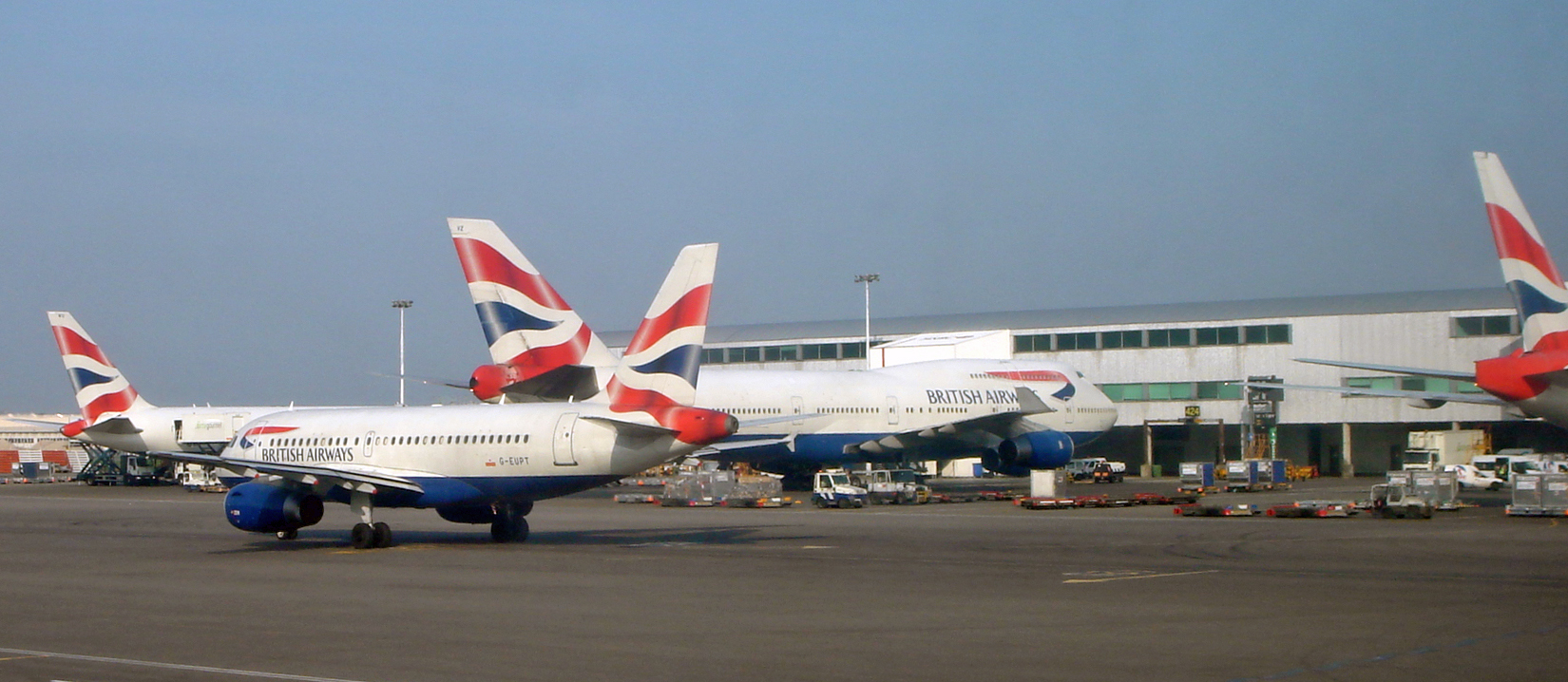
Aircraft at Heathrow in 2007

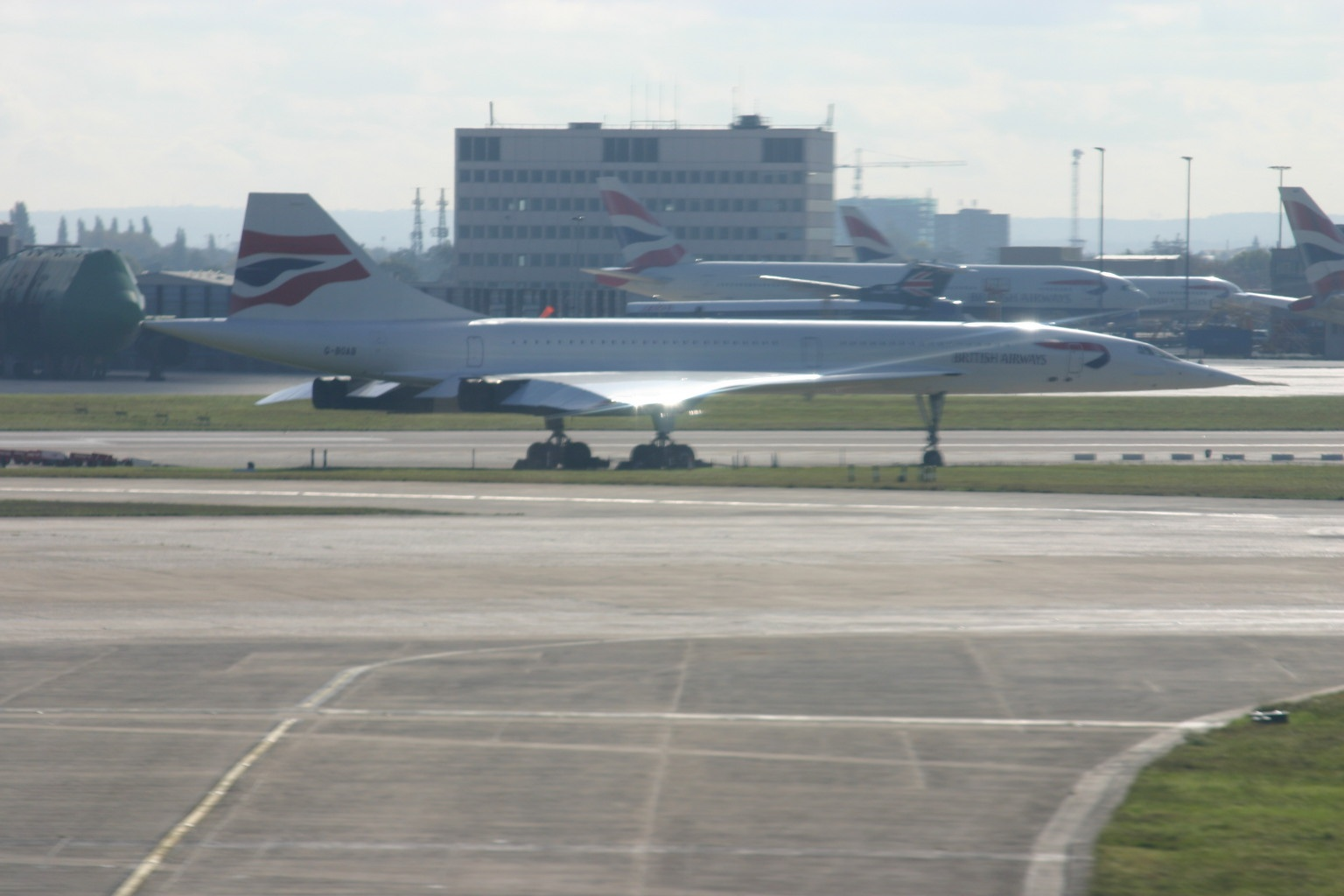
G-BOAB Concorde in 2004, parked at Heathrow

- 2001: 24 smallholdings west of the Perry Oaks sewage works were obliterated.
- September 2002: Construction of Terminal 5 began.
  - Its first stage (which took 18 months) was the Twin Rivers Diversion Scheme, diverting the Longford River and the Duke of Northumberland's River around the western perimeter of the airport, and realigning the A3044 dual carriageway and the Western Perimeter Road.
- 2003: The Army is again briefly deployed to Heathrow, as in 1974 – but this time under the orders of the Prime Minister, Tony Blair. Again, the reasons given relate to terrorism – specifically, intelligence of an "extremely probable" terrorist attack – which, however, never happened in the event.
- 2005: Runway 23, a short runway for use in strong south-westerly winds, was decommissioned. It is now part of a taxiway.
- 2005: The Eastern Extension of Terminal 1 opened.
- 2006: The new £105 million Pier 6 was completed at Terminal 3 in order to accommodate the Airbus A380 super jumbo, and provided four new aircraft stands. Other modifications costing in excess of £340 million were also carried out across the airfield in readiness for the Airbus A380.
- From 7 January 2005 to 17 September 2006: The underground railway loop via Heathrow Terminal 4 was closed to connect a spur line to Heathrow Terminal 5 station. Heathrow Terminals 1, 2, 3 was again a terminus. Shuttle buses served Terminal 4 from Hatton Cross bus station. Briefly in summer 2006, the line terminated at Hatton Cross and shuttle buses also ran to Terminals 1, 2, 3 while the track configuration and tunnels there were altered for work on the Terminal 5 link.
- 18 May 2006: The first A380 test flight to Heathrow arrived.
- 21 April 2007: A new 285 ft (87 m) high £50 million air traffic control tower entered service, and was officially opened by Secretary of State for Transport Douglas Alexander on 13 June 2007. The tower was designed by the Richard Rogers partnership and is the tallest air traffic control tower in the United Kingdom.
- November 2007: A consultation process began for building a new third runway and a sixth terminal.
- 14 March 2008: Queen Elizabeth II opened Terminal 5.
- 18 March 2008: Following delays in the A380's production, the first A380 in scheduled passenger service, Singapore Airlines Flight 380 with registration number 9V-SKA, touched down from Singapore carrying 470 passengers, marking the first ever European commercial flight by the A380.
- 27 March 2008:: Terminal 5 opened to passengers. Heathrow Terminal 5 station opened.
- 2008: Terminal 2B started being constructed.
- 2009: The Queen's Building was demolished.
- 15 January 2009: New third runway and sixth terminal controversially approved by UK government ministers.
- 29 October 2009: British Airways vacated Terminal 4 and moved to Terminal 5.
- November 2009: The first stage of building Terminal 2B completed.
- 23 November 2009: The old Terminal 2 closed.

== 2010s ==
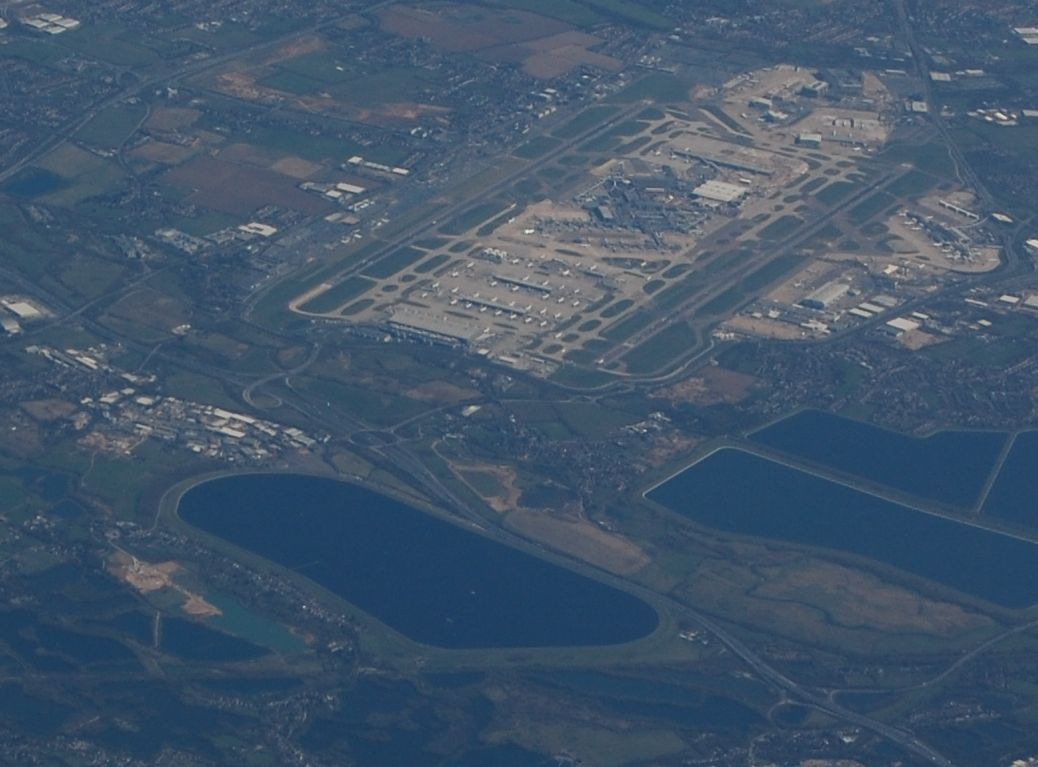
London Heathrow Airport from the air, looking west north-west. Aylesbury Reservoir is in the foreground. (2013)

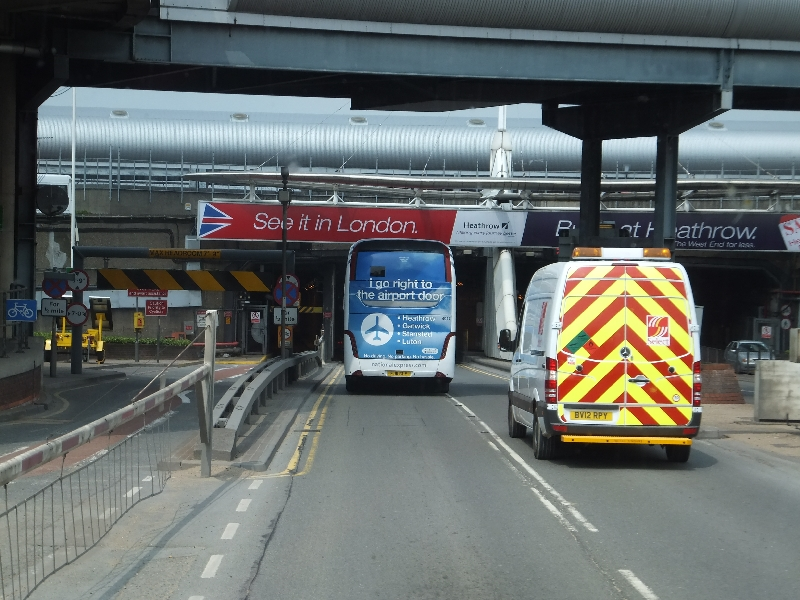
Entrance to access tunnel for terminals 1,2,3 (2012)

- 2010: Terminal 5's second satellite building was completed.
- 12 May 2010: Third runway and sixth terminal cancelled by the new government after an election.
- Summer 2010: The old Terminal 2 was demolished.
- October 2010: The second phase of building Terminal 2B started.
- 20 May 2011: Terminal 5C opened unofficially.
- 1 June 2011: Terminal 5C opened officially.
- February 2012: Construction starts on a temporary new terminal at a staff car park to accommodate the rush of about 7,000 athletes and their non-competing followers leaving when the 2012 Olympics ended. Described as being "the area of 3 Olympic sized swimming pools", it seemed to be made of plastic sheeting on metal posts. After check-in, the passengers were bussed to departures of the permanent terminals where their flights were to depart from. Some of their luggage was checked in at their hotels.
- September 2012: The Airports Commission is founded to consider how best to address the longstanding shortage of airport capacity in South East England, particularly hub airport capacity. The chief options under consideration were to build a third runway at Heathrow, to expand Gatwick Airport, or the suggestion by Boris Johnson, Mayor of London, of a Thames Estuary Airport. These were generally assumed to be mutually exclusive options, although in 2015 the chief executive of the London Chamber of Commerce and Industry recommended expanding both Heathrow and Gatwick, with Heathrow expansion as the first priority.
- 2013: The original 1950s red-brick control tower was demolished to enable access roads for the new Terminal 2 to be laid.
- December 2013: The Airports Commission delivers its interim report.
- 4 June 2014: New Terminal 2 opens to passengers
- November 2014: The large radar located near Terminal 1 was dismantled.
- June 2015: Terminal 1 was closed and demolished in order to allow a second stage of Terminal 2's expansion. The last flights were on 29 June and the terminal closed permanently on 30 June.
- July 2015: The Airports Commission's Final Report on the expansion of airport capacity in the South East of England recommends Heathrow expansion. Controversy arose as statutory exceedances (legal overshoots) in air pollution are forecast beside some motorways and parts of the Bath Road and many more homes impacted by aircraft noise than Gatwick. The Commission opined that any increase in such pollution, if extensively mitigated, should be no bar because there were more populous pockets of London where the pollution levels were currently even worse. Prime Minister David Cameron chaired a Cabinet committee to consider the report. The committee excluded prominent disapproving Cabinet members who were critical of Heathrow expansion, prompting further controversy. The justification for excluding these ministers was that, having previously set out their opinions, they had a conflict of interest. The Conservative Member of Parliament for Richmond Park (heavily centred on a main landing path) and former editor of The Ecologist magazine, Zac Goldsmith, who in July 2015 and polled runner up for 2016-2020 Mayor of London, had vowed to resign his seat in Parliament and against his own party, if Heathrow expansion plans were to be approved by the Government.
- 26 October 2016: Heathrow is chosen over Gatwick as the preferred place to build a new runway. Goldsmith resigned and lost the by-election though he was subsequently re-elected at the next general election as an expansion-critical Conservative.
- 2019: Second phase of the new Terminal 2 complete.

== 2020s ==
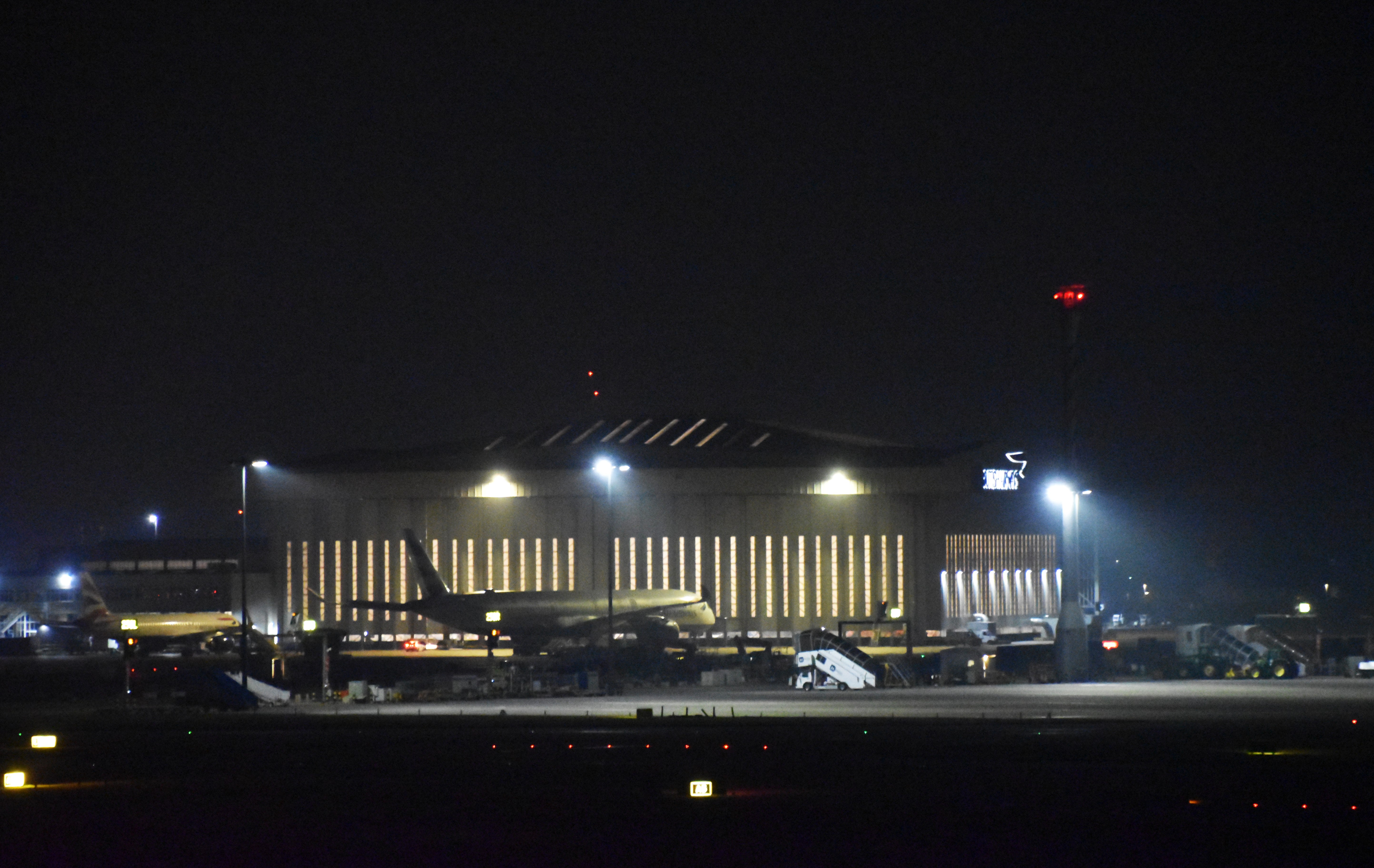
Flight operations at Heathrow Airport (2023)

- 2020: the COVID-19 pandemic damaged the aviation and tourism industry significantly; the airport announced that from 6 April the airport would switch to single-runway operation. It was reported that some 200 homeless people had moved to using Heathrow Airport, as some of the London amenities they were used to using were closed due to the UK lockdown.
- 21 March 2025: a fire at the North Hyde electrical substation, which started at approximately 23:23 GMT the previous night, caused all flights to be cancelled and the airport to be closed on 21 March. More than 1300 flights were affected.

== Plans for future ==
A new terminal building to the west of Terminal 5 and the eventual demolition of Terminal 3 to make way for a series of new satellite terminals. The creation of new public transport interchange points and the consolidation of parking facilities.
