= Costain =

Costain may refer to

- Costain (surname), a surname of English, Scottish and Manx origin
- Costain Group, a British construction and engineering company
- Costain West Africa, a building and civil engineering firm founded in Nigeria in 1948
