= Saxon Tate =

Sir Henry Saxon Tate, 5th Baronet, CBE (28 November 1931 – 11 July 2012) was an English businessman particularly associated with the family sugar business Tate & Lyle, with the Industrial Development Board for Northern Ireland, and the London Futures and Options Exchange.

== Early life ==
He was the son of Lt-Col Sir Henry Tate, 4th Bt and Lilian Nairne Gregson-Ellis, and was born on the dining room table of his grandfather the 3rd Baronet's house in Park Lane, London, taking his Christian name from his maternal grandfather, Saxon Gregson-Ellis.

Saxon Tate went to Eton College, did national service in the Life Guards, and studied history at Christ Church, Oxford before abandoning his studies to start work at Tate & Lyle. He joined the company in 1952, served his apprenticeship in Liverpool at the company's Love Lane refinery (one of the last of the Tate family to do so), and joined the board in 1956.

== Tate and Lyle career ==
From the mid-1960s Tate reorganised a Canadian subsidiary, Redpath Industries, before returning to the UK in 1973 enthused about American management methods, but also aware of rising competition from artificial sweeteners.

He chaired a triumvirate executive committee when British membership of the European Economic Community threatened Tate & Lyle's core business, with quotas imposed from Brussels favouring domestic sugar beet producers over imported cane refiners such as Tate & Lyle. As a result, the company began to diversify into related fields of commodity trading, transport and engineering, and in 1976, it acquired competing cane sugar refiner Manbré & Garton.

By this stage, Saxon Tate was managing director of Tate & Lyle, but his attempts to diversify the business and introduce modern management methods were only partly successful and he was eventually succeeded in 1980 by one of his own recruits, Canadian Neil Shaw. Tate served as vice-chairman until 1982 and as a director until April 1999.

== Later career ==
Tate served for three years as chief executive of the Industrial Development Board for Northern Ireland, successor to the Northern Ireland Development Agency. He then chaired the London Commodity Exchange. This had traditionally traded in sugar, coffee and cocoa but, at Tate's instigation, expanded and rebranded to become the London Futures and Options Exchange. In the 1991 New Year Honours, Tate was appointed a CBE. However, the introduction of real-estate futures contracts in 1991 led to a scandal when it was discovered that trading volumes had been artificially boosted, and in October Tate resigned alongside the executive responsible, Mark Blundell. Today, the Exchange is known as the London International Financial Futures and Options Exchange.

Tate also chaired the Economic League in the late 1970s, and after its demise in 1993 became a non-executive director of one of its successors, CAPRiM.

== Family life ==
Saxon Tate married twice. His first marriage, in 1953, to Sheila Robertson, produced four sons, but was dissolved in 1975. That same year, Tate married Virginia Sturm. The second Lady Tate founded the Tate recruitment agency. He succeeded to the baronetcy in 1994.

He lived for some years in Sychdyn in Flintshire, north Wales, and had a London residence in Cleaver Square in Kennington, before spending his retirement years mainly in the Algarve, Portugal, where he died on 11 July 2012. His eldest son, Edward, born in 1966, inherited the title.

Baronetage of the United Kingdom
| Preceded by Henry Tate | Baronet (of Park Hill); 1994–2012 | Succeeded by Edward Tate |
