= Brian Higgins (trade unionist) =

Scottish trade union official

Brian Higgins (1940/41 – June 2019) was a Scottish bricklayer and trade union official. He moved to Northampton, England, for work and became involved in the socialist Revolutionary Democratic Group and the Union of Construction, Allied Trades and Technicians. Because of his activities in picketing construction sites during disputes Higgins was blacklisted and was unable to find work from 1981.

The existence of the blacklist was exposed by the Information Commissioner's Office in 2009 and Higgins found that his file, running to 49 pages, was the longest on the list. It also showed that he had been subject to undercover investigation by the Metropolitan Police. Higgins afterwards worked to bring anti-blacklisting laws before the European Parliament and gave evidence to the Undercover Policing Inquiry.

== Personal life ==
Higgins was born in Glasgow in 1940/41, the second of seven children of Mary and Dan Higgins. He met Helen Cobain at Rothesay in 1966 and they married in 1968. Higgins originally worked in training on agricultural machinery before he moved to Northampton in England to find work in construction.

Higgins' brother is footballer Tony Higgins who went on to become secretary of the international footballers' union FIFPRO. Higgins had two daughters and was a fan of Celtic FC. He was a member of the socialist Revolutionary Democratic Group.

== Construction and blacklisting ==
During his work in construction as a bricklayer, Higgins became involved with trade union activities, particularly in ensuring that health and safety standards were met. In this role he helped to organise flying pickets. Higgins organised pickets at a large construction firm's site in Northampton in 1975 after a dispute. The union won the dispute but Higgins believes it led him to be added to a blacklist of "troublemakers" in the industry. Blacklisting is illegal in the UK but for decades construction companies used the list to screen potential workers. As a result of his blacklisting Higgins found it harder to find work and found he was unable to work in the industry at all from 1981; being supported on the wage of his wife until his retirement in 2006. He also served as branch secretary for the Union of Construction, Allied Trades and Technicians (UCATT) and helped to provide care for his grandson. Over his career Higgins reckoned he had lost £500,000 of income as a result of being blacklisted.

In the 1980s Higgins and five other workers had been locked-out of a London building site by contractor John Laing Group after a dispute arose over the company's use of lump sum payments for work done, avoiding the need to provide sick pay, holiday pay or pensions to workers. Higgins continued to picket the site in spite of a High Court injunction against him. He spoke about the dispute and protest at a 4 March 1986 Red Action meeting; thanking the group for supporting the picket and talking about his plans to contravene the injunction. The meeting had been infiltrated by an undercover Metropolitan Police officer who passed a report back to the security service MI5.

The existence of the construction industry blacklist was exposed by the Information Commissioner's Office in 2009, by which time it was being run by the Consulting Association (CA). Higgins was then able to access his record, which ran to 49 pages and was the largest on the blacklist. He found that notes in his record showed there had been collaboration between union officials and the blacklist operator and that he had been subject to investigation by undercover police officers from the Special Demonstration Squad.

Higgins afterwards set up a meeting with European Commissioner Laszlo Andor in Brussels that led to anti-blacklisting laws being presented to the European Parliament. He also called for an investigation by Unite (which had absorbed UCATT) into the officials who had collaborated with the CA. Higgins also gave evidence to the Undercover Policing Inquiry and campaigned for its scope to be widened to cover Scotland and Northern Ireland, as well as its original remit over England and Wales.

== Death ==
Higgins died in June 2019, aged 78. As he lay dying in a hospital bed he hallucinated that the rails around his bed were dangerous scaffolding and spoke to advise workers to stop works. He died before the Undercover Policing Inquiry had completed and made its report. In a Scottish Parliament speech after Higgins' death MSP Neil Findlay called him a "working-class hero".
