= Consulting Association =

British business

The Consulting Association
- Predecessor: Economic League
- Formation: 1993
- Dissolved: 2009; 17 years ago
- Location: Droitwich

The Consulting Association (TCA) was a UK business (described by its key figure as "a non-profit making, unincorporated trade association"), based in Droitwich, which, from 1993 to 2009, maintained a database of British construction workers and became implicated in an ongoing "blacklisting" scandal. Revelations about the database resulted in the business being shut down, the Employment Relations Act 1999 (Blacklists) Regulations 2010, a Parliamentary enquiry, High Court actions leading to compensation payouts valued at between £50m and £250m in total, and a series of cases being brought to the European Court of Human Rights.

== Background ==
The Consulting Association was established in 1993 as a successor to the Economic League, which had held the construction industry's blacklist but which had been wound up in 1993 after a parliamentary inquiry and bad press.

Construction company Sir Robert McAlpine Ltd invested a total of £20,000 in founding TCA, buying the previous blacklist database from the Economic League and hiring one of its former employees, Ian Kerr, as manager (McAlpine also invested £10,000 in founding another Economic League spin-off, CAPRiM, on the understanding that they would not interfere with the Consulting Association). In press releases and written testimony submitted to the Scottish Affairs Committee by its director Callum McAlpine, the company claimed that "at least 14" major construction and civil engineering companies colluded in forming The Consulting Association. This was corroborated by Kerr's written statement.

=== Blacklisting ===
The database, often referred to as a "list" in the press and by one of its founders, operated as a blacklist against workers who were active trade union members or otherwise vocal on matters such as health and safety violations by their employers. Many of the workers were on the list having been accused by previous employers of being "troublemakers" or "militant"; other notes in the database referred to subjects' personal and family relationships, and those who had pursued an employment tribunal.

Workers who were on the list allege they were deprived of their livelihoods as a result of their inclusion, with supporters claiming their human rights had been breached. Following initial newspaper reports in 2008, arising out of an investigation into worker dismissals during construction of Manchester Royal Infirmary, and Information Commissioner's Office (ICO) action in early 2009, it emerged that the Consulting Association held files on 3,213 construction workers, including political activists, environmentalists, shop stewards and health and safety representatives (it was later alleged that the 3,213 was only a tiny proportion, and that up to 95% of TCA files were left untouched, leading to speculation, denied by the ICO, that 60,000 workers could have been blacklisted). The list included 240 women, many associated with environmental campaigns, including activist Helen Steel, involved in the 'McLibel case'.

The files included phrases such as "will cause trouble, strong TU trade union", "ex-shop steward, definite problems", and "wears anti-Nazi League badges and insignia", with union membership often the main criterion for inclusion. Strike organiser Brian Higgins had the longest record on the blacklist, running to 49 pages.

=== Member organisations ===
Bovis and G. Percy Trentham were involved at an early stage, but dropped out. The ICO listed over 40 construction companies who were current or previous users of the Consulting Association:

- Amec (Amec Building Ltd, Amec Construction Ltd, Amec Facilities Ltd, Amec Ind Div, Amec Process & Energy Ltd)
- Amey Construction
- B. Sunley & Sons
- Balfour Beatty
- Balfour Kilpatrick
- Ballast Wiltshier
- BAM Construction (HBG Construction)
- BAM Nuttall (Edmund Nuttall Ltd)
- Carillion (Note: Carillion's inclusion in the list was presumably mainly due to its previous ownership of Crown House (acquired by Laing O'Rourke in 2004). Carillion made two voluntary submissions to the House of Commons' Scottish Affairs Committee, one in September 2012, and another in March 2013 relating to its involvement with TCA.)
- Chicago Bridge & Iron Company (CB&I)
- Cleveland Bridge UK Ltd
- Costain UK Ltd
- Crown House Technologies (Carillion/Tarmac Construction) (Note: Crown House was acquired by Tarmac in 1989, and became part of Carillion in 1999 before being sold to Laing O'Rourke in June 2004.)
- Diamond M & E Services
- Dudley Bower & Co Ltd
- Emcor (Drake & Scull) – 'Ex Ref', Emcor Rail
- G. Wimpey Ltd
- Haden Young (Balfour Beatty)
- Kier Ltd
- John Mowlem Ltd (Note: Mowlem was acquired by Carillion in February 2006.)
- Laing O'Rourke (Laing Ltd)
- Lovell Construction (UK) Ltd
- Miller Construction Limited (Note: Miller Construction was acquired by Galliford Try in July 2014.)
- Morgan Ashurst, Morgan Est
- Morrison Construction Group (Note: Morrison Construction was acquired by Galliford Try in March 2006.)
- N. G. Bailey
- Shepherd Engineering Services
- SIAS Building Services
- Sir Robert McAlpine Ltd
- Skanska (Kværner/Trafalgar House Plc)
- SPIE (Matthew Hall)
- Tarmac Group
- Taylor Woodrow Construction Ltd
- Turriff Construction Ltd
- Tysons Contractors
- Walter Llewellyn & Sons Ltd
- Whessoe Oil & Gas
- Willmott Dixon
- Vinci SA (Norwest Holst Group)

It has been suggested that after March 2009 blacklisting may have continued via employment agencies.

== Trade union collusion ==
Ian Kerr described "A particular relationship between an HR manager in a particular area and the regional officer of the union."

An employment tribunal revealed that Liz Keates of Carillion had a meeting with various other employers, and Amicus trade union official, Roger Furmedge, to discuss denying access to work for members of another union, TGWU/EPIU on the Manchester Piccadilly site.

Extract from an individual workers' blacklist file held by The Consulting Association:

Further note via 3293 M.C. BMcA states "He's alright, a good electrician. Ex rugby league player – gave up due to serious injury. Could be a handful if he wants to be." Assumption from this is that BMcA would have indicated if above was sided either with D Simpson or EPIU faction. However, view was "He'll be in the know and be demanding of everything that's due and possibly more". (3292 main contract (I.C.))

Key:

- BMcA = Bernard McAuley, current Unite national officer for construction. Resigned from Union of Construction, Allied Trades and Technicians prior to the completion of the Hand Report into corruption and immediately took up a position in the Electrical, Electronic, Telecommunications and Plumbing Union.
- 3292 = Emcor Rail
- 3293 = Diamond M&E Services
- M.C. = Main Contractors
- I.C. = Ian Coates, previously labour manager for Haden Young and served on the national council for the Heating and Ventilating Contractors Association (today the Building Engineering Services Association)
- D Simpson = Derek Simpson
- EPIU = Electrical Plumbing Industrial Union

Stephan Quant claimed to have brought several trade union officials to his club, the Naval and Military, for a meal. He further claimed that "I had close relationships with UCATT, particularly a bloke called Jeremy Swain in London. I first met Swain in 1991, when he was just a regional officer, so I've known him for 20 years."

In 2013 UCATT executive council announced that, from 2014, industrial relations managers would no longer be invited to conference.

In December 2021, construction union Unite launched a search for evidence of collusion with blacklisting by officers of the union and its predecessors. Its legal advisers were gathering evidence from previous court cases and taking testimony from witnesses for the inquiry. The Blacklist Support Group said: "Over many decades, the senior leadership of construction unions actively encouraged a business friendly model of trade unionism, where cultivating partnership arrangements with employers was often given priority over fighting for workers rights. Overly friendly relationships developed between union officials and managers, this is the context in which information detrimental to union members was being discussed."

In April 2023, Unite launched an independent inquiry to investigate possible collusion by union officials in construction sector blacklisting. The inquiry, led by a fully independent team of lawyers, would examine whether some trade union officers had been aware of, or had colluded with, the blacklisting of their own members.

== Police collusion ==
MI5, Special Branch and the Special Demonstration Squad all spied on trade unionists.

Revelations also pointed to police collusion. In Autumn 2012, the Blacklist Support Group appointed Christian Khan solicitors to submit a complaint over detailed surveillance documented within certain Consulting Association files to the Directorate of Professional Standards. The Directorate initially dismissed the accusations until the Independent Police Complaints Commission (IPCC) stepped in to conduct its own investigation in February 2013. In October 2013, the IPCC confirmed that the police had colluded in the blacklist, saying it was "likely that all special branches were involved in providing information" to the list.

A clandestine National Extremism Tactical Co-ordination Unit (NETCU) police officer attended one meeting with eight company human resource managers.

In March 2015, Home Secretary Theresa May announced that Christopher Pitchford would lead an inquiry into undercover policing. Setting out the inquiry's terms of reference in July, Pitchford said it would "not examine undercover or covert operations conducted by any body other than an English or Welsh police force". The Blacklist Support Group, which along with Ucatt has been given core participant status, has raised concerns that it will be difficult for Pitchford to deliver truth and justice within his stated remit, given that so many allegations refer to dealings between the police and private companies. (Pitchford stepped down from the inquiry in May 2017 following diagnosis of motor neurone disease, and was replaced by Sir John Mitting.)

In March 2018, the Metropolitan Police confirmed undercover Special Branch officers had supplied information to the Consulting Association. The admission followed a complaint by the Blacklist Support Group to the IPCC. Shadow Chancellor John McDonnell said: "It is now abundantly clear that various arms of the state including the Police colluded in the blacklisting process. This is one of the hidden scandals of the abuse of civil liberties in our country that needs to be recognised fully and addressed. The people involved need to be brought to book." The Metropolitan Police told complainants that until the Undercover Policing Inquiry had assessed the evidence, no further action would be taken. In April 2018, the GMB union lodged a Freedom of Information request with Scotland Yard seeking to discover exactly what role the police played in the blacklisting. In June 2018, after the Metropolitan Police failed to respond to the FOI request, the GMB referred them to the Information Commissioner's Office (ICO).

The report showed that police, including Special Branch, and the security services supplied information to the blacklist. An undercover police officer Mark Jenner was also said to have infiltrated the construction union UCATT, gathering intelligence on "over 300 individuals". However, the investigation said the sharing of information did not appear to be systematic.

== Information Commissioner's Office action ==
On 23 February 2009, the company's office was raided by the Information Commissioner's Office, which served an enforcement notice against TCA under the terms of the Data Protection Act. Only 5% to 10% of the material that was available in the office was seized. Files on members of the RMT as well as on around 200 environmental and animal rights activists were among the material that was not seized. The ICO said its action followed a 28 June 2008 article by journalist Phil Chamberlain, published in The Guardian.

The ICO set up a telephone enquiry service for people who suspected they might be listed on The Consulting Association's database, receiving by November 2013 over 4,000 calls. It also wrote to 103 people identified by their address, and received over 1,200 written requests, from which 467 individuals were provided with copies of their information.

An independent Blacklist Support Group, formed in the spring of 2009, campaigned for justice for victims of the database. After mixed results within the tribunal system due to the tight time constraints and employee status placed within legislation, the group took up civil claims which received attention before the High Court of Justice in February 2013. The human rights solicitors Guney, Clark and Ryan (GCR) were entrusted in delivering these multiple cases against the biggest subscriber to the database, Sir Robert McAlpine Ltd; Construction News reported McAlpine was facing a £17 million High Court claim from blacklisted workers.

Ian Kerr was prosecuted for failing to register as a data controller. He pleaded guilty and was fined £5000 in July 2009; he died in 2012. Enforcement notices were issued against 14 construction businesses:

- Balfour Beatty Civil Engineering Limited
- Balfour Beatty Construction Northern Ireland
- Balfour Beatty Construction Scottish & Southern Limited
- Balfour Beatty Engineering Services (HY) Limited
- Balfour Beatty Engineering Services Limited
- Balfour Beatty Infrastructure Services Limited
- CB&I UK Limited
- Emcor Engineering Services Limited
- Emcor Rail Limited
- Kier Limited
- N. G. Bailey Limited
- Shepherd Engineering Services Limited
- SIAS Building Services Limited
- Whessoe Oil & Gas Limited

The pressure group Liberty wrote to the UK Information Commissioner, Christopher Graham, accusing him of inaction over a privacy scandal that it compared to the News International phone hacking scandal. In August 2012, Liberty threatened to take the UK government to court to force an investigation into the case. The legal officer for Liberty, Corinna Ferguson, told The Independent: "We can't believe the inaction of the Information Commissioner on a human-rights violation of such wide public interest."

== Scottish Affairs Select Committee inquiry ==
The Scottish Affairs Select Committee convened an inquiry.

Key witnesses including the late Ian Kerr and Cullum McAlpine gave evidence relating to the Consulting Association. McAlpine was the founding chair at its inception in 1993 and remained as chair for four years, having been invited, he said, by Percy Trentham who wanted a major civil engineering contractor to front TCA. McAlpine also stated that his company paid the £5,000 fine handed down to Ian Kerr in 2009 upon being found guilty of failing to register TCA under data protection laws. McAlpine also admitted in his evidence that names of potential employees were checked against the database of names for work on the multimillion-pound 2012 Summer Olympics up until as late as the autumn of 2008.

McAlpine projects where workers were vetted by TCA included: Colchester Garrison, shopping centres in Bristol and Leicester, an MoD project on Salisbury Plain, the M74 link road, the Quarter Mile project in Edinburgh, the Marie Curie Centre in Glasgow, and groundworks for the Olympic Stadium.

An interim report from the committee was published in March 2013, stating the committee intended to continue examining what happened in the past and to launch consultations on further topics including: whether blacklisting continues, compensation issues, penalties for blacklisting, and potential legislative changes.

The committee published its final report in March 2015. While acknowledging that some positive steps had been taken, it said "many questions in relation to the practice of blacklisting remain unanswered", and recommended a full public inquiry as a matter of priority in the new Parliament.

== Crossrail ==
In 2012 the multibillion-pound London Crossrail project faced accusations and evidence that blacklisting was still being practised, on the biggest construction contract in Western Europe. Crossrail's industrial relations manager Ron Barron, employed by Bechtel, had routinely cross-checked job applicants against the Consulting Association database. An employment tribunal in 2010 had heard that he introduced the use of the blacklist at his former employer, the construction firm Chicago Bridge & Iron Company (CB&I), and referred to it more than 900 times in 2007 alone. He was found to have unlawfully refused employment to Philip Willis, with aggravated damages awarded because Barron had added information about Willis to the blacklist.

In May 2012, a BFK manager challenged their subcontractor, Electrical Installations Services Ltd. (EIS), saying that one of their electricians was a trade union activist. Some days later, Pat Swift, the HR manager for BFK and a regular user of the Consulting Association, again challenged EIS. EIS refused to dismiss their worker and lost the contract. Flash pickets were held at the Crossrail site and also at the sites of the BFK partners. The Scottish Affairs Select Committee called on the UK Business Secretary, Vince Cable, to set up a government investigation into blacklisting at Crossrail.

Further allegations of blacklisting against Crossrail were made in Parliament in September 2017, and in a High Court action settled out of court in December 2021.

== Consequences ==
=== Construction Workers Compensation Scheme ===
In addition to the court proceedings against Ian Kerr and the enforcement actions taken by ICO, on 10 October 2013, eight construction firms which had been involved in the blacklist apologised for their actions, and agreed to pay compensation to affected workers; the Construction Workers Compensation Scheme was established in July 2014. The eight firms were Balfour Beatty, Carillion, Costain Group, Kier Group, Laing O'Rourke, Sir Robert McAlpine, Skanska and Vinci SA. However, affected workers said their legal action for compensation would continue; the eight firms backing the compensation scheme were joined in the court action by Amec and BAM. The GMB union declared the compensation scheme a "PR stunt", while the final report of the Scottish Affairs Select Committee described the scheme's launch as "a deliberate attempt to mislead" and "an act of bad faith".

In May 2019, eight firms who paid into the compensation fund threatened legal action to get Amec (now Amec Foster Wheeler) to contribute, but the company's owner, John Wood Group, argued it was not culpable, saying Amec's construction-related businesses were all sold or wound up in 2007.

=== High Court action ===
More than six years after the 2009 ICO raid, nearly half the 3,213 people with Consulting Association records had yet to be traced. Further employment tribunals were scheduled during 2015, claims to the European Court of Human Rights were waiting to be heard, and a High Court case was originally scheduled to be heard in May 2016.

In October 2015, during preliminary stages of the High Court case, the eight firms were reported to have admitted liability and to have apologised, but the case was set to continue as the companies did not accept the loss of earnings that the victims of blacklisting had suffered. In January 2016, the companies increased compensation offers to victims of blacklisting as the High Court action loomed, but the Blacklist Support Group said "Many blacklisted workers have point blankly rejected the insulting offers and are determined to carry on to full trial." On 22 January 2016 the High Court ordered 30 construction firms to disclose all emails and correspondence relating to blacklisting by 12 February 2016 after it emerged that managers at Balfour Beatty referred to blacklisted workers as 'sheep'.

=== Settlements ===
However, some settlements were eventually agreed. In February 2016, the UCATT union said 71 of its members had received a full and final settlement for compensation (for breach of confidence/misuse of private information, breach of the Data Protection Act 1988, defamation and loss of earnings), receiving a total of £5.6m between them; the average settlement was around £80,000, with some settlements as high as £200,000. A further £15-20m plus legal costs was paid out to 180 workers up to mid-April 2016. That same month it was reported that Cullum McAlpine had refused to appear as a witness in the High Court hearing, a Unite union claim disputed by Sir Robert McAlpine.

At the time of the February 2016 payouts, UCATT was still negotiating a further 89 cases ahead of the scheduled May 2016 trial; in April 2016, the Blacklist Support Group said 154 live claims remained plus 82 recently issued new claims. At the end of April 2016, the eight construction firms settled the litigation between them and individuals represented by UCATT, GMB and legal firm GCR; blacklisted workers represented by the Unite union had yet to settle. The High Court hearing relating to around 90 victims represented by Unite was subsequently postponed, and settlement of these cases was then reported on 9 May 2016, with 97 workers receiving payouts of between £25,000 and £200,000, bringing the total payout to Unite members to over £10m (a later report said Unite had secured a payout of £20m on behalf of 400 members). The GMB said its settlement was £5.4m, shared by 116 blacklisted workers, with individual payouts ranged from £10,000 to £200,000; full legal costs of almost £3m were also reclaimed from the companies in this settlement. On 11 May 2016, a "formal apology" from the forty firms involved was read out in court and the case (Various Claimants v McAlpine & Ors) was brought to a close.

Estimates of the total cost of settlements (including union-achieved settlements, those won by legal firm GCR which secured £6.6m for 167 victims, plus payments via the Construction Workers Compensation Scheme) ranged from £50m to £75m (covering 771 workers, awarded an average of £65,000; plus legal costs on both sides estimated at £25m) to £250m (based on a Morning Star figure). One of the contributors to the Construction Workers Compensation Scheme, Carillion reported in August 2016 "a non-recurring operating charge of £10.5 million" representing the compensation and associated costs it expected to pay under the scheme.

=== Cover-up allegations ===
The legal settlements meant the construction firms were spared from public revelations about their involvement with the Consulting Association, but allegations that Sir Robert McAlpine and others had engaged in a cover-up continued. However, the victims were set to demand a police investigation into claims that key executives tried to pervert the course of justice.

=== Further legal action and settlements ===
Victims of the Consulting Association blacklist continued to come forward, and in May 2017 Unite was reported to be instigating a fresh court case involving over 60 members. In May 2019, the Unite union secured a further £1.9m in compensation for 53 blacklisted workers. The same seven construction businesses also agreed to pay £230,000 for a Unite training fund to help those affected by the vetting system, and paid Unite's legal fees.

In December 2017, Unite announced it had issued high court proceedings against four former chairmen of the Consulting Association, alleging breach of privacy, defamation and Data Protection Act offences. The action was taken against David Cochrane and Cullum McAlpine (both formerly employed by Sir Robert McAlpine), Danny O’Sullivan (of Kier) and Stephen Quant (of Skanska). Unite also said it was taking action against 12 major contractors including Sir Robert McAlpine, Skanska, Laing, Kier, Balfour Beatty, Costain and Carillion. Unite was keen to get Cullum McAlpine to give evidence in court under oath at a trial set to begin on 4 June 2019, but in May 2019 it was reported he would not give evidence.

== Continued blacklisting ==
Since the May 2016 legal settlements, Unite has continued seeking compensation for those denied work due to industry-wide blacklisting, compiling a dossier on contemporary blacklisting. This includes potential cases of blacklisting on major flagship projects, raising concerns that employment agencies may be operating their own blacklists. Unite has asked the ICO to re-open its blacklisting investigation.

== See also ==
- UK labour law
- Employment Relations Act 1999 (Blacklists) Regulations 2010
