= Blacklist (employment) =

List of people not to hire

In employment, a blacklist or blacklisting refers to denying people employment for either political reasons (due to actual or suspected political affiliation), due to a history of trade union activity, or due to a history of whistleblowing, for example on safety or corruption issues. Blacklisting may be done by states (denying employment in state entities) as well as by private companies.

The first published reference to blacklisting of an employee dates from 1774. This became a significant employment issue in American mining towns and company towns, where blacklisting could mean a complete loss of livelihood for workers who went on strike.

== United States ==
The 1901 Report of the Industrial Commission stated "There was no doubt in the minds of workingmen of the existence of the blacklisting system, though it was practically impossible to obtain evidence of it." It cited a news report that in 1895 a former conductor on the Atlantic and Pacific Railroad committed suicide, having been out of work ever since a strike: "Wherever he went the blacklist was ahead of him".

The National Industrial Recovery Act of 1933 gave employees the right to organize and bargain collectively and numerous strikes occurred until the Act was declared unconstitutional by the Supreme Court in 1935, and organized labor sought relief from employers who had been able to blacklist union members. Though the National Labor Relations Act of 1935 outlawed punitive blacklists against employees who supported trade unions or criticised their employers, the practice remained common. A U.S. Department of Labor and Bureau of Labor Statistics report published in 1938 noted that "Closely related to discrimination and the employer's right to discharge is the blacklist." Employees who had been fired had no recourse to legal action against the employer, but "most States have statutes which make criminal the establishment of a blacklist."

The Taft-Hartley Act of 1947 made amendments which sustained blacklisting by affirming the right of employers to be anti-union, and by requiring trade union leaders to make loyalty oaths which had the same effect as the Hollywood blacklist.

=== Hollywood blacklist ===
An investigation was launched in 1947 by the House Un-American Activities Committee (HUAC) into Communist influence on the motion picture industry. The first in the film industry to be blacklisted, as a result of their refusal to provide evidence to HUAC, were a group known as the Hollywood Ten, most of them screenwriters, who had at one time or another been members of the American Communist Party. The best known of the Hollywood Ten are the writers Ring Lardner, Jr. and Dalton Trumbo, who was barred from openly working in Hollywood for over a dozen years as a result of his defiance of HUAC. Trumbo continued to work under pseudonyms and "fronts" until the revelation in 1960 that he had written the script for Spartacus. Actor John Garfield was one of the Hollywood performers to have been blacklisted by major American film studios as a direct result of HUAC investigations and hearings.

=== US real estate appraisers ===
On October 16, 2008, Capitol West Appraisers filed a class action lawsuit against Countrywide Financial Corp. (now owned by Bank of America) alleging Countrywide blacklisted appraisers who refused to appraise real estate at inflated prices.

In Capitol West v. Countrywide Financial Corp., Capitol West Appraisals alleges Countrywide pressured appraisers to set the value of a property at the selling price rather than setting the value based on an inspection of the property and comparable market prices in the area as required by appraisal standards. Misrepresenting the value of a property allowed Countrywide to lend more money to more buyers at higher risks with less collateral. Countrywide could then make more money off the loans by selling them on secondary markets as mortgage backed securities.

Appraisers who refused to misrepresent property values were put in a "do not use" or "Field Review List" data base, in essence a blacklist. When an appraisal was submitted by an appraiser on the "do not use" database it was flagged for "field review". A field review is a review of the original appraisal. All field reviews were conducted by Landsafe, a subsidiary of Countrywide, who would consistently shoot holes in any appraisal from a blacklisted appraiser. Mortgage brokers were then required to get a second appraisal from another appraiser. Since independent mortgage brokers did not want to pay for two appraisals and did not know which lender they would ultimately use, and since Countrywide was the biggest home mortgage lender in the U.S., brokers simply would not use anyone on the Field Review List.

As of August 28, 2008, more than 2,000 names were on the Field Review List, Countrywide's blacklist, which it sends to mortgage brokers who hire appraisers across the United States.

== United Kingdom ==
Blacklisting in relation to trade union activity is illegal in the UK under the Employment Relations Act 1999 (Blacklists) Regulations 2010.

Trade union members, and workers who raised health and safety and other concerns in the United Kingdom have been blacklisted by employers. They used the services of the Economic League, which operated between 1919 and 1993, and The Consulting Association, which, until it was closed down in February 2009, took over this role within the UK construction industry. However the Information Commissioner's Office was subsequently criticised for failing to take further punitive action against the employers using the blacklist, or carrying out any further investigation.

However, the Scottish Affairs Select Committee subsequently began calling for evidence in relation to blacklisting, producing an interim report in March 2013 and a final report in 2015. Whilst the inquiry was underway, the Scottish Government issued an instruction relating to public procurement which stated that "any company which engages in or has engaged in the blacklisting of employees or potential employees should be considered to have committed an act of grave misconduct in the course of its business and should be excluded from bidding for a public contract unless it can demonstrate that it has taken appropriate remedial steps". The legal position in the Scottish Public Contracts Regulations of 2012 stated that "a business which committed an act of grave misconduct in the course of [its] business or profession" could be so excluded ("A contracting authority may treat an economic operator as ineligible ..."). Current regulations as of September 2023 state that a company which breaches the 2010 regulations is to be excluded from procurement processes for a period of three years unless it can provide satisfactory evidence of having corrected its procedures or that exclusion would not be a proportionate remedy. Corrective action must "in all cases" include issuing an apology. While acknowledging that some positive steps had been taken, the Select Committee's report said "many questions in relation to the practice of blacklisting remain unanswered", and recommended a full public inquiry as a matter of priority.

== Norway ==
Blacklisting was used in Norway before the Second World War. Well-known blacklisted trade unionists include Thorolf Bugge.
