= Costin =

Costin is a surname which derives from the Middle English and Older Scots personal name "Costin", a shortened form of Old French Constantine, Anglo-Norman French Costetin, and the Latin Constantinus.

The name origins lie in Anglo-French roots, from "casteyn", which means "chestnut".

It may also be a variant of Costain, a Manx origin surname.

Notable people with the name include:

- Brandon Costin, Australian rugby league player
- Darren Costin (born 1966), English musician
- Doug Costin (born 1997), American football player
- Frank Costin (1920–1995), British automotive engineer
- Henry Gilbert Costin (1898–1918), United States Army soldier and Medal of Honor recipient
- Jamie Costin (born 1977), Irish racewalker
- Mike Costin, British automotive engineer
- Thomas P. Costin Jr. (1926–2025), American politician
- William Costin (c. 1780 – 1842), early American civil rights activist in Washington, D.C.

== Romanian version ==
It is also a surname and given name in the Romanian language.

Surname:

- Gheorghe Costin (born 1955), Romanian conductor and composer
- Ion Costin (1887–1940), Moldovan politician
- Miron Costin (1633–1691), Moldavian chronicler
- Nicolae Costin (1936–1995), Moldovan politician
- Nicolae Costin (chronicler) (1660–1712), Moldavian chronicler
- Robert Costin, British classical organist, teacher and conductor
- Raul Costin (born 1985), Romanian footballer
- Sergiu Costin (born 1978), Romanian footballer

Given name:

- Costin Alamariu (born 1980), Romanian-American writer and an internet personality
- Costin Curelea (born 1984), Romanian footballer
- Costin Gheorghe (born 1989), Romanian footballer
- Costin Lazăr (born 1981), Romanian footballer
- Costin Miereanu (1943–2025), Romanian-born French composer and musicologist
- Costin Nenițescu (1902–1970), Romanian chemist
- Costin Petrescu (musician) (born 1949), Romanian rock musician
- Costin Petrescu (painter) (1872–1954), Romanian painter
