= Costain Group =

British construction and engineering public limited company

Costain Group plc
- Type: Public limited company
- Traded as: LSE: COST
- Industry: Construction, civil engineering
- Founded: 1865
- Founder: Richard Costain
- Headquarters: London, England
- Key people: Kate Rock, Chair; Alex Vaughan, CEO
- Revenue: ▼£1,045.7 million (2025)
- Operating income: ▲£44.4 million (2025)
- Net income: ▲£37.3 million (2025)
- Number of employees: 3,600 (2026)
- Website: www.costain.com

Costain Group plc is a British construction and engineering company headquartered in London, England.

It was established by Richard Costain and Richard Kneen in 1865, initially operating as builders in and around Lancashire. During the early 20th century, Costain expanded geographically, its main activities comprising housebuilding and mining. A separate London-based company was formed in 1923 by the Costain family and was floated on the London Stock Exchange ten years later. Shortly thereafter, Costain moved into civil engineering activities, such as its work on the Trans-Iranian Railway. During the Second World War, Costain helped build several Royal Ordnance Factories, airfields, and worked on the Mulberry harbour units.

By the start of the 1970s, Costain was building around 1,000 houses per year. During this decade, it benefitted greatly from a construction boom in the Middle East; profits increased from little more than £1m per year to £47m within a decade. During the 1980s, Costain invested its resources into coal mining, international housing and commercial property; however, both the housing and property markets, and thus the business, were heavily impacted by the early 1990s recession, which led to sell-offs and cutbacks, especially housebuilding, which reoriented Costain towards the construction sector. Despite the company's fiscal difficulties, it (as part of the TransManche Link consortium) completed construction of the Channel Tunnel, which was at the time the most expensive construction project ever proposed at a final cost amounted to £9 billion (equivalent to £19 billion in 2025). Into the 21st century, it has worked on numerous complex civil engineering and commercial construction projects and has been involved in various Private Finance Initiative (PFI) schemes.

Costain's operations have occasionally been a subject of controversy. It used to be a subscriber to the United Kingdom's Consulting Association, which was an illegal construction industry blacklist; legal action was taken against the company in this matter during the 2010s. In 2019, Costain was suspended from the UK Government's Prompt Payment Code after failing to pay suppliers on time.

It is listed on the London Stock Exchange and is a constituent of the FTSE 250 Index.

== History ==
=== 19th century ===
The business was founded in 1865 when Richard Costain and his future brother-in-law, Richard Kneen, left the Isle of Man and moved to Liverpool as jobbing builders. Their partnership lasted until 1888, at which point Richard Kneen left and Richard Costain's three sons (Richard, William and John) joined him. Costain gradually expanded through Lancashire; by the outbreak of the First World War, it was building its presence in South Wales, where it built numerous houses for munitions workers.

=== 20th century ===
Following the First World War, Costain began to develop housing estates in Liverpool on its own account, primarily to offer continuity of employment to its workforce. With housing sites in Liverpool in short supply, Richard Costain sent his son William down to London to find new sites. He purchased the Walton Heath Land Company, and in 1923, the separate business of Richard Costain & Sons was formed.

Several executive estates in the Croydon area were developed in the middle of the 1920s. In 1929, William died: the other two brothers remained in Liverpool and William’s son, Richard Rylandes Costain, was sent to run the London company. Under him, Richard Costain & Sons expanded its housing building large estates all around London, the largest being a site for 7,500 homes in South Hornchurch, started in 1934. Perhaps the best known development of all was Dolphin Square, which was completed in 1937.

During 1933, Richard Costain (the London-based business) was floated on the London Stock Exchange; the Liverpool business was not part of the flotation. By then, Costain had completed over 4,000 houses in the London area, some at prices up to £4,000. Costain continued to expand its private housebuilding and it was described as "one of the largest speculative housebuilders and estate developers in this country before the war."

Following the flotation, Costain moved into civil engineering. One such early undertaking in this area was on the Trans-Iranian Railway and then at Abadan, Iran for BP. Losses on the railway, on Beckton sewage works and the costs of Dolphin Square caused financial problems, and Costain had to look for alternative funds when Barclays withdrew its overdraft facilities. By 1939 the company was on Heath Drive in Tadworth in Surrey, when Arthur Costain was the chairman.

Throughout the Second World War, Costain undertook extensive military work, including the construction of Royal Ordnance Factories and airfields. One particular highlight of its wartime activities was serving as one of the contractors who built the Mulberry harbour units.

Sir Richard Rylandes Costain CBE (20 November 1902 – 26 March 1966) was chairman in the 1950s, the grandson of the founder.

In the immediate post-war years, only small estate development was undertaken by the firm; it was not until the acquisition of Nottingham-based Rostance Group in 1962 that private housebuilding resumed on any scale. Further bolstered by the acquisition of the Blackpool firm R Fielding in 1969, Costain was building around 1,000 houses per year by the beginning of the 1970s. The substantially increased revenues that accrued to the oil producing states led to a construction boom in the Middle East during the 1970s. Costain was a major beneficiary, particularly in the Emirates, and within a decade profits increased from little more than £1m a year to £47m.

In the 1960s, A. P. Costain became chairman, with Sir Robert Taylor as chief executive.

During 1985, Costain was part of the TransManche Link consortium that constructed the Channel Tunnel, which was at the time the most expensive construction project ever proposed, the final cost amounted to £9 billion (equivalent to £19 billion in 2025).

During the 1980s, recognising that exceptional Middle East profits could not continue, Costain sought to redeploy its extensive cash balances into coal mining, international housing and commercial property. However, over expansion in the end of the 1980s led to high gearing just as international markets were turning down; this circumstance was exacerbated by a disastrous explosion which killed ten people in 1989 at a Costain owned coal mine in the United States, for which the firm was fined $3.75m in February 1993.

As a consequence of the early 1990s recession, the company incurred substantial losses that not only rapidly depleted its reserves but also compelled the sale of several key assets along with various cutbacks, particularly in its underperforming housebuilding division, that left Costain as a predominantly construction-oriented business. More fiscal strain came in the form of a combined charge of £160m that was incurred by a pair of rights issues that arose in 1991 and 1993. Nevertheless, some sectors, such as coal mining, continued to provide reliable work for Costain at this time.

During a dramatic low point in April 1995, the demise of Costain was incorrectly predicted by numerous British broadsheets. It was claimed that the company could not be expected to survive as an operating company by the end of the century. In 1995, Alan Lovell was appointed chief executive of Costain; the actions taken during his two year tenure, which included the sale of the company's property interests in London and the acceptance of a £73m refinancing arrangement that gave the Malaysian building group Intria a 40 percent stake in the business, have been credited with having saved Costain. On two occasions in 1996, the company had its shares suspended.

During 1999, Brewer Gold Mine, an American subsidiary of Costain, abandoned a gold mine in South Carolina, which had been closed, and ceased performing its remediation duties.

=== 21st century ===
In the early years of the 21st century, Costain worked on the Channel Tunnel Rail Link, which included the modernisation of London St Pancras station to accept Eurostar trains, and on the Thameslink, and Crossrail projects in central London; on Crossrail, Costain's contracts included the Paddington and Bond Street stations (both with Skanska), and the north east network upgrade. In 2010, Costain was named Contractor of the Decade by New Civil Engineer.

While led by Andrew Wyllie, the company's CEO from September 2005 to May 2019, Costain invested in technology and consultancy staff, which in March 2018 comprised a third (1,300) of the company's then 4,000 employees. Alex Vaughan succeeded Wyllie as CEO.

During June 2019, a gloomy trading update following several delayed and cancelled projects contributed to Costain's share value declining over 35%. In December 2019, a court ruling increasing Costain's liabilities on a Welsh road project caused the firm to cut its full year profit forecasts; its share price fell 19% in early trading.

On 11 March 2020, Costain announced a £100m rights issue, aiming to strengthen its balance sheet after it suffered a £6.6m pre tax loss on revenues of £1.16 billion in 2019; the news sent Costain shares down 34%, with the plunge continuing the following day, dropping below £1 to 88p. The company was also affected by the COVID-19 pandemic shutdown with major projects (amounting to a third of operating revenue) suspended. As a result, the board and senior leadership team agreed a 30% reduction in salaries and fees for up to three months, while also making other short term economies. Two months later, Dubai-based contractor ASGC Construction stated that it planned to invest £25m in Costain's £100m rights issue, giving it a 15% stake in the group. The rights issue was concluded in late May 2020, with ASGC becoming Costain's biggest shareholder. In September 2024, ASGC sold its shareholding in Costain to institutional investors for £38m.

In March 2023, Costain announced - after three consecutive years of pre-tax losses - that its results for 2022 showed a pre-tax profit of £34.2m on revenue up 25% at £1,421m (2021: £1,135m).

In October 2025, Costain announced it had been awarded a contract, worth up to £1 billion, with Sellafield Ltd to refurbish and replace utility distribution systems and services as part of a decommissioning programme.

== Structure ==
Costain's activities are organised into two operating divisions: Natural Resources (water, energy and defence and nuclear energy) and Transportation (road, rail and integrated transport).

== Major projects ==
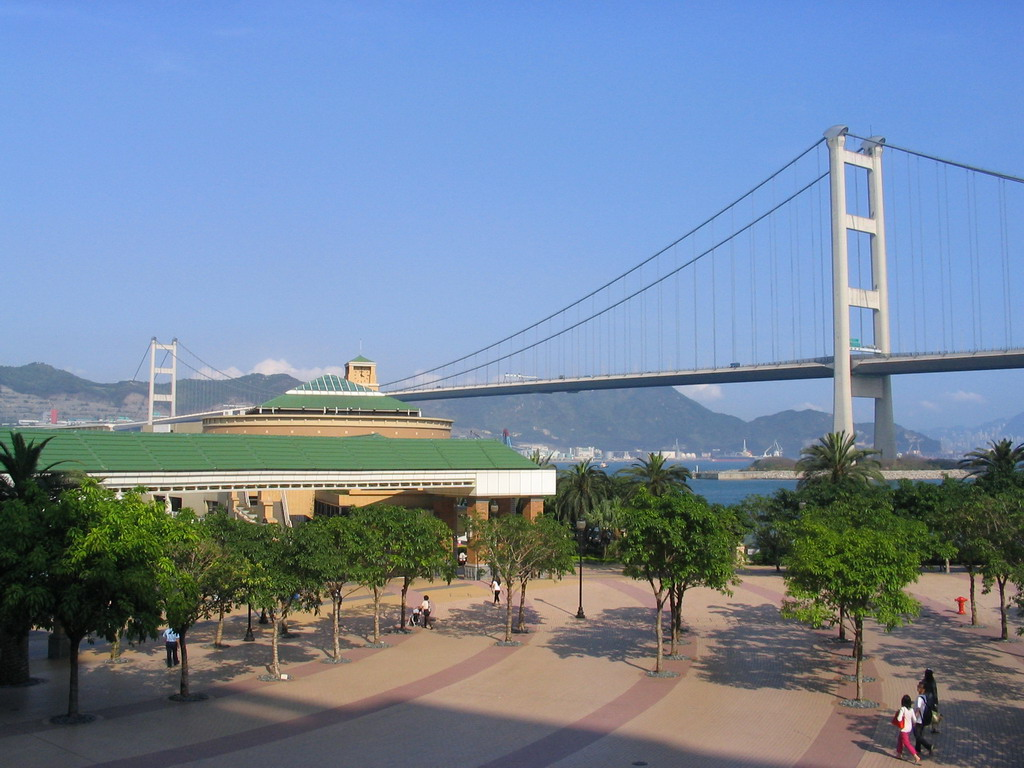
The Tsing Ma Bridge built by a joint venture involving Costain

- The Dolphin Square apartments in London, completed in 1937
- A section of the Trans-Iranian Railway, completed in 1939
- Usk Reservoir, completed in 1955
- Hydro electric power station on the River Garry, Inverness-shire, completed in 1955
- West London Air Terminal, completed in 1957
- RAF Gan, in the Maldive Islands, completed in 1957
- Mining, Thermodynamics and Nuclear Power Laboratory, University of Nottingham, completed in 1958
- Analytical & Physics Laboratory at BP Sunbury Research Centre, completed in 1958
- Extension of runway at Glasgow Prestwick Airport, completed in 1960
- Dubai International Airport, completed in 1960
- The Deep Water Harbour at Bridgetown, Barbados, completed in 1961
- Physics and Mathematics building, University of Nottingham, completed in 1961
- Balderhead Reservoir, completed in 1961
- Prince Charles Cinema, completed in 1961
- Plymouth Law Courts, completed in 1963
- East Midlands Airport, completed in 1964
- Most of West Thurrock Power Station, completed in 1965
- Lotus factory, RAF Hethel, completed in 1966
- Shell Teesside Refinery, completed in 1967
- Heathrow Airport runway extended to 12,800ft, an increase of 3,500ft, completed in 1970
- Enfield Civic Centre in London, completed in 1975
- Hardened aircraft shelters for USAF at RAF Alconbury, RAF Lakenheath, RAF Woodbridge and RAF Bentwaters, but had large union disputes, completed in 1980
- The Thames Barrier, completed in 1984
- The Channel Tunnel, completed in 1994
- Tsing Ma Bridge in Hong Kong, completed in 1997
- The Cardiff Bay Barrage, completed in 1999
- Golden Jubilee wing at King's College Hospital, completed in 2002
- The King's Cross Western Ticketing Hall, completed in 2006
- Bond Street Station redevelopment, completed in 2021

Costain is also involved in HS2 lots S1 and S2, working as part of joint venture, due to complete in 2031.

== Controversies ==
=== Blacklisting ===
Costain was revealed as a subscriber to the United Kingdom's Consulting Association, exposed in 2009 for operating an illegal construction industry blacklist. Subsequently, it was also one of the eight businesses that were involved in the launch in 2013 of the Construction Workers Compensation Scheme, a move that was condemned as a "PR stunt" by the GMB union, and described by the Scottish Affairs Select Committee as "an act of bad faith".

In December 2017, trade union Unite announced it had issued High Court proceedings against twelve major contractors, including Costain.

=== Late payment ===
In April 2019, Costain was suspended from the UK Government's Prompt Payment Code, for failing to pay suppliers on time. It was reinstated in July 2019.
