= CAPRiM =

Intelligence service used by corporations

- Corporate Asset Protection and Risk Management
- Predecessor: Economic League
- Formation: 1993
- Dissolved: 2009; 17 years ago
- Type: Pressure group
- Legal status: Defunct
- Purpose: Provide intelligence for corporations against free market political groups
- Headquarters: London, United Kingdom
- Region served: United Kingdom

CAPRiM (Corporate Asset Protection and Risk Management) was an organisation in the United Kingdom that provided an intelligence service on what it felt were groups that were against the interest of corporations.

== History ==
CAPRiM was established in May 1993 as a successor to the Economic League, which had held the construction industry's blacklist until it was wound up in 1993 after a parliamentary inquiry and bad press. It provided continued employment for two former League directors, Jack Winder and Stan Hardy. The construction company Sir Robert McAlpine Ltd invested £10,000 in founding CAPRiM on the understanding that it would not interfere with The Consulting Association.

== Targets ==
In evidence given to the Scottish Parliamentary Affairs Committee, as part of its inquiry into blacklisting on 5 February 2013, the former CAPRiM director Jack Winder said that it held information and knowledge on campaigning groups and "far-left" political parties seen as a threat to businesses such as the following:

- Greenpeace
- Reclaim the Streets
- Ethical consumerism
- Campaign Against the Arms Trade
- Animal rights
- Anti-GM activists

CAPRiM warned firms of those that it believed could "weaken a company's ability to manage its affairs profitably". Its monitor said: "Companies need to be warned what these organisations are saying and planning. Caprim provides this information. And assesses the strength of the threat. And advises on appropriate action".

== Directors ==
Jack Winder claimed that the joint managing directors were himself and Stan Hardy, and its non-executive directors were Sir Henry Saxon Tate CBE (of Tate & Lyle) and Bernard Norman Sefton-Forbes. Hardy had previously been the director-general of the Economic League and was a director of CAPRiM until at least 1999.
