= Richard Costain =

- Born: Richard Costain; 1839; Isle of Man
- Died: 1 July 1902 (aged 62–63); West Derby, Liverpool, United Kingdom
- Occupation: Construction business owner

Richard Costain (1839–1902) was the founder of Costain Group, one of the United Kingdom's largest, oldest and best-known construction businesses.

== Early life ==
He was born and raised in the Isle of Man. His father was a shoe maker.

He married on 8 March 1866 at Rushen parish church, to the sixth daughter of Richard Kneen, of Cross-e-Caley in Rushen. Costain lived at Birkdale Park, in Southport.

== Career ==
Richard Costain moved to Crosby, Merseyside where, in 1865, he founded a small but well-equipped construction business. In the early days of the business, he worked in partnership with his brother-in-law William Kneen and together they expanded the business until it was operating both in Lancashire and on the Isle of Man. He worked with Richard Kneen of Southport in the 1860s, with the business at 3, Albert Road, in Waterloo, known as Costain and Kneen.

Kneen and Costain purchased tracts of land, then built many houses on them. Masons and joiners were recruited from Arbory on the Isle of Man.

== Personal life ==
Richard Costain later lived at Blundellsands, located near Crosby.

He died in West Derby in 1902, leaving the business, by then known as Richard Costain Limited, to his son William Percy Costain. He died aged 63 on 1 July 1902, at 'Port-y-Shee'. His funeral was at St Luke's Church, Great Crosby.

== Family ==
In 1866, Costain married Margaret Kneen.
