= Waterloo Air Terminal =

Former heliport in London

Coordinates: 51.5038°N 0.1160°W

The Waterloo Air Terminal was a passenger reception, check-in facility and heliport on the South Bank of the River Thames in London. It was used by British European Airways (BEA) and other European airlines between 1953 and 1957, when it was replaced by the West London Air Terminal. Passengers checked in, were issued with a boarding card, and were transported to either London (now Heathrow) Airport or Northolt Airport using a fleet of coaches.

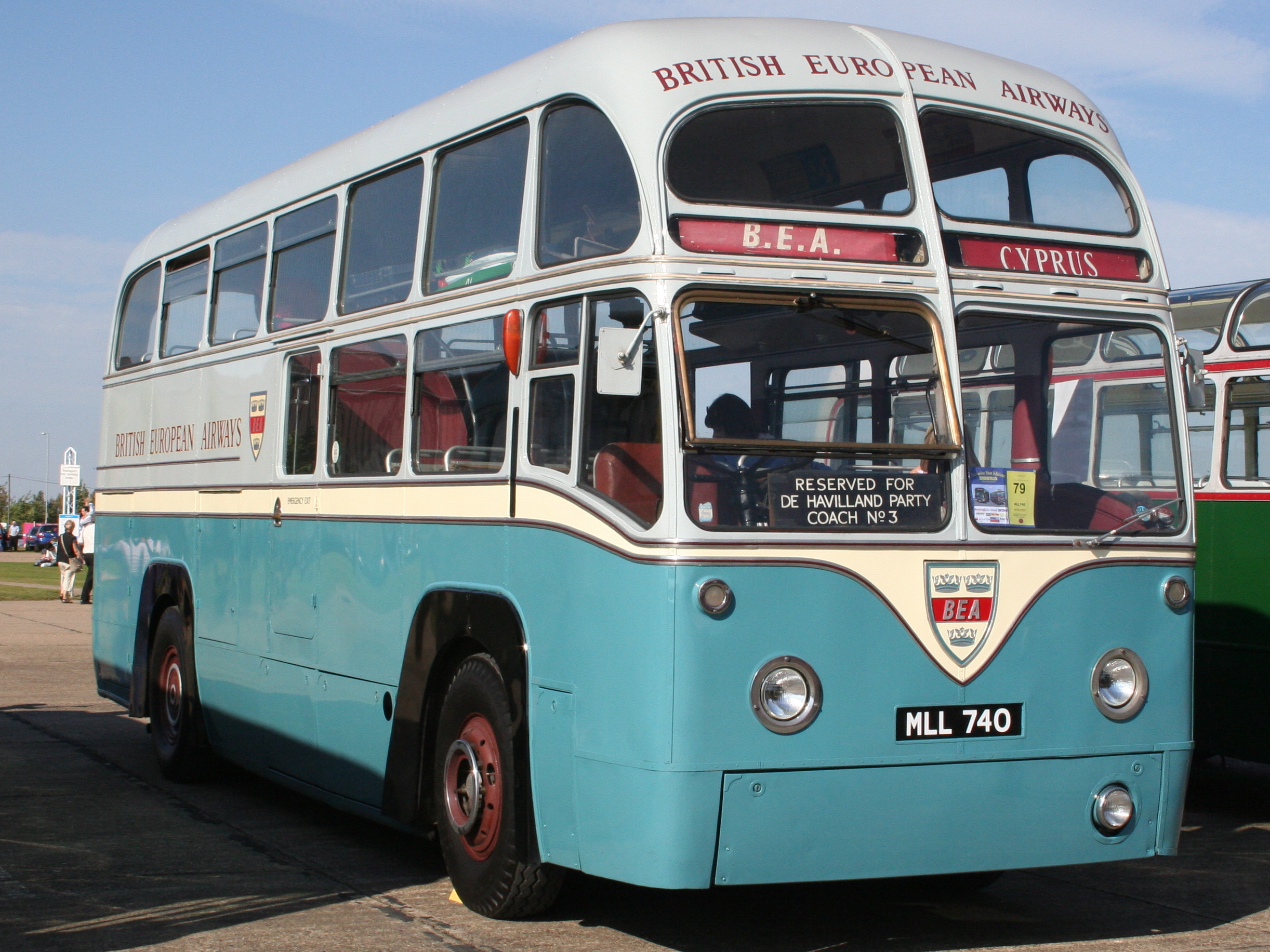
Although a limited helicopter service was available, most passengers were transported to Heathrow or Northolt by bus.

== South Bank ==
In 1952, British European Airways (BEA) announced that it was to build a new London air station to replace the existing premises at Kensington. The three-acre site had been used for the 1951 Festival of Britain and was adjacent to London Waterloo station and connected by escalator to Waterloo tube station. The terminal building was created by modifying the festival's Station Gate building. The site was owned by the London County Council, and BEA took a five-year lease on it. It was expected that the conversion of the Station Gate building and the preparation of a coach park would cost £90,000.

== Operation ==
The terminal began operation on 19 May 1953, with the first coach leaving for Heathrow; it was officially opened two days later by Alan Lennox-Boyd, the Minister of Civil Aviation. The terminal allowed passengers to check in for flights of not only BEA but other European airlines, and was designed to cope with 2,000 passengers per hour. During the first year 900,000 passengers passed through the terminal.

== Helicopter service ==
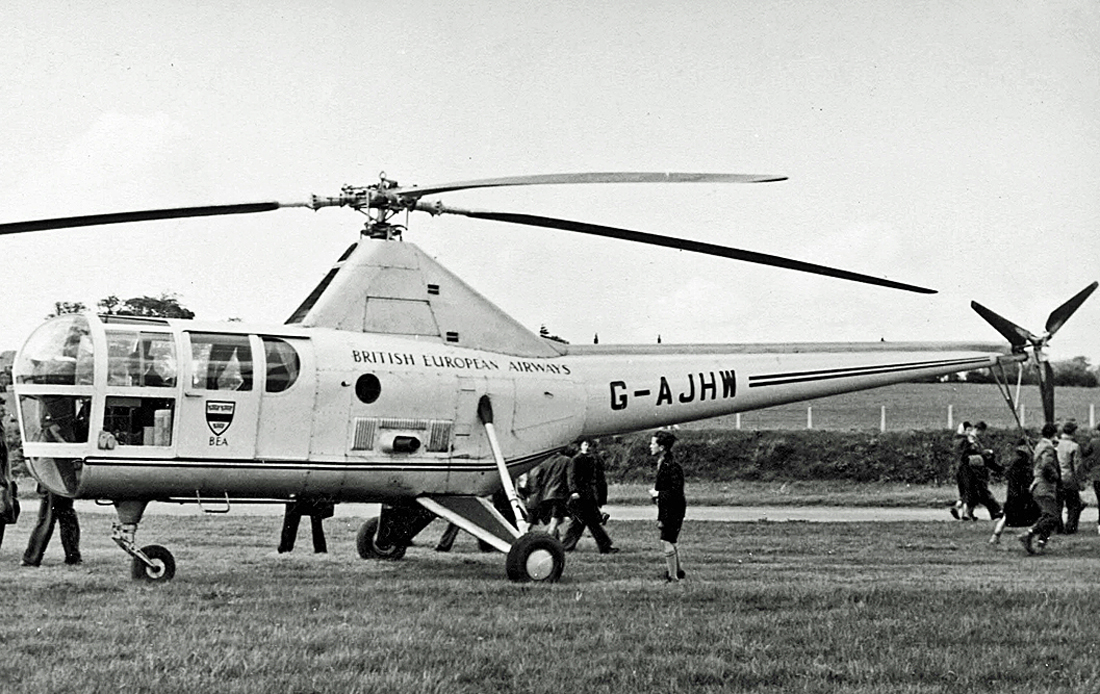
A Sikorsky S-51 of BEA Helicopters

Before the site was completed, BEA had completed trial flights in 1952 using a Sikorsky S-51 and Bristol Sycamore helicopters to prove that it could be used for helicopter operations. Because of the restriction on single-engined helicopters and the need to fly along the River Thames to reach the site, the service used the larger Westland Whirlwind which was equipped with floats. On 25 July 1955, the S-55s began a regular service from London Airport to the Terminal; the last flight was on 31 May 1956.

== Site closure ==
The London County Council had plans to re-develop the South Bank site, and BEA notified the council that it would hand back the site in 1957 when a new West London Air Terminal was built to replace it. The new terminal was opened on 6 October 1957, and the Waterloo Air Terminal was closed.
