= Costain (surname) =

Costain is a surname of English, Scottish and Manx origin. When originating in Scotland and northern Ireland the surname is an Anglicisation of the Gaelic Mac Austain, meaning "son of Austin". The English surname is a reduced form of Constant or Constantine.

== People named Costain ==
- Danny Costain, American politician
- Molly Costain Haycraft (1911-2005), Canadian, author
- Albert Costain (1910—1987), British, politician
- Richard Costain (1839–1902), British founder of the Costain construction business
- Thomas B. Costain, (1885-1965), Canadian, journalist, author
