= West London Air Terminal =

Coordinates: 51.4952°N 0.1873°W

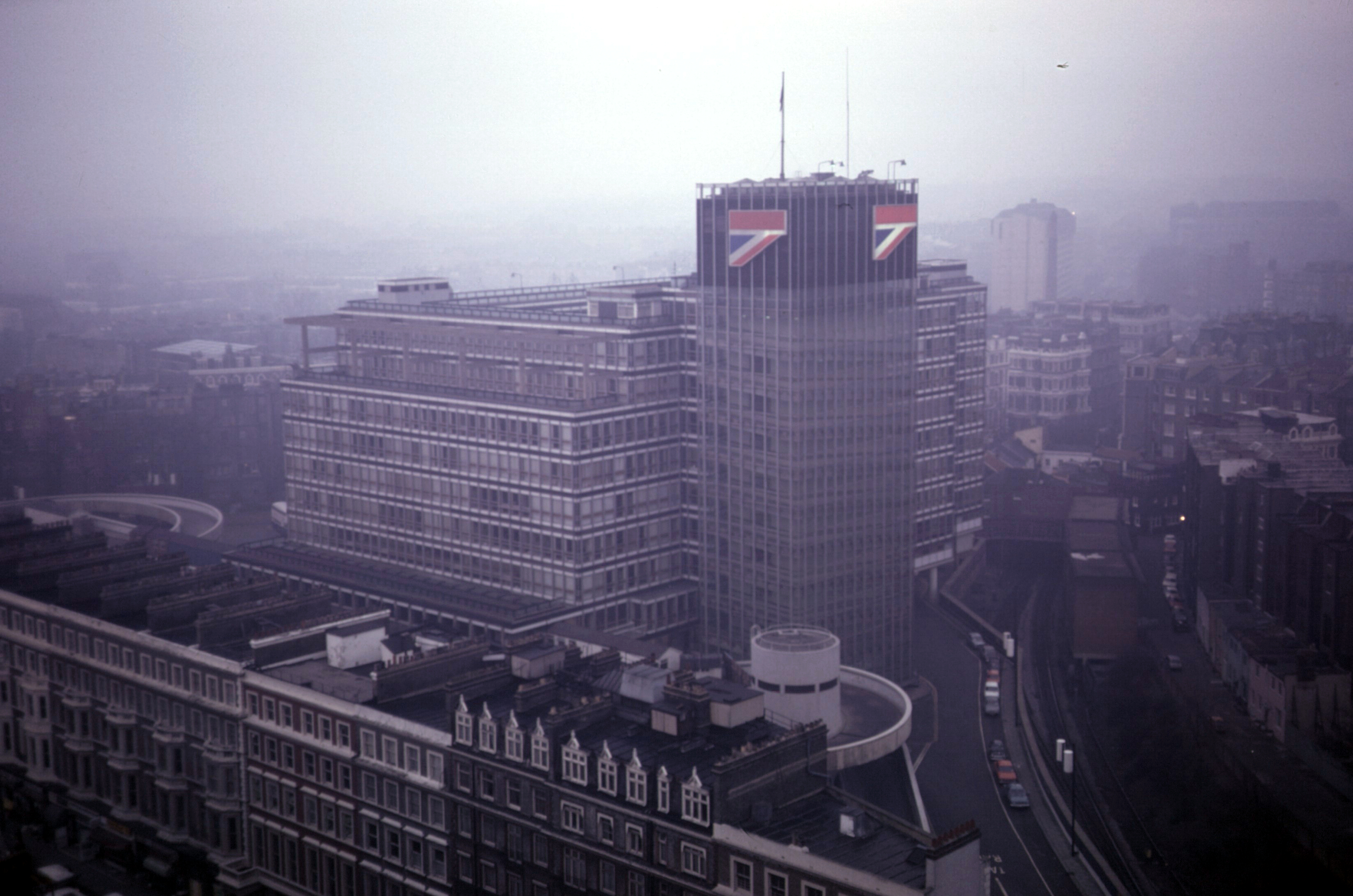
- The West London Air Terminal in February 1976

General information
- Status: Closed (since 1 January 1974)
- Type: Airport terminal
- Location: Kensington, London, UK
- Opened: 6 October 1957

The West London Air Terminal was a check-in facility for British European Airways flights from Heathrow Airport. It was located on Cromwell Road in Kensington, London, and was in operation from 6 October 1957 to 1 January 1974. After passengers checked in their baggage and received their boarding passes, they would travel to Heathrow Airport by coach. One of the drawbacks of using the terminal for checking in was that road traffic could delay the coaches and ultimately delay the departure of the flight.

== History ==
Heathrow Airport started to gradually replace Croydon Airport as London's main airport from 1946 onwards. Croydon Airport used a location near London Victoria station as its airport terminal but this location was unsuitable for Heathrow Airport, so a committee consisting of the airlines, British Railways and London Transport decided to build a new terminal in West London. In the view of the committee's report of 1954, the best site for the terminal was the Cromwell Curve, a disused section of railway line owned by London Transport, that provided easy access to Heathrow Airport by road. The terminal was designed to replace the Waterloo Air Terminal. British European Airways (BEA) wanted the terminal ready by September 1957, so a temporary building was erected by Costain Group. The terminal was built in four-and-a-half months, and opened on 6 October 1957.

In the 1960s, a permanent building was built by Holland, Hannen & Cubitts. The architect of this building was Sir John Burnet, Tait and Partners. The new £5 million air terminal was opened by Prince Philip, Duke of Edinburgh, on 6 November 1963. The six floors above the terminal's concourse were occupied by BEA's passenger-handling staff, reservations unit and accountants.

On 26 February 1962, BEA introduced their electronic reservations unit at the terminal. On 17 April 1965, BEA's automatic seat reservation system came into operation. In November 1969, BEA's computerised check-in system came into use.

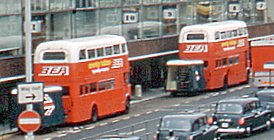
Routemasters with orange and white livery towing luggage trailers outside Heathrow Terminal 2, August 1972

On 11 May 1972, BEA announced the closure of the check-in facilities at the terminal. The check-in facilities closed on 1 January 1974. However, bus services running between the terminal and Heathrow Airport operated until March 1979.

The Sainsbury's superstore in the western half of the former West London Air Terminal building, photographed in 2022

In 1983, a Sainsbury's superstore opened in the western half of the building. The building was bought by Regalian and three Singapore-based partners in August 1997, and converted to Point West apartments above the Sainsbury's store.

== Incidents ==
- On 7 December 1963, a fire affected the fifth, sixth and seventh floors of the terminal.
- On 28 September 1973, eight people were injured when a bomb exploded in the terminal. This was blamed on the same Provisional IRA campaign as the bombings of King's Cross and Euston stations earlier that month.
