= Morgan Est =

British based construction company

Morgan Est plc
- Company type: Private
- Industry: Construction, Civil engineering
- Founded: 1985
- Headquarters: Rugby, Warwickshire, UK
- Parent: Morgan Sindall Group
- Website: www.morganest.com

Morgan Est plc was a British-based construction company specialising in infrastructure services headquartered in Rugby, Warwickshire, England. It merged with the sister company Morgan Ashurst to form combined infrastructure and construction company Morgan Sindall, which is itself part of the Morgan Sindall Group.

== History ==
Morgan Est's roots can be traced back to the acquisition of the Miller group, and was born out of the acquisitions of Miller Civil Engineering Services Ltd by Morgan Sindall plc in 2001. In 2002, Morgan Est also entered the utility sector with the acquisition of Pipeline Constructors Ltd and in 2006 entered the rail sector with the acquisition of Gleeson MCL. In July 2007, the company bought the civil engineering part of Amec DPS, followed by Elec Track Installations (ETI) in January 2008.

In April 2010, Morgan Sindall announced that it would merge Morgan Est with Morgan Ashurst and that the merged business would trade under the Morgan Sindall name.

== Operations ==
The Company carried out the following activities:

- Infrastructure Services
- Capital Projects
- Tunnelling Services
- Utility Services
