= Industrial Development Board for Northern Ireland =

- Key people: Mr. Bruce Robinson (CEO)

The Industrial Development Board for Northern Ireland was a government agency within the Northern Ireland Department of Enterprise, Trade and Investment. It was merged with the Local Enterprise Development Unit (LEDU), the Industrial Research and Technology Unit (IRTU) and the Training and Employment Agency (T&EA) by the Industrial Development Act (Northern Ireland) 2002 to form Invest Northern Ireland in 2002.
