= Employment Relations Act 1999 (Blacklists) Regulations 2010 =

United Kingdom statutory instrument

Employment Relations Act 1999 (Blacklists) Regulations 2010 (Note: Section 1(a).)
- Statutory Instrument
- Parliament of the United Kingdom
- Citation: SI 2010/493
- Territorial extent: England and Wales; Scotland; (Note: Section 1(c).)

Dates
- Made: 1 March 2010
- Commencement: 2 March 2010 (Note: Section 1(b).)

Other legislation
- Amends: Employment Tribunals Act 1996
- Made under: Employment Relations Act 1999

Status: Current legislation

Text of statute as originally enacted

The Employment Relations Act 1999 (Blacklists) Regulations 2010 (SI 2010/493) is a UK labour law regulation which penalises a practice of listing trade union members for the purpose of discrimination against them, and potentially leads to criminal sanctions for employers and agencies who do so.

== Background ==
In 2009, the Information Commission's Office found that a group called the "Consulting Association" had compiled lists of trade unionists to exclude people from employment in the building industry. John McDonnell described this as "one of the worst ever cases of organised abuses of human rights in the UK". It resulted in the 2010 Regulations specifying the wrong and penalties.

== See also ==
- UK labour law
- Consulting Association
