= Revolutionary Democratic Group =

- Founded: 1980s
- Split from: Socialist Workers Party
- Headquarters: London
- Ideology: Socialism; Republicanism
- Political position: Far-left

The Revolutionary Democratic Group (RDG) was a socialist organisation in the United Kingdom. It was founded in the early 1980s in a split from London and Scottish branches of the Socialist Workers Party, of which, for many years, it considered itself an "external faction".

The ideological centre of the RDG was a commitment to republicanism. The RDG believed that the far-left concentrates excessively on economic struggles without a clear focus on the need for democracy. The organisation developed the concept of the social monarchy to explain the nature of the British state, and sought to demonstrate links between the existence of the monarchy and the continuation of capitalism.

The RDG consistently sought alliances with other socialist groups with the aim of forming a larger democratic socialist party. For example, it began working with the Socialist Federation in 1984. For the 1987 general election the RDG joined the Red Front, an electoral alliance spearheaded by the Revolutionary Communist Party. In 1988 the RDG sought fusion talks with Red Action. In the late 1990s it joined Arthur Scargill's Socialist Labour Party, officially dissolving and becoming the Republican Group. It left, however, regained the RDG name and soon afterwards joined the Socialist Alliance. The RDG had patchy relations with the Communist Party of Great Britain (PCC) and occasionally had articles in that group's paper, the Weekly Worker. The RDG was also active within the United Socialist Party, a political initiative started by former Liverpool dockers to build a new workers' party. The RDG briefly sold the Alliance for Workers' Liberty's newspaper Solidarity and occasionally produced one-off editions of its own paper, Republican Worker, targeted at particular events such as conferences or demonstrations.

With no website, publication or official activity, the RDG appears to be moribund. Its former leader Steve Freeman has since been involved with the Republican Communist Network, Left Unity and the Republican Socialist Alliance. Freeman stood for Parliament in Bermondsey and Old Southwark in 2010 as an independent and in 2015 as the candidate of the Republican Socialist Party.
