= Antidote Films (Australia) =

Australian film distributor

Antidote Films Australia
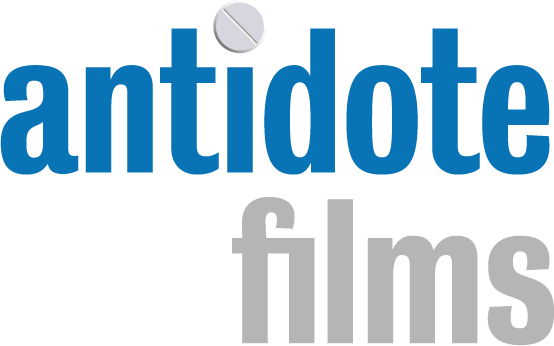
- Type: Private
- Industry: Motion pictures, Documentary
- Founded: Brisbane, Australia (2010)
- Headquarters: Brisbane, Australia
- Key people: Gil Scrine
- Website: antidotefilms.com.au

Antidote Films is a Brisbane-based independent film distributor, formerly known as Gil Scrine Films, specialising in arthouse films and social documentaries. Established in 1973 as a vehicle for distributing the documentaries of Gil Scrine, today the company is the Australian distributor for films from all over the world.

== History ==
Faced with limited distribution options for his political documentary The Bad Society (1973) profiling the late Jim Cairns, producer Gil Scrine decided to distribute the film himself. He created Gil Scrine Films as the commercial entity to represent the film. The company continued to serve as theatrical representation for Scrine’s documentaries over the next decade; Home On The Range (1982), Buried Alive: The Story of East Timor (1989), Strangers In Paradise (1989), and A Thousand Miles From Care (1991).

In 1992 the Canadian producers of Manufacturing Consent: Noam Chomsky and the Media – an independent documentary in which noted sociologist and political dissident Noam Chomsky highlighted the deployment of propaganda by the corporations and the government of America – approached Gil Scrine Films for permission to use footage from Buried Alive. Being a small budget documentary the filmmakers were unable to pay royalties for the footage, instead striking a deal granting Gil Scrine Films exclusive Australian distribution rights for Manufacturing Consent.

The film was a success both at the box office and on home video and marked a turning point for Gil Scrine Films. The company shifted focus to acquiring the rights to local and overseas productions that had been overlooked by the mainstream distributors. No longer serving only to distribute Scrine’s own locally made documentaries, the company became a successful distribution company in the Australian market.

Since then the company has adapted to changing technologies and an unpredictable market, including the 2005 closure of two independent cinemas in Sydney that threatened the niche film market. Institutions of alternative and arthouse cinema, The Valhalla in Glebe remains empty while The Chauvel cinema in Paddington was given a lifeline and has managed to stay afloat. While the struggles of the exhibitors “changed the landscape dramatically”, Gil Scrine Films has managed to remain a relevant player in the Australian film industry.

While particularly focused on social action and politically motivated documentaries such as McLibel (1998), The Corporation (2003), and A Crude Awakening (2006), the company also represents provocative fiction titles including Dinner Rush (2000), Head On (2004), and Sophie Scholl: Final Days (2005). The directive of the company remains to allow audiences access to films that are “too small or difficult or simply lost in the mad rush for the ‘new’.”

In 2010 Gil Scrine Films formally became known as Antidote Films, ending out the year as a recipient of Screen Australia’s Innovative Distribution program with their proposal for VOD platform for education and library called Beamafilm.

== Film distribution ==
Antidote Films distributes a range of documentaries and feature films including:

- A Crude Awakening: The Oil Crash
- A Good Man
- A Hero's Journey
- Art & Copy
- Bhutto
- The Boy who Plays on the Buddhas of Bamiyan
- Budrus
- Careless Love
- Coniston
- Erasing David
- Divided We Fall
- Drowned Out
- Four of a Kind
- Genius Within: The Inner Life of Glenn Gould
- Girl Clock
- Guerrilla: The Taking of Patty Hearst
- Guilty Pleasures
- Head-On
- Hope
- The House Keeper
- In Search of Beethoven
- In Search of Mozart
- Last Days Here
- Last Train Home
- Life and Debt
- Life In Movement
- Love at The Twilight Motel
- Make Hummus Not War
- Manufacturing Consent: Noam Chomsky and the Media
- McLibel
- Morris: A Life with Bells On
- Music of the Brain
- Pandora's Promise
- Position Among the Stars
- Prosecutor
- The Real Dirt on Farmer John
- RiP!: A Remix Manifesto
- Scared Sacred
- Son of a Lion
- Sophie Scholl – The Final Days
- Strange Birds in Paradise
- Tabloid
- The Burning Season
- The Choir
- The Corporation
- The Cove
- The Light
- The Miracle of Bern
- The Matilda Candidate
- The Most Dangerous Man in America
- The Snowman (1982 film)
- The Take
- The Triangle Wars
- The Weather Underground
- The Whale
- The Widower
- The Wild Parrots of Telegraph Hill
- Then The Wind Changed
- This Ain't No Mouse Music
- This Way of Life
- Unmade In China
- Up the Yangtze
- Waco: The Rules of Engagement
- Wagner & Me
- We Feed the World
- Whatever Happened to Brenda Hean
- Yes Madam, Sir
