= Indie Screenings =

Online film distribution system (2009-)

Indie Screenings, invented by Spanner Films and coded by Torchbox, is an online film distribution system which ‘cuts out the middle man’. The system gives anyone, anywhere access to licenses to screen certain independent films and keep any revenue for themselves. It launched with Franny Armstrong's climate change blockbuster The Age of Stupid which has now been screened 1474 times.

The Guardian described Indie Screenings as taking social justice films into the fast lane. Channel 4 called Indie Screenings technology “the future of film distribution”. The Pixel Report said that Indie Screenings has the potential to change significantly the way people access films.

== Launch ==
Indie Screenings launched at London's Royal Society for the Arts in May 2009 with a screening of The Age of Stupid which was simultaneously screened at 71 other venues around the UK. The film was followed by a panel discussion between Franny Armstrong, environmentalist George Monbiot and economist Lord Nicholas Stern, with Dr Mohamed Waheed Hassan, Vice President of the Maldives, vlogging in.

== History ==
Spanner Films partnered with the Channel 4 BRITDOC Foundation, a UK based non-profit dedicated to promoting independent filmmaking, to launch ‘Indie Screenings’ technology for use by other filmmakers. Good Screenings launched in March 2010 with 7 films available for individuals or groups to license - such as The End of the Line and Erasing David. Each film is picked by the Channel 4 BRITDOC Foundation team for its potential to engender positive social change.

The license fees set by Good Screenings are calculated on an individual basis according to a number of metrics - such as who you are, where you want to screen, which country you're in and how many people will watch. The lowest fee is £1 (for a school screening in e.g. Sierra Leone) and the highest £12,000 (for a multinational corporation screening to 1,000 or more people in e.g. the United States). Good Screenings charge a one-off licensing fee and make no claims on any profits made from screenings.

Channel 4 said of Good Screenings,“that's the beauty of the system - you screen the film, raise awareness of the key issues, help the film-makers earn a living to go on to make their next film for good, and then you get the cash you make on the night.”

Speaking in The Guardian Beadie Finzi, director of Channel 4 BRITDOC Foundation, says Indie Screenings could prove a catalyst as more social action film-makers join up and enjoy a wider audience for their films.

Indiescreenings is now only licensing films by Spanner Films.
