= The Age of Stupid =

2009 British documentary film

- Theatrical release poster
- Directed by: Franny Armstrong
- Written by: Franny Armstrong
- Produced by: Lizzie Gillett
- Starring: Pete Postlethwaite; Jehangir Wadia; Layefa Malin; Al Duvernay; Fernand Pareau; Jamila and Adnan Bayyoud; Piers Guy; Mark Lynas; Mohamed Nasheed; David King; George Monbiot; Richard Heinberg; Ed Miliband
- Narrated by: Pete Postlethwaite
- Cinematography: Franny Armstrong
- Edited by: David G Hill
- Music by: Chris Brierley
- Production company: Spanner Films
- Distributed by: Dogwoof Pictures (UK)
- Release date: 20 March 2009 (United Kingdom)
- Running time: 89 minutes
- Country: United Kingdom
- Language: English
- Budget: £450,000

The Age of Stupid is a 2009 British docufiction film directed by Franny Armstrong, with first-time producer Lizzie Gillett. The executive producer is John Battsek. The film is a drama-documentary-animation hybrid. It combines documentary footage from 2008 with Pete Postlethwaite portraying a man living alone in a devastated world of 2055, who asks "Why didn't we stop climate change when we had the chance?"

The makers of The Age of Stupid were among the first to use the crowdfunding model and pioneered a new distribution system, Indie Screenings. It premiered simultaneously on 62 screens across the UK in March 2009, making it a record holder for the largest ever film premiere. Critical reception was generally positive, with reviews commending its message and format.

== Plot ==
In 2055, the world has been ravaged by catastrophic climate change; London is flooded, Sydney is burning, Las Vegas has been swallowed up by desert, the Amazon rainforest has burnt up, snow has vanished from the Alps, and nuclear war has laid waste to India. An unnamed archivist (Pete Postlethwaite) is entrusted with the safekeeping of humanity's surviving store of art and knowledge. Alone in his vast repository off the coast of the largely ice-free Arctic, he reviews archival footage from back "when we could have saved ourselves", trying to discern where it all went wrong.

Amid news reports of the gathering effects of climate change and global civilisation teetering towards destruction, he alights on six stories of individuals whose lives in the early years of the 21st century seem to illustrate aspects of the impending catastrophe. They include Indian entrepreneur Jeh Wadia establishing low-cost airline GoAir, the oldest hiking guide in Chamonix discussing glacial retreat, a doctor in Nigeria whose community has been impacted by the petroleum industry, a Shell employee whose home was destroyed in Hurricane Katrina, a family of refugees fleeing the Iraq War and a British wind power developer facing backlash to potential projects.

These six stories take the form of interweaving documentary segments that report on the lives of real people around the year 2008 and switch the film's narrative form from fiction to fact. In addition to the framing narrative in 2055, the news clips and the documentary footage of the six personal stories, the film includes animated segments and brief interviews with Mark Lynas and George Monbiot, created for the film.

At the end, the archivist wonders why humans would destroy their own environment after all the progress they made. He then transmits the contents of the archive, to serve as a cautionary tale to any life forms beyond Earth.

== Production ==
=== Filming ===
Shot in seven countries over a period of three years, the film features six documentary stories, archive footage, and much animation from, amongst others, Passion Pictures, creators of the Gorillaz animations. The original rough cut did not include the archivist, which was added later to frame the story and better tie together the six parts.

=== Development ===
Franny Armstrong adopted a new model to fund the production of The Age of Stupid: crowdfunding. The approach, now popular with independent filmmakers, involves the pooling of money and other resources to support efforts initiated by other people or organisations. Thusly, The Age of Stupid's £450,000 budget was raised by selling "shares" to 223 individuals and groups who each donated between £500 and £35,000. These groups range from a hockey team to a health centre. Crowdfunding the film was done mostly to give it the best chance of reaching a mainstream multiplex audience, as well as to retain complete editorial control. These investors all own a percentage of the film and have received a pro-rata share in the profits, alongside the 105 crew members who worked for survival wages.

In the Huffington Post, Jon Reiss described Armstrong’s approach as trailblazing: "the future of film, film culture and film distribution and marketing". He mentions that most of the budget, £857,000, was gathered "through direct contributions from their fans."

A 55-minute documentary, The Making of The Age of Stupid, shows how the film was made, the film itself was 1 hour 29 mins long

The producers calculated the carbon footprint of the film's production to be around 95 tonnes of CO_{2}, and its promotion around 57 tonnes.

=== Music ===
The soundtrack includes songs from Radiohead, Depeche Mode, Dragnerve and The Band of Holy Joy, as well as an original orchestral score written by Chris Brierley.

== Release ==
Promotional image for the film showing Pete Postlethwaite at his archival computer.

The film's UK premiere was on 15 March 2009, in London's Leicester Square. The screening was held in a solar-powered 'cinema tent' and conducted without use of mains electricity. An independent audit conducted by Carbon Accounting Systems found the event's carbon emissions to be 1% of those produced by a normal blockbuster premiere. Linked by satellite to 62 cinemas around the UK, the premiere received a Guinness World Record for being the largest film premiere ever, based on number of screens.

During the post show discussion, which was broadcast live across the internet and at screenings, President Mohamed Nasheed received a standing ovation for announcing that the Maldives would be the world's first carbon neutral country. The film's star, Pete Postlethwaite, threatened to return his OBE if the UK government gave the go-ahead to the controversial Kingsnorth coal-fired power station in Kent. A month later the government announced a change to its policy on coal – no new coal-fired power station will get government consent unless it can capture and bury 25% of the emissions it produces immediately – and 100% of emissions by 2025. This, a source told The Guardian, represented "a complete rewrite of UK energy policy".

The UK premiere received the accolades of 'Best Green Event' from Event Awards and best Live Brand Experience in the PR Week Awards.

In the UK, The Age of Stupid was released in 62 cinemas in its opening week and hit the top of the box office charts (by screen average). The total run was 13 consecutive weeks, playing in 263 cinemas in all, with the longest single run being four weeks at London's Odeon Panton Street.

The Age of Stupid was launched in Australia and New Zealand on 19 August 2009, with simultaneous green carpet premieres in Auckland and Sydney, linked by satellite to 32 cinemas in Australia and 13 in New Zealand. The film was then released in all 13 cinemas in New Zealand and a number of the 32 in Australia.

The film was released internationally on 21 September and 22 September 2009, at the "Global Premiere". A green carpet cinema tent in downtown New York, powered by locally sourced biodiesel, was linked by satellite to 442 cinemas across the USA and to more than 200 cinemas in more than 30 other countries, as well as another 33 countries which hosted independent screenings with no satellite link. Popular musicians Moby and Thom Yorke from Radiohead performed live. Special guests at the New York premier included Kofi Annan, Ed Miliband, Mohamed Nasheed, Rajendra Pachauri, Heather Graham, and Gillian Anderson. Pranksters, The Yes Men, walked up the green carpet in their "survivaballs". A number of guests arrived by low-carbon transport, including sailboat, rowing boat, electric car, bicycle, cycle rickshaw, and rollerblades.

In Germany, the film was premiered in Berlin and Hamburg on 1 June 2010, followed by a limited cinema release in 12 cities: Berlin, Bonn, Bremen, Frankfurt, Freiberg, Göttingen, Gütersloh, Hamburg, Hanover, München, Köln, Nürnberg, and Potsdam.

The film had limited theatrical releases via distributors Mongrel Media in Canada and via Arts Alliance in Argentina, Austria, Belgium, Brazil, Bulgaria, Chile, China, Costa Rica, Croatia, Cyprus, Czech Republic, Denmark, Finland, France, Greece, Honduras, Hong Kong, Hungary, Iceland, India, Indonesia, Iran, Israel, Italy, Japan, Jordan, Kazakhstan, Kenya, Kiribati, Kosovo, Kyrgyzstan, Lebanon, Luxembourg, Madagascar, Malaysia, Maldives, Malta, Mauritius, Mexico, Micronesia, Moldova, Mozambique, Nepal, Netherlands, Nigeria, Norway, Palestinian Territories, Papua New Guinea, Peru, Philippines, Poland, Portugal, Romania, Russia, Serbia, Sierra Leone, Singapore, Slovakia, Slovenia, South Africa, Spain, Swaziland, Sweden, Switzerland, Taiwan, Tanzania, Thailand, Turkey, Vanuatu, Venezuela, Vietnam and Zimbabwe.

The film continues to be shown in local venues worldwide through Indie Screenings – a web-based form of film distribution, pioneered by Age of Stupid's director Franny Armstrong, which allows anyone to buy a licence to hold a screening of the film and keep the profits for themselves.

=== Distribution ===
On 22 May 2009, The Age of Stupid team launched their Indie Screenings model, a new form of film distribution which allows anyone, anywhere to buy a licence to hold a screening of the film - with the price set according to the screener's means - and then, crucially, to charge for tickets and keep any profits for themselves. The launch on 22 May was held at The RSA, following which there was a webcast panel discussion with director Franny Armstrong, journalist George Monbiot, economist Nicholas Stern, and Met Office head of climate impacts Richard Betts. The panel discussion, organised by Indie Screenings, was screened at 71 locations.

The Indie Screenings model immediately proved extremely popular, with 682 screenings booked in the first four months, generating more than £55,000. After the cost of writing the software was paid off, 100% of the proceeds went to pay back the crowdfunding investors. There were no wholesalers or resellers.

== Reception ==
=== Critical response ===
Writing for The Guardian, environmental activist George Monbiot, who appears in the film, said its "message, never stated but constantly emerging, is that we all have our self-justifying myths. We tell ourselves a story of our lives in which we almost always appear as the heroes. These myths prevent us from engaging with climate change." The Financial Times critic described the film as intelligent and provoking, giving "The wisdom of hindsight, today". Time Out London's film editor, Dave Calhoun, said, "Armstrong's prognosis is apocalyptic, but her journalism is solid, instructive and pleasingly thoughtful," and described the film as "entertaining and provocative". The Times called the film "the most imaginative and dramatic assault on the institutional complacency shrouding the issue", saying, "The power of this shameless campaigning film is that it gives dates and deadlines. It explores options and ideas. It names culprits..." The Telegraph's reviewer, Sukhdev Sandhu, said, "Bold, supremely provocative, and hugely important, [Armstrong's] film is a cry from the heart as much as a roar for necessary change."

On the review aggregator website Rotten Tomatoes, 73% of 15 critics' reviews are positive. The New York Times described the film as a "much sterner and more alarming polemic than An Inconvenient Truth". The review noted the "gallows humor" throughout the film, although the review was critical of the crude animated sequences. The Sydney Morning Herald described the film as "a wake-up call with an elegiac tone – not quite hectoring but pressing. This is about human nature, greed and personal responsibility. It aims to scare and galvanize – and it's pretty good at both."

William Nicholson, writer of Shadowlands (1985) and Gladiator (2000), said: "I hate this film. I felt as if I was watching all my own excuses for not doing anything about climate change being stripped away from me".

Phelim McAleer attended the New York City premiere of the movie; when McAleer asked the movie director how she got to the premiere in New York, security kicked him out of the event. Later, McAleer told The Irish News that the film should have been called the "Age of Hypocrisy".

Scott Thill wrote in HuffPost that the film inspired him to popularise the term "cli-fi".

=== Awards ===
- Grierson:Sheffields Awards - Best Green Doc 2008
- Sunny Side of the Doc - Best Green Doc 2008
- Sunny Side of the Doc - Film Most Likely To Be Cinema Hit 2008
- Sunchild International Environmental Festival - First Prize
- Birds Eye View Film Festival - Best Documentary 2009
- British Independent Film Awards – Best Documentary 2009 (nominated)

== Subsequent media ==
=== The Stupid Show ===
To help demystify the geo-political intricacies surrounding climate change, The Age of Stupid team staged a guerrilla production from the Copenhagen United Nations Climate Change Conference (7 to 18 December 2009), called The Stupid Show. Franny Armstrong hosted the run of eight 40-60-minute shows which were broadcast live on the web daily from Friday 11 December until the final day of the conference, Saturday 19 December. Armstrong has described The Stupid Show as 'a budget version of The Daily Show with Jon Stewart but much sillier and more interactive'.

The Stupid Show aimed to make the Copenhagen talks comprehensible to ordinary people using a mix of humour, stunts, video clips, graphic illustrations and interviews with delegates, climate change experts and activists billeted in the Danish capital Copenhagen for the summit. Highlights from the run included punditry from Radiohead singer Thom Yorke, an interview with author Naomi Klein, an interview with Ed Miliband conducted by Franny Armstrong whilst standing on her head, and a live link-up to an underwater camera in Belize which showed how climate change is devastating coral reefs. The production team consisted of nine people, all of whom worked with Armstrong on The Age of Stupid. Key members of The Stupid Show crew include producer Lizzie Gillett, writer Mark Lynas and editor Justin Badger.

=== 10:10 ===
An offshoot of The Age of Stupid project is 10:10, a UK-wide campaign encouraging everyone in the United Kingdom to reduce their carbon emissions by at least 10% in 12 months. Franny Armstrong conceived the 10:10 campaign to complement the ongoing promotion of her film: while The Age of Stupid is primarily aimed at raising awareness of climate change as a pending global humanitarian crisis, 10:10 is presented as a strategy for people to take positive action in the face of such an urgent and daunting problem.

=== 10 year anniversary ===
In 2019 to mark the ten-year anniversary of the film, The Guardian released a video revisiting Armstrong and other individuals featured in the film. Armstrong speaks to Mark Lynas about the 2 degree climate target and George Monbiot at a school strike for climate, and it is revealed the Cornish wind farm facing opposition in the film is eventually built.

== See also ==
- Apocalyptic and post-apocalyptic fiction
- Climate change in popular culture
- Environmental migrant
- Global catastrophic risk
- List of crowdsourcing projects
- Retreat of glaciers since 1850
- Six Degrees: Our Future on a Hotter Planet
