= Franny Armstrong =

British documentary film director

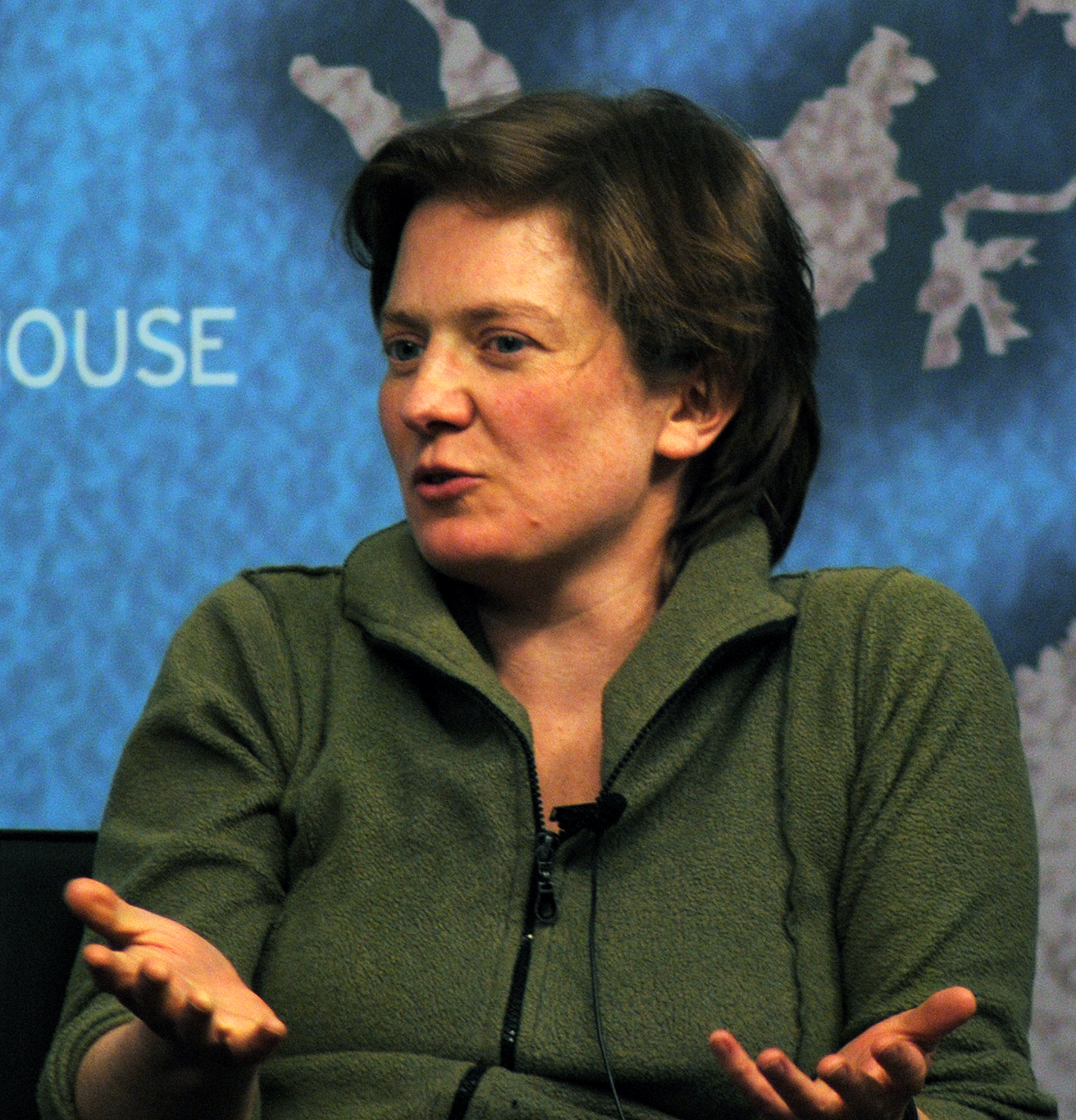
- Armstrong at Chatham House in 2013
- Born: 3 February 1972 (age 54)
- Occupations: Documentary film director Former drummer with The Band of Holy Joy
- Notable work: McLibel; The Age of Stupid; Drowned Out
- Father: Peter Armstrong

Franny Armstrong (born 3 February 1972) is a British documentary film director working for her own company, Spanner Films, and a former drummer with indie pop group The Band of Holy Joy. She is best known for three films: The Age of Stupid, a reflection from 2055 about climate change, McLibel, about the McDonald's court case and Drowned Out, following the fight against the Narmada Dam Project.

Armstrong pioneered the use of crowdfunding for independent films and developed an innovative form of film distribution known as Indie Screenings. Her most recent project is the carbon reduction campaign 10:10 which she founded in the UK in September 2009, and which is now active in more than 50 countries. On International Women's Day, 8 March 2011, she was named as one of The Guardian newspaper's "Top 100 Women", in a list which included Aung San Suu Kyi, Gareth Peirce, Doris Lessing, Arundhati Roy and Oprah Winfrey. Her father is the television producer Peter Armstrong.

== Education ==
Armstrong read zoology at University College London and her thesis was Is the human species suicidal?

== Career ==
Armstrong's first documentary, McLibel (1997, 2005), is an account of the McDonald's libel trial, the longest-running court action in English legal history. Filmed over ten years with no commission, no budget and a voluntary crew – including Ken Loach, who directed the courtroom reconstructions – it gained attention when lawyers prevented its broadcast, first at BBC One and then at Channel 4 in 1997. Eight years later - after the 'McLibel Two' had defeated the British government at the European Court of Human Rights – it was finally broadcast on BBC2 at 10.30pm on a Sunday, to an estimated 1 million viewers.

It was well received by critics, with Time Out crediting Armstrong with "gusto and wit" in telling a story that "will satisfy both head and heart". The Guardian concluded that McLibel was "absolutely unmissable".

McLibel was broadcast on television in 15 countries, and in cinemas in the US in summer 2005, and this was followed in the UK in 2006. McLibel was nominated for numerous awards, including the Grierson Documentary Award and the British Independent Film Awards. It was one of only two British films, with the other being Michael Buerk's original news report which inspired Live Aid, picked for the British Film Institute's prestigious series, "Ten Documentaries which Changed the World".

Armstrong's second feature documentary, Drowned Out (2002), follows an Indian family who chose to stay at home and drown rather than make way for the Narmada Dam. It was nominated for Best Documentary at the British Independent Film Awards 2004 and was released theatrically in America and on DVD in 2006.

Armstrong released The Age of Stupid (formerly known as Crude) in March 2009. It's a film that warns of the catastrophic effects of climate change using a mix of factual documentary and post-apocalyptic fictional styles. The film's UK premiere was on 15 March 2009, in London's Leicester Square. The screening was held in a solar-powered 'cinema tent' and conducted without use of mains electricity. An independent audit conducted by Carbon Accounting Systems found the event's carbon emissions to be 1% of those produced by a normal blockbuster premiere. Linked by satellite to 62 cinemas around the UK, the premiere received a Guinness World Record for being the largest film premiere ever, based on number of screens.

The complete five-year production of The Age of Stupid was made into a film and launched exclusively on the Guardian website.

Through her company, Spanner Films, Armstrong pioneered the "crowdfunding" finance model, which allows filmmakers to raise reasonable-size budgets whilst retaining ownership of their films. The Age of Stupid raised £900,000 from over 600 investors.

Armstrong also developed the "Indie Screenings" distribution system, which lets anyone make a profit by holding screenings of independent films. The producers maintain a running total of all the people who have seen Spanner's films, Armstrong's production company, via cinema, TV and local screenings, as of January 2011 it stands at just over 61 million.

At the UN Climate Summit in Copenhagen in December 2009, Armstrong presented a daily web TV show, The Stupid Show, which aimed to "make sense of humankind's most important get-together".

In September 2009, Armstrong founded the 10:10 climate campaign which aims to help all sectors of society to aim for a 10% cut 10% in their carbon emissions in 12 months. The campaign has amassed huge cross-societal support including household names such as Adidas, Microsoft, and Tottenham Hotspur F.C. The campaign launched globally in 2010 and is now active in over 50 countries.

In October 2010, a short film, written by Richard Curtis, entitled No Pressure was released by the 10:10 campaign in Britain to spread awareness of climate change. The video was subsequently taken down from the organization's website due to very negative reception and offence taken. However, it is still available in several places, including YouTube. It depicted a series of scenes in which people were asked if they were going to participate in 10:10. Those who indicated they weren't planning on participating were told "no pressure" and then blown up in a gory explosion at the press of a red button. In response to questions about the message of the film, Armstrong replied, "We 'killed' five people to make No Pressure – a mere blip compared to the 300,000 real people who now die each year from climate change".

In March 2014, Armstrong announced her new project Undercovers, a television drama series about the undercover police officers who infiltrated the British activist scene for 50 years, and the women who unknowingly had longterm relationships and even children with the spies. The series is being written by Simon Beaufoy (Slumdog Millionaire, Hunger Games, Full Monty), Alice Nutter, and Franny Armstrong, produced by Spanner Films and executive produced by Tony Garnett. Filming is due to start in Autumn 2014, with an early 2015 release.

Armstrong is Professor of Film at the University of Wolverhampton.

Pie Net Zero, a comedic short film about climate change and biosequestration efforts in South West England written by Armstrong and comedian Tom Walker and featuring Armstrong as herself and Walker's character Jonathan Pie, was released in 2020.

== Rescue by Boris Johnson ==
On 2 November 2009, Armstrong was threatened in the streets of north London by three girls whom she described as looking "like something straight out of central casting". They pushed her against a car and pulled out an iron bar. She cried for help and was rescued by Mayor of London, Boris Johnson, who was cycling by. He chased off the attackers and then insisted on escorting Armstrong home. During this 20-minute journey, she suggested that he adopt the 10:10 policy for the tube and that he pedestrianise Camden Town. He replied that he wanted to pedestrianise areas across London.

She thanked him with a 10:10 badge and a copy of Age of Stupid. When interviewed afterwards, she praised him as her "knight on a shining bicycle". Politically, she still preferred his predecessor Ken Livingstone, for whom she had campaigned but allowed that "If you find yourself down a dark alleyway and in trouble I think Boris would be of more use than Ken".

== Filmography ==
- McLibel, 1997 (50 min., TV) / 2005 (85 min.)
- Drowned Out, 2002 (87 min.)
- Baked Alaska, 2002 (26 min.)
- The Age of Stupid, 2009 (89 min.)
- Pie Net Zero, 2020 (14 min.)

== Awards ==
- Top 100 Women, 2011
- Guardian - Eco Hero of the Decade (nominated)
- New Statesman - 20 Green Heroes
- Evening Standard - 1,000 Most Influential Londoners
- Edie Green Personality of the year 2009
- ITN - Women in Film & TV, Achievement of the Year 2009
- Wild & Scenic, John de Graaf Environmental Filmmaker of the Year 2010
- Included in the BBC Radio 4 Woman's Hour Power list 2020.
