= Morton Valence =

British rock band

Morton Valance
- Origin: London, England, United Kingdom
- Genres: Urban Country
- Years active: 2001–present
- Labels: Whipray Records; Cargo Records (UK); Cow Pie; Bastard Recordings; Soulfood; Monika Enterprise; Cheap Date Records; Whipwray
- Members: Robert "Hacker" Jessett; Anne Gilpin; BJ Cole; Shane Gilliver; Matt Donovan
- Past members: Chuck Whobrey aka Chuck E Peru; Daryl Holley; Alan Cook; Joe Udwin; Leo Fernandez; Gigi Chang; Alejo Pelaez
- Website: http://mortonvalence.com/

Morton Valence are a London-based rock band based around the vocal pairing of songwriter, producer and multi-instrumentalist Robert 'Hacker' Jessett (ex-member of The Band of Holy Joy and Alabama 3) and Anne Gilpin. They term their music as Urban Country and were described by The Guardian as being "one of the most intriguing bands on these shores".

Founded in 2001 by Robert Jessett, Anne Gilpin and Chuck Whobrey, the band won the 2006 Fopp Award for best new band and went on to sign a record contract with Cheap Date Records. After the release of the single "Sailors" - described by the BBC as being "the best single you've never heard of the past decade" - they split from Cheap Date to form their own label, Bastard Recordings, and are an early example of an independent band who entered into a crowd funding agreement with their fans. Their 2009 single Chandelier was a BBC Radio 2 Record of the Week.

They have recorded eight full-length studio albums, all of which have been highly acclaimed in the music press, including four star reviews in Mojo Magazine Q MagazineUncut MagazineClassic Rock Magazine and an album of the year on the Chicago-based website Consequence of Sound.

In 2020 Jessett and Gilpin wrote and directed an autobiographical film documentary entitled This Is A Film About A Band that was premiered at the Doc'N Roll Film Festival in London.

Their eponymously titled eighth album was produced by legendary pedal steel guitar player BJ Cole, who also appears on the album and plays with the band intermittently.

== Discography ==
=== Albums ===
- Bob and Veronica's Big Move (2001) Whipwray
- Bob and Veronica Ride Again (2009) Bastard Recordings
- Me & Home James (2011) Bastard Recordings
- Left (2014) Bastard Recordings
- Another Country (2015) Bastard Recordings
- Europa (2017) Bastard Recordings
- Bob & Veronica's Great Escape (2019) Bastard Recordings
- Black Angel Drifter (2020) Cow Pie Ltd/Cargo Records (UK)
- Morton Valence (2022) Cow Pie Ltd/Cargo Records (UK)

=== Singles ===
- The Girl on The Escalator - as Florida - (2002) Monika Enterprise
- Sailors (2007) Cheap Date Records
- Chandelier (2009) Bastard Recordings
- Falling Down the Stairs (2009) Bastard Recordings
- Hang it on the Wall (2010) Bastard Recordings
- Christmas in Valence (2011) Bastard Recordings
- Skyline Change/Genders Blur (2019) Bastard Recordings
- Black-Eyed Susan (2020) Cow Pie Ltd/Cargo Records (UK)
- Summertime in London (2022) Cow Pie Ltd/Cargo Records (UK)
- Hey Misty (2025) Whipray Records
- Lazy Bird (2025) Whipray Records
