= McLibel case =

Legal action against and by activists

- Full case name: McDonald's Corp v Steel (No.4)
- Decided: 19 June 1997

Case history
- Prior actions: McDonald's Corporation v Steel & Morris (Trial) and 3 procedural appeals (McDonald's Corp v Steel No.1 – 3)
- Subsequent actions: Steel & Morris v United Kingdom

Court membership
- Judges sitting: Pill LJ, May LJ, Keene J

Subsequent ECHR decision
- Court: European Court of Human Rights (Fourth Section)
- Full case name: Steel & Morris v United Kingdom
- Decided: 15 February 2005
- Citation: application no. 68416/01

Court membership
- Judge sitting: M. Pellonpää (President)

Keywords
- Freedom of expression, libel, legal aid

McDonald's Corporation v Steel & Morris [1997] EWHC 366 (QB), known as "the McLibel case", was an English lawsuit for libel filed by McDonald's Corporation against environmental activists Helen Steel and David Morris (often referred to as "The McLibel Two") over a factsheet critical of the company. Each of two hearings in English courts found some of the leaflet's contested claims to be libellous and others to be true.

The original case lasted nearly ten years which, according to the BBC and The Guardian, made it the longest-running trial in English history. McDonald's announced it did not plan to collect the £40,000 it was awarded by the courts.

Following the decision, the European Court of Human Rights (ECHR) ruled in Steel & Morris v United Kingdom that the pair had been denied a fair trial, in breach of Article 6 of the European Convention on Human Rights (right to a fair trial), and their conduct should have been protected by Article 10 of the convention, which protects the right to freedom of expression. The court awarded a judgment of £57,000 against the UK government. McDonald's itself was not involved in, or a party to, this action, as applications to the ECHR are independent cases filed against the relevant state.

Franny Armstrong and Ken Loach made a documentary film, McLibel, about the case.

== History ==
=== Background ===
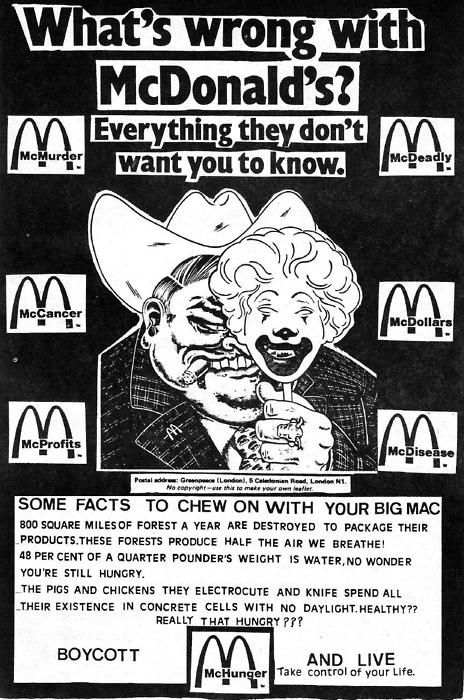
"What's wrong with McDonald's: everything they don't want you to know", the cover of the leaflet at the centre of the libel case

Helen Steel and David Morris were two environmental activists of London Greenpeace, a small environmental campaigning group that existed between 1972 and 2001. In 1986 they distributed "a few hundred copies" of a six-page leaflet titled "What's wrong with McDonald's: everything they don't want you to know" in Strand, London. The leaflet accused the company of paying low wages, cruelty to animals used in its products, damaging the environment, and other malpractices. The group were not affiliated with the larger Greenpeace International organisation, which they declined to join as they saw it as too "centralised and mainstream".

=== Libel charges ===
In 1990, McDonald's brought libel proceedings against five London Greenpeace supporters, Paul Gravett, Andrew Clarke and Jonathan O'Farrell, as well as Steel and Morris, for distributing the sheet on the streets of London. This case followed past instances in which McDonald's threatened to sue more than fifty organisations for libel, including Channel 4 television and several major publications. In all such cases, the media outlets settled and apologised.

Under English defamation law at the time, the defendant had to show that each disparaging statement made was substantively true. This could be an expensive and time-consuming process. Gravett, Clarke and O'Farrell apologised as requested by McDonald's, but Steel and Morris chose to defend the case.

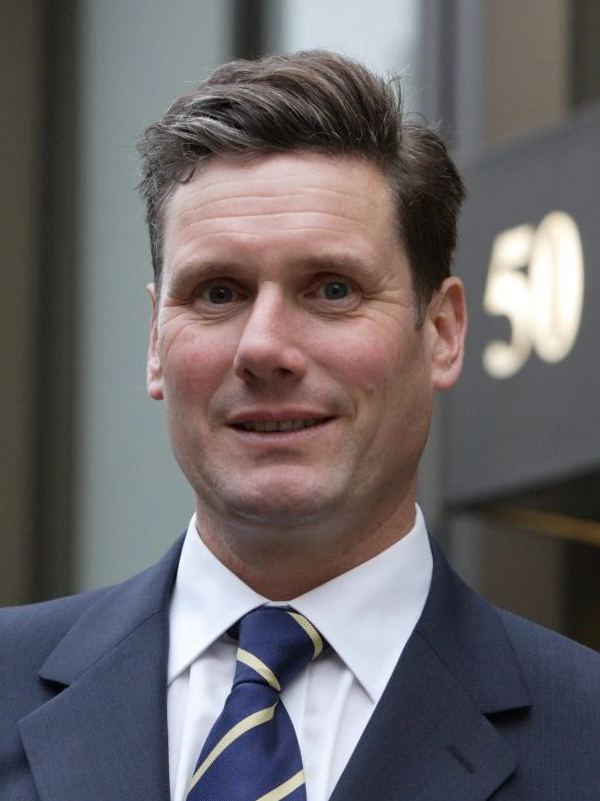
Keir Starmer provided significant pro bono assistance during the case

The two were denied legal aid, as was policy for libel cases, despite having limited income. Thus, they had to represent themselves, though they received significant pro bono assistance, including from Keir Starmer. Steel and Morris called 180 witnesses, seeking to prove their assertions about food poisoning, unpaid overtime, misleading claims about how much McDonald's recycled, and "corporate spies sent to infiltrate the ranks of London Greenpeace". McDonald's spent several million pounds, while Steel and Morris spent £30,000; this disparity in funds meant Steel and Morris were not able to call all the witnesses they wanted, especially witnesses from South America who were intended to support their claims about McDonald's activities in that continent's rainforests.

In its libel allegation, McDonald's asserted all claims in the pamphlet to be false. They found it difficult to support this position despite the indirectness of some of the claims. The case eventually became a media circus. McDonald's executives, including Ray Cesca, entered the witness box, enabling cross-examination by the defendants.

In June 1995, McDonald's offered to settle the case (which "was coming up to its [tenth] anniversary in court") by donating a large sum of money to a charity chosen by the two. They further specified they would drop the case if Steel and Morris agreed to "stop criticising McDonald's". Steel and Morris secretly recorded the meeting, in which McDonald's said the pair could criticise McDonald's privately to friends but must cease talking to the media or distributing leaflets. Steel and Morris wrote a letter in response saying they would agree to the terms if McDonald's ceased advertising its products and instead only recommended the restaurant privately to friends.

=== Judgment ===
==== High Court ====
The case was adjudicated by Mr Justice Rodger Bell. On 19 June 1997, Bell delivered his more than 1,000-page judgment largely in favour of McDonald's, finding the claims that McDonald's was responsible for starvation and deforestation were false and libellous. The ruling was summarized by a 45-page paper read in court. Steel and Morris were found liable on several points, but the judge also found some of the points in the factsheet were true. McDonald's considered this a legal victory, though it was tempered by the judge's endorsement of some of the allegations in the sheet. Specifically, Bell ruled that McDonald's endangered the health of their workers and customers by "misleading advertising", that they "exploit children", that they were "culpably responsible" in the infliction of unnecessary cruelty to animals, and they were "antipathetic" to unionisation and paid their workers low wages. Furthermore, although the decision awarded £60,000 to the company, McDonald's legal costs were much greater, and the defendants lacked the funds to pay it. Steel and Morris immediately appealed against the decision.

In 1998 a documentary film was made about the case, also titled McLibel. This was updated in 2005 after the verdict of the final appeal.

In September 1998, the pair sued the Metropolitan Police for disclosing confidential information to investigators hired by McDonald's and received £10,000 and an apology for the disclosure.

==== Court of Appeal ====
An appeal began on 12 January 1999, and lasted 23 court days, ending on 26 February. The case was heard in Court 1 of the Court of Appeal in the Royal Courts of Justice. The case was adjudicated by Lord Justices Pill and May and Mr Justice Keene. The defendants represented themselves in court, assisted by first year law student Kalvin P. Chapman (King's College London). McDonald's were represented by libel lawyer Richard Rampton, and a junior barrister, Timothy Atkinson, and Ms Pattie Brinley-Codd of Barlow, Lyde & Gilbert. Steel and Morris filed a 63-point appeal. They had requested a time extension, but were denied. The verdict for the appeal was handed down on 31 March, in Court 1 at the Royal Courts of Justice.

The judges ruled it was fair comment to say that McDonald's employees worldwide "do badly in terms of pay and conditions" and true "if one eats enough McDonald's food, one's diet may well become high in fat, etc., with the very real risk of heart disease".

As a result of their further findings against the corporation, the three Lord Justices reduced Mr Justice Bell's award of £60,000 damages to McDonald's by £20,000. The court ruled against the argument by Steel and Morris that multinational corporations should no longer be able to sue for libel over public interest issues. Steel and Morris announced their intention to appeal over these and other points to the House of Lords, and then take the UK government to the European Court of Human Rights if necessary.

In response to the verdict, David Pannick said in The Times: "The McLibel case has achieved what many lawyers thought impossible: to lower further the reputation of our law of defamation in the minds of all right thinking people."

Steel and Morris appealed to the Law Lords, arguing that their right to legal aid had been unjustly denied. When the Law Lords refused to accept the case, the pair formally retained solicitor Mark Stephens and barrister Keir Starmer to file a case with the European Court of Human Rights (ECHR), contesting the UK government's policy that legal aid was not available in libel cases, and setting out a highly detailed case for what they believed to be the oppressive and unfair nature of UK libel laws in general, and in their case in particular. In September 2004, this action was heard by the ECHR. Lawyers for Steel and Morris argued that the lack of legal aid had breached the pair's right to freedom of expression and to a fair trial.

==== European Court of Human Rights ====
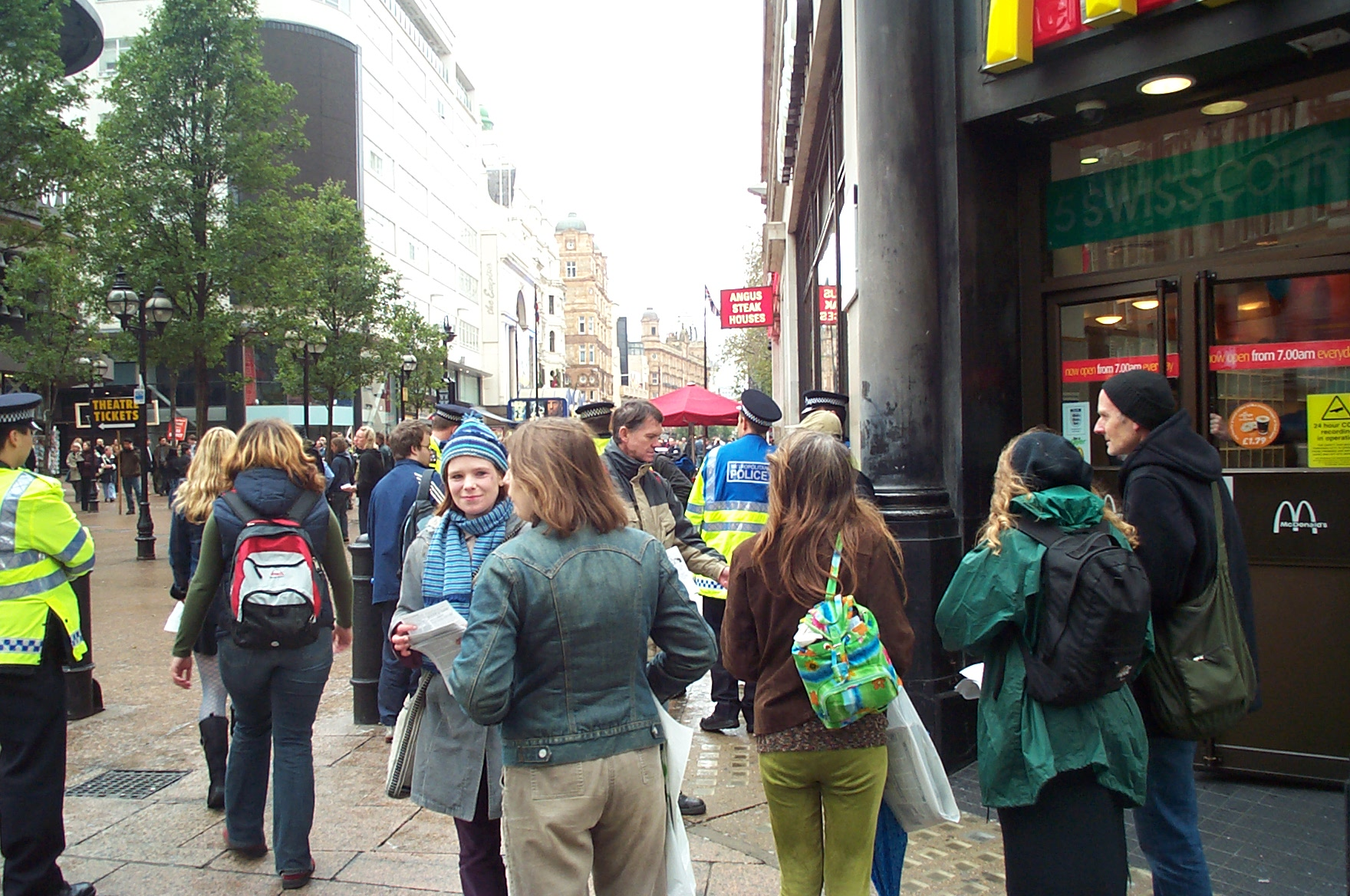
An anti-McDonald's leafleting campaign in front of the McDonald's restaurant in Leicester Square, London, during the European Social Forum season, 16 October 2004

On 15 February 2005, the European Court of Human Rights ruled that the original case had breached Article 6 (right to a fair trial) and Article 10 (right to freedom of expression) of the European Convention on Human Rights and ordered that the UK government pay Steel and Morris £57,000 in compensation. In their ruling, the ECHR criticised the way in which UK laws had failed to protect the public right to criticise corporations whose business practices affect people's lives and the environment (which violates Article 10); they also ruled that the trial was biased because of the defendants' comparative lack of resources and what they believed were complex and oppressive UK libel laws.

In particular the Court held:

in a democratic society even small and informal campaign groups, such as London Greenpeace, must be able to carry on their activities effectively and that there exists a strong public interest in enabling such groups and individuals outside the mainstream to contribute to the public debate by disseminating information and ideas on matters of general public interest such as health and the environment.

— ECHR judgment, para. 89

The safeguard afforded by Article 10 to journalists in relation to reporting on issues of general interest is subject to the proviso that they act in good faith in order to provide accurate and reliable information in accordance with the ethics of journalism ..., and the same principle must apply to others who engage in public debate.

— ECHR judgment, para. 90

It is true that large public companies inevitably and knowingly lay themselves open to close scrutiny of their acts and, as in the case of the businessmen and women who manage them, the limits of acceptable criticism are wider in the case of such companies.

— ECHR judgment, para. 94

In response to the European Court of Human Rights' decision, Steel and Morris issued the following press release:

Having largely beaten McDonald's ... we have now exposed the notoriously oppressive and unfair UK laws. As a result of the ... ruling today, the government may be forced to amend or scrap some of the existing UK laws. We hope that this will result in greater public scrutiny and criticism of powerful organisations whose practices have a detrimental effect on society and the environment. The McLibel campaign has already proved that determined and widespread grass roots protests and defiance can undermine those who try to silence their critics, and also render oppressive laws unworkable. The continually growing opposition to McDonald's and all it stands for is a vindication of all the efforts of those around the world who have been exposing and challenging the corporation's business practices.

=== Post court developments ===
In the course of the UK undercover policing relationships scandal it was revealed that one of the authors of the "McLibel leaflet" was Bob Lambert, an undercover police officer who infiltrated London Greenpeace. John Dines, another undercover officer, was Helen Steel's partner for two years; she was unaware of his true identity and motives.

The Defamation Act 2013 brought some changes to libel cases, which were expected to make it harder for corporations to abuse libel law.

The McLibel case also raised awareness about how defamation proceedings can harm the reputation of companies that raise them, similarly to the Streisand effect.

== McDonald's response ==
The McLibel film quoted McDonald's as offering little comment on the European Court decision, other than to point out that it was the Government and not McDonald's who was the losing party and that "times have changed and so has McDonald's".

On a website aiming to state its view on issues raised about it, McDonald's stated that the case is in the past and the issues more so, and that both sides in it have moved on (although Morris and Steel did continue related litigation).

== Later events ==
Chapter 5 of Paul Lewis and Rob Evans' 2012 book Undercover: The True Story of Britain's Secret Police is titled "McSpies". In recounting the history of the Special Demonstration Squad (SDS) it recounts the involvement of undercover policemen Bob Lambert and John Dines in the activities which led up to the trial. The Guardian later reported that Lambert had co-written the leaflet that was central to the libel trial. Steel has stated that Dines became treasurer of London Greenpeace.

Documents from the case showed that McDonald's private investigators had been receiving information from the Metropolitan Police. The Metropolitan Police were sued over this, which was settled out of court and with an apology and the Metropolitan Police undertaking not to share information from police computers with corporations.

== Media ==
A feature-length documentary film, McLibel, was made about the case by Franny Armstrong and Ken Loach in 1997. An extended version was produced in 2005, with estimated viewing audience of 25 million.

The documentary features courtroom reconstructions of the trial. It also features interviews with Eric Schlosser (author of the 2001 book Fast Food Nation), Morgan Spurlock (writer/director of the 2004 film Super Size Me), Keir Starmer (who provided free legal support to the McLibel defendants for many years), and Howard Lyman (who appeared on The Oprah Winfrey Show about mad cow disease).

In April 2022 the case was the subject for a programme in the BBC Radio 4 series The Reunion.

In August 2025, the case was the subject of a season of the BBC Radio 4 series Shadow World, entitled "The People vs McDonald's" that was presented by Mark Steel.

== See also ==
- English tort law
- Chilling effect
- Defamation Act 2013
- Gunns Limited v Marr & Ors – forestry company filed writ against 20 individuals and organisations for loss of reputation
- Maxime, McDuff & McDo – documentary about the unionising of a McDonald's in Montreal
- McDonald's legal cases
- Liebeck v. McDonald's Restaurants – 1994 case about a woman who suffered third-degree burns from hot coffee
- Strategic lawsuit against public participation
