= The Boy who Plays on the Buddhas of Bamiyan =

2004 film by Phil Grabsky

The Boy Who Plays on the Buddhas of Bamiyan
- Directed by: Phil Grabsky
- Produced by: Amanda Wilkie
- Cinematography: Phil Grabsky
- Edited by: Phil Reynolds
- Music by: Dimitri Tchamouroff
- Distributed by: NHK (Japan)
- Release date: 6 March 2004 (San Jose Cinequest Film Festival); United States
- Running time: 96 minutes
- Countries: United Kingdom; Afghanistan
- Languages: Dari; English

The Boy Who Plays on the Buddhas of Bamiyan is a 2004 documentary film, directed by British film maker Phil Grabsky and released on 6 March 2004 in USA.

== Plot summary ==
This film takes place over four seasons and follows Hazara refugees in Afghanistan living in squalor. The refugees, including an eight-year-old boy, are living with the legacy of the Taliban and foreign military interventions in their country.

For over 25 years, Afghanistan has been at war. Over two million civilians have been killed. In March 2001, the ruling Taliban destroyed the tallest stone statues in the world, the 'Buddhas of Bamiyan'.

Over the course of a year, this film follows the story of one of the refugees who now lives in a cave among the ruins...an 8-year-old boy called Mir.

British film-maker Phil Grabsky travelled alone to central Afghanistan a few months after the fall of the Taliban.
