= Spanner Films =

- Company type: Film production company
- Industry: Independent film
- Founded: London, UK (1997)
- Headquarters: London, United Kingdom
- Key people: Franny Armstrong; Lizzie Gillett
- Products: Documentary film
- Website: spannerfilms.net

Spanner Films is a small London-based documentary company founded by film director Franny Armstrong in 1997.

== Productions ==
The company's earliest production was McLibel (1997/2005), a documentary film about David Morris and Helen Steel, a postman and a gardener, who took on McDonald's and won the case, with courtroom reconstructions by Ken Loach. Drowned Out (2002) follows an Indian family who decide to stay at home and drown rather than make way for the Narmada Dam.

The Age of Stupid, a drama-documentary-animation hybrid film about anthropogenic climate change, was released in 2009. The film was crowd funded via a bespoke website which raised £1.5m.

Pie Net Zero, a comedic short film about climate change and biosequestration efforts in South West England written by Armstrong and comedian Tom Walker and featuring Walker’s character Jonathan Pie, was released in 2020.

== Future productions ==
In March 2014 Spanner Films announced their new project Undercovers, a television drama series about the undercover police officers who infiltrated the British activist scene for 50 years, and the women who unknowingly had long term relationships and children with the spies. The series is being written by Simon Beaufoy, Alice Nutter, and Franny Armstrong, and executive produced by Tony Garnett.
