= The Band of Holy Joy =

UK musical group

Band of Holy Joy
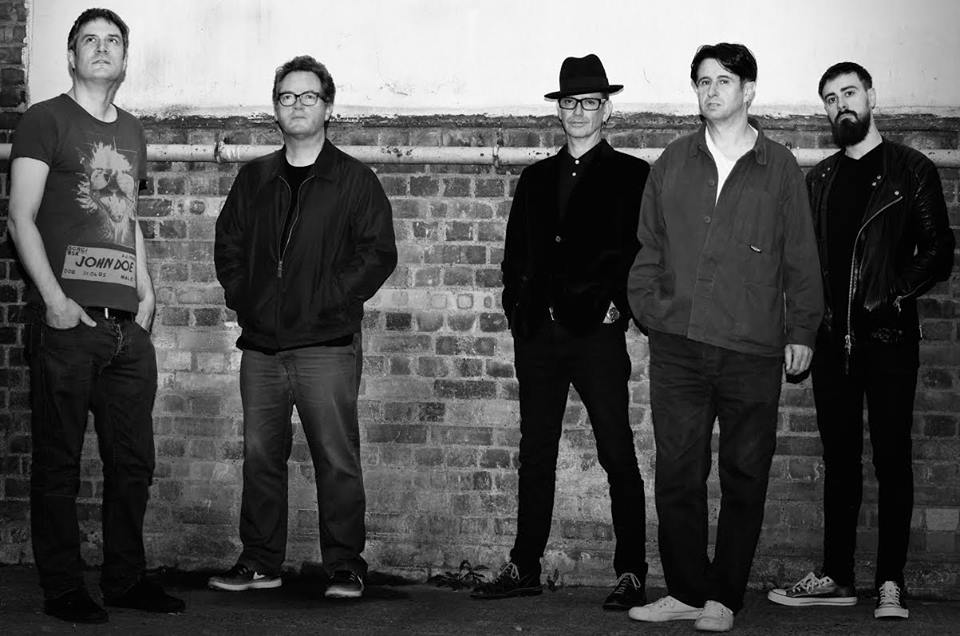
- Band of Holy Joy

Background information
- Also known as: Holy Joy
- Origin: New Cross, London
- Genres: Urban Folk music, Alternative pop, Post punk
- Years active: 1984–1993, 2002–2003, 2007–present
- Labels: Tiny Global Productions, Rough Trade, Flim Flam, Cherry Red, Exotic Pylon Records, Moloko Plus, Stereogram Recordings, Radio Joy
- Members: Johny Brown; James Stephen Finn; Peter Smith; Inga Tillere; Conor Fensom; Joseph Sergi
- Past members: Andy Astle; Chris Brierley; Alf Thomas; Karel van Bergen; John Jenkins; Brett Turnbull; Max Davies; Mark Beazley; Steve Hands; Mat Eric Hart; Adrian Bailey; Howard Jacques; Emrys Baird; William Lewington; Conor Harrington; Mark Cavener; Wendy Dunleavy; Gus Ferguson; Robert "Hacker" Jessett; Jub Jenkins; Hilary Jeffery; Louise Kleboe; Oscar Khan; Robert Lee; Paul O'Donnell; Franny Armstrong; Martine Thoquenne; Kacper Ziemianin; George Lovell; David Coulter; Howard Rickard; Paul Sampson; Tom Smith; Neil Starr; Leo Fernadez; Daryl Holley; Brenno Balbino
- Website: www.bandofholyjoy.co.uk

The Band of Holy Joy are an English band formed in New Cross, London, and initially active between 1984 and 1993, releasing several albums. In 1992, they abbreviated their name to Holy Joy. They reformed in 2002, under their original name, releasing a new album called Love Never Fails. They concentrated on other musical projects during 2003 to 2006. The band began performing live again in 2007 and since 2017 have released a number of albums on Tiny Global Productions, including Funambulist We Love You, Neon Primitives, the critically acclaimed Dreams Take Flight and Fated Beautiful Mistakes, and their latest release Scorched Jerusalem in 2025.

== History ==
The band was formed in 1984, by Johny Brown in New Cross, South London. Early experiments revolved around cheap junk shop instrumentation and rudimentary electronics. After two self-issued cassettes, they signed to South London indie label Flim Flam for a string of singles and two 1987 albums; More Tales From The City and the live LP When Stars Come Out To Play.

The band reached a commercial and critical peak after signing to Rough Trade, with Manic, Magic, Majestic in 1989, and Positively Spooked in 1990, supported by a tour of the U.S.S.R. The label was forced into receivership in 1991 following cash flow problems and eventual bankruptcy. The band re-emerged in 1992 as Holy Joy, with the album Tracksuit Vendetta. They split up in 1993 and Brown moved into freelance journalism, playwriting and production.

Band of Holy Joy reformed in 2002 and released an album Love Never Fails. After a number of live dates the band became inactive between 2003, and 2006, pursuing other musical projects. In May 2007, the band began playing live again. October 2007 saw the release of Leaves That Fall in Spring, a best of released on the Cherry Red label.

In 2008, after playing nine warm-up dates in and around London during April, May and June, the band set off to the US for the first time in their 24-year history and embarked on a successful tour of New York City. Punklore, a six-track CD was released and initially only available at the New York gigs.

In 2009, the band started to explore theatrical and multimedia based performances. As their alter ego Radio Joy, they performed two song plays Troubled Sleep and Invocation to William. Troubled Sleep was a fictional account of Sid and Nancy's last days at the Chelsea Hotel in New York. It played out over several nights in the Shunt Theatre Lounge in London and Star and Shadow Cinema in Newcastle. Invocation to William was performed at The University of London Institute in Paris at the event celebrating the 50th anniversary of William S. Burroughs' Naked Lunch, 'Lunch @ 50'. The songs from this show were released as a mini album CD A Lucky Thief in a Careless World on the band's own Radio Joy label. In October 2009, they were invited to play The Wire magazine's 'Into the Vortex' festival, followed by a series of shows in Athens, Greece, later that year.

Paramour, the band's eleventh album was released on 8 June 2010 and featured eight songs that had evolved from the song play Troubled Sleep.

In 2011, the band embarked on another tour of Greece, playing in the cities of Athens, Thessaloniki, and Larissa. They made their first appearance at Glastonbury Festival and performed their third song play Beuys Will Be Beuys in London and Thessaloniki. A CD release titled How To Kill A Butterfly was released on 28 October 2011 on Exotic Pylon Records.

On 15 March 2012, a CD release entitled The North Is Another Land was released on German independent record label Moloko Plus.

On 28 January 2013, a double cassette and digital download titled City of Tales: Volume 1 & 2 was released on Exotic Pylon Records. Volume 1 contains previously unreleased material from 1985 found by former band member Brett Turnbull, restored and accompanied by a second volume of recordings from 2012. This was followed up in 2014 with Easy Listening which was released on Exotic Pylon Records with an accompanying UK tour.

Their album The Land of Holy Joy was released through Stereogram Recordings on 21 September 2015.

Since 2017, the band have put out a series of releases on label Tiny Global Productions starting with an EP on 10" vinyl entitled Brutalism Begins at Home followed by the albums, Funambulist We Love You, Neon Primitives, Dreams Take Flight and Fated Beautiful Mistakes in 2023 which Louder Than War described as "an album that everyone should hear and hopefully take to their heart. Songs that make you feel less alone. More optimistic and free to grasp hope and love where and when you can, while you can". A new album Scorched Jerusalem was released on 17 January 2025.

Band of Holy Joy host their own radio show, Bad Punk, on Resonance FM every Friday from 10pm until 11pm.

== Musical style ==
The band's music includes elements of post-punk, folk rock, European cabaret, reflective instrumentation and epic pop, with Jacques Brel, Bertolt Brecht, Coleridge and David Peace identified as influences. Their City of Tales release has been likened to David Bowie's 1. Outside and the work of Pere Ubu. Jason Ankeny, writing for Allmusic, described the band as "urban folk". Rob Young, in the book Rough Trade, described their music as "a bohemian mix of inner city guignol, Brechtian street song, and soaring romanticism".

== Discography ==
Chart placings are from the UK Independent Chart.

=== Albums ===
- Favourite Fairytales For Juvenile Delinquents (1983) self released (cassette)
- More Favourite Fairytales (1984) Pleasantly Surprised (cassette)
- Into The City of Tales (1985) (cassette) (Unreleased)
- The Big Ship Sails (1986) Flim Flam (10-inch mini-LP)
- More Tales From The City (1987) Flim Flam - no. 8
- When Stars Come Out To Play (1987) Flim Flam
- The Devil and the Deep Blue Sea (1988) (cassette) Cause For Concern
- Manic, Magic, Majestic (1989) Rough Trade - no. 7
- Positively Spooked (1990) Rough Trade
- Tracksuit Vendetta (1992) Ecuador
- Love Never Fails (2002) Rough Trade
- Leaves That Fall in Spring - Seminal Moments (2007) Cherry Red
- Punklore (2008) 6 track CD available during US tour
- Paramour (2010) Radio Joy
- How To Kill A Butterfly (2011) Exotic Pylon
- The North is Another Land (2012) Moloko Plus
- City of Tales: Volume 1 & 2 (2013) Exotic Pylon (Limited double cassette and digital download)
- Easy Listening (2014) Exotic Pylon
- The Land of Holy Joy (2015) Stereogram Recordings
- The Clouds that Break the Sky (2017) - compilation of recordings for Flim Flam
- Funambulist We Love You (2017) Tiny Global Productions
- Neon Primitives (2019) Tiny Global Productions
- Dreams Take Flight (2021) Tiny Global Productions
- Everyone Is Searching For Beautiful Things (2021) Tiny Global Productions
- Fated Beautiful Mistakes (2023) Tiny Global Productions
- Scorched Jerusalem (2025) Tiny Global Productions

=== Singles/EPs ===
- Had a Mother Who Was Proud (1985) Flim Flam (12-inch EP)
- Who Snatched The Baby? (1986) Flim Flam - no. 25
- Rosemary Smith (1987) Flim Flam - no. 17
- Tactless (1988) Rough Trade
- Evening World Holiday Show (1989) Rough Trade
- Real Beauty Passed Through (1990) Rough Trade (12-inch EP)
- Claudia Dreams (1992) Ecuador (12-inch)
- It's Lovebite City (1992) Rough Trade (7-inch)
- A Lucky Thief in a Careless World (2009) Radio Joy (CD limited to 500 copies)
- On What a Thing This Heart of Man (2011) Radio Joy (Digital download)
- On the Ground Where John Wesley Walked (2011) Radio Joy (Digital download)
- Wyrd Beautiful Thyme/A Clean White Shirt (2012) Exotic Pylon (7-inch and digital download)
- Open The Door To Your Heart (2014) Radio Joy (Digital Download)
- When A Gift Is A Curse (2014) Radio Joy (Digital Download)
- A Place Called Home (2014) Radio Joy (Digital Download)
- Land of Holy Joy (2014) Radio Joy (Digital Download)
- Isn't That Just The Life (2015) Stereogram Recordings (Digital Download)
- Brutalism Begins at Home (2017) Tiny Global Productions (10-inch and digital download)
