= McLibel (film) =

1997 British film by Franny Armstrong and Ken Loach

- Directed by: Franny Armstrong; Ken Loach
- Produced by: Franny Armstrong
- Starring: Helen Steel; David Morris; Eric Schlosser; Keir Starmer; Morgan Spurlock; Oliver Ford Davies
- Edited by: David G. Hill; Gregers Sall
- Release dates: 1997 (TV version); 2005 (Extended version)
- Running time: 50 minutes (Television version); 85 minutes (Extended version)
- Country: United Kingdom
- Language: English

McLibel (also known as McLibel: Two People Who Wouldn't Say Sorry) is a British documentary film directed by Franny Armstrong and Ken Loach for Spanner Films about the McLibel case. The film was first completed in 1997 as a 52-minute television version after the conclusion of the original McLibel trial. It was then extended with new footage to 85-minute feature length in 2005, after the McLibel defendants took their case to the European Court of Human Rights.

== Production ==
The 1997 version was shown at film festivals worldwide, and sold to TV in about ten countries. The 2005 extended version was released theatrically in the UK, U.S., Australia, and other countries and sold to TV around the world, notably to BBC 2 (as part of their prestigious "Storyville Classics" season, where it achieved one million viewers at 10pm on a Sunday night) and CBC in Canada.

McLibel features courtroom reconstructions of the trial directed by well-known UK film director Ken Loach, who gave his time for free. It also features interviews with Eric Schlosser (author of the 2001 book Fast Food Nation), Morgan Spurlock (writer/director of the 2004 film Super Size Me), Keir Starmer (who provided free legal support to the McLibel defendants for many years), and Howard Lyman of Oprah/Mad Cow infamy.

== Release ==
McLibel was broadcast on BBC 2 in 2005, to an estimated 1 million viewers. It was then also broadcast on TV in 15 countries – including Australia, Canada and the USA – and released on DVD worldwide. McLibel was released in cinemas and DVD stores in the U.S in summer 2005 and this was followed in the UK in 2006.

== Reception ==
As of August 2004, the producers estimate that more than 25 million people have seen the film.

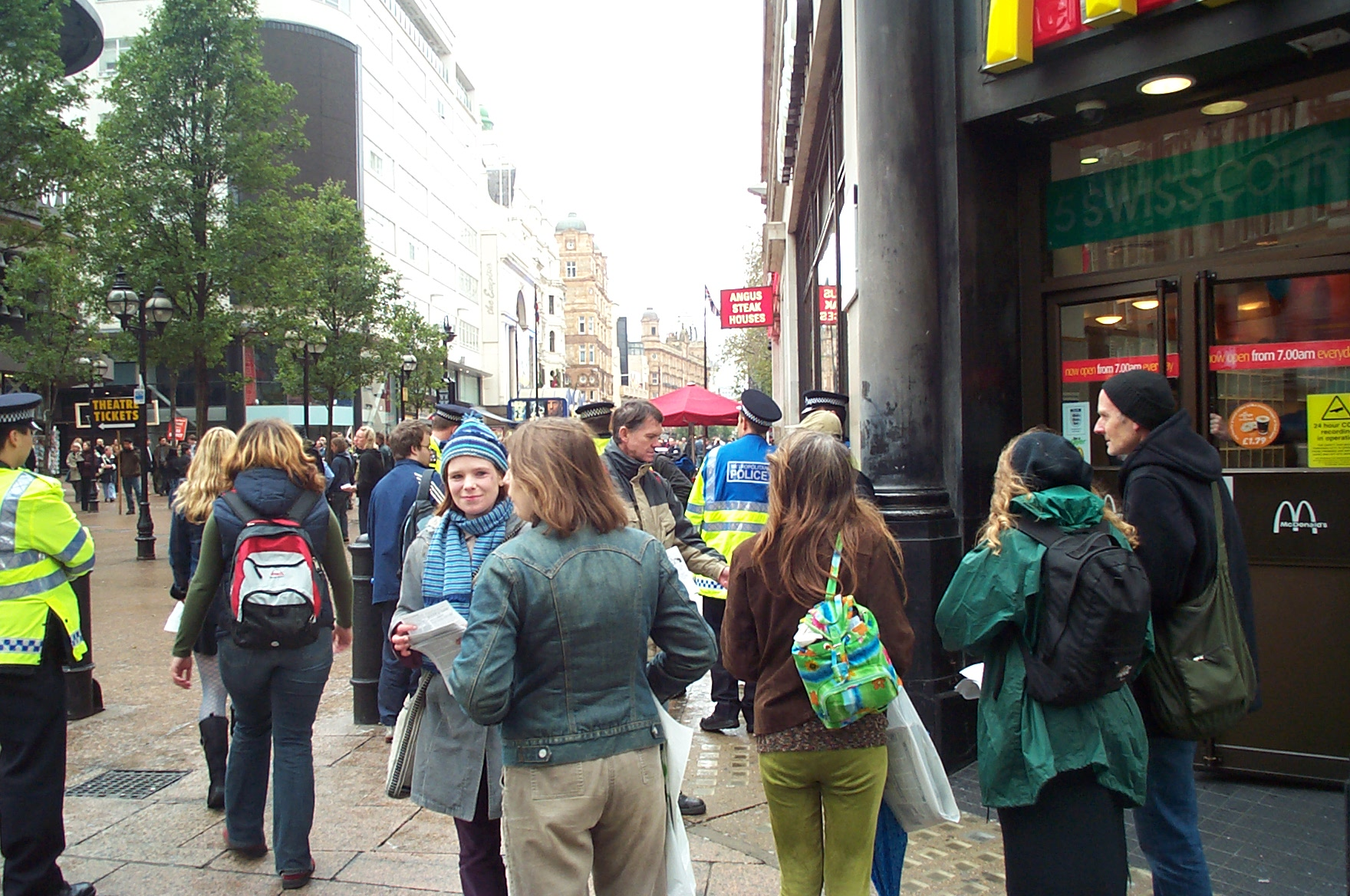
An anti-McDonald's leaflet campaign in front of the McDonald's restaurant in Leicester Square, London, during the European Social Forum season, October 2004

The film has a 100% positive rating on the review aggregator website Rotten Tomatoes, based on 10 reviews. Metacritic gave the film a rating of 81% based on 4 reviews.

Dennis Harvey of Variety magazine describes it as "an alarming if ultimately inspiring David-and-Goliath parable for today".

Wendy Ide in The Times described McLibel as “a very watchable little film about a big battle”. The Seattle Times said “An irresistible David and Goliath tale ... you can’t help but cheer along”, and The Sydney Morning Herald called it “An extraordinary example of independent filmmaking”. A Time Out London reviewer said “a radical screen full that will satisfy both head and heart”.

McLibel was nominated for numerous awards, including the Grierson Documentary Award (Grierson Awards) and the British Independent Film Awards. It was picked for the British Film Institute's prestigious series, "Ten Documentaries which Changed the World".

== Home media ==
The DVD version was released in 2005 and features more than six hours of extras, including a spoof McDonald's commentary track from comedian Rob Newman.
