= Erasing David =

- Directed by: David Bond; Melinda McDougall
- Produced by: David Bond; Beadie Finzi; Maxyne Franklin; Ashley Jones; Rebecca Lloyd-Evans; Melinda McDougall
- Cinematography: Annemarie Lean-Vercoe; Gavin Northover
- Edited by: Steve Barclay; Wojciech Duczmal
- Music by: Michael Nyman
- Production company: Green Lions
- Release date: 26 September 2010 (EIFF)
- Country: United Kingdom
- Language: English

Erasing David is a 2010 dramatized documentary (docufiction) film from the United Kingdom. Stating that as of today the UK is "one of the three most intrusive surveillance states in the world, after China and Russia", director and performer David Bond tries to put the system to the test. After anonymously setting up private investigators Cerberus Investigations Limited to trace him, he tries to disappear.
