= Soviet influence on the peace movement =

Through the World Peace Council and other front organizations

During the Cold War (1947–1991), when the Soviet Union and the United States were engaged in an arms race, the Soviet Union promoted its foreign policy through the World Peace Council and other front organizations. This has also influenced non-aligned peace groups in the West.

== Russian Revolution and the Polish-Soviet War ==
The Bolsheviks aimed at spreading their revolution by the use of force, linking the revolution in Russia with an expected revolution in Germany and assisting other Communist movements in Western Europe. Poland, in particular, was the geographical bridge that the Red Army would have to cross in order to do so, and thus Soviets had been preparing their own strike against Poland even before the Polish Kiev offensive; they planned to take over Galicia, and use the conquered ethnic Polish territories as a springboard for the invasion of Germany and other European countries.

However, the Soviet propaganda, aimed at the international scene, would deny any visions of conquest and pro-Soviet sympathizers would stage various protests in Western European countries against their government actions which aimed to support Poland against the Soviet advance. Eventually, the Soviets were defeated at the battle of Warsaw, but they learned from the war of the importance of foreign propaganda that could sway Western public opinion, and would continue to use similar strategies in the future.

== The World Peace Council ==
The World Peace Council (WPC) was set up by the Soviet Communist Party in 1948–50 to promote Soviet foreign policy and to campaign against nuclear weapons at a time when only the USA had them. The WPC was directed by the International Department of the Soviet Communist Party via the Soviet Peace Committee, a WPC member. The WPC and its members took the line laid down by the Cominform that the world was divided between the peace-loving Soviet Union and the warmongering United States. From the 1950s until the late 1980s the Soviet Union used numerous organizations associated with the WPC to spread its view of peace. They included:

- Christian Peace Conference
- International Federation of Resistance Fighters
- International Institute for Peace
- International Organization of Democratic Lawyers
- International Organization of Journalists
- International Union of Students
- World Federation of Democratic Youth
- World Federation of Scientific Workers
- World Federation of Trade Unions
- Women's International Democratic Federation
- World Peace Esperanto Movement.

In October 1981, the Danish authorities expelled Vladimir Merkulov, a Soviet Embassy second secretary and KGB operative, whom they charged with passing money to Arne Herløv Petersen, a member of the WPC's Danish affiliate, the Copenhagen-based Liaison Committee for Peace and Security, to finance a newspaper campaign calling for the establishment of a Nordic nuclear weapons-free zone.

Other international peace organizations have been said to be associated with the WPC as well. International Physicians for the Prevention of Nuclear War is said to have had "overlapping membership and similar policies" to the WPC. The Pugwash Conferences on Science and World Affairs and the Dartmouth Conferences were said to have been used by Soviet delegates to promote Soviet propaganda. Joseph Rotblat, one of the leaders of the Pugwash movement, said that there were a few participants in Pugwash conferences from the Soviet Union "who were obviously sent to push the party line, but the majority were genuine scientists and behaved as such".

The main activity of the WPC was organizing enormous international peace conferences with thousands in attendance; they condemned western military action, armaments and weapons tests but refrained from criticizing Russian aggression. For example, in 1956 the WPC condemned the Suez Crisis but not the Russian invasion of Hungary.

Because of the energetic propaganda of the WPC from the late 1940s onwards, with its big conferences and budget from the Soviet Union, some observers saw no difference between a peace activist and a communist. It was said by some that the peace movement in the West distinct from the WPC was influenced by or even led by it; for example, US President Ronald Reagan said that the peace demonstrations in Europe in 1981 were sponsored by the WPC and Soviet defector Vladimir Bukovsky said that they were co-ordinated at the WPC's 1980 World Parliament of Peoples for Peace in Sofia. The FBI reported to the United States House Permanent Select Committee on Intelligence that the WPC-affiliated U.S. Peace Council was one of the organizers of a large 1982 peace protest in New York City, but said that the KGB had not manipulated the American movement "significantly."

In the heyday of the WPC, from the late 1940s to the early 1960s, co-operation between western groups and the WPC was actually very limited, and because the non-aligned movement "was constantly under threat of being tarnished by association with avowedly pro-Soviet groups", many individuals and organizations "studiously avoided contact with communists and fellow-travellers." As early as 1949 the World Pacifist Meeting warned against active collaboration with Communists. Western delegates at WPC conferences who tried to criticize the Soviet Union or the WPC's defence of Russian armaments were often shouted down and they gradually dissociated themselves from the WPC. Finally, after confrontation between western and Soviet delegates at the 1962 World Congress for Peace and Disarmament, organised by the WPC in Moscow, forty non-aligned organizations decided to form a new international body, the International Confederation for Disarmament and Peace, to which Soviet delegates were not invited.

Rainer Santi, in his history of the International Peace Bureau, writes that the WPC "always had difficulty in securing cooperation from West European and North American peace organisations because of its obvious affiliation with Socialist countries and the foreign policy of the Soviet Union. Especially difficult to digest, was that instead of criticising the Soviet Union's unilaterally resumed atmospheric nuclear testing in 1961, the WPC issued a statement rationalising it. In 1979 the World Peace Council explained the Soviet invasion of Afghanistan as an act of solidarity in the face of Chinese and US aggression against Afghanistan." It was suggested by a former secretary of the WPC that it simply failed to connect with the western peace movement. It was said to have used most of its funds on international travel and lavish conferences, to have poor intelligence on Western peace groups, and, even though its HQ was in Helsinki, to have no contact with Finnish peace organizations.

== Wider Soviet influence ==
In 1951 the House Committee on Un-American Activities published The Communist "Peace" Offensive, which detailed the activities of the WPC and of numerous affiliated organisations. It listed dozens of American organisations and hundreds of Americans who had been involved in peace meetings, conferences and petitions. It noted, "that some of the persons who are so described in either the text or the appendix withdrew their support and/or affiliation with these organizations when the Communist character of these organizations was discovered. There may also be persons whose names were used as sponsors or affiliates of these organizations without permission or knowledge of the individuals involved."

In 1982, The Heritage Foundation published Moscow and the Peace Offensive, which said that non-aligned peace organizations advocated similar policies on defence and disarmament to the Soviet Union. It argued that "pacifists and concerned Christians had been drawn into the Communist campaign largely unaware of its real sponsorship."

Russian GRU defector Stanislav Lunev said in his autobiography that "the GRU and the KGB helped to fund just about every antiwar movement and organization in America and abroad," and that during the Vietnam War the USSR gave $1 billion to American anti-war movements, more than it gave to the VietCong, although he does not identify any organisation by name. Lunev described this as a "hugely successful campaign and well worth the cost". The former KGB officer Sergei Tretyakov said that the Soviet Peace Committee funded and organized demonstrations in Europe against US bases. According to Time magazine, a US State Department official estimated that the KGB may have spent $600 million on the peace offensive up to 1983, channeling funds through national Communist parties or the World Peace Council "to a host of new antiwar organizations that would, in many cases, reject the financial help if they knew the source." Richard Felix Staar in his book Foreign Policies of the Soviet Union says that non-communist peace movements without overt ties to the USSR were "virtually controlled" by it. Lord Chalfont said that the Soviet Union was giving the European peace movement £100 million a year. The Federation of Conservative Students (FCS) alleged Soviet funding of the Campaign for Nuclear Disarmament (CND).

U.S. plans in the late 1970s and early 1980s to deploy Pershing II missiles in Western Europe in response to the Soviet SS-20 missiles were contentious, prompting Paul Nitze, the American negotiator, to suggest a compromise plan for nuclear missiles in Europe in the celebrated "walk in the woods" with Soviet negotiator Yuli Kvitsinsky, but the Soviets never responded. Kvitsinsky would later write that, despite his efforts, the Soviet side was not interested in compromise, calculating instead that peace movements in the West would force the Americans to capitulate.

In November 1981, Norway expelled a suspected KGB agent who had offered bribes to Norwegians to get them to write letters to newspapers denouncing the deployment of new NATO missiles.

In 1985 Time magazine noted "the suspicions of some Western scientists that the nuclear winter hypothesis was promoted by Moscow to give antinuclear groups in the U.S. and Europe some fresh ammunition against America's arms buildup." Sergei Tretyakov said that the data behind the nuclear winter scenario was faked by the KGB and spread in the west as part of a campaign against Pershing II missiles. He said that the first peer-reviewed paper in the development of the nuclear winter hypothesis, "Twilight at Noon" by Paul Crutzen and John Birks (1982), was published as a result of this KGB influence.

== Western intelligence assessments ==
In 1967, a CIA report on the US peace movement observed that "the Communist Party of the USA benefits from anti-US activity by Peace groups but does not appear to be inspiring them or directing them." After demonstrations against NATO missiles in West Germany in 1981, an official investigation turned up circumstantial evidence but no absolute proof of KGB involvement. Western intelligence experts concluded that the movement in Europe at that time was probably not Soviet-inspired.

In 1983, MI5 and MI6 reported to British Prime Minister Margaret Thatcher on Soviet contacts with the peace movement, based on the testimony of KGB officer Oleg Gordievsky. According to Christopher Andrew's official history of MI5, Gordievsky's evidence indicated that there was little effective contact between either the KGB or the Soviet embassy and the peace movement.

== See also ==
- All-Soviet Peace Conference
- Astroturfing
- Communist propaganda
- Congress for Cultural Freedom
- Culture during the Cold War
- Nuclear disarmament
- Opposition to the Vietnam War
- Russia and Black Lives Matter
- Useful idiot
- World Council of Churches
- World Peace Council

Soviet activity:

- Active measures
- History of Soviet and Russian espionage in the United States
- List of Soviet agents in the United States
- Mitrokhin Archive
