= Communist front =

Front organization under control of a communist party

A communist front (or a mass organization in communist parlance) is a political organization identified as a front organization, allied with or under the effective control of a communist party, the Communist International or other communist organizations. It is a structure used by Communist and left-wing parties to intervene in broader political movements. They attracted politicized individuals who were not party members but who often followed the party line and were called fellow travellers.

Vladimir Lenin originated the idea in his manifesto of 1902, What Is to Be Done? Since the party was illegal in Russia, he proposed to reach the masses through "a large number of other organizations intended for wide membership and, which, therefore, can be as loose and as public as possible". Generally called "mass organizations" by the communists themselves, these groups were prevalent from the 1920s through the 1950s, with their use accelerating during the popular front period of the 1930s. The term has also been used to refer to organizations not originally communist-controlled which after a time became so such as the American Student Union. The term was especially used by anti-communists during the Cold War.

Mao Zedong broke bitterly with the Soviet Union in the late 1950s. He set up a network of pro-Chinese, anti-Soviet parties and communist fronts that directly challenged the pro-Soviet organizations.

== International ==
Under the leadership of Grigory Zinoviev in the Kremlin, established fronts in many countries in the 1920s and after. To coordinate their activities the Communist International (Comintern) set up various international umbrella organizations (linking groups across national borders), such as the Young Communist International (youth), Profintern (trade unions), Krestintern (peasants), International Red Aid (humanitarian aid), Red Sport International (organized sports), etc. In Europe, front organizations were especially influential in Italy and France, which in 1933 became the base for Communist front organizer Willi Münzenberg. These organizations were dissolved the late 1930s or early 1940s.

Communist fronts typically attracted well-known and prestigious artists, intellectuals and other "fellow travelers" who were used to advance Party positions. Often they came to the USSR for closely controlled tours, then returned home to praise the future as revealed in the Soviet experiment.

According to Kennedy (1957), after the war, especially as the Cold War took effect around 1947, the Kremlin set up new international coordination bodies including the World Federation of Democratic Youth, International Union of Students, World Federation of Trade Unions, Women's International Democratic Federation, and the World Peace Council. Kennedy says the, "Communist 'front' system included such international organizations as the WFTU, WFDY, IUS, WIDF and WPC, besides a host of lesser bodies bringing journalists, lawyers, scientists, doctors and others into the widespread net."

The International Federation of Resistance Fighters – Association of Anti-Fascists (FIR) was designated by government agencies as a communist-influenced organization.

The World Federation of Scientific Workers (WFSW) is an international federation of scientific associations. It was a Cold War-era Communist front. The group was composed of scientists who supported communism. The federation opposed nuclear tests conducted by the United States.

The Union for repatriation of Russians abroad was Soviet front organization aimed at infiltration and control of the exiled community of White Russians.

The International Organization of Journalists (IOJ) was one of dozen front organizations launched by the Soviet Union in the late 1940s and early 1950s. It was controlled in Prague by the Central Committee of the Czechoslovak Communist Party and with many KGB agents on board was a "long hand" of Moscow.

The World Federation of Trade Unions (WFTU) was established in 1945 to unite trade union confederations across the world; it was based in Prague. While it had non-Communist unions it was largely dominated by the Soviets. In 1949 the British, American and other non-Communist unions broke away to form the rival International Confederation of Free Trade Unions. The labor movement in Europe became so polarized between the Communists unions and the Social Democratic and Christian labor unions, and front operations could no longer hide the sponsorship and they became less important.

The then president, Ronald Reagan, in 1984, on the grounds of supposedly pro-Soviet trends, left the UNESCO.

With the end of the Cold War in 1989, and the demise of the Soviet Union in 1991, funding and support systems collapsed and many front organizations shut down or were exposed. For example, post-Communist Moscow newspapers reported the World Peace Council, based in Helsinki, Finland, had received policy guidance and 90% of its funding from Moscow.

The Berlin Conference of European Catholics, originally the Berlin Conference of Catholic Christians from European countries, was a conference held on the 17 and 18 November 1964 in East Berlin and organized with the support of the GDR government and the cooperation of the GDR state security. The historian Clemens Vollnhal arranges them as a Communist front organization.

Members of the Christian Peace Conference were churches from the socialist countries as well as church communities and individuals from other countries. In the face of their initiation with the help of socialist states, which Christians were difficult to discriminate against and partly pursue, and the proximity to Marxism, the Christian Peace Conference is regarded as controversial. Historians and the media classify CPC as a Communist front organization.

During the Cold War, Mondpaca Esperantista Movado (MEM) was able to conduct official activities on behalf of Esperanto in East Bloc countries on the condition that it must support their Communist governments and the Soviet viewpoint.

The World Federation of Teachers Unions (FISE), the Organization of Solidarity with the People of Asia, Africa and Latin America (OSPAAAL) and the International Radio and Television Organisation (OIRT) were also front organisations.

== Asia ==
The Pan-Pacific Trade Union Secretariat (PPTUS) was set up in 1927 by the Profintern (the Comintern's trade union arm) with the mission of promoting Communist trade unions in China, Japan, Korea, the Philippines, Australia, New Zealand and other nations in the western Pacific. Trapeznik (2009) says the PPTUS was a "Communist-front organization" and "engaged in overt and covert political agitation in addition to a number of clandestine activities."

There were numerous Communist front organizations in Asia, many oriented to students and youth.

In Japan in the labor union movement of the 1920s, according to one historian, "The Hyogikai never called itself a communist front but in effect, this was what it was." He points out it was repressed by the government "along with other communist front groups." In the 1950s, Scalapino argues, "The primary Communist-front organization was the Japan Peace Committee." It was founded in 1949.

Consentrasi Gerakan Mahasiswa Indonesia ('Unified Movement of Students of Indonesia', abbreviated CGMI) was an organization of university students in Indonesia, linked to the Communist Party of Indonesia (PKI). CGMI was founded in 1956, through the merger of communist-led university student groups in Bogor, Bandung and Yogyakarta (which had emerged in the early 1950s). At the time of its founding, CGMI had a membership of around 1,180.

Fadjar Harapan ('Dawn of Hope') was a short-lived Indonesian pioneer organization, linked to the Communist Party of Indonesia. Fadjar Harapan was founded in 1959, albeit that there already was an existing Scouting movement initiated by the Communist Party. However, the organization was officially not connected to any political party (according to the constitution of the organization) and was open to all children between the ages of six and thirteen. The initiative to found the new organization was taken by the party leader Aidit. Cadres of the Communist Party and Pemuda Rakjat (the youth wing of the Communist Party) were given the task to study how pioneer movements functioned in other countries, but adapting Fadjar Harapan to Indonesian conditions.

Gerwani's affiliation with the Communist Party of Indonesia eventually led to their demise after the events of Gerakan 30 September, G30S and the "attempted" coup. The arrest and imprisonment of Gerwani members was justified by the fabricated involvement of Gerwani in the killings of the six generals during G30S. The Lubang Buaya myth, as described as discussed by historians, claimed that Gerwani had performed sadistic, sexual crimes before and after killing the six generals during G30S. More seriously, Lubang Buaya was used to justify the mass killings of communists in the period immediately after the G30S – an incident that also led to the demise of Gerwani.

Peasants Front of Indonesia (Indonesian: Barisan Tani Indonesia) was a peasant mass organization connected to the Communist Party of Indonesia. BTI was founded November 25, 1945. The previous peasant organization of PKI had been the Peasants Union (Serikat Tani) formed in 1945.

Bharatiya Khet Mazdoor Union literally 'Indian Land Workers Union' is a trade union of agricultural labourers in India. BKMU is politically tied to the Communist Party of India (CPI). BKMU is independent from both the main trade union central of CPI, the All India Trade Union Congress, as well as the farmers' organisation of CPI, the All India Kisan Sabha.

National Federation of Indian Women is a women's organisation. It was established in 1954 by several leaders from Mahila Atma Raksha Samiti including Aruna Asaf Ali.

The Anti-Imperialist National Democratic Front is an underground South Korean organization that is called a socialist political party by North Korea and a pro-WPK spy group by South Korea. It is the only ostensibly South Korean organization to have a mission in Pyongyang. The party is banned in South Korea, under the National Security Law, but operates clandestinely. It is similar in organization to the Democratic Front for the Reunification of the Fatherland, the de jure popular front of North Korea. It has a mission in Pyongyang, North Korea and another in Japan.

The South Korean government petitioned the Constitutional Court of Korea to dissolve the Unified Progressive Party (UPP) due to their alleged pro-North Korea views in November 2013, two months after UPP members allegedly involved in the 2013 South Korean sabotage plot were arrested. On 19 December 2014 the Constitutional Court of Korea ruled 8–1 in favour of the dissolution. The five UPP lawmakers were also deprived of their National Assembly seats. According to Amnesty International, the UPP's ban raised "serious questions as to the authorities' commitment to freedom of expression and association".

But in South Korea, communist activities are legal. there is now a legitimate Communist Party, the Socialist Revolutionary Workers' Party in South Korea. and there are legitimate organizations such as Workers' Solidarity and National Workers' Political Association.

During the Vietnam War, the National Liberation Front of South Vietnam ("Viet Cong") was an armed communist organization opposed to the South Vietnamese and United States governments.

== Latin America ==
Poppino argued that the effectiveness of Communist propaganda in Latin America "depends largely on the existence of a wide range of interlocking front groups that supplement and draw upon the Communist-led mass organizations."

When nations turned toward the Soviet Union, they typically joined in numerous international front organizations, as Nicaragua did under the Sandinistas (Socialists) in 1983.

== Sino-Soviet split ==
Mao Zedong broke bitterly with the Soviet Union in the late 1950s, accusing Nikita Khrushchev especially of revisionism and betrayal of true Marxist–Leninist principles. Mao set up a network of pro-Chinese, anti-Soviet parties and Communist fronts that directly challenged the pro-Soviet organizations in parts of Asia, Africa, and Latin America. In Thailand, the pro-Chinese Communist fronts were organized with a violent revolutionary goal in mind, but they were based in local Chinese enclaves and failed to connect with the larger population.

Despite deep ideological differences, the radical Islamists and the members of the Soviet-aligned People's Democratic Party of Afghanistan both rejected Revolutionary Association of the Women of Afghanistan (RAWA) as a Maoist organization. One reason was that its founder Meena Keshwar Kamal married the Afghanistan Liberation Organization (ALO) leader Faiz Ahmad.

== Germany ==
West Germany and West Berlin were centers of east–west conflict during the Cold War, and numerous Communist fronts were established. For example, the Society for German–Soviet Friendship (GfDSF) had 13,000 members in West Germany, but it was banned in 1953 by some Länder as a Communist front. The Democratic Cultural League of Germany started off as a series of genuinely pluralistic bodies, but in 1950–51 came under the control of Communists. By 1952 the U.S. Embassy counted 54 'infiltrated organizations', which started independently, as well as 155 'front organizations', which had been Communist inspired from their start.

The German Peace Union, DFU) the German Communist Party (DKP) was close and was also financed by the Socialist Unity Party of Germany (SED), which was however denied.

The Bund der Deutschen (BdD) was founded in 1953. Joseph Wirth and Wilhelm Elfes led the party, but there was also a strong influence of communist forces. The SED saw in the BdD a chance, similar to the concept of the National Front in the GDR, bourgeois and "national-minded" forces as a coalition partner to win. The core program of the BdD was a neutrality policy, which turned against the rearmament and the Westintegration of Germany. In contrast to the Federal Government, an agreement was reached with the Soviet Union. With the founding of the German Peace Union in 1961, in which numerous BdD politicians were involved, the BdD no longer existed as an independent political force, but was essentially limited to the publication of the German Volkszeitung. He also ran no longer in elections but sent candidates to the list of the DFU. Double memberships in BdD and DFU were expressly permitted. The constitutional protection of North Rhine-Westphalia, which observes the BdD, classified the BdD as a front-run cadre organization of the DFU in 1964. On 2 November 1968, the DKP, DFU, BdD and other left-wing groups decided to join the Joint Action Action for Democratic Progress (ADF) on the 1969 West German federal election. The membership stock, which Helmut Bausch had estimated to be around 12,000 for the years 1953 to 1955, according to a note to the Ulbricht office in 1965, have amounted to only 2,000 to 3,000.

In the peak of the Cold War in 1960, the chairman of the German wing of the Women's International League for Peace and Freedom (WILPF) referred to the Internationale Frauenliga für Frieden und Freiheit (IFFF) (and hundreds of other members of the IFFF), headed by the CDU politician Rainer Barzel together with Franz Josef Strauss (CSU) and headed by Barzel, as "communist-controlled". On the other hand, the IFFF successfully filed a complaint and Barzel had to withdraw his allegation. However, numerous women left the organization, only local groups remained in West Berlin, Hamburg, Bremen, Munich and Duisburg.

The Republikanischer Club (RC) was put up, among others, by Hubertus Knabe in his book Die Unterhanderte Republik, that the RC as a whole was influenced by the GDR or even controlled. Actually, however, the relationship between the RC and the GDR was rather disincentive, in particular one refused an approach to the SEW, the West Berlin offshoot of the SED. They and the GDR were seen as an obstacle to the new beginning of a left movement. Recent research on files from the Stasi Records Agency as well as from the estates of prominent members confirms that state security was active in West Berlin and also in the RC. It did not, however, aim at countervailing assumptions, but on a moderation of the extra-parliamentary opposition in order to be able to control them in the form of a party formation under the influence of SEW. This strategy failed, however, and the attempts to influence remained unaffected.

The Social Democratic Action (SDA), later Socialist Action, had been an opposition party in the Social Democratic Party of Germany (SPD), controlled by the SED since 1948. The work of the SDA started first in the SPD, which was authorized by the Occupying Council to build the walls throughout the city. The SDA was active both in the east and in the west of the city. In East Berlin, she temporarily appointed magistrates, mayors and other functionaries, and was even represented in the Volkskammer until 1954 with deputies. Since 1950, the organization also tried to gain a foothold in the Federal Republic of Germany, but remained a splinter group. Membership in it was declared incompatible with employment in the public service in 1950 by the Federal Government. In 1956, it was banned in the course of the KPD ban in the Federal Republic. After the erection of Berlin Wall in 1961 it also dissolved itself in the GDR.

In East Germany front operations were not directly controlled by Moscow. They were instead operated by The German Communist Party (DKP), which was in power after 1945. It took political and financial support from the SED and worked closely with the Socialist Unity Party of West Berlin (SEW), which was controlled and financed by the SED.

After the ban of KPD a few parties ran as replacement for they like the "Voter Association against Nuclear Arming" in Bremen or the Unabhängige Wählergemeinschaft in Ueberau. The Betrieblich-Alternative Liste which ran in the 1987 Bremen state election was founded by the DKP to appeal green voters.

On suspicion of being close to the DKP, members of the German Peace Society were temporarily observed in the Federal Republic of Germany by the Federal Office for the Protection of the Constitution. Some of them were denied access to public service professions as a result of the radical decree of the early 1970s.

From 10 November 1959 to 8 April 1960 were the pastor Johannes Oberhof, the former KPD official and former pastor Erwin Eckert, the interpreter Walter Diehl, the publisher Gerhard Wohlrath, the worker Gustav Tiefes, the insurance clerk Erich Kompalla and the former SPD Councilor Edith Hoereth-Menge accused by the Attorney General of their role in the Peace Committee of the Federal Republic of Germany the ringleadership in an anti-constitutional organization. This was justified in particular by the fact that some of the defendants had belonged to the now banned KPD. Their activities are therefore camouflage for the assumed by the Attorney General real goal of "establishing a communist regime in the Federal Republic".

== Austria ==
The Democratic Union was accused by the ÖVP and VdU financed by the Soviet Union, while some SPÖ parliamentarians the DU referred to as "Heimwehr fascists".

At the 1953 Austrian legislative election, the DU entered into an electoral coalition called the "People's Opposition" with the KPÖ and the Socialist Workers' Party (SAP). In fact, this alliance was supported by the Soviet occupying forces, hoping to establish a national United front, with which Austria could be transformed into a socialist state. In this fantasy, the DU should replace the ÖVP in the medium term and the SAP the SPÖ. The KPÖ was also informed about these plans. In the occupation organs Österreichische Zeitung and Welt-Illustrierte a press campaign was operated for the people's opposition. Finally, the alliance could gain in the election 5.28 percent of the vote and thus four mandates, a – measured by the support – for the Soviet Union disappointing result. Of the four mandates none went to Dobretsberger and the party lost more and more importance.

== Greece ==
The United Democratic Left (EDA) was founded the July 1951 by prominent center-left and leftist politicians, some of which were former members of ELAS. While initially EDA was meant to act as a substitute and political front of the banned Communist Party of Greece, it eventually acquired a voice of its own, rather pluralistic and moderate. This development was more clearly shown at the time of the 1968 split in the ranks of Communist Party of Greece, with almost all former members of EDA joining the faction with Euro-communist, moderate tendencies.

== Turkey ==
The Peoples' Democratic Party (HDP) maintained talks with Abdullah Öcalan, from this talks Öcalan give a message to the congress stating that "We have never considered our movement apart from Turkey's revolutionary and socialist movements. We have always regarded ourselves as an integral part of this outcome" and "we have to consider the HDP as an integral part of the historical democratic dialogue and negotiation process. If socialism and an open democracy succeed in Turkey, it will be closely related to this democratic negotiation process.". Öcalan's niece Dilek Öcalan and Öcalan's nephew Öcalan Urfa'dan were among the HDP parliamentary candidates.

The relationship between the HDP and the PKK has been put forward by the governing Justice and Development Party (AKP) as a reason why it would be better for the HDP to not gain representation in Parliament, though government journalists alleged that this would result in greater violence by the PKK and attempts to establish a separate parliament in Diyarbakır. In election posters and propaganda, the HDP has been accused of scaremongering and using the PKK to coerce voters into voting for them, stating that there would be more violence if the HDP failed to pass the election threshold. In contrast, HDP politicians also accused the AKP of scaremongering when they claimed that their affiliation to the PKK made them unfit for parliamentary representation. PKK militants have also been accused of raiding local shops and cafes in the south-east of Turkey and demanding votes for the HDP, with one civilian being wounded when a group of PKK youth militants raided a cafe in Silvan. Selahattin Demirtaş has denied having an 'organic relationship' with the PKK and claimed that the allegations of PKK militants demanding votes for the HDP from voters was untrue.

== Canada ==
The Association of United Ukrainian Canadians (AUUC) is a national cultural-educational non-profit organization established for Ukrainians in Canada. With branches throughout Canada it sponsors such cultural activities as dance groups, orchestras, choirs and children's activities within the association. The organization was pro-communist.

The Canadian Labour Defence League was a legal defence organization founded and led by Reverend A.E. Smith. The league was in 1925 as a civil rights organization dedicated to protecting striking workers from persecution. It was allied with the Communist Party of Canada and functioned as a front for the party. The group was the Canadian affiliate of International Red Aid.

The Canadian League for Peace and Democracy, led by A. A. MacLeod, was founded in October 1934 as the Canadian League Against War and Fascism, was a popular front organization founded by the Communist Party to build support for anti-fascism. The group was the Canadian affiliate of the World Committee Against War and Fascism.

The Canadian Peace Congress, founded in 1949 is the Canadian affiliate of the World Peace Council and was an important organization in the peace movement in Canada.

The Dominion Communist–Labor Total War Committee was a front organization of the then-banned Communist Party of Canada.

The Federation of Russian Canadians is a left-leaning cultural organization for Russian immigrants to Canada and their descendants. It is the successor of the Russian Farmer-Worker Clubs which were closed by the government at the beginning of World War II as a suspected subversive organization due to its links with the Communist Party of Canada. In 1942, after the Nazi invasion of the USSR, the organization reappeared as the Federation of Russian Canadians, known also by its Russian initials as the FRK.

Finnish Organization of Canada (FOC, Finnish: Kanadan Suomalainen Järjestö) is a Finnish Canadian cultural organization. It was established in 1911 as the Finnish Socialist Organization of Canada (Kanadan Suomalainen Sosialistinen Järjestö). FOC is the oldest nationwide cultural organization for Finns in Canada. It was first connected with Social Democratic Party of Canada and later with Communist Party of Canada. Today FOC is no longer associated with politics. It has fewer than 200 members, who are mostly senior citizens in the areas of Toronto, Vancouver, Sudbury and Thunder Bay.

The Relief Camp Workers' Union (RCWU) was the union into which the inmates of the Canadian government relief camps were organized in the early 1930s. It was affiliated with the Workers' Unity League, the trade union umbrella of the Communist Party of Canada. The organization is best known for organizing the On-to-Ottawa Trek during the Great Depression.

The United Jewish People's Order is a secular socialist Jewish cultural, political and educational fraternal organization in Canada. The UJPO traces its history to 1926 and the founding of the Jewish Labour League Mutual Benefit Society. It was for many years associated with the Labor-Progressive Party, as the Communist Party of Canada was known.

== United Kingdom ==
The general secretary Albert Fava of the Gibraltar Confederation of Labour was deported by the Governor on the grounds of being a member of the Communist Party.

== Australia ==
Davidson argues that in Australia with the onset of the Great Depression, "Support for Communist front organizations increased." Examples include the Movement Against War and Fascism and the Australian Writers' League.

British intelligence infiltrated several Communist fronts in Australia, looking for organized efforts to block Britain's Cold War policies.

== United States ==
The Hollywood Anti-Nazi League was a communist front organization, run by the American popular front, it attracted broad support in Hollywood from both members and nonmembers of the Communist Party USA (CPUSA). Like many such communist front groups, it ceased all anti-Nazi activities immediately upon the signing of the Molotov–Ribbentrop Pact in August 1939.

Contemporary Historians Inc. was a 1937 active American film company, who financed a single film, The Spanish Earth by Joris Ivens, during their existence. Joris Ivens came from the Netherlands, alongside the Contemporary Historians, the United States John Dos Passos, Archibald MacLeish, Clifford Odets, Lillian Hellman, Herman Shumlin and Ernest Hemingway, the latter largely independently, while all remaining in contact with the Communist Party USA or one of their communist front organizations. In 1931, during his time with Mezhrabpomfilm Otto Katz, Ivens had become acquainted with the Machtergreifung in Hollywood through his lectures Anti-fascist and the Comintern took a footing there.

A report of the Special Committee on Un-American Activities of the United States House of Representatives published a four-pronged definition of a "Communist front" in March 1944. Frequently repeated in official government documents, this definition asserted that Communist fronts shared (1) a common origin; (2) organization upon a "Communist pattern"; (3) interlocking personnel; and (4) methods intended to deceive the public.

Historian Bernard K. Johnpoll states:

Thousands of Americans joined Communist fronts during the 1930s. Few of them realized the true nature of the organizations they joined. The fronts paraded as independent, nonpartisan groups under the facade of non-Communist control. They were actually satellites of the Communist Party whose primary aim was to create the impression of mass support for an essential part of the party line. To maintain the illusion of non- Communist control, the formal leadership of these organizations was almost invariably composed of non-party members; the actual control was, however, in the hands of party activists.

In the late 1940s, at the start of the Cold War, the House Committee on Un-American Activities (HUAC) and the Senate Internal Security Subcommittee (SISS) investigated and listed a number of suspected organizations. In 1955, SSIS published a list of what it described as the 82 most active and typical sponsors of Communist fronts in the United States; some of those named had literally dozens of affiliations with groups that had either been cited as Communist fronts or had been labelled "subversive" by either the Subcommittee or the House Committee on Un-American Activities.

Schrecker says that anti-Communist leaders believed that the Party used front groups to attract "fellow travelers," who were "unsuspecting liberals and well-meaning dupes drawn into the Communist orbit without realizing that the Party was using them for its own purposes." Schrecker says that on the contrary, "most of these people knowingly collaborated with the party, believing it to be the most effective ally they could find." Theodore Draper asks, "To what extent was it possible, at least in the nineteen-twenties, to belong to a Communist front without being a Communist sympathizer?" His answer is that, "Only the most naive could have belonged to a front for any considerable length of time without realizing its political coloration. The top leaders of the early fronts were not merely Communists; they were top-ranking Communists."

=== Attorney General list of alleged communist fronts, 1948 ===
Starting in 1939, Attorney General Biddle began compiling a list of Fascist and Communist front organizations. It was called "Attorney General's List of Subversive Organizations" (AGLOSO), but was not at first made public. Political pressures from Congress forced President Harry S. Truman to act. Truman's Attorney General Tom C. Clark expanded the list, which was officially authorized by presidential Executive Order 9835 in 1947 and was administered by the new Loyalty Review Board. The Board became part of the Civil Service Commission. The list was used by federal agencies to screen appointments during the Truman Administration. The program investigated over 3 million government employees, of whom 300 were dismissed as security risks. Adverse decisions could be appealed to the Loyalty Review Board, a government agency set up by President Truman.

On March 20, 1948, the Loyalty Review Board published the previously secret Attorney General's "List of Communist classified organizations" in The Federal Register. This list included the name and date founded, as well as headquarters address and names of chief officers for active groups. The complete list included about 200 organizations.

Attorney General's consolidated list November 1, 1955, includes also wartime German, Japanese, and Italian influenced organizations as well as white nationalist groups:

=== Alleged CPUSA front organizations, c. 1980 ===
Late in the Cold War, Richard Felix Staar alleged that Soviet intelligence had infiltrated many peace movements in the West, most importantly, the World Peace Council. In addition to WPC, important communist front organizations included its affiliate the U.S. Peace Council, the World Federation of Trade Unions, the World Federation of Democratic Youth, and the International Union of Students. Staar asserted that somewhat less important front organizations included: Afro-Asian People's Solidarity Organisation, Christian Peace Conference, International Association of Democratic Lawyers, International Federation of Resistance Movements, International Institute for Peace, International Organization of Journalists, Women's International Democratic Federation and World Federation of Scientific Workers. Numerous peace conferences, congresses and festivals have been staged with support of those organizations.

== See also ==
- Agent of influence
- Communist International
- English-language press of the Communist Party USA
- Entryism
- McCarthyism
- Non-English press of the Communist Party USA
