= World Peace Council =

International disarmament organization

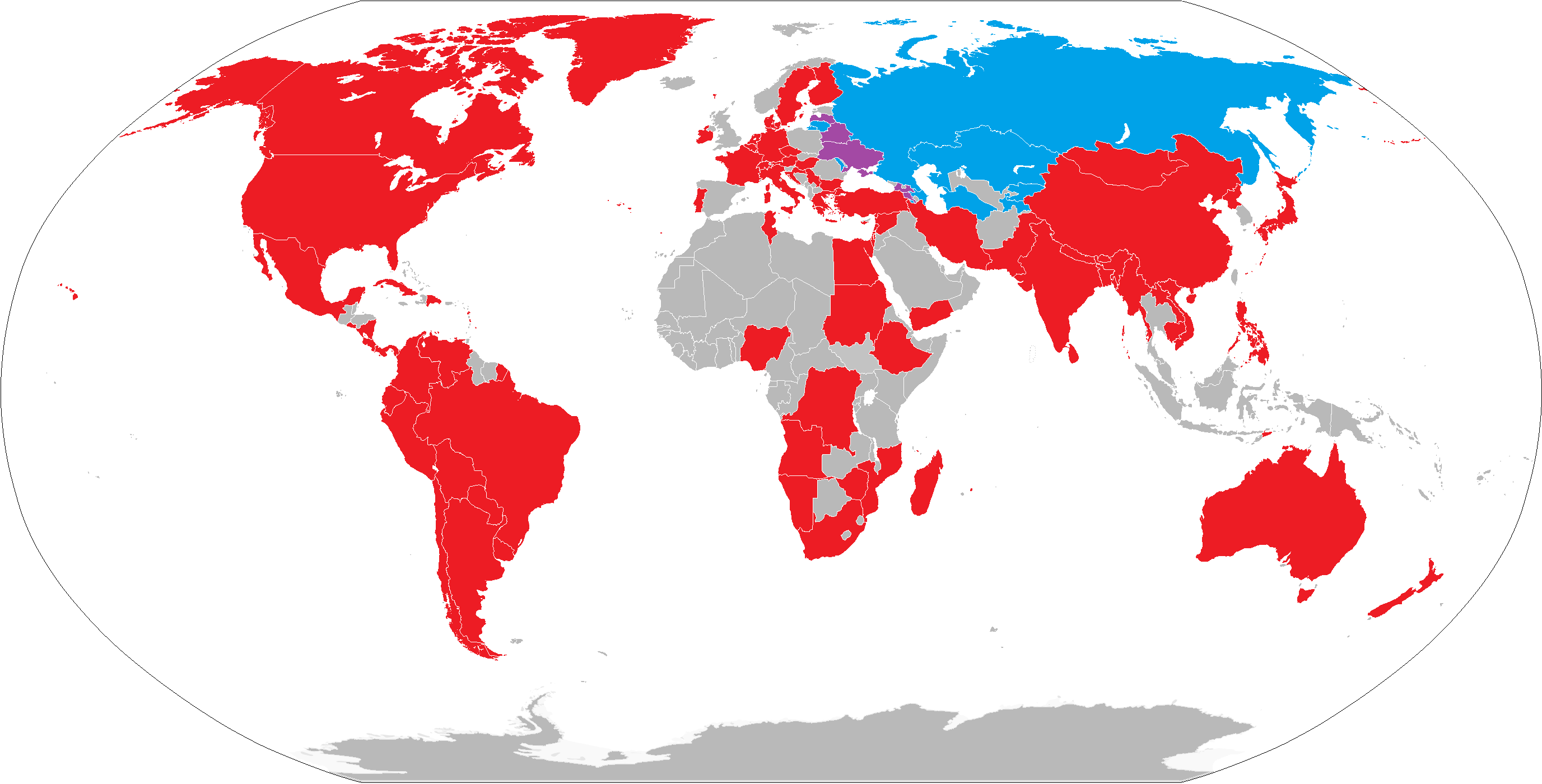
Membership in the World Peace Council: National affiliates Affiliates of the International Federation for Peace and Conciliation Countries with both national affiliates and the IFPC

The World Peace Council (WPC) is an international organization created in 1949 by the Cominform and propped up by the Soviet Union. Throughout the Cold War, WPC engaged in propaganda efforts on behalf of the Soviet Union, whereby it criticized the United States and its allies while defending the Soviet Union's involvement in numerous conflicts.

The organization had the stated goals of advocating for universal disarmament, sovereignty, independence, peaceful co-existence, and campaigns against imperialism, weapons of mass destruction and all forms of discrimination. The organization's propagandizing for the USSR led to the decline of its influence over the peace movement in non-Communist countries.

Its first president was the French physicist and activist Frédéric Joliot-Curie. It was based in Helsinki, Finland, from 1968 to 1999, and since in Athens, Greece.

== History ==
=== Origins ===
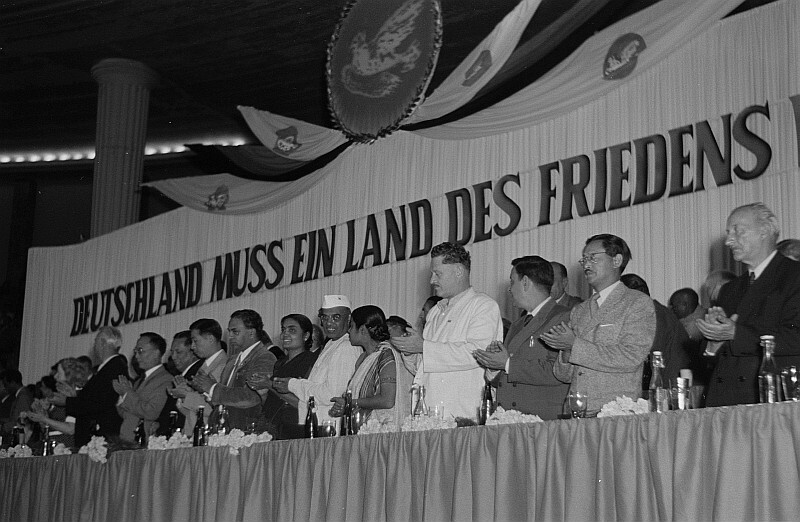
A WPC Congress in East Berlin on 1 July 1952 showing Picasso's dove above the stage, banner reading "Germany must be a land of Peace"

In August 1948 through the initiative of the Communist Information Bureau (Cominform) a "World Congress of Intellectuals for Peace" was held in Wrocław, Poland.

This gathering established a permanent organisation called the International Liaison Committee of Intellectuals for Peace—a group which joined with another international Communist organisation, the Women's International Democratic Federation to convene a second international conclave in Paris in April 1949, a meeting designated the World Congress of Partisans for Peace (Congrès Mondial des Partisans de la Paix). Some 2,000 delegates from 75 countries were in attendance at this foundation gathering in the French capital.

A new permanent organization emerged from the April 1949 conclave, the World Committee of Partisans for Peace. At a Second World Congress held in Warsaw in November 1950, this group adopted the new name World Peace Council (WPC). The origins of the WPC lay in the Cominform's doctrine that the world was divided between "peace-loving" progressive forces led by the Soviet Union and "warmongering" capitalist countries led by the United States, declaring that peace "should now become the pivot of the entire activity of the Communist Parties", and most western Communist parties followed this policy.

In 1950, Cominform adopted the report of Mikhail Suslov, a senior Soviet official, praising the Partisans for Peace and resolving that, "The Communist and Workers' Parties must utilize all means of struggle to secure a stable and lasting peace, subordinating their entire activity to this" and that "Particular attention should be devoted to drawing into the peace movement trade unions, women's, youth, cooperative, sport, cultural, education, religious and other organizations, and also scientists, writers, journalists, cultural workers, parliamentary and other political and public leaders who act in defense of peace and against war."

Lawrence Wittner, a historian of the post-war peace movement, argues that the Soviet Union devoted great efforts to the promotion of the WPC in the early post-war years because it feared an American attack and American superiority of arms at a time when the US possessed the atom bomb but the Soviet Union had not yet developed it. This was in opposition to the theory that America had no plans to attack anyone, and the purpose of the WPC was to disarm the US and the NATO alliance for a future Soviet attack.

==== Wrocław 1948 and New York 1949 ====
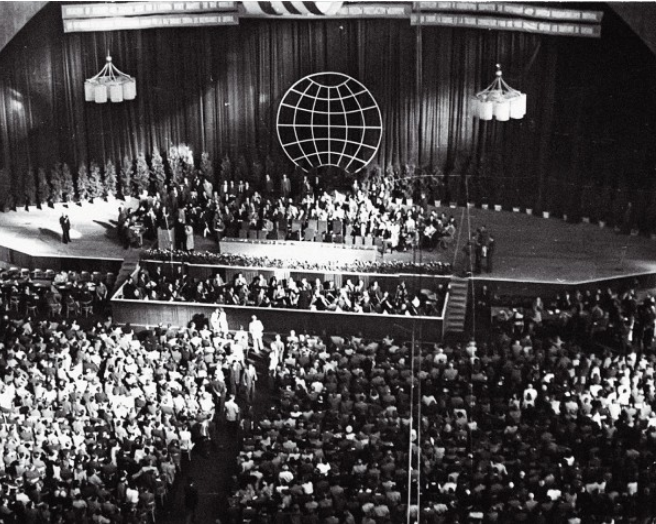
Session of the World Congress of Intellectuals for Peace in Wrocław in 1948

The World Congress of Intellectuals for Peace met in Wrocław on 6 August 1948. Julian Huxley, the chair of UNESCO, chaired the meeting in the hope of bridging Cold War divisions, but later wrote that "there was no discussion in the ordinary sense of the word." Speakers delivered lengthy condemnation of the West and praises of the Soviet Union. Albert Einstein had been invited to send an address, but when the organisers found that it advocated world government and that his representative refused to change it, they substituted another document by Einstein without his consent, leaving Einstein feeling that he had been badly used.

The Congress elected a permanent International Committee of Intellectuals in Defence of Peace (also known as the International Committee of Intellectuals for Peace and the International Liaison Committee of Intellectuals for Peace) with headquarters in Paris. It called for the establishment of national branches and national meetings along the same lines as the World Congress. In accordance with this policy, a Cultural and Scientific Conference for World Peace was held in New York City in March 1949 at the Waldorf Astoria Hotel, sponsored by the National Council of Arts, Sciences and Professions.

==== Paris and Prague 1949 ====
The World Congress of Partisans for Peace in Paris (20 April 1949) repeated the Cominform line that the world was divided between "a non-aggressive Soviet group and a war-minded imperialistic group, headed by the United States government". It established a World Committee of Partisans for Peace, led by a twelve-person Executive Bureau and chaired by Professor Frédéric Joliot-Curie, a Nobel Prize-winning physicist, High Commissioner for Atomic Energy and member of the French Institute. Most of the Executive were Communists. One delegate to the Congress, the Swedish artist B. v. Beskow, heard no spontaneous contributions or free discussions, only prepared speeches, and described the atmosphere there as "agitated", "aggressive" and "warlike". A speech given at Paris by Paul Robeson—the polyglot lawyer, folksinger, and actor son of a runaway slave—was widely quoted in the American press for stating that African Americans should not and would not fight for the United States in any prospective war against the Soviet Union; following his return, he was subsequently blacklisted and his passport confiscated for years. The Congress was disrupted by the French authorities who refused visas to so many delegates that a simultaneous Congress was held in Prague." Robeson's performance of "The March of the Volunteers" in Prague for the delegation from the incipient People's Republic of China was its earliest formal use as the country's national anthem. Picasso's lithograph, La Colombe (The Dove) was chosen as the emblem for the Congress and was subsequently adopted as the symbol of the WPC.

==== Sheffield and Warsaw 1950 ====
In 1950, the World Congress of the Supporters of Peace adopted a permanent constitution for the World Peace Council, which replaced the Committee of Partisans for Peace. The opening congress of the WPC condemned the atom-bomb and the American involvement in the Korean War. The WPC was used by the Soviet Union to promote baseless claims that the United States used biological weapons in the Korean War.

It followed the Cominform line, recommending the creation of national peace committees in every country, and rejected pacifism and the non-aligned peace movement. It was originally scheduled for Sheffield but the British authorities, who wished to undermine the WPC, refused visas to many delegates and the Congress was forced to move to Warsaw. British Prime Minister Clement Attlee denounced the Congress as a "bogus forum of peace with the real aim of sabotaging national defence" and said there would be a "reasonable limit" on foreign delegates. Among those excluded by the government were Frédéric Joliot-Curie, Ilya Ehrenburg, Alexander Fadeyev, and Dmitri Shostakovich. The number of delegates at Sheffield was reduced from an anticipated 2,000 to 500, half of whom were British.

=== 1950s ===
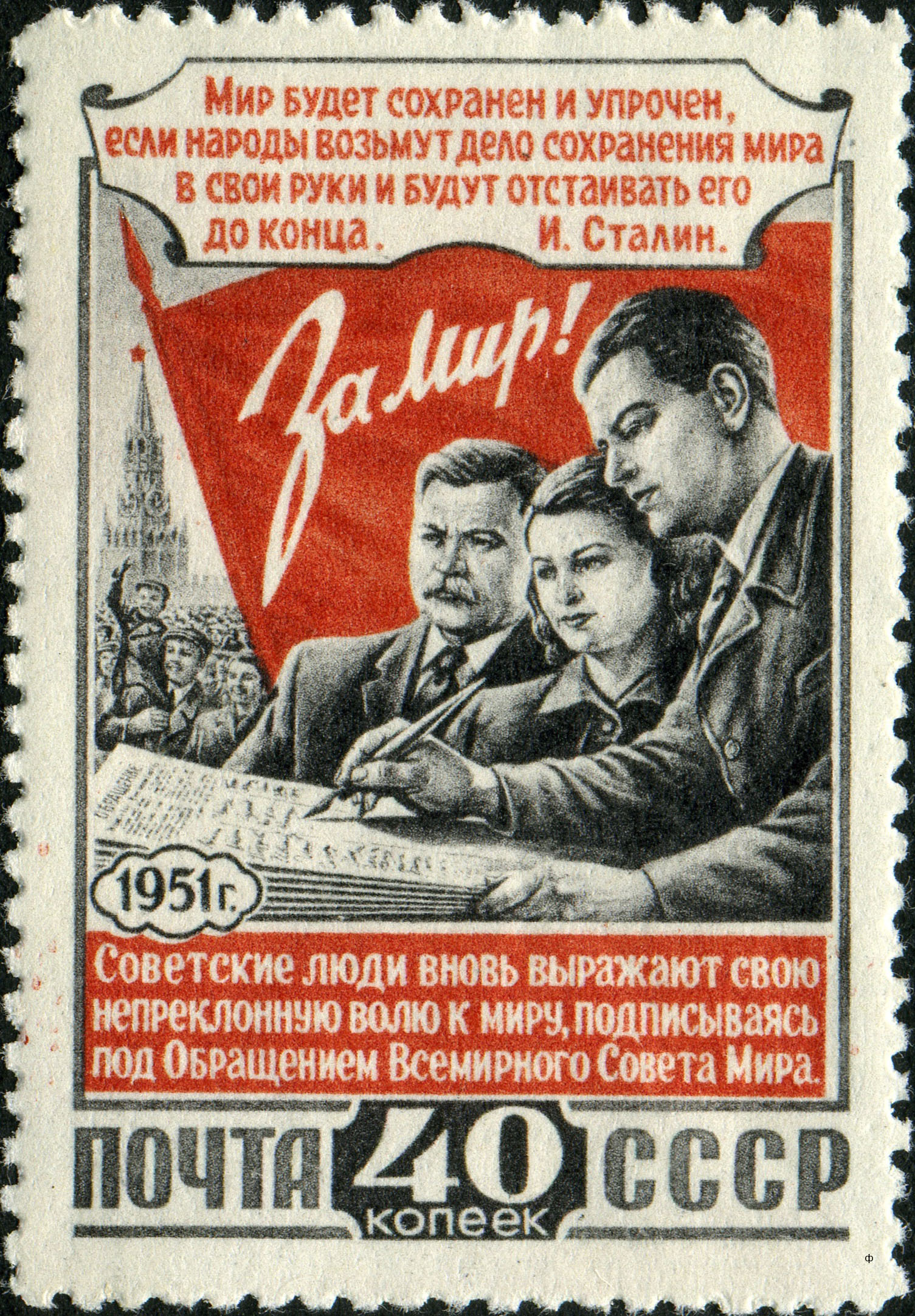
1951 Soviet stamp with Stalin's quote, marking the 3rd All-Union Conference of Peace Champions, signing a World Peace Council appeal

The WPC was directed by the International Department of the Central Committee of the Soviet Communist Party through the Soviet Peace Committee, although it tended not to present itself as an organ of Soviet foreign policy, but rather as the expression of the aspirations of the "peace loving peoples of the world".

In its early days the WPC attracted numerous "political and intellectual superstars", including W. E. B. Du Bois, Paul Robeson, Howard Fast, Pablo Picasso, Louis Aragon, Jorge Amado, Pablo Neruda, György Lukacs, Renato Guttuso, Jean-Paul Sartre, Diego Rivera, Muhammad al-Ashmar and Frédéric Joliot-Curie. Most were Communists or fellow travellers.

In the 1950s, congresses were held in Vienna, Berlin, Helsinki and Stockholm. The January 1952 World Congress of People in Vienna represented Joseph Stalin's strategy of peaceful coexistence, resulting in a more broad-based conference. Among those attending were Jean-Paul Sartre and Hervé Bazin. In 1955, another WPC meeting in Vienna launched an "Appeal against the Preparations for Nuclear War", with grandiose claims about its success.

Following the Soviet invasion of Hungary in 1956, the WPC convened a conference in Helsinki in December 1956. There were reportedly "serious differences" regarding the Hungarian situation within both the WPC and national peace movements. The conference passed a unanimous resolution blaming the conflict on "the cold war with its years of hate and distrust and its policy of blocs", and "the faults of an internal regime as well as their exploitation by foreign propagandists". The resolution also called for the withdrawal of Soviet troops and the restoration of Hungarian sovereignty.

The WPC led the international peace movement in the decade after the Second World War, but its failure to speak out against the Soviet suppression of the 1956 Hungarian uprising and the resumption of Soviet nuclear tests in 1961 marginalised it, and in the 1960s it was eclipsed by the newer, non-aligned peace organizations like the Campaign for Nuclear Disarmament. At first, Communists denounced the Campaign for Nuclear Disarmament for "splitting the peace movement" but they were compelled to join it when they saw how popular it was.

=== 1960s ===
Throughout much of the 1960s and early 1970s, the WPC campaigned against the US's role in the Vietnam War. Opposition to the Vietnam War was widespread in the mid-1960s and most of the anti-war activity had nothing to do with the WPC, which decided, under the leadership of J. D. Bernal, to take a softer line with non-aligned peace groups in order to secure their co-operation. In particular, Bernal believed that the WPC's influence with these groups was jeopardized by China's insistence that the WPC give unequivocal support to North Vietnam in the war.

In 1968, the Warsaw Pact invasion of Czechoslovakia occasioned unprecedented dissent from Soviet policy within the WPC. It brought about such a crisis in the Secretariat that in September that year only one delegate supported the invasion. However, the Soviet Union soon reasserted control, and according to the US State Department, "The WPC's eighth world assembly in East Berlin in June 1969 was widely criticized by various participants for its lack of spontaneity and carefully orchestrated Soviet supervision. As the British General Secretary of the International Confederation for Disarmament and Peace and a delegate to the 1969 assembly wrote (Tribune, 4 July 1969): 'There were a number [of delegates] who decided to vote against the general resolution for three reasons (a) it was platitudinous (b) it was one sided and (c) in protest against restrictions on minorities and the press within the assembly. This proved impossible in the end for no vote was taken.'"

=== Activities ===
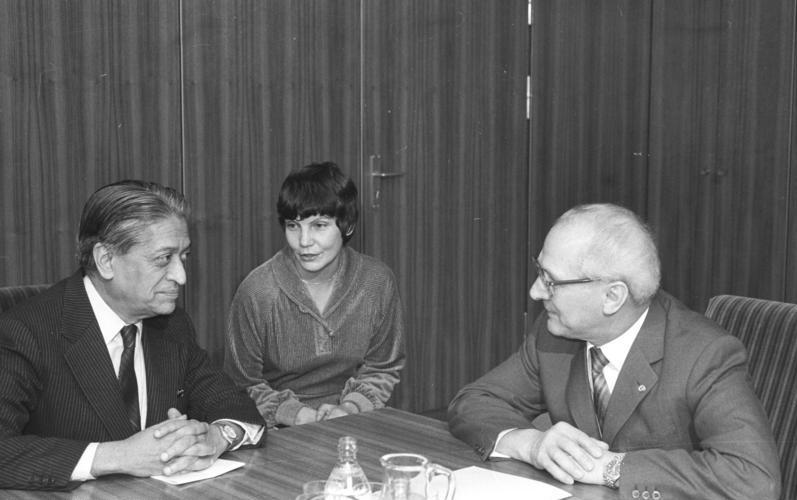
Romesh Chandra (left), President of the World Peace Council, with Erich Honecker, East German head of state, 1981

Until the late 1980s, the World Peace Council's principal activity was the organization of large international congresses, nearly all of which had over 2,000 delegates representing most of the countries of the world. Most of the delegates came from pro-Communist organizations, with some observers from non-aligned bodies. There were also meetings of the WPC Assembly, its highest governing body. The congresses and assemblies issued statements, appeals and resolutions that called for world peace in general terms and condemned US weapons policy, invasions and military actions. The US Department of State described the congresses as follows: "The majority of participants in the assemblies are Soviet and East European communist party members, representatives of foreign communist parties, and representatives of other Soviet-backed international fronts. Token noncommunist participation serves to lend an element of credibility. Discussion usually is confined to the inequities of Western socioeconomic systems and attacks on the military and foreign policies of the United States and other imperialist, fascist nations. Resolutions advocating policies favored by the U.S.S.R. and other communist nations are passed by acclamation, not by vote. In most cases, delegates do not see the texts until they are published in the communist media. Attempts by noncommunist delegates to discuss Soviet actions (such as the invasion of Afghanistan) are dismissed as interference in internal affairs or anti-Soviet propaganda. Dissent among delegates often is suppressed and never acknowledged in final resolutions or communiques. All assemblies praise the U.S.S.R. and other progressive societies and endorse Soviet foreign policy positions."

The WPC was involved in demonstrations and protests especially in areas bordering US military installations in Western Europe believed to house nuclear weapons. It campaigned against US-led military operations, especially the Vietnam War, although it did not condemn similar Soviet actions in Hungary and in Afghanistan.

On 18 March 1950, the WPC launched its Stockholm Appeal at a meeting of the Permanent Committee of the World Peace Congress, calling for the absolute prohibition of nuclear weapons. The campaign won popular support, collecting, it is said, 560 million signatures in Europe, most from socialist countries, including 10 million in France (including that of the young Jacques Chirac), and 155 million signatures in the Soviet Union – the entire adult population. Several non-aligned peace groups who had distanced themselves from the WPC advised their supporters not to sign the Appeal.

In June 1975 the WPC launched a second Stockholm Appeal during a period of détente between East and West. It declared that, "The victories of peace and détente have created a new international climate, new hopes, new confidence, new optimism among the peoples."

In the 1980s it campaigned against the deployment of U.S. missiles in Europe.

It published two magazines, New Perspectives and Peace Courier. Its current magazine is Peace Messenger.

=== Associated groups ===
In accordance with the Comniform's 1950 resolution to draw into the peace movement trade unions, women's and youth organisations, scientists, writers and journalists, etc., several Communist mass organisations supported the WPC, for example:

- Christian Peace Conference
- International Federation of Resistance Fighters
- International Institute for Peace
- International Association of Democratic Lawyers
- International Organization of Journalists
- International Union of Students
- World Federation of Democratic Youth
- World Federation of Scientific Workers
- World Federation of Trade Unions
- Women's International Democratic Federation

=== Relations with non-aligned peace groups ===
The WPC has been described as caught in contradictions as "it sought to become a broad world movement while being instrumentalized increasingly to serve foreign policy in the Soviet Union and nominally socialist countries." From the 1950s until the late 1980s it tried to use non-aligned peace organizations to spread the Soviet point of view, alternately wooing and attacking them, either for their pacifism or their refusal to support the Soviet Union. Until the early 1960s there was limited co-operation between such groups and the WPC, but they gradually dissociated themselves as they discovered it was impossible to criticize the Soviet Union at WPC conferences.

From the late 1940s to the late 1950s the WPC, with its large budget and high-profile conferences, dominated the peace movement, to the extent that the movement became identified with the Communist cause. The formation of the Campaign for Nuclear Disarmament in Britain in 1957 sparked a rapid growth in the unaligned peace movement and its detachment from the WPC. However, the public and some Western leaders still tended to regard all peace activists as Communists. For example, US President Ronald Reagan said that the big peace demonstrations in Europe in 1981 were "all sponsored by a thing called the World Peace Council, which is bought and paid for by the Soviet Union", and Soviet defector Vladimir Bukovsky claimed that they were co-ordinated at the WPC's 1980 World Parliament of Peoples for Peace in Sofia. The FBI reported to the United States House Permanent Select Committee on Intelligence that the WPC-affiliated U.S. Peace Council was one of the organizers of a large 1982 peace protest in New York City, but said that the KGB had not manipulated the American movement "significantly." International Physicians for the Prevention of Nuclear War was said to have had "overlapping membership and similar policies" to the WPC. and the Pugwash Conferences on Science and World Affairs and the Dartmouth Conferences were said to have been used by Soviet delegates to promote Soviet propaganda. Joseph Rotblat, one of the leaders of the Pugwash movement, said that although a few participants in Pugwash conferences from the Soviet Union "were obviously sent to push the party line ... the majority were genuine scientists and behaved as such".

As the non-aligned peace movement "was constantly under threat of being tarnished by association with avowedly pro-Soviet groups", many individuals and organizations "studiously avoided contact with Communists and fellow-travellers." Some western delegates walked out of the Wrocław conference of 1948, and in 1949 the World Pacifist Meeting warned against active collaboration with Communists. In the same year, several members of the British Peace Pledge Union, including Vera Brittain, Michael Tippett, and Sybil Morrison, criticised the WPC-affiliated British Peace Committee for what they saw as its "unquestioning hero-worship" of the Soviet Union. In 1950, several Swedish peace organizations warned their supporters against signing the WPC's Stockholm Appeal. In 1953, the International Liaison Committee of Organizations for Peace stated that it had "no association with the World Peace Council". In 1956, a year in which the WPC condemned the Suez war but not the Russian suppression of the 1956 Hungarian uprising, the German section of War Resisters International condemned it for its failure to respond to Soviet H-bomb tests. In Sweden, Aktionsgruppen Mot Svensk Atombomb discouraged its members from participating in Communist-led peace committees. The WPC attempted to co-opt the eminent peace campaigner Bertrand Russell, much to his annoyance, and in 1957 he refused the award of the WPC's International Peace Prize. In Britain, CND advised local groups in 1958 not to participate in a forthcoming WPC conference. In the US, SANE rejected WPC appeals for co-operation. A final break occurred during the WPC's 1962 World Congress for Peace and Disarmament in Moscow. The WPC had invited non-aligned peace groups, who were permitted to criticize Soviet nuclear testing, but when western activists including the British Committee of 100 tried to demonstrate in Red Square against Soviet weapons and the Communist system, their banners were confiscated and they were threatened with deportation. As a result of this confrontation, 40 non-aligned organizations decided to form a new international body, the International Confederation for Disarmament and Peace, which was not to have Soviet members.

From about 1982, following the proclamation of martial law in Poland, the Soviet Union adopted a harder line with non-aligned groups, apparently because their failure to prevent the deployment of Cruise and Pershing missiles. In December 1982, the Soviet Peace Committee President, Yuri Zhukov, returning to the rhetoric of the mid-1950s, wrote to several hundred non-communist peace groups in Western Europe accusing the Bertrand Russell Peace Foundation of "fueling the cold war by claiming that both NATO and the Warsaw Pact bear equal responsibility for the arms race and international tension. Zhukov denounced the West Berlin Working Group for a Nuclear-Free Europe, organizers of a May 1983 European disarmament conference in Berlin, for allegedly siding with NATO, attempting to split the peace movement, and distracting the peaceloving public from the main source of the deadly threat posed against the peoples of Europe-the plans for stationing a new generation of nuclear missiles in Europe in 1983." In 1983, the British peace campaigner E. P. Thompson, a leader of European Nuclear Disarmament, attended the World Peace Council's World Assembly for Peace and Life Against Nuclear War in Prague at the suggestion of the Czech dissident group Charter 77 and raised the issue of democracy and civil liberties in the Communist states, only for Assembly to respond by loudly applauding a delegate who said that "the so-called dissident issue was not a matter for the international peace movement, but something that had been injected into it artificially by anti-communists." The Hungarian student peace group, Dialogue, also tried to attend the 1983 Assembly but were met with tear gas, arrests, and deportation to Hungary; the following year the authorities banned it.

Rainer Santi, in his history of the International Peace Bureau, said that the WPC "always had difficulty in securing cooperation from West European and North American peace organisations because of its obvious affiliation with Socialist countries and the foreign policy of the Soviet Union. Especially difficult to digest, was that instead of criticising the Soviet Union's unilaterally resumed atmospheric nuclear testing in 1961, the WPC issued a statement rationalizing it. In 1979 the World Peace Council explained the Soviet invasion of Afghanistan as an act of solidarity in the face of Chinese and US aggression against Afghanistan." Rob Prince, a former secretary of the WPC, suggested that it simply failed to connect with the western peace movement because it used most of its funds on international travel and lavish conferences. It had poor intelligence on Western peace groups, and, even though its HQ was in Helsinki, had no contact with Finnish peace organizations.

=== After the demise of the Soviet Union ===
By the mid-1980s the Soviet Peace Committee "concluded that the WPC was a politically expendable and spent force", although it continued to provide funds until 1991. As the Soviet Peace Committee was the conduit for Soviet direction of the WPC, this judgement represented a downgrading of the WPC by the Soviet Communist Party. Under Mikhail Gorbachev, the Soviet Peace Committee developed bilateral international contacts "in which the WPC not only played no role, but was a liability." Gorbachev never even met WPC President Romesh Chandra and excluded him from many Moscow international forums. Following the 1991 breakup of the Soviet Union, the WPC lost most of its support, income and staff and dwindled to a small core group. Its international conferences now attract only a tenth of the delegates that its Soviet-backed conferences could attract (see below), although it still issues statements couched in similar terms to those of its historic appeals.

=== Location ===
The WPC first set up its offices in Paris, but was accused by the French government of engaging in "fifth column" activities and was expelled in 1952. It moved to Prague and then to Vienna. In 1957 it was banned by the Austrian government. It was invited to Prague but did not move there, had no official HQ but continued to operate in Vienna under cover of the International Institute for Peace. In 1968 it re-assumed its name and moved to Helsinki, Finland, where it remained until 1999. In 2000 it re-located to Athens, Greece.

=== Funding ===
The WPC was receiving financial contributions from friendly countries and from the Soviet Peace Committee during its history until 1991. After the year 2000 and the shifting of the Head office to Athens, its current finances derive exclusively from Membership Fees and contributions/donations by members and friends, based on the rules and regulations adopted in 2008, during the 19th Assembly of the WPC held in Caracas/Venezuela. The executive committee and Assemblies receive financial reports on income and expenses.

=== CIA measures against the WPC ===
The Congress for Cultural Freedom was founded in 1950 with the support of the CIA to counter the propaganda of the emerging WPC, and Phillip Agee claimed that the WPC was a Soviet front for propaganda which CIA covertly tried to neutralize and to prevent the WPC from organizing outside the Communist bloc.

== Current organisation ==
The WPC currently states its goals as: Actions against imperialist wars and occupation of sovereign countries and nations; prohibition of all weapons of mass destruction; abolition of foreign military bases; universal disarmament under effective international control; elimination of all forms of colonialism, neo-colonialism, racism, sexism and other forms of discrimination; respect for the right of peoples to sovereignty and independence, essential for the establishment of peace; non-interference in the internal affairs of nations; peaceful co-existence between states with different political systems; negotiations instead of use of force in the settlement of differences between nations.

The WPC is a registered NGO at the United Nations and co-operates primarily with the Non-Aligned Movement. It cooperates with United Nations Educational, Scientific and Cultural Organization (UNESCO), United Nations Conference on Trade and Development (UNCTAD), United Nations Industrial Development Organization (UNIDO), International Labour Organization (ILO), and other UN specialized agencies, special committees and departments. It is said to have successfully influenced their agendas, the terms of discussion and the orientations of their resolutions. It also cooperates with the African Union, the League of Arab States, and other inter-governmental bodies.

=== Leadership ===
- President: Pallab Sengupta, All India Peace and Solidarity Organisation (AIPSO)
- General Secretary: Thanasis Pafilis, Greek Committee for International Détente and Peace (EEDYE)
- Executive Secretary: Iraklis Tsavdaridis, Greek Committee for International Détente and Peace (EEDYE)

=== Secretariat ===
The members of the Secretariat of the WPC are:

- All India Peace and Solidarity Organization (AIPSO)
- Brazilian Center for Solidarity with the People and the Struggle for Peace (CEBRAPAZ)
- Greek Committee for International Détente and Peace (EEDYE)
- South African Peace Initiative (SAPI)
- Sudan Peace and Solidarity Council (SuPSC)
- Cuban Institute for the Friendship of the Peoples (ICAP)
- US Peace Council (USPC)
- Japan Peace Committee
- Portuguese Council for Peace and Cooperation (CPPC)
- Palestinian Committee for Peace and Solidarity (PCPS)
- Nepal Peace and Solidarity Council (NPSC)
- Cyprus Peace Council (CyPC)
- Syrian National Peace Council (SNPC)

=== Peace prizes ===
The WPC awards several peace prizes, some of which, it has been said, were awarded to politicians who funded the organization.

== Congresses and assemblies ==
The highest WPC body, the Assembly, meets every three years.

=== WPC Assemblies ===
- The World Congress of Intellectuals for Peace held in Wrocław on 6 August 1948 established the International Committee of Intellectuals in Defense of Peace.
- The World Congress of Partisans for Peace held on 20 April 1949 Paris & Prague established a World Committee of Partisans for Peace, which is considered the founding Congress of the WPC
  1. Paris & Prague, April 1949
  2. Warsaw, November 1950
  3. Vienna, December 1952
  4. Helsinki, June 1955
  5. Stockholm, July 1958
  6. Moscow, July 1962
  7. Helsinki, July 1965
  8. East Berlin, June 1969
  9. Budapest, May 1971
  10. Moscow, October 1973
  11. Warsaw, May 1977
  12. Sofia, September 1980
  13. Prague, June 1983
  14. Sofia, April 1986
  15. Athens, May 1990
  16. Mexico City, October 1996
  17. Athens, May 2000
  18. Athens, May 2004
  19. Caracas, April 2008
  20. Kathmandu, July 2012
  21. São Luís, November 2016
  22. Hanoi, November 2022

== Presidents ==
- (France) Frédéric Joliot-Curie (1950–58)
- (Republic of Ireland) John Desmond Bernal (1959–65)
- (Belgium) Isabelle Blume (1965–69)
- (India) Romesh Chandra (General Secretary in 1966–1977; President in 1977–90)
- (Greece) Evangelos Maheras (1990–93)
- (South Africa) Albertina Sisulu (1993–2002)
- (India) Niranjan Singh Maan (General Secretary)
- (Cuba) Orlando Fundora López (2002–08)
- (Brazil) Maria do Socorro Gomes Coelho (2008–2022)
- (India) Pallab Sengupta (2022-)

=== Secretaries-General ===
- 1949–1956: Jean Laffitte
- 1966–1977: Romesh Chandra
- 1979-1985: Tair Tairov
- 1986–1989: Johannes Pakaslahti

== Current members ==
Under its current rules, WPC members are national and international organizations that agree with its main principles and any of its objectives and pay membership fees. Other organizations may join at the discretion of the executive committee or become associate members. Distinguished individuals may become honorary members at the discretion of the executive committee.

As of March 2014, the WPC lists the following organizations among its "members and friends".

=== Current Communist States ===
- Chinese Association for Peace and Disarmament
- Cuban Movement for Peace and Sovereignty of the Peoples
- Lao Peace and Solidarity Committee
- Korean National Peace Committee (North Korea)
- Vietnam Peace Committee

=== Former Soviet Union ===
- Armenian Peace Committee
- Belarus Peace Committee
- Georgian Peace Committee
- Ukraine Anti-Fascist Committee
- Latvian Peace Committee
- International Federation for Peace and Conciliation (the former Soviet Peace Committee a federation of a number of organizations in the CIS). Its member organizations, at the time of its founding in 1992, included:
  - Armenian Committee for Peace and Conciliation
  - National Peace Committee of Republic of Azerbaijan
  - Public Association Belarusian Peace Committee
  - Peace Committee of the Republic of Georgia
  - Public Association Council for Peace and Conciliation of the Republic of Kazakhstan
  - Public Association Council for Peace and Conciliation of the Kyrgyz Republic
  - Latvian movement for peace
  - Lithuanian Peace Forum
  - Public Association "Аlliance for Peace of the Republic of Moldova"
  - Russian Peace Committee
  - Republican Public Association Peace Committee of the Republic of Tajikistan
  - Peace Fund of Turkmenistan
  - Ukrainian Peace Council

=== Former Eastern bloc ===
- Bulgarian National Peace Council
- Czech Peace Movement
- Hungarian Peace Committee
- Mongolia Union for Peace and Friendship

=== Europe ===
- Austrian Peace Council
- Vrede (Belgium)
- Croatia Anti-Fascist Committee
- Cyprus Peace Council
- Danish Peace Council
- Finnish Peace Committee
- Mouvement de la Paix (France)
- German Peace Council
- Greek Committee for International Detente and Peace
- Ireland Peace and Neutrality Alliance
- Forum against War (Italy)
- Peace Committee of Luxembourg
- Malta Peace Council
- Netherlands Hague Platform
- Portuguese Council for Peace and Cooperation
- Belgrade Forum for a World of Equals (Serbia)
- Swedish Peace Committee
- Swiss Peace Movement
- Peace Committee of Turkey

=== Asia ===
- Bangladesh Peace Council
- Bhutan Peace Council
- Burmese Peace Committee
- Cambodian Peace Committee
- All India Peace and Solidarity Organisation
- Association for the Defense of Peace, Solidarity and Democracy (Iran)
- Peace Committee of Israel
- Lebanese Peace Committee
- Japan Peace Committee
- Nepal Peace and Solidarity Council
- Pakistan Peace and Solidarity Council
- Palestinian Committee for Peace and Solidarity
- Philippines Peace and Solidarity Council
- Peace and Solidarity Organisation of Sri Lanka
- Sri Lanka Peace and Solidarity Council
- Syrian National Peace Council
- Timor-Leste Conselho da Paz
- Yemen Peace Committee

=== Africa ===
- Angolan League for the Friendship of the Peoples
- Congo Peace Committee (Democratic Republic of the Congo)
- Egyptian Peace Committee
- Ethiopian Peace Committee
- Peace Council of Mozambique
- Peace Committee of Madagascar
- Peace Committee of Namibia
- Nigerian Peace Committee
- South African Peace Initiative
- Sudan Peace and Solidarity Council
- Tunisian Peace Committee
- Zimbabwe Peace Committee

=== Americas ===
- Movimento por la Paz, Soberania y Solidaridad (Argentina)
- Caribbean Movement for Peace and Integration (Barbadoes)
- Comite Boliviano por la Paz, Tupaj Amaru
- Brazilian Center for Solidarity with the Peoples and Struggle for Peace
- Canadian Peace Congress
- Peace Committee of Chile
- Colombian Peace Committee
- Costa Rican National Peace Council
- Dominican Union Journalists for Peace
- Ecuador Peace and Independence Movement
- Movimento Mexicano por la Paz y el Desarollo
- Comite de Paz de Nicaragua
- Comite Nacional de Defensa de Solidaridad y Paz (Panama)
- Comite de Paz de Paraguay
- Comite Peruano por la Paz
- Movimento Salvadoreno por la Paz
- U.S. Peace Council
- Uruguay Grupo Historia y Memoria
- Comite de Solidaridad Internacional (Venezuela)

=== Oceania ===
- Australian Peace Council
- New Zealand Peace Council

=== Other ===
- International Action for Liberation
- European Peace Forum

== See also ==
- List of anti-war organizations
- List of peace activists
- Active measures
- Soviet influence on the peace movement
- International Confederation for Disarmament and Peace
- Communist propaganda
- Front organization
- National Council of Arts, Sciences and Professions
- Peace movement
- World peace
- World union for peace and fundamental human rights and the rights of peoples
