= Perin Chandra =

Indian communist writer and peace activist

- Born: 2 October 1918; Chaman, Balochistan, British India
- Died: 7 January 2015 (aged 96); Mumbai, India
- Occupations: Veteran Communist, Indian Freedom Fighter, Peace Activist, Author
- Notable work: The Fire Worshippers

Perin Bharucha Chandra (2 October 1918, – 7 January 2015) was an Indian author, communist, freedom fighter and peace activist. She played an integral role in promoting peace and peaceful conflict resolution throughout the Cold War era. She was born in Chaman, Balochistan (which used to be part of British India, but is now Pakistan) to a Parsi family. Her father was Lt. Colonel Phiroze Byramji Bharucha, a British Indian Army Doctor and later Surgeon General of Lahore. A believer in Scientific Socialism, she married (and later divorced) Romesh Chandra, a former chairman of the World Peace Council. Her son, Pheroze, is a journalist and her daughter-in-law, Chandita Mukherjee is a documentary filmmaker and activist.

== Early life and education ==
Perin Bharucha was born on 2 October 1918 in Chaman, Balochistan in present-day Pakistan.

She graduated before her wedding, adhering to a common belief prevalent among people in Punjab of having equal education among couples, at Kinnaird College and later Lahore University. It was during her Kinnaird College days that she got involved in India's struggle for freedom. She was known to be an organizer, peace activist and aid relief worker, who quickly formed a large group of members working out of a one-room house rented in Lahore. She helped to raise funds, provide relief and create awareness during the various natural calamities like the Bengal Famine travelling around the then undivided Punjab. It is said that she, together with Sheila Bhatia, led many sorties in the farming hinterland of Punjab. Perin Chandra became the first female General Secretary of the All India Students Federation (AISF).

An excerpt from Mainstream Weekly article as follows:

As a student leader Perin was very stern and known to be a hard taskmaster. She did not hesitate to severely reprimand those who wasted time gossiping in the coffee house. When she was told that a ditty on her was doing the rounds of which the opening lines were – "Coffee House men Perin aye, Dilo Jan ki baren aye ..."

== Post independence ==
She was a close associate of many stalwarts like senior Communist leader Ajoy Ghosh, the 12th Prime Minister of India I.K.Gujral, the former Home Minister of India Indrajit Gupta, and Romesh Chandra, former General Secretary and President of World Peace Council to name a few. Perin led the All India Peace and Solidarity Organization (AIPSO) and was at the helm of all affairs working out of the New Delhi office.

== Selected works ==
During her time at AIPSO, she also wrote many books, some of which are yet to be electronically published. Her first notable work as an author was in 1968 with the publishing of The Fire Worshippers, first published by the Strand Book Club, Bombay in 1968. The novel focuses on the customs of the Parsi community and covers problems of inter-caste marriage in the community. She was the first Parsi novelist to highlight the contentious issue of inter-faith marriage. The book also describes the Parsi ethnicity and how, in a rapidly changing India, the Parsi community is experiencing a decline in its population, or rather becoming assimilated into the greater society of the country.

In Bharucha's novel, The Fire Worshippers, the author challenges the concept of ethical purity through the character of Nariman, an idealist who wants to marry outside his family. Nariman's father, Pestonji Kanchawalla resists the idea, proposing a mixed marriage with Portia Roy, a non-Parsi girl. The book provides an interesting snapshot of the Parsi class structure in post-independence Bombay.

As Novy Kapadia states in the book Perspectives on the Novels of Rohinton Mistry:

"Perin was quite clairvoyant. In the 1960s, the trend of mixed marriages amongst Parsis was a trickle but as the author subtly hints, it could become a deluge. Within the space of three decades, the trend of inter-faith marriages has increased rapidly amongst the Parsi community. So in the novel, we find Pestonji objecting to his son's marriage because he felt he would become a trend-setter."

== Death ==
Her death was mourned by wider society and across the world by various leaders and communists. She is survived by Romesh Chandra (now deceased) and her children Shobha and Feroze. She died on 7 January 2015 following a prolonged illness at the age of 96. Her body was donated to Grant Medical College, Mumbai as per her last wish. Grant Medical College is where her father had studied medical science.
