= IOJ =

IOJ may refer to:

- International Organization of Journalists
- Islami Oikya Jote
