= Hronek =

Hronek (feminine: Hronková) is a Czech surname. Notable people include:

- Filip Hronek (born 1997), Czech ice hockey player
- Jiří Hronek (1905–1987), Czech writer
- Petr Hronek (born 1993), Czech footballer
- Tim Hronek (born 1995), German freestyle skier
- Veronique Hronek (born 1991), German alpine skier
