= Don Rojas =

Saint Vincent and the Grenadines journalist (born 1949)

Don Rojas (born 1949) is a journalist and political commentator from Saint Vincent and the Grenadines. He was Editor in Chief of Grenada's national newspaper, The Free West Indian. He was also a close associate of Prime Minister Maurice Bishop and served as his press secretary from 1981 to 1983 in the People's Revolutionary Government (PRG) of Grenada.

In September-October 1983, a power-sharing dispute between Bishop and Deputy Prime Minister Bernard Coard led to Bishop's arrest and execution. On 25 October 1983, the United States invaded Grenada and ousted the PRG. Four days after the invasion, Rojas and his family were deported by a U.S. Air Force plane to Barbados. They were only allowed to remain in Barbados for a few days, and then went on to Trinidad and later to Canada.

in the mid-1980s, Rojas was an executive at the International Organization of Journalists (IOJ) in Prague. In the early 1990s, he settled in the United States. He was Executive Editor of the New York Amsterdam News, a Black-owned weekly newspaper based in Harlem. He was the first Director of Communications of the NAACP. In July 1996, he founded the news and opinion website, The Black World Today, and served as its CEO.

In late 2002, Rojas was hired as General Manager of Pacifica Radio station WBAI in New York City where he stayed until May 2005. In 2006, he became a press officer for Oxfam America. In 2007, he worked for the Louisiana Disaster Recovery Foundation (later renamed the Foundation for Louisiana), an organization that was established in the aftermath of Hurricane Katrina to award money to nonprofits assisting the state's residents.

In 2013, Rojas briefly served as Executive Director of Free Speech TV. He then became Director of Communications and International Relations for the Institute of the Black World 21st Century (IBW21) and the originator of the Black World Media Network (BWMN).
