= International Federation of Resistance Fighters – Association of Anti-Fascists =

Anti-Axis resistance veterans organization

International Federation of Resistance Fighters (FIR)
- Fédération Internationale des Résistantes - Association des Antifascistes
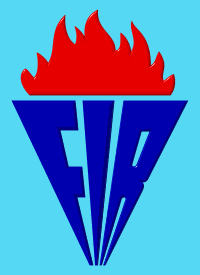
- Founded: 1951; Vienna, Austria
- Type: Non-governmental organization
- Purpose: Anti-fascism
- Location: Berlin
- Region served: Europe
- Method: campaigning
- Official language: English, German, French
- Key people: Vilmos Hanti, President, Ulrich Schneider, Secretary General
- Website: www.fir.at

The International Federation of Resistance Fighters – Association of Anti-Fascists also known by its French initials FIR (Fédération Internationale des Résistantes - Association des Antifascistes) is an organization of veterans of the anti-Axis resistance fighters, partisans, members of the anti-Hitler coalition. During the Cold War, it was a communist dominated organization that furthered the policies of the Eastern Bloc.

== History ==
The FIR was founded in June 1951 in Vienna. It was formed by an earlier organization called the International Federation of Former Political Prisoners; the latter organization had been founded in Paris in 1947. (Other sources say 1946).

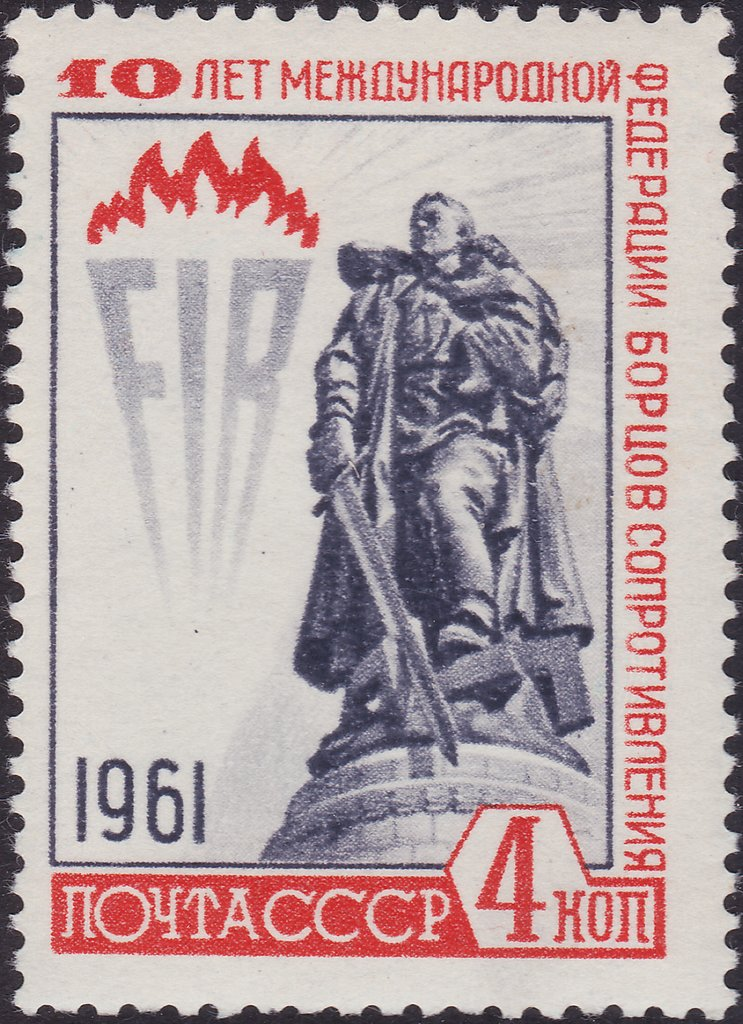
1961 USSR stamp marking the 10th anniversary of the FIR

Due to various activities and initiatives for disarmament and international cooperation, the Secretary General of the United Nations, on 15 September 1987, designated FIR as “Peace Messenger”. FIR is also the only antifascist organization officially accredited at the EU Transparency Register.

At the Prague-conference in 2016 the FIR awarded the Dutch anti-fascist Max van den Berg with their Michiel van der Borcht-prize for his life-long achievements.

== Organization ==
=== General Assemblies ===
- Vienna, June 1951
- Vienna, November 1954
- Vienna, November 1958 (first session); March 1959 (second session)
- Warsaw, December 1962
- Budapest, December 1965
- Athens, October 19 – 20, 2007
- Berlin, January 9 – 10, 2010
- Sofia, Bulgaria October 4 – 6, 2013
- Prague, Czech Republic November 18 – 20, 2016
- Reggio Emilia, Italy November 29–30, 2019

== Members ==
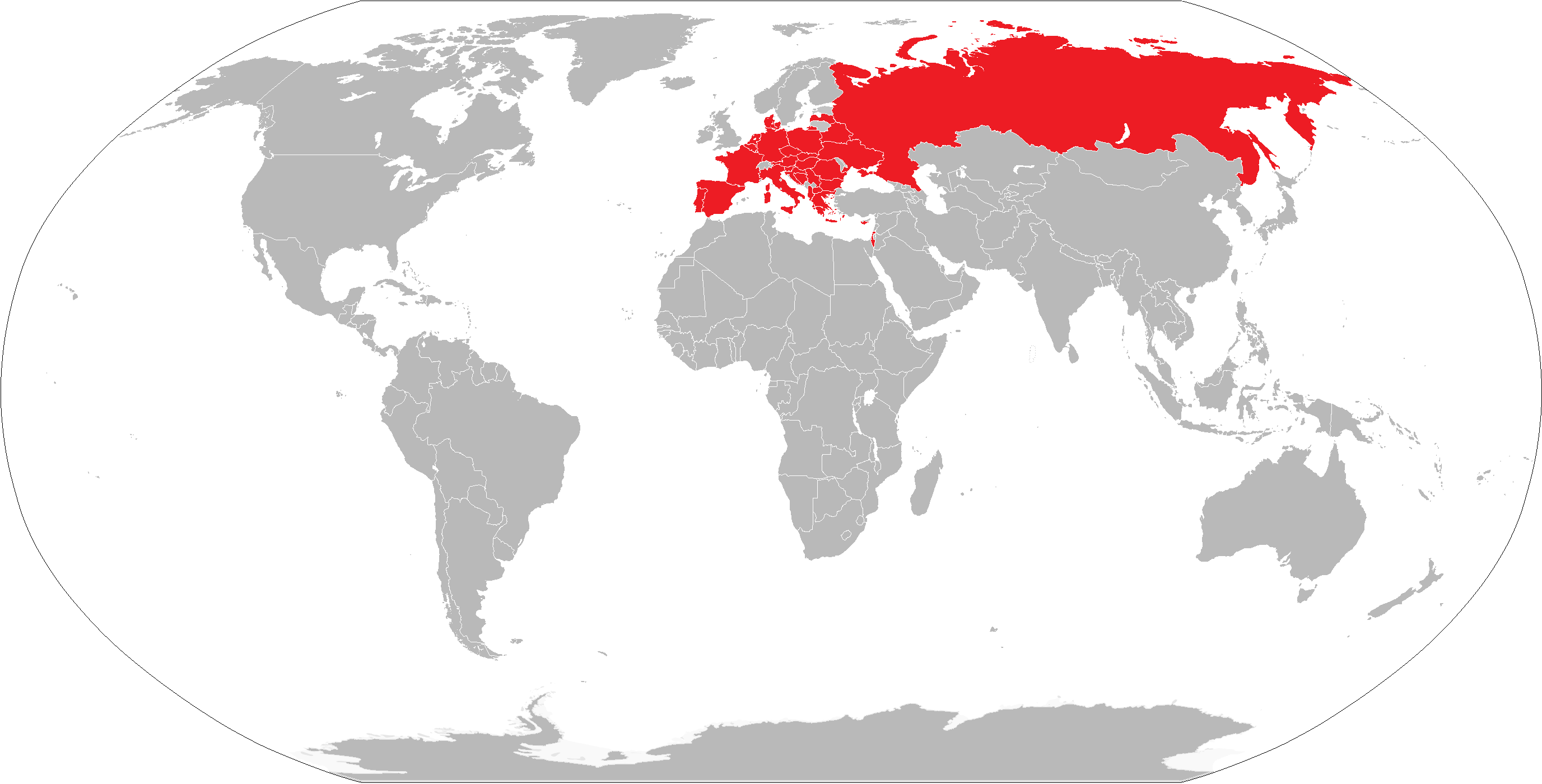
Red countries have at least one member of the FIR

- Albania - Veteranët e Luftës Antifashiste Nacionalçlirimtare Shqiptare
- Austria - Vereinigung österreichischer Freiwilliger in der spanischen Republik
- Austria - Bundesverband österreichischer Widerstandskämpfer und Antifaschisten
- Belarus - Veterans Organisation of the Republic of Belarus
- Belgium - Comité d'Action de la Résistance – Aktie Raad van de Weerstand
- Bosnia-Herzegovina - Udruženje veterana Narodnooslobodilačkog i antifašističkog rata Bosne i Hercegovine (1941–1945)
- Bulgaria - БЪЛГАРСКИ АНТИФАШИСТКИ СЪЮЗ / Union Antifasciste Bulgarie
- Croatia - Savez Antifasistisckih Boraca i Antifasista Republike Hrvatske
- Cyprus - Cyprus Veterans Association World War II / Σύνδεσμος Βετεράνων Κύπρου Παγκόσμιος Πόλεμος
- Cyprus - Pancyprian Democratic Resistance Association / Παγκύπρια Ένωση Δημοκρατικής Αντίστασης
- Czech Republic - Svaz bojovníků za svobodu/Verband der Freiheitskämpfer
- Denmark - FIR Danmark/FIR Denmark
- France - Association Nationale des Cheminots Anciens Combattants
- France - Union des Juifs pour la Résistance et l'Ent'aide
- France - Association Nationale des Anciens Combattants de la Résistance
- France - Comité International de Ravensbrück
- France - Amicale des Anciens Guerrilleros Espanols en France
- France - Comite Internationale Sachsenhausen
- Germany - Verband Deutscher in der Resistance, in den Streikräften der Antihilterkoalition
- Germany - Internationales Sachsenhausen Komitee
- Germany - Lagergemeinschaft Ravensbrück/ Freundeskreise
- Germany - Förderverein Gedenkstätte Steinwache / Internationales Rombergpark Komitee
- Germany - Kämpfer und Freunde der Spanischen Republik 1936–1939
- Germany - Vereinigung der Verfolgten des Naziregimes – Bund der Antifaschisten
- Germany - Arbeitsgemeinschaft Neuengamme
- Germany - Jenischer Bund in Deutschland
- Greece - Panellínia Énosi Agonistón tis Ethnikís Antístasis / Union Panhellénique des Combattants de la Résistance Nationale
- Greece - Panellínia énosi machitón tis Mésis Anatolís / Panhelleic ligue of Middle East-Fighters
- Greece - Orgánosi gia tin katapolémisi tis máchis tis ethnikís prostasías / Organisation Panhellénique des Combattants de la Résistance Nationale
- Greece - Panellínia Énosi Syndikalistón tis Ethnikís Antístasis / Ligue Panhellénique des Combattants de la Résistance Nationale
- Greece - Panellínia Politistikí Etaireía Apogónous kai Fíloi tou Ethnikoú Anthektikoú kai Dimokratikoú Stratoú / Panhellenic Cultural Society Descendants and Friends of National Resistant and Democratic Army
- Greece - Panellínia Omospondía Antistasiakón Organóseon / Panhellenic Federation of Resistance Organisations
- Hungary - Magyar Ellenállók és Antifasiszták Szövetsége / Verband der ungarischen Widerstandskämpfer und Antifaschisten- Gemeinsam für Demokratie
- Israel - Association of Disabled Veterans of Fight against Nazism
- Israel - Organization of Partisans Underground Fighters and Ghetto Rebels in Israel
- Israel - Veterans Union of World War II – Fighters Against Nazism
- Italy - Associazione Nazionale Partigiani d'Italia
- Italy - Associazione Partigiani Matteotti del Piemonte
- Latvia - Latvijas Tirailieru un partizānu 130. korpusa veterānu asociācija / Assoc. des Anciens Combattants du 130e Corps d’Armée de Tirailleurs Lettons et des Partisans
- Luxembourg - Les Amis des Brigades Internationales Luxembourg
- Luxembourg - Comite International de Sachsenhausen
- North Macedonia - Sojuz na veterani od nacionalnata osloboditelna i antifašistička vojna na Makedonija 1941 - 1945 godina / Union of Veterans from the national liberation and antifascist war of Macedonia 1941 – 1945
- Netherlands - Vereniging Landlijk Kontakt-Groep Verzetsgepensioneerden (40–45)
- Netherlands - Antifascistische oud-Verzetsstrijders Nederland / Bond van Antifascisten
- Poland - Polski Zwiazek Bylych Wiezniów Politycznych Hitlerowskich Wiezién I Obozów Koncentracyjnych
- Portugal - União de Resistentes Antifascistas Portugueses
- Romania - Asociatia Antifascistilor din Romania
- Russia - Rossiyskiy obshchestvennyy komitet byvshikh voinov / Russisches gesellschaftliches Komitee der ehemaligen Kriegsteilnehmer
- Russia - International Association of Veterans Organizations
- Serbia - Saveza udruženja boraca narodnooslobodilackog rata Srbije 1941-1945
- Slovakia - Slovenský zväz protifašistických bojovníkov
- Slovenia - Zvezo združenj borcev za vrednote NOB
- Spain - Amicale de Mauthausen y otros campos
- Spain - Associación Brigadas Internationales (Voluntarios de la Libertad)
- Spain - Associación de Ex-Presos y Represaliados Politicos Antifranquistas
- Spain - Associacio Catalana d'Expresos Politics
- Ukraine - All-Ukrainian Union of War Veterans

== FIR Bulletin ==
FIR monthly publishes a magazine named “FIR Bulletin” in three languages. The magazine focuses on historical-political issues; it contributes to notify events related to the European and International resistance.

== See also ==
- World Veterans Federation
- World Federation of Trade Unions
- Women's International Democratic Federation
- World Federation of Democratic Youth
- International Union of Students
- International Organization of Journalists
- International Association of Democratic Lawyers
- World Federation of Scientific Workers
- World Peace Council
- Veterans of the Abraham Lincoln Brigade
