= All India Peace and Solidarity Organisation =

Indian organization devoted to peace, solidarity and friendship

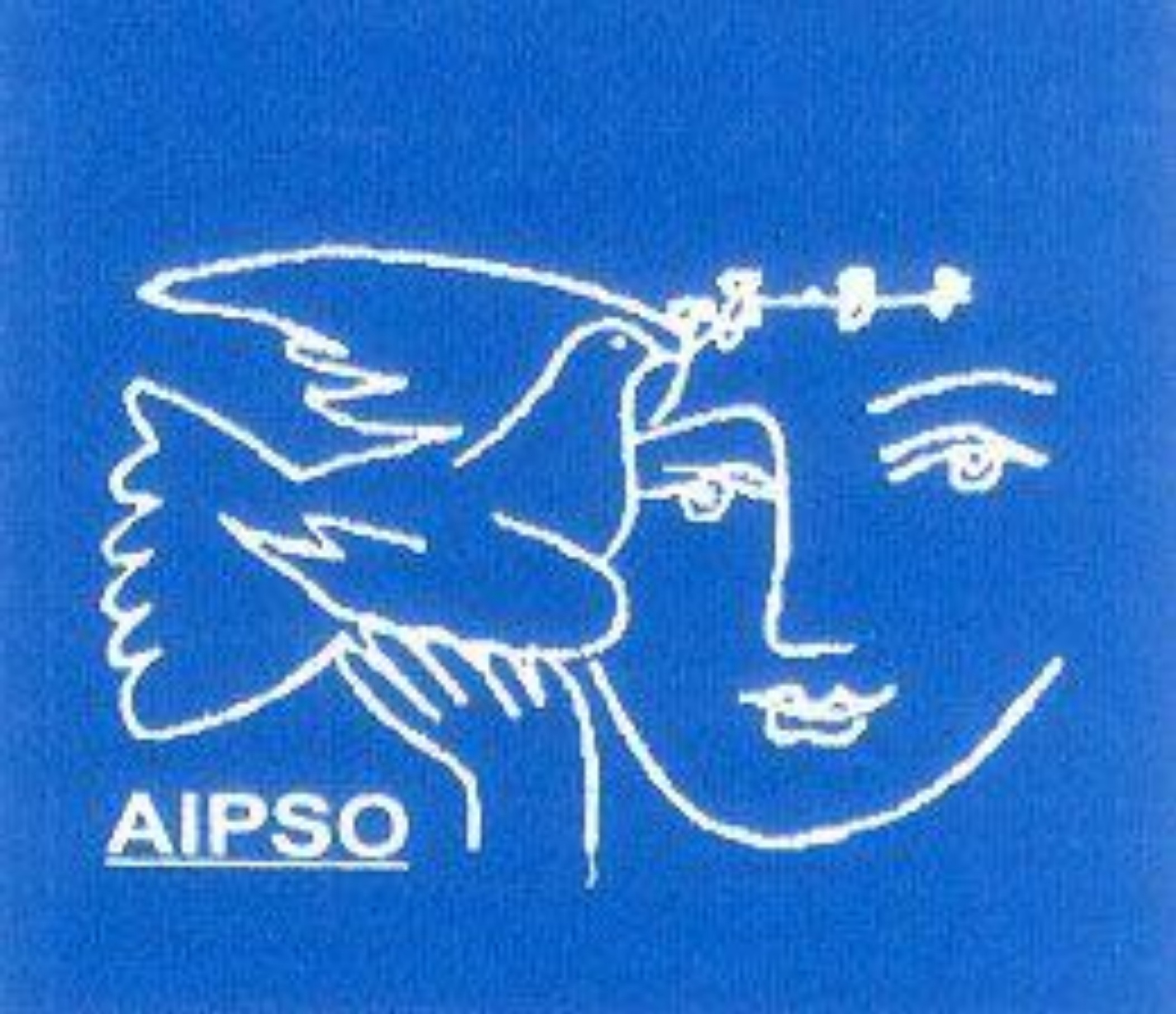
- Abbreviation: AIPSO
- Formation: 1951 (75 years ago)
- Headquarters: Munshi Niketan, Flat No. 16, 2nd Floor 1/10B Asaf Ali Road, New Delhi 110002, India
- Location: India
- General Secretary: Harchand Singh bhatt
- Affiliations: World Peace Council
- Website: www.aipso.org; wpc-in.org/aipso; aipsowb.org

The All India Peace and Solidarity Organisation (AIPSO) is an Indian nonprofit organization founded in 1951 which is a member of the World Peace Council. As of 2025, Nilotpal Basu asm Pallab Sengupta are members of the presidium of AIPSO and R. Arun Kumar is serving as one of the general secretaries.

Among the 1951 founders of AIPSO were, according to the organization, "Dr. Saifuddin Kitchlew, veteran Congress leader and freedom fighter, Pandit Sundarlal, disciple of Mahatma Gandhi, Dr M M Atal, leader of the Indian Medical Mission to China, Ajoy Ghosh, freedom fighter and Communist leader, A K Gopalan, freedom fighter and Communist leader, T B Cunha, leader of Goa, Prof. D D Kosambi, as also celebrated film personalities like Prithviraj Kapoor and Balraj Sahni, noted writers Krishan Chander, Rajendra Singh Bedi, renowned poets Vallathol, S. Gurbaksh Singh, and many other leading personalities".

In late 1964 AIPSO launched a fundraising campaign to help set up an office of the African National Congress in India. In September 1964 Yusuf Dadoo and J. B. Marks conducted a six-week speaking tour across India as part of the fundraising campaign, bringing accounts from the anti-Apartheid struggle to the Indian public. Over 40,000 INR was collected. At the time is had been 'the biggest sustained campaign undertaken on any single anti-imperialist issue in India'. The ANC office in New Delhi was inaugurated in 1967, with recognition from the Indian government. In 1969 it was re-baptised as the Asian Mission of the ANC. AIPSO also voiced support for MPLA in Angola.

AIPSO campaigned actively against U.S. intervention in Vietnam. In December 1974 AIPSO sent its first delegation to the Democratic Republic of Vietnam. The delegation, consisting of AIPSO general secretary Romesh Chandra, Vayalar Ravi (Member of Parliament) and Subrata Banerjee (Assistant Editor of The Economic Times), was received by Prime Minister Phạm Văn Đồng.

Together with the CPI, AIPSO campaign for support to the Saur Revolution in Afghanistan.

In the period of communal violence surrounding the 1992 Demolition of the Babri Masjid AIPSO organized peace marches and meetings to campaign for communal harmony. On 30 January 1993 it organized a conference on the death anniversary of Mahatma Gandhi, gathering Hindu, Muslim and Christian religious leaders.
