= Comite de Solidaridad Internacional =

Non-governmental organization

The International Solidarity Committee (Spanish: es:Comité de Solidaridad Internacional, COSI) was established as an NGO in Venezuela in 1971 by international activists on issues of peace and international solidarity. It is an organizational member of the Executive Committee of the World Peace Council (WPC).

COSI foundation was founded in 1971, as a coordinator of a Latin American and Caribbean integration unit, having as its main objectives:

- promote and teach respect for human rights
- encourage the study and evaluation of the aspects of economic, social, political, legal and military information that affect the maintenance and development of an environment of peace, cooperation, friendship and harmony among peoples
- Rescue and reaffirm the principles of international solidarity
- Promote the Bolivarian ideas about the common destiny of peoples
- Actively participate in the process of popular integration
- Fostering cultural exchange between peoples

The honorary president of COSI is Yolanda Soruco; the President is Carlos Lazo and the General Secretary is Yul Jabour
