= The Black World Today =

The Black World Today was a news and opinion website founded in July 1996 by Don Rojas (former press secretary to Grenada Prime Minister Maurice Bishop). Herb Boyd served as National Editor. The website’s mission was to "chronicle the daily social, political, cultural and economic realities of Black communities and countries." Although the website is now defunct, its affiliated Internet radio network Black World Radio, which was also started by Rojas, has remained active as part of Black World Media Network.

The Black World Today (TBWT) had numerous regular contributors, including Conrad Worrill (National Black United Front), Ron Daniels (Center for Constitutional Rights), Ron Walters (University of Maryland, College Park), Earl Ofari Hutchinson (New America Media), Bill Fletcher Jr. (TransAfrica and International Labor Rights Forum), Hugh Price (National Urban League), Manning Marable (Columbia University), and Kevin Powell (Cultural Activist).

TBWT was not aligned with any specific political parties but supported agendas that were striving for universal peace. It advocated that black people should invest in new technologies to increase progress in a knowledge-based global economy, in the belief that the mass medium of the Internet could be a means for further empowerment in the U.S. and around the world.

== Resources ==
- TBWT Official Website
- Herb Boyd's Official Website
- Alkalimat, Abdul (December 20, 2003). The African American Experience In Cyberspace: A Resource Guide to the Best Web Sites on Black Culture and History. Pluto Press. ISBN 978-0-7453-2222-3.
