= Yuri Zhukov (politician) =

Soviet journalist, publicist, and political figure

- Юрий Жуков
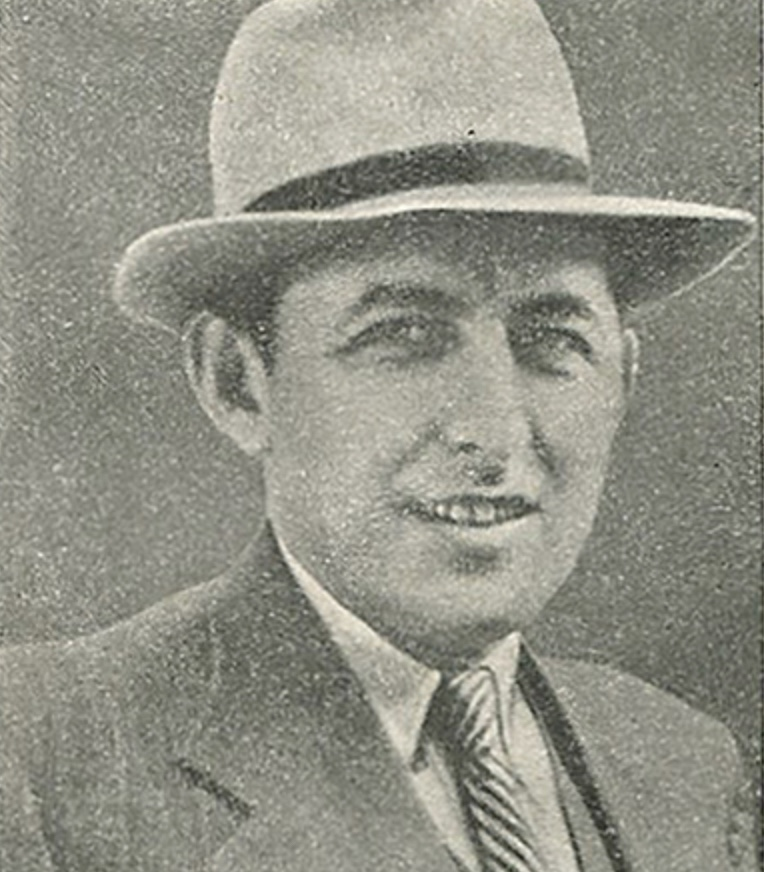
- Zhukov in 1947
- Born: Georgy Aleksandrovich Zhukov; 23 April 1908; Almazna, Russian Empire
- Died: May 31, 1991 (aged 83); Moscow
- Resting place: Troyekurovskoye Cemetery
- Education: Moscow Lomonosov Automobile and Tractor Institute
- Occupations: Journalist, publicist, politician
- Employer: Pravda
- Title: Honoured Cultural Worker of the RSFSR
- Political party: CPSU
- Awards: Hero of Socialist Labour; Order of Lenin; Order of the October Revolution; Order of the Patriotic War; Order of the Red Banner of Labour; Order of Friendship of Peoples; Order of the Red Star; Lenin Prize

Yuri Zhukov (Russian: Юрий Жуков), born Georgy Aleksandrovich Zhukov (Russian: Георгий Александрович Жуков; 23 April 1908, Almazna – 31 May 1991, Moscow) was a Soviet journalist, publicist and political figure.

== Biography ==
Born at the Almaznaya station, then part of the Slavyanoserbsk uezd, Yekaterinoslav Governorate in the Russian Empire, in the family of a clergyman (later a teacher). Georgy, as a child, when the difficult events of 1914-1920 began, was sent by his father to his brother Mikhail Zhukov in Tiflis, who loved his nephew as his own son and helped him improve his French.

In 1925 he became an employee of the wall newspaper of the Lugansk railway vocational school "Red Puteyets". From 1926 he worked as an assistant driver in the Lugansk branch of the Donetsk Railway. From 1927 he was a worker correspondent of the enamel plant, then a correspondent, literary employee, head of the department of the newspapers "Luganskaya Pravda", "Komsomolets Ukrainy".

In 1932 he graduated from the Moscow Lomonosov Automobile and Tractor Institute, then worked as a design engineer at the Gorky Automobile Plant. From 1932 he worked for the newspaper Komsomolskaya Pravda (literary employee, department head). In 1938-1940 he was a correspondent for the magazine Nasha Strana. In 1940-1941 he was department head for the magazine Novy Mir. In 1941-1945 he served as a war correspondent, head of the front department. In 1946, following the end of the war, he became member of the editorial board of Komsomolskaya Pravda.

In 1957-1962 he served as the chairman of the powerful State Committee for Cultural Relations with Foreign Countries, an organ that took sizable portion of responsibilities from the Soviet Foreign Ministry from 1957 to 1967. Zhukov would oversee preparations and signing of the first agreement on cultural exchanges with the United States (Lacy-Zarubin act, signed in January 1958) and the Soviet national exhibition in New York in summer 1959. He also hosted Vice President Richard Nixon on an unofficial visit to the Soviet Union July 23 - August 2, 1959 to open the American National Exhibition in Sokolniki Park in Moscow.

Since 1962 he was political observer for the newspaper Pravda. In 1960, together with other journalists (Nikolai Gribachev, L. F. Ilyichev and others), he wrote the book Face to Face with America — about Nikita Khrushchev's trip to the USA. They were awarded the Lenin Prize for this book.

Since 1972 he was host of the author's television program on the Programme One of Soviet Central Television, "Political observer of the newspaper Pravda Yuri Zhukov answers viewers' questions."

Zhukov was a member of the Communist Party of the Soviet Union. Around 1938-1945 he toured Dalkrai and wrote books on the Soviet Far East and Japan.

Later, he sat on the editorial board of Soviet daily Pravda (1946–1987); he was also a columnist of the paper. Zhukov served as the newspaper's Paris correspondent in 1948–1952. From 1952 to 1957 he was the Deputy Editor-in-Chief of the newspaper.

In the late 1950s he was a speechwriter for Soviet leader Nikita Khrushchev.

Deputy Chairman of the Soviet Peace Committee (1962–1982) and Chairman (1982–1987).

He was a candidate member of the Central Committee of the Communist Party of the Soviet Union.
