= Soviet Peace Committee =

Soviet peace organization

The Soviet Peace Committee (SPC, also known as Soviet Committee for the Defense of Peace, SCDP, Russian: Советский Комитет Защиты Мира) was a state-sponsored organization responsible for coordinating peace movements active in the Soviet Union. It was founded in 1949 and existed until the fall of the Soviet Union in 1991.

== History and activities ==
The Soviet Peace Committee was founded in August 1949. It was a member of the World Peace Council (an organization that was also founded in 1949). The inaugural meeting was called the First All-Union Conference of the Partisans of Peace or the all-Soviet Peace Conference.

The Soviet Peace Committee supported anti-war campaigns against the wars or militarization of the non-communist, Western countries, but failed to condemn similar actions originating from the USSR or its allies. For example, in 1962 during a World Peace Council conference in Moscow, the Committee strongly objected to criticism of Soviet resumption of nuclear testing and threatened with deportation non-aligned activists who wanted to distribute leaflets. In the early 1980s, it criticized the European Nuclear Disarmament (END) for its portrayal of the Soviet Union on the same level as NATO and the United States, arguing that while NATO deployment of nuclear missiles in Europe was "an aggressive policy", the Soviet Union had the right to deploy such weapons defensively. Some even saw the Committee as a front for the KGB.

Independent peace movements in the USSR which operated without permission of the Committee were seen as suspect.

It gained some independence during the liberalization of the Soviet Union (perestroika) in 1985–1991. In the last years of its existence, in the early 1990s, the organization's official publication, Vek XX i Mir (20th Century and Peace), previously seen as a "reliable propaganda instrument", addressed issues controversial in the USSR, such as the death penalty, liberalism, human rights, totalitarianism and the Katyn Massacre.

The Soviet Peace Committee ceased to exist with the fall of the Soviet Union in 1991. In 1992, remnants of the Soviet Peace Committee were reorganized into the Federation for Peace and Conciliation.

== Chairmen ==
Soviet Peace Committee had four chairmen:

- Nikolay Semenovich Tikhonov (1949–1979)
- Yevgeny Konstantinovich Fyodorov (1979–1981)
- Yury Zhukov (1982–1987)
- Genrikh Borovik (1987–1991)

== See also ==
- List of anti-war organizations
