= Institute of the Black World 21st Century =

Education organization in New York City, US

The Institute of the Black World 21st Century (IBW) (IBW21) is a resource center and database engine developing and strengthening the empowerment of black communities and organizations using collaborative, cooperative strategies and methods. The mission of the Institute of the Black World 21st Century is to elevate Black communities in the U.S. and internationally to achieve economic, social-cultural and political stakehold and help push for a better quality of life.
