= International Association of Democratic Lawyers =

Left-wing jurists' association

International Association of Democratic Lawyers (IADL) is an international organization of left-wing and progressive jurists' associations with sections and members in 50 countries and territories. Along with facilitating contact and exchange of views between and among lawyers and lawyers' associations of all countries, the IADL works to conduct research on legal issues affecting human, political and economic rights, organizes international commissions of enquiry and conferences on legal and judicial concerns, and takes part in international legal observer missions. Through its activities the Association works as a recognized consultative organization with the United Nations through ECOSOC, UNESCO and UNICEF.

== History ==
The Association was founded in Paris in 1946 by leftist French lawyers with connections to the French resistance. Many of its founders served as prosecutors at the Nuremberg trials. Its first president was René Cassin, who was largely responsible for writing the Universal Declaration of Human Rights.

The IADL stated that it had documented proof of the US dropping poisoned mosquitoes on North Koreans and mass-torturing civilians during the Korean War. Cassin resigned his presidency in 1951 due to the resulting U.S. pressure, and the US successfully lobbied France to expel the headquarters of what it considered a communist front from Paris. The Central Intelligence Agency started funding the International Commission of Jurists to counter the IADL.

From 1967 the IADL was one of the original NGOs accredited with Consultative II Status with ECOSOC and is represented at UNESCO and UNICEF. The Association is also a member of the Conference of NGOs (CONGO) of the United Nations.

In 1990, the Soviet Union funded the organization with 100,000 US dollars.

== Headquarters ==
Its international headquarters are located at Rue Brialmont 21, B-1210, Brussels, Belgium.

Its international Secretariat is located at Ito Building, 2nd Floor, Yotsuya 1–2, Shinjuku-ku, 160–0004, Tokyo, Japan.

== Organization ==
The IADL is organized on the basis of institutional member organizations, regional and affiliated sections, groups and individual membership, representing about 200,000 members in all.

Institutional Members:

- Bangladesh – Democratic Lawyers Association of Bangladesh (DLAB)
- Belgium – Progress Lawyers Network As of 2010 it has offices in Antwerp and Brussels.
- Bulgaria – Union of Jurists in Bulgaria
- Cuba – Unión Nacional de Juristas de Cuba
- Finland – Suomen Demokraattiset Lakimiehet (Oikeuspoliittinen yhdistys Demla)
- France – Droit Solidarité
- Germany (West) – Vereinigung Demokratischer Juristen Deutschlands
- Italy – Giuristi Democratici
- India – All India Lawyers Union
- India – Indian Association of Lawyers
- Japan – Japanese Lawyers International Solidarity Association (JALISA)
- Morocco – Association Marocaine des Droits Humains
- North Korea – Korean Democratic Lawyers Organisation
- Philippines – The National Union of Peoples' Lawyers (NUPL)
- United Kingdom – Haldane Society of Socialist Lawyers
- United States – National Lawyers Guild

Regional and Affiliated Members:

- Arab Lawyers Union
- American Association of Jurists
- Palestinian Centre for Human Rights
- European Association of Lawyers for Democracy and World Human Rights
- European Lawyers for Democracy and Human Rights
- European Democratic Lawyers. Its member organizations are:
  - Belgium – Le Syndicat des Avocats pour la Démocratie (S.A D.)
  - France – Le Syndicat des Avocats de France (S.A.F.)
  - Germany – Der Republikanische Anwältinnen und Anwälteverein (RAV)
  - Italy – La Confederazione Nazionale Delle Associazioni Sindicali Forensi d 'Italia
  - Italy – L'Iniziativa Democratica Forense (I.D.F.)
  - Italy – Legal Team Italia ( L.T.I.)
  - Netherlands – De Vereniging Sociale Advokatuur Nederland (VSAN)
  - Spain – L 'Associació Catalana per a la Defensa dels Drets Humans (A.C.D.D.H)
  - Spain – La Asociación Libre de Abogados (ALA)
  - Spain – Euskal Herriko Abokatuen Elkartea (ESKUBIDEAK)

== Activities ==
- IADL sent a team to investigate allegations of biological warfare in the Korean War in 1951, and published "Report on U.S. Crimes in Korea", alleging the United States has used biological weapons during Korean War.
- In 2006, IADL claimed that the United Nations Stabilisation Mission in Haiti was manipulated by the United States, and called for the release of members of leftist party Fanmi Lavalas.
- IADL filed an amicus curiae with the US Supreme Court in 2009 relating to the trial of five Cuban intelligence officers who were convicted in Miami of conspiracy to commit espionage and murder. The IADL stated that the large Cuban exile population in Miami "supports many political and paramilitary groups dedicated to the overthrow of the Castro government". As a result, the IADL believed that the defendants had not received "a fair trial by an impartial fact finder".
- IADL made statement saying they oppose the use of military force against Syria and Iran in 2012.

== Economic and Social Council consultative status ==
IADL applied for Category B consultative status with the UN Economic and Social Council in 1954, 1955, 1957 and 1959, but the application was rejected. The application was accepted in 1967.

The organizations are divided into three groups: those in Category A, which have a basic interest in most of the activities of the council; those in Category B, which have a special competence but are concerned with only a few of the council's activities; and those with a significant contribution to make to the council's work, which are placed on a Register for ad hoc consultations. At the end of 1967, there were 143 NGOs with Category B status.

== See also ==
- International Organization of Journalists
- International Union of Students
- Women's International Democratic Federation
- World Federation of Trade Unions
- World Federation of Democratic Youth
- World Federation of Scientific Workers
- World Peace Council
