= Jiří Hronek =

Czech journalist, playwright and novelist

- Born: 1 May 1905; Roudnice nad Labem, Austria-Hungary
- Died: 5 March 1987 (aged 81); Prague, Czechoslovakia

Jiří Hronek, born Jiří Langstein (1 May 1905 – 5 March 1987), was a Czechoslovak journalist, publicist, playwright and novelist.

== Biography ==
Born into a journalistic family, Hronek was the son of editor Isidor Langstein (1879–1942) and Růžena, née Picková (1881–1942). He had a younger sister, Věra (married as Pauknerová, 1910–1942). The family originally lived in Žižkov and from 1907 in Královské Vinohrady. During 1942, his parents and sister were arrested and deported, victims of the Holocaust. His sister was murdered in Auschwitz, his mother at Maly Trostenets, and his father in the Izbica Ghetto.

Starting in 1925 and until 1936, Hronek worked as a journalist. From 1936, he was editor at Central European Radio in Vienna. Following the annexation of Austria to Nazi Germany in March 1938, he relocated to Paris as correspondent of the publishing house Melantrich. After the occupation of France, he fled to London, where he worked at the Czechoslovak Ministry of Foreign Affairs from 1940 to 1945.

Following World War II, he returned to Czechoslovakia and worked in various positions. First at the Ministry of Information, where he was the editor-in-chief of Czechoslovak Radio and the editor-in-chief of the Czech News Agency in charge of managing the Pragopress agency.

In 1946, Hronek was part of the Czechoslovak delegation to the founding Congress of the International Organization of Journalists (IOJ) in Copenhagen. In 1947 he was elected secretary general of the IOJ, a position he served in until 1951.

He retired in 1970.
