= Romesh Chandra =

Indian politician

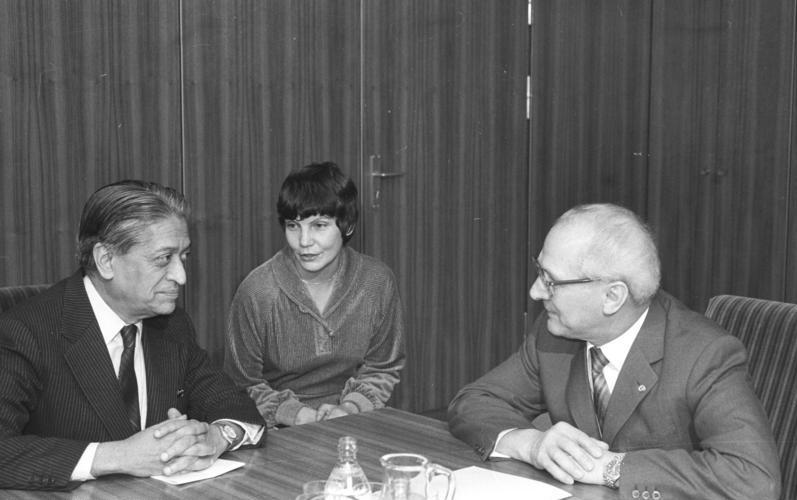
- Romesh Chandra (left) and German politician Erich Honecker (right)
- Born: 30 March 1919; Lyallpur, British India (now Faisalabad, Pakistan)
- Died: 4 July 2016 (aged 97); Mumbai, Maharashtra, India
- Known for: Indian Communist; President of the World Peace Council
- Political party: Communist Party of India

Romesh Chandra (30 March 1919 – 4 July 2016) was a leader of the Communist Party of India (CPI) and the president of the World Peace Council from 1977 to 1990. He joined the CPI in 1939 and took part in the Indian independence struggle as a student leader. He subsequently held various posts within the party.

== Life ==
Chandra was born on 30 March 1919 in Lyallpur in British India (now Faisalabad, Pakistan). He earned one degree in Lahore and another from Cambridge University in England.

In Lahore, Chandra was chairman of a students' union from 1934 to 1941. He joined the Communist Party of India in 1939, taking part in India's freedom struggle and became the member of the Central Committee of the CPI by 1952. Later he rose to the National Council in 1958 and entered the Central Executive Committee. He was member of the Central Secretariat of the National Council from 1963 to 1967. Chandra also edited the party publication New Age from 1963 to 1966.

Chandra became the General Secretary of the All-India Peace Council in 1952 and continued that position till 1963. In 1953 he joined the World Peace Council, becoming its General Secretary in 1953 and its president in 1977. He addressed the United Nations many times, the most times of any Indian. The World Peace Council gave Chandra its F. Joliot-Curie Gold Peace Medal in 1964. The Soviet Union in 1968 presented him with the International Lenin Prize for Strengthening Peace among Nations and again honoured him by conferring the Order of Friendship of Peoples in 1975. In 1971, he criticized the North Atlantic Treaty Organization as a "great threat to world peace". During the Assembly of the World Peace Council held at Athens in 2000, Chandra was elected as its "President of Honour".

Chandra was married and had a son, Firoze Chandra. The couple divorced, and his ex-wife Perin Chandra died in 2015. Around 3 p.m. IST on 4 July 2016, Chandra died in Mumbai of old age at the age of 97.
