= World union for peace and fundamental human rights and the rights of peoples =

The World union for peace and fundamental human rights and the rights of peoples (abbreviated UNIPAX) is a human rights non-governmental organization (NGO) based in Italy.

Since 1969 some Europeanists of the city of Bassano del Grappa, Province of Vicenza, began a series of initiatives that anticipated and prepared the foundation of UNIPAX, which seeks "to education to European Union, fundamental human rights and global community”.
