= International Confederation for Disarmament and Peace =

The International Confederation for Disarmament and Peace was an organisation formed by peace groups from western and non-aligned nations in 1963.

As a result of confrontation between western and Soviet delegates at the 1962 World Congress for Peace and Disarmament, which was organised by the USSR-backed World Peace Council, non-aligned peace organisations decided to form an international body that would be independent of the World Peace Council. The founding conference of this body was attended by delegates from forty organizations.

The founding organizations were:

- Accra Assembly Continuing Committee
- Aktionsgruppen Mot Svensk Atoombomb
- American Friends Service Committee
- Arbeitsgemeinschaft Deutscher Friendensverbande
- Campaign for Nuclear Disarmament (UK)
- Canadian Campaign for Nuclear Disarmament
- Colleges and Universities CND (UK)
- Combined CND Groups and New South Wales and Queensland Peace Committee
- Combined Universities Campaign (Canada)
- Comite 1962 voor de Vrede
- Committee of 100 (United Kingdom)
- Committee on Non-Violent Action
- Consulta della Pace
- European Federation Against Nuclear Arms
- Fellowship of Reconciliation and War Resisters (Belgium)
- Friends Peace Committee (UK)
- Gandhi Peace Foundation
- Greek Peace Committee
- International Fellowship of Reconciliation
- International Liaison Committee of Organizations for Peace
- Irish CND
- Kampagnen mod Atomvaben
- Kampanjen mot Atomvapen
- Komiteen for Oplysning om Atomfaren
- National Committee for a Sane Nuclear Policy
- National Peace Council (UK)
- New Zealand CND
- P.S.U (France)
- Peace Pledge Union
- Schweizerische Bewegung Gegen Die Altomare Anfrustung
- Society for Social Responsibility in Science
- Student Peace Union
- Turn Towards Peace
- Voice of Women (Canada)
- War Resisters International
- War Resisters League
- Women’s International League for Peace and Freedom
- Women Strike for Peace
- Yugoslav League for Peace Independence and Equality of Peoples.

It was merged with the International Peace Bureau in 1978.
