= U.S. Peace Council =

Peace organization

- President: Bahman Azad
- Website: uspeacecouncil.org

The U.S. Peace Council is a peace and disarmament activist organization founded in 1979. It is affiliated with the World Peace Council and represents its American section. Its current president as of 2025 is Bahman Azad.

== Backdrop ==
In the early 1980s, NATO's decision to deploy a new generation of strategic nuclear warheads in Europe and U.S. President Ronald Reagan's planned military buildup program signaled the end of detente, a return to heightened Cold War tensions, and renewed fears of nuclear war.

== FBI attention ==
The Peace Council of 1982 held three days of organizational meetings at Georgetown University in Washington, D.C., attended by approximately 275 to 300 people from thirty-three states, Great Britain, and the Soviet Union. They later were one of many groups that organized a June 1982 huge peace protest in New York City. Edward J. O'Malley, assistant FBI director of intelligence, charged that KGB officers were instructed "to devote serious attention to the antiwar movement in the United States," and were infiltrating it.

== Notable members ==
Over the years, leading members of the U.S. Peace Council have included:

- Barbara Lee, current mayor of Oakland and former member of the United States House of Representatives
- James E. Jackson (1914–2007), veteran civil rights leader.
- Gus Newport, former mayor of Berkeley, CA.
- Alice Palmer, former Illinois State Senator
- Leslie Cagan, coordinator of anti-war coalition United for Peace and Justice.

== See also ==
- World Peace Council
