= International Institute for Peace =

Austrian research group

The International Institute For Peace (IIP) was established in Vienna, Austria, in 1956 to conduct research on peace and promote the peaceful resolution of conflict. Operating globally alongside organizations like the Economic and Social Council of the United Nations (ECOSOC) and United Nations Organization for Education, Science, Culture and Communication (UNESCO), the IIP implements peaceful practices across nations.

== History ==
The International Institute for Peace was founded in Vienna in 1956. In 1989, Erwin Lanc re-founded the institute as a non-governmental organization and introduced new statutes. Since 1989, the IIP has been, according to Austrian Law, independent of the state. It has consultative status at the Economic and Social Council of the United Nations (ECOSOC) and the United Nations Organization for Education, Science, Culture, and Communication (UNESCO). The current president is Dr. Hannes Swoboda.

== About ==
The International Institute for Peace (IIP) is an international Non-Governmental Organization (NGO) with consultative status with UNESCO since 2011. IIP and UNESCO work together to address violence worldwide, mainly in high population areas. They analyze cases and attempt to find peaceful resolutions. IIP's work helps UNESCO meet its constitutional goal of peacebuilding.

IIP’s efforts include incorporating peace building practices into various aspects such as art and the environment; providing mediation efforts for those in stressful or violent situations; and building a global platform for creating peaceful societies. The organization collaborates with state governments, international organizations, businesses, and civil society organizations in various countries and specializes in politics, peace research, and conflict resolution. International outreaches in collaboration with other NGOs and IGOs are part of the action plan, specifically in Africa, North America, and South America. The institute also conducts research worldwide, including in Austria where it is based. Their findings examine the effectiveness of conflict resolutions on the economy and society.
