= Christian Peace Conference =

International organization founded by Josef Hromádka

The Christian Peace Conference (Czech: Křesťanská mírová konference) was an international organization based in Prague and founded in 1958 by Josef Hromádka, a pastor who had spent the war years in the United States, moving back to Czechoslovakia, when the war ended and Heinrich Vogel, an evangelical theologian. Hromádka was a member of the Bureau of the World Peace Council. He was not a Marxist, but the Christian Peace Conference often endorsed positions taken by Eastern bloc governments. It has been alleged to have received $210,000 from Soviet sources.

== See also ==
- List of anti-war organizations
