= International Organization of Journalists =

Soviet-era press organisation

Logotype of the IOJ

The International Organization of Journalists (IOJ, French: Organisation internationale des journalistes) was an international press workers' organization based in Prague, Czechoslovakia, during the Cold War. It was one of dozens of front organizations launched by the Soviet Union in the late 1940s and early 1950s. It was controlled in Prague by the Central Committee of the Czechoslovak Communist Party, with the assistance of KGB agents. It was described by the U.S. Central Intelligence Agency as "an instrumentality of Soviet propaganda".

== History ==
The International Organization of Journalists was formed at a congress held in Copenhagen in June 1946. At this meeting, the International Federation of Journalists and the International Federation of Journalists of the Allied and Free Countries merged into the new organization and for a time the new organization was broadly representative of the journalists of the world. However, by 1950 the IOJ had become dominated by communists and the non-communist member organizations had withdrawn. These would re-launch the International Federation of Journalists in 1952.

A declassified Central Intelligence Agency document from 1955, described the IOJ as "an instrumentality of Soviet propaganda". In a 2009 interview with the newspaper Helsingin Sanomat, the Finnish professor Kaarle Nordenstreng who was the chairman of the IOJ 1976–1990, acknowledged that they took orders from the Kremlin but maintained that their operations were far from straightforwardly following their directives.

== Organization ==
The decision-making body of the IOJ was Congress, which met every four years. Members of the IOJ, and delegations representing groups that had less than 20 members, had a voice, but no vote in the deliberation. Congress elected the Executive Committee, whose members could be nominated either by member federations or by the Congress itself. The Executive Committee met once a year. The IOJ Bureau was also elected by the Congress and consisted of the President, Secretary-General and a number of Vice-Presidents and met as required. Members of the Bureau were ex-officio members of the Executive Committee. The General Secretariat handled day-to-day administration of the IOJ and was headed by the General Secretary under the direction of the Bureau. Originally headquartered in London, in June 1947, the IOJ moved to Opletalova 5, Prague II, and in 1966, to Vinohradska 3, Prague 1, and by 1978, to Parizska 9, 11001 Prague 1.

=== Congresses ===
The IOJ held the following Congresses:

- Copenhagen, June 1946
- Prague, June 1947
- Helsinki, September 1950
- Bucharest, May 1956
- Budapest, August 1962
- East Berlin, October 1966
- Havana, January 1971

== Members ==
In October 1955 the International Organization of Journalists claimed to have 60,000 members in 51 countries: "national organizations" in 14 countries - Albania, Bulgaria, People's Republic of China, Czechoslovakia, Finland, France, German Democratic Republic, Hungary, Democratic People's Republic of Korea, Mongolia, Poland, Romania, Soviet Union and North Vietnam; "national groups" in Mexico and Ceylon. It apparently had individual members in 33 further countries.

In 1957, representatives of the French Journalists Union (an affiliated of the CGT), the Association of Polish Journalists, the All-China Journalists Association were mentioned as officers of the IOJ.

In 1970 it declared that it had 150,000 members.

In 1978 the following organizations were affiliated with IOJ:

- Algeria - Union of Algerian Journalists
- Argentina - Press Syndicate of Cordoba
- Argentina - Association of Journalists of Buenos Aires
- Bolivia - Democratic Union of Workers of the Bolivian Press
- Cameroon - National Union of Journalists (Cameroon)
- Colombia - National Collegium of Journalists
- Congo - National Union of Congolese Journalists
- Czechoslovakia - Czechoslovak Union of Journalists
- Dominican Republic - National Syndicate of Professional Journalists
- El Salvador - National Union of Journalists (El Salvador)
- Gambia - Gambia Journalists' Association
- Guyana - Union of Guyanese Journalists
- Japan - Japan Congress of Journalists
- Japan - Association of Japanese Journalists
- North Korea, Japan - Association of Korean Journalists and Publishers in Japan
- Madagascar - Press Syndicate of Madagascar
- Namibia - SWAPO, Journalists Branch
- Nicaragua - National Union of Journalists (Nicaragua)
- Palestine - General Union of Palestinian Writers and Journalists
- Peru - Federation of Journalists of Peru
- Romania - Council of Romanian Journalists
- South Africa - South African Journalists Union, African National Congress
- Syria - Syrian Journalists' Union
- Uruguay - Association of the Uruguayan Press
- South Yemen - Democratic Yemeni Journalists Organization
- Zimbabwe - Association of Journalists of Zimbabwe

In addition to these, there were also "organizations, committees, groups or individuals" who were members in the following states: Afghanistan, Albania, Angola, Australia, Austria, Bangladesh, Belgium, Benin, Brazil, Bulgaria, Burma, Kampuchea, Canada, Chile, Costa Rica, Cuba, Cyprus, Denmark, Ecuador, Egypt, Ethiopia, Finland, France, West Germany, East Germany, Ghana, Great Britain, Guinea, Guinea-Bissau, Honduras, Hong Kong, Hungary, India, Indonesia, Iran, Iraq, Italy, Ivory Coast, Jordan, Kenya, North Korea, Kuwait, Laos, Lebanon, Libya, Luxembourg, Malawi, Malaysia, Mali, Mauritania, Mauritius, Mexico, Mongolia, Morocco, Mozambique, Nepal, Netherlands, New Zealand, Nigeria, Norway, Pakistan, Panama, Paraguay, Poland, Puerto Rico, Senegal, Sierra Leone, Somalia, the USSR, Spain, Sri Lanka, Sudan, Sweden, Switzerland, Tanzania, Togo, Trindiad and Tobago, Tunisia, Turkey, Uganda, the United States, Venezuela, Vietnam and Zaire.

== Publications ==
The IOJ published a monthly The Democratic Journalist in English, French, Spanish, German and Russian. Other publications included Interpressgrafik, Journalists' affairs and Afrique mass media.

Kaarle Nordenstreng published 3 parts of Useful Recollections on the history of IOJ.

== Affiliated people ==
=== General Secretaries ===
1947: Jiří Hronek
1953: Jaroslav Knobloch
1959: Jiři Meisner
1966: Jiri Kubka
1988: Dusan Ulcak
1990: Gerard Gatinot
1995: Antonio Nieva

=== Presidents ===
1947: Archibald Kenyon
1950: Jean-Maurice Hermann
1976: Kaarle Nordenstreng
1990: Armando Rollemberg
Manuel Tomé
1995: Suleiman Al-Qudah

=== Other people ===
- Krassimir Ivandjiiski, Bulgarian journalist
- Marimuthu Pragalathan Naicker, South African journalist, communist and anti-apartheid activist
- Don Rojas, worked in the Prague office

== See also ==
- World Federation of Scientific Workers
- Committee to Protect Journalists
- Reporters Without Borders
- The Coalition For Women In Journalism
