= 2nd Congress of the Communist Party of India =

1948 party congress

The 2nd Congress of the Communist Party of India was held in Calcutta, West Bengal from 28 February to 6 March 1948. At the Second Party Congress, the party line shifted dramatically under the new General Secretary B.T. Ranadive and subsequently the party engaged in revolutionary insurrections across the country.

== Background ==
The party had seen a rapid growth in membership in the years preceding the Second Party Congress, reaching around 89,000. In 1935 there had been only around 1,000 CPI members, and by 1943 the number had increased to around 16,000.

Whilst the CPI constitution stipulated that an All India Party Conference be held yearly under normal conditions, the last one had been held in 1943. By the time the Second Party Congress finally convened, P.C. Joshi had served a 13-year term as Party General Secretary.

When the Second Party Congress convened, CPI stood at a crossroads. Either they would work within the constitutional framework of the newly independent Indian state or it would engage in insurrectional revolutionary struggles. The incumbent CPI General Secretary, P.C. Joshi, represented the former position, B.T. Ranadive (BTR) the latter. At the time of independence of India and Pakistan in 1947 CPI adhered to a moderate line of 'responsive cooperation' with the Indian National Congress and the Muslim League. But as of December 1947 the leftist group around BTR had won control over the Central Committee of the party. A key factor in the ascent of BTR and the defeat of the incumbent P. C. Joshi clique was post-Partition dissatisfaction with the past policy of alliance with the Muslim League. The group around BTR began to purge the followers of P.C. Joshi. The December meeting of the Central Committee sent out instruction to party branches to hastily elect delegates to the Second Party Congress.

== Delegates ==
919 delegates were elected by the party branches, but only 632 were able to attend. For example, only a handful of the 75 delegates elected from Telangana were able to reach Calcutta. Out of the 632, 565 were party whole-timers.

Three delegates represented party branches in West Pakistan: Eric Cyprian from Punjab, Jamaluddin Bokhari from Sind and Mohammad Hussein Ata from the North-West Frontier Province. Estimates on the number of delegates from East Pakistan vary, party documents suggested that 60 delegates participated, an intelligence estimate put the figure at 32. Delegates from East Pakistan included Kalpana Datta (P.C. Joshi's wife) and Khokar Roy. Moni Singh claimed that there had been 125 delegates from East Pakistan, representing 12,000 party members, as well as five delegates from West Pakistan.

From French India, the local Communist Party leader and member of the French Senate V. Subbiah participated in the Second Party Congress. On 24 February 1948 he had made a visit to the French colony of Chandernagore together with the French delegate to the Calcutta Youth Conference (see below).

== Proceedings ==
The congress was held under a big tarpaulin in Mohammad Ali Park. BTR held the opening speech of the conference, outlining the new party line. His speech lasted four and a half hours, and presented detailed criticism on the performance of the party leadership.

So far we have been taking a reformist path. We dovetailed with bourgeois interests. We could not take an independent stance in the movement on the issue of freedom. As a result, the reactionary forces of Congress and Muslim League through a forged alliance ushered in a so-called Independence. This is not real independence, it is false! Just as in a postwar situation, there is still grounds for revolution. That is why we must continue our struggle against the bourgeoisie. Strikes, mass rallies, demonstrations, and armed struggles must be used to challenge this false sense of freedom.

BTR echoed the notion that the world was divided in two camps, and in the struggle between the Anglo-American imperialist camp and the Soviet-led democratic camp the Indian state had aligned itself with the imperialists. The second speech was held by Bhowani Sen who presented an overview of tactical questions. Sen presented criticism of the performance of the party 1942–1948, including the support to Sheikh Abdullah's movement in Jammu and Kashmir. The Telangana struggle was presented as the model to be replicated throughout the subcontinent.

BTR and Bhowani's speeches were followed by a long presentation by the now isolated P.C. Joshi. P.C. Joshi expressed self-criticism, stating that he had 'confused and corrupted' the party during his tenure as General Secretary.

The main document debated by the Second Party Congress was its Political Thesis. Many amendments to the document were suggested by delegates, and the Central Committee was tasked with amending it later. The party constitution was amended at the Second Party Congress.

== CC election ==
BTR was elected as new General Secretary of the party. In the election to the new Central Committee all of the candidates proposed by the outgoing leadership were elected, with the exception of P.C. Joshi, who was left out of the new Central Committee.

== New party line ==
The line adopted at the Second Party Congress became popularly known as the 'Ranadive thesis', the 'Ranadive line' or 'Calcutta thesis'. The Second Party Congress raised the slogan that the independence achieved in 1947 was 'sham independence'. The Indian National Congress was denounced as a party of the bourgeoisie. The People's Democratic Revolution was outlined as a one-stage revolution, to be achieved through a united front of workers, peasants and revolutionary intellectuals. Thus the Second Party Congress implied a drastic shift in CPI policy, gearing towards armed insurrection against the nascent Indian state. The new line found inspiration in the Zhdanov Doctrine of the All-Union Communist Party (bolsheviks), which saw the world divided in an imperialist camp and a camp of people's democracies. It also drew upon the experiences of Bengali communists in the post-Partition chaos in Calcutta and the resistance against the Nizam regime in the Hyderabad State.

Another meeting held in the city around just a few days before the Second Party Congress was the Conference of Youth and Students of Southeast Asia Fighting for Freedom and Independence, which has been credited with disseminating the Zhdanov insurrectional line throughout the continent.

== Founding of the Communist Party of Pakistan ==
Bhowani Sen presented a 'Report on Pakistan' to the Second Party Congress. He argued that both India and Pakistan were dominated by similar reactionary elites in alliance with imperialist forces. Thus the task of communists in both countries would be the same, to struggle for people's democratic revolution. The Second Party Congress deliberated on the Pakistan question for some time, and eventually agreed that a separate Communist Party should be built in Pakistan. Sen's 'Report on Pakistan' was adopted with some amendments. After the vote the delegates from West Pakistan held a separate meeting at the sidelines of the CPI congress on 6 March 1948 and constituted the Communist Party of Pakistan. Sajjad Zaheer, founder of the All India Progressive Writers Association and a CPI Central Committee member, was named general secretary of the Communist Party of Pakistan. The other eight Central Committee members were Mohammad Hussain Ata, Jamaluddin Bokhari, Ibrahim (a labour leader), Khoka Roy, Nepal Nag, Krishna Binod Roy, Syed Abul Mansur Habibullah (from West Bengal, but moved to East Pakistan after the foundation of CPP) and Moni Singh.

After the congress Zaheer travelled to West Pakistan to build the party there. He was no longer considered a CPI Central Committee member.

Notably, the party structure in East Pakistan would remain under the supervision of the West Bengal committee of CPI for some time afterwards.

== Foreign delegations ==
Four foreign delegations attend the Second Party Congress: the League of Communists of Yugoslavia (Vladimir Dedijer and Radovan Zogović), the Communist Party of Australia (Lance Sharkey), the Communist Party of Burma (Thakin Than Tun, Thakin Ba Thein Tin, yebaw Aung Gyi, Bo Yan Aung, Khin Kyi and Hla Myaing) and the Communist Party of Ceylon.

Dedijer's speech detailed the struggle of Yugoslav Partisans and was met with heavy applause from the assembled delegates. Acting as de facto representatives of Cominform, the Yugoslav delegates provided important symbolic support to legitimize B.T. Ranadive's coming to power in the party. The Burmese communist leader Thakin Than Tun also aroused the revolutionary fervour in his speech, highlighting that armed struggle alone would provide a path towards liberation.

Along with the Asian Youth Conference, the CPI Calcutta Congress is credited to have influenced the Burmese communists to initiate armed rebellion at home. Nevertheless, Bertil Lintner argues that the impact of the Calcutta meetings on CPB line is a myth, and that H.N. Goshal (who is credited with the 'Goshal thesis' of armed insurrection in Burma) never attended neither of the two Calcutta conferences.

== Aftermath ==
Following the Second Party Congress and under the leadership of BTR, the party embarked on an 18-month campaign of armed uprisings in Telangana, West Bengal (Kakdwip), Tripura and Travancore-Cochin between October 1948 and March 1950. In Malabar, the party raised the slogan "Telangana's way is our way" and "Land to the tiller and Power to the People" in a campaign April–May 1948. Paddy crops were seized by the party and sold at fair prices. The Malabar revolt was crushed by police forces.

After the Second Party Congress CPI suffered a number of set-backs and repression, and party membership dropped to around 25,000 in early 1950. Likewise the membership of the communist-led All India Trade Union Congress dropped from 700,000 to a mere 100,000. On 26 March 1950 CPI was banned by the West Bengal state government. The West Bengal ban would later be followed by prohibitions of the party in Amritsar, Malabar (1949–1951), Madras, Manipur, Ahmednagar, Hyderabad, Travancore-Cochin, Indore and Bhopal. On 2 April 1948 S.A. Dange and other key party leaders in Bombay were jailed. By 1949 2,500 party members were imprisoned across the country.

In January 1950 the Cominform instructed the party to abandon the insurrectional line, through an article in its newspaper For a Lasting Peace, for a Peoples Democracy!. BTR was demoted in June 1950, denounced as a 'left adventurist' and replaced by C. Rajeshwar Rao as General Secretary. In April 1951 Ajoy Ghosh became the new General Secretary and the Chinese-inspired guerrilla warfare line was condemned by the new CPI leadership. The Telangana rebellion did however, in spite of Cominform instructions, continue until late 1951. In 1951 CPI contested the first parliamentary elections and emerged as the largest opposition party in the Lok Sabha.

The Madurai Party Congress, held in 1954, and the Palghat Party Congress of 1956 marked the definitive break with the 1948 line and fully embraced parliamentarian orientation of the party.
