= Aparajitha Raja =

Indian politician (born 1991)

- Education: JNU
- Political party: Communist Party Of India
- Parents: D. Raja (father); Annie Raja (mother)

Aparajitha Raja (born 24 January 1991) is an Indian politician who was the national leader of the All India Students’ Federation (AISF). She is currently serving as a National Council member of All India Youth Federation. She is the daughter of D. Raja, the Communist Party of India’s (CPI) General Secretary, and Annie Raja, the General Secretary of the National Federation of Indian Women.

Aparajitha studied Political Science at Hindu College in Delhi University, running for the presidency of the Delhi University Students Union in her second year. She later got a Masters in Philosophy at Jawaharlal Nehru University (JNU). She was the president of the JNU unit of the AISF. She was alleged by the Delhi Police to have been involved in a 2016 event on the JNU campus that saw the chanting of "anti-national" slogans while protesting the 2013 execution of Afzal Guru, a terrorist who was convicted for attacking the Indian Parliament in 2001. Aparajitha said that although she attended the event, she was not involved in these chants and called them "juvenile and senseless". However, she defended the right to chant these slogans without the threat of being charged for sedition. The Bengali poet Mandakranta Sen wrote a poem supporting Aparajitha on the issue, I Am Aparajitha.

Aparajitha ran for President of the JNU Students' Union in 2017, campaigning on the issues of seat cuts in the M.Phil and Ph.D programmes and promising to start discussion on the Kashmir conflict.
