= Sunil Mukherjee =

Indian politician

Sunil Mukherjee (16 November 1914 - 30 March 1992) was an Indian politician and leader of Communist Party of India. He was the founder secretary of Communist Party of India Bihar unit.

== Biography ==
=== Early life ===
He was born on 16 November 1914 in the town of Bhagalpur, Bihar and Orissa Province at his maternal uncle's house. His childhood was spent in Munger. His father Nirapada Mukherjee was a pleader, later settled down in Munger, becoming a workers’ and Congress leader. Sunil got admitted in 4th class in 1921-22.

Sunil's uncle Tarapada Mukherjee, who worked in post office and was a firm nationalist and anti-British, deeply influenced him. Tarapada resigned from his post and began to work in workers’ union. After his death Sunil's father Nirapada changed completely and joined the Congress after resigning his post. He decided to give everything to Congress and for freedom. He was arrested in 1930. Later he became parliamentary secretary and a minister in Congress governments and fought many elections, winning all.

Sunil's mother came from the family of Bankim Chandra Chatterjee, who was her uncle.

=== In Yugantar Party ===
Yugantar Party of Bengal had a group in Munger also, and located Sunil. Shyama Prasad Majumdar of Yugantar used to meet Sunil. It consisted of such people as Binod Behari Mukherjee, Anil Moitra, Gyan Vikash Moitra, Jwala Singh etc. Most of them were to become founders of CPI in Bihar. At the time they used to gather arms and ammunitions. They threw bomb on Munger police station; Sunil was with them. Majumdar supplied books and literature and they read about Russian and Irish revolutions. Sunil became a firm revolutionary and a member of Yugantar Party in 1929, when he was a student of Matric in Munger Zila School.

At the same time Sunil joined the Congress to escape arrest. He did several underground assignments for the Congress between 1930 and 1932. Illegal handbills and pamphlets were brought out from the underground press across the Ganges in north Munger from Gogri village. They used to run an Ashram also. In 1930 mother shifted to a small house after Nirapada Mukherjee was arrested. Yugantar assigned Sunil to acquire arms. There was a gun factory in Munger, where attempts were made to acquire some pistols, revolvers etc, to be sent to Calcutta.

=== In Congress session ===
Sunil Mukherjee attended the Congress session held in Delhi in 1932, in semi-legal conditions. Delegates and workers began to be arrested soon after arrival.

Sunil took 11 delegates to Delhi, with himself as delegate. They were instructed to reach Chandni Chowk at 9 am and begin reading the document. Thousands reached there and began to read the document. They were attacked with lathis and bayonets. A large number were injured. They were taken to Camp Jail outside the city and were kept interned there for two months.

After release Sunil reached Calcutta and took admission in Rippon School in Matriculation. His hostel room became the centre of revolutionary activities. He was arrested in the ‘Cornwallis Street Shooting Case’ in the early 30s. Dinesh Majumdar was hanged in the case. But Sunil got benefit of doubt and was released.

Anderson was the Bengal governor and Charles Tegart the police commissioner, a terror. Sunil was arrested from his uncle's house. He was badly beaten for days together, was put on ice slabs, nails were driven into his fingers and many other forms of tortures were applied on him. He was then shifted to Presidency jail and detained in a solitary cell.

There he met many prominent persons including the famous Gopal Haldar. They got engaged in political and ideological rethinking. They tried to understand Russian revolution, Bolshevik Party and Lenin. Abdul Halim and Muzaffar Ahmed contacted them.

=== In Communist Party of India ===
Sunil was kept in the same room as Bhupesh Gupta, the future CPI leader. They remained together for full four years, which was to prove decisive for Sunil's life. They studied Marx's Capital, Lenin's State and Revolution and other literature. This went on till mid-1934.

Sunil joined the ‘Communist Consolidation’ formed in the jail. Sunil became regular in Marxist studies. In 1937, he was sent to ‘village internment’ to a village in Phulwaria police station in Mymensingh (now in Bangladesh). He passed his Matric there at the special exam centre. He passed his IA in first class.

After release Sunil took admission in Patna University in Patna. He stayed at the residence of Bihar chief minister Shri Krishna Sinha. Congress had formed the ministry after 1937 elections. Sunil's father was his friend. At first he was denied admission but the chief minister got angry and pressed for it.

He got admission in the department of Economics. His head Dr Gyanchand admitted him soon after learning about his revolutionary exploits!

In Patna Sunil came in contact with Ali Ashraf, the AISF leader, Jagannath Sarkar and others.

A Peasant-Worker-Student League was established in Munger in 1938, headed by Ratan Roy, one of the founders of party in Bihar.

At first Sunil Mukherjee wanted to go to Calcutta, but was instructed not to. He started an agency for the central organ the National Front. P. C. Joshi asked Sunil to come to Gaya to kisan conference in 1939 and asked him to begin preparations for party formation in Bihar.

=== Training in Bombay ===
Sunil was soon called to Bombay for 3-month training in Marxism meant for party secretaries. A wide range of subjects were taught. Besides P. C. Joshi, lectures were delivered by Gangadhar Adhikari, Ajoy Ghosh and R. D. Bhardwaj. The famous historian R. C. Majumdar was present. P. Krishna Pillai from Kerala and Chandrasekharan from Andhra were also present.

=== Foundation of CPI in Bihar ===
On return in July, Sunil began preparations for foundation of CPI. With the outbreak of Second World War in September 1939, the relations between CSP and CPI reached a breaking point due to differences in interpretation.

After mutual consultations, a meeting of available comrades held in Munger on 20 October 1939 attended by 20 (twenty) comrades. Versions regarding the number vary but this is the most accepted one. It was held in a small house belonging to elder sister of Sunil Mukherjee at the banks of the river Ganga (the Ganges). It was the day of Dusshera, which was a good cover. R. D. Bhradwaj attended on behalf of CC CPI. Four among the twenty were given candidate membership, the rest full membership. A five- member Provincial Committee (PC) was formed, consisting of: Sunil Mukherjee (secretary), Ali Ashraf, Rahul Sankrityayana, Gyan Vikas Moitra and Binod Mukherjee.

The meeting included some of the future famous names such as Sunil Mukherjee, Ratan Roy, Shiv Bachan Singh, Rahul Sankrityayana, Vishwanath Mathur etc.

The party in Bihar announced itself on 26 January 1940, the Independence Day. It distributed handbills and pamphlets describing its aims of freedom, class struggle and struggle against imperialism and fascism. A large number of strikes took place in Dalmianagar, Giridih, Patna, etc. Newspapers noted that a new, red, star had risen over Bihar. The Statesman ‘warned’ against the danger from this new ‘menace’, which must be crushed quickly. Sunil Mukherjee, Ali Ashraf and Rahul were arrested in March 1940. In June about 50 were arrested. The membership had risen more than 50 by this time. Sunil Mukherjee was sent to Bhagalpur Central Jail.

=== In Deoli Camp Jail ===
He was sent along with 15 others from Bihar to the infamous Deoli Camp Jail in 1940 along with Ali Ashraf, Rahul, etc. Chandrama Singh, a revolutionary who became Communist, also was there. Others included Yogendra Shukla, Surya Narayan Singh (Socialist) etc. Sunil Mukherjee was put up in Camp Number II (two). Famous Communist leaders like S. A. Dange, Ajoy Ghosh, R. D. Bhardwaj, Soli Batlivala, S. V. Ghate, Dhanwantri and others were there.

Sunil Mukherjee was already ill when brought to Deoli. He was taken to Ajmer for appendix operation under guard by Garhwal Regiment. Dr Young treated him.

He was released in July 1942 after treatment in PMCH, Patna. Provincial Party office was set up in Khazanchi Road, Patna. Processions of August 1942 movement were passing through the streets. Party membership rose to 336 by beginning of 1943. People had begun joining the party. He was closely associated with Swami Sahajanand Saraswati, later general secretary of AIKS, helping him politically train up cadres of AIKS during 1942-44.

Karyanand Sharma joined CPI in 1940. Swami Sahajanand was angry. He told Sunil Mukherjee: You are taking away my cadres! Sunil replied that he was only training them for both party and kisan sabha. Swamiji agreed. A large number of outstanding personalities joined the party during this period, such as Yogendra Sharma, Chaturanan Mishra, Bhogendra Jha, Gangadhar Das, Chandrashekhar Singh and many others. By 1944 the party had grown to 4000.

Party did much work during the Bengal famine of 1943-44 which had also affected Bihar severely.

Sunil Mukherjee attended the first congress of CPI in Bombay in May 1943. He also worked in the TU field in Jamshedpur, Dalmianagar, Giridih etc, helping build the party.

At the beginning of 1947, the party began publishing daily ‘Janashakti’. Sunil Mukherjee married Shibani Mukherjee, a final Year medical student and party member since 1946, in May 1947.

He was sent to Dhanbad among the coal workers. All India Coal Workers Federation was organized with S. A. Dange as president and Sunil Mukherjee general secretary.

=== In Bihar Assembly ===
Party put up Sunil Mukherjee as candidate for Assembly in 1962 elections. He won by 7 thousand votes. CPI won 12 assembly seats. A Lok Sabha seat was also won from Jamshedpur. Sunil Mukherjee was elected leader of CPI assembly group. He delivered effective speeches.

Split in the party in 1964 did not affect it much in Bihar.

=== Work in communal riots in Jamshedpur, 1964 ===
There were severe riots in Jamshedpur in 1964. The Tatas with the help of communal forces organized them. They were among the most horrible ones. Sunil Mukherjee, Kedar Das and others worked very hard to restore peace. Sunil helped the authorities to locate the centres of communal elements wherefrom they organized the riots.

=== Arrest in 1965 ===
Sunil Mukherjee was very active during the anti-Congress wave of the 1960s. He and Ram Manohar Lohia were arrested in 1965. Many leaders were beaten and arrested in Patna Gandhi Maidan.

Samyukta Vidhayak Dal government was formed in 1967. Dr Lohia offered Sunil Mukherjee the chief ministership, but the latter declined as this would create controversy: Samyukta Socialist Party (SSP) was the biggest party in the coalition. Meetings of the Samyukta Vidhayak Dal used to be held at Sunil Mukherjee's residence. It was he who conveyed the decision to make Mahamaya Pd Singh the CM: he was happy beyond words! There were proposals to make Sunil Mukherjee too a minister but he refused.

He was the leader of CPI group in Assembly in 1962-67 and 1969-77. He was leader of opposition during 1973-77.

=== Secretary of party again ===
Sunil Mukherjee was elected secretary of Bihar CPI after Bhatinda congress (1978), from 1978 to 1984. He was member of central executive committee (CEC) of CPI from 1978 to 1984. Earlier he was also CC member in united party.

He died on 30 March 1992, after prolonged illness.
