= Ram Babu Kumar Sankritya =

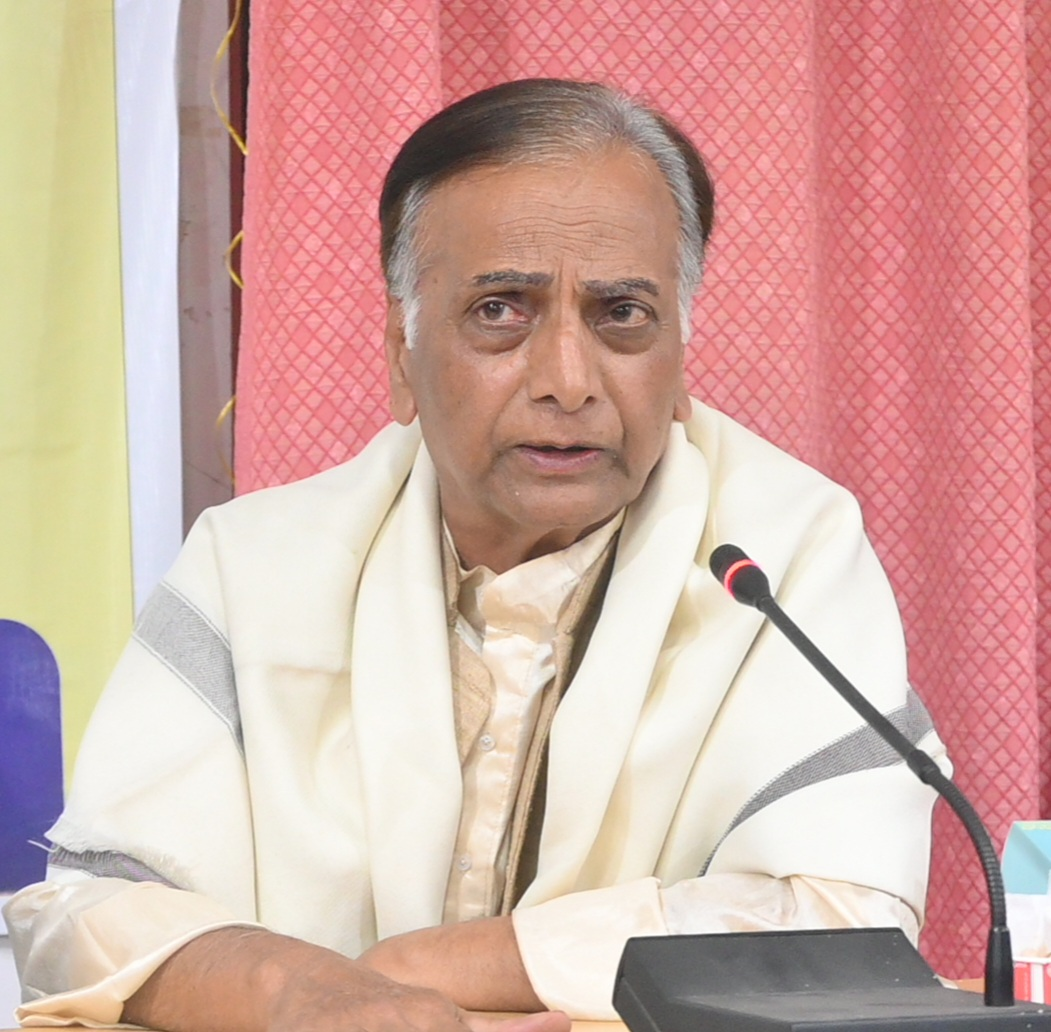
- Ram Babu Kumar Sankritya on 7 February 2026
- Born: 9 February 1953 (age 73); Pakaridixit, East Champaran, Bihar, India
- Occupations: Politician, journalist, author, social activist
- Office: Member of Bihar State Secretariat
- Political party: Communist Party of India

Ram Babu Kumar Sankritya is an Indian politician, journalist, and author from Bihar.He is a senior leader of the Communist Party of India (CPI) and currently serves as a member of the Bihar State Secretariat. He also serves as a National Presidium member of the All India Peace and Solidarity Organisation (AIPSO).

Sankritya contested the 2015 Bihar Legislative Assembly election from the Lauria constituency in West Champaran district as a CPI candidate. He has authored several books on politics, socialism, and globalization, including Bharat Kahan, Asthirikaran vs Deshbhakti, and Beyond Globalization.

He is currently the editor of Janashakti Newspaper, a publication released by the Navchetan Samiti.
