= Mohit =

Mohit is a given name. It is a Sanskrit origin name which means attractive (also another name for Lord Krishna).

== Notable people with the given name include ==
- Mohit Abrol, Indian television actor
- Mohit Ahlawat (actor) (born 1982), Indian actor
- Mohit Ahlawat (cricketer) (born 1995), Indian first-class cricketer
- Mohit Banerji (1912–1961), pioneer of the Communist Party of India in West Bengal, India
- Mohit Bhandari, Indian surgeon
- Mohit Chadda, Indian film actor
- Mohit Chattopadhyay (1934–2012), Bengali Indian playwright, screenwriter, dramatist and poet
- Mohit Chauhan (born 1966), Indian singer
- Mohit Chauhan (actor), Bollywood actor from India
- Mohit Handa (born 1993), Indian cricketer
- Mohit Hooda (born 1998), Indian cricketer
- Mohit Mayur Jayaprakash (born 1993), Indian tennis player
- Mohit Madaan, Bollywood actor
- Mohit Malhotra (born 1986), Indian model and actor
- Mohit Malik, Indian television actor
- Mohit Moitra, Indian revolutionary and independence fighter in the 1930s
- Mohit Raina, Indian actor
- Mohit Ray (born 1954), Indian environmental and human rights activist
- Mohit Sehgal, Indian television actor
- Mohit Sen (1929–2003), Bengali communist intellectual
- Mohit Sharma (born 1988), Indian cricketer
- Mohit Sharma (Delhi cricketer) (born 1991), Indian cricketer
- Mohit Sharma (soldier), Indian Military Officer
- Mohit Suri (born 1981), Indian film director
- Mohit Thadani (born 1991), Rajasthani cricketer
- Md. Abdul Mohit Talukder (born 1958), Bangladeshi politician

== Surname ==
- Vandana Mohit (born 1991), Trinidad and Tobago politician

== See also ==
- Rohit (name)
