= K. Sreenivas Reddy =

Indian journalist

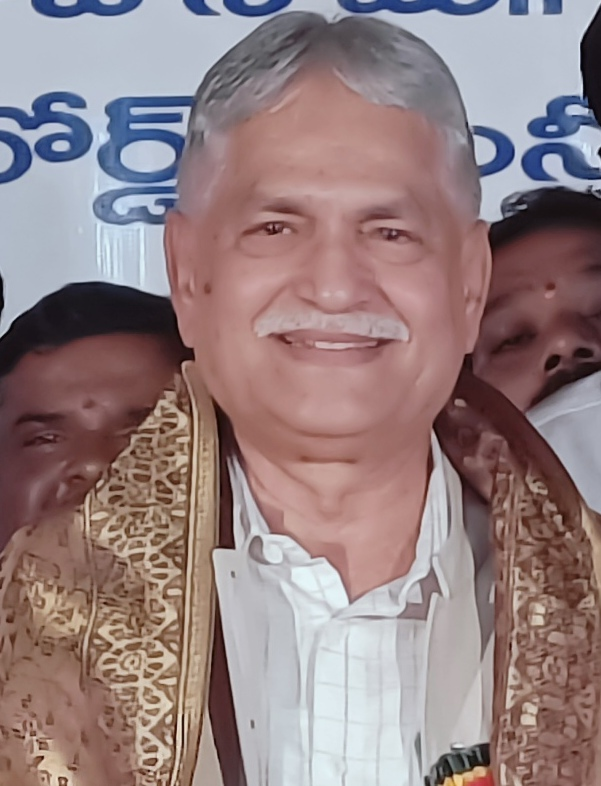
- Born: 7 September 1949 (age 76); Hyderabad Telangana
- Other name: KSR
- Occupations: Journalist & Chairman, Media Academy of Telangana
- Spouse: K.Bharati Reddy
- Children: D Rekha Reddy, Geetha N, K Karteek Reddy

K. Sreenivas Reddy (also spelled Srinivas, born 7 September 1949) is an Indian Telugu language journalist and political analyst. Previously the editor of Visalaandhra newspaper and founder editor of Mana Telangana news paper.he left as the editor ofPraja Paksham, a Telugu daily after being appointed as Chairman, Media Academy Of Telangana.

== Early life ==
Sreenivas Reddy is a B.Sc. graduate.

== Career ==
Sreenivas Reddy appears on all prominent Telugu news channels for his political analysis. He was also The President of Indian Journalists Union (IJU) & Founder Chairman of Press Academy of United Andhra Pradesh in 1996.

He was member of Press Council of India Twice and was also Member of the Central Press accreditation Committee of Government of India.

He visited Number of Countries on Professional front including the then USSR, USA, China etc. He also visited countries along with two Prime Ministers of India on their foreign tours.

He was the member of the two men enquiry committee on paid news appointed by Press Council of India. He coined the word Paid News.
