= Jagannath Sarkar =

Jagannath Sarkar may refer to:

- Jagannath Sarkar (CPI politician), Communist Party of India politician
- Jagannath Sarkar (BJP politician), Bharatiya Janata Party politician
