= Vidya Munshi =

Indian journalist

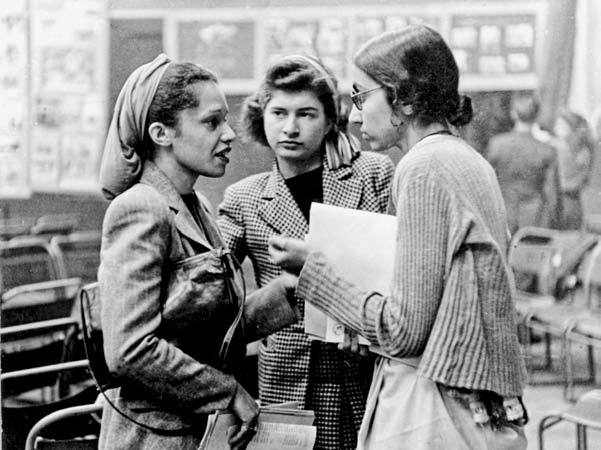
Vidya Kanuga (right) with Esther Cooper Jackson (left) and unknown woman, 1945

Vidya Munshi (née Kanuga; 5 December 1919 – 8 July 2014) was a journalist and leader of Communist Party of India. She has been called, arguably, the first woman journalist of India.

== Early life ==
Vidya Kanuga, later Munshi, belonged to a Gujarati family. She was born in Bombay (Mumbai) on 5 December 1919, to a lawyer father and social activist mother. She stood first among women in the school-leaving exams, and then joined the I.Sc. course in Bombay's Elphinstone College. She decided to set off for England alone to study medicine in 1938.

== In England: communism ==
Her father was a famous criminal lawyer, and she was introduced to politics by her uncle. she reached England in 1938. By the time she prepared for pre-medical exams, the Second World War had broken out. Therefore, instead of returning to India, she joined King's College in Newcastle, Durham. There she came in contact with the Communist ideology and movement. She gave up her studies after three years and became a full-time activist in England. She became a secretary of theFederation of Indian Students’ Societies in England and Ireland (FEDIND). She came in contact with the Communist Party of Great Britain (CPGB) and soon became a member. She was in active contact with the Indian Communists and nationalists there, which shaped her future course of life. She took part in several programs of the CPGB, mainly against fascism.

In 1943 while in England she and her colleagues held their first poster exhibition in Sheffield. The exhibition highlighted the trauma of the people of famine-affected Bengal. The money collected was sent to India for the victims of Bengal famine.

== Foundation of WFDY ==
She took part in the foundation conference of the World Federation of Democratic Youth (WFDY), held in London in October–November, 1945, representing the All India Students’ Federation (AISF). It was attended by delegates from 67 countries. India was represented by Vidya Kanuga, Ketayun Boomla and AH Sader. M Raschid was observer. They attended on behalf of the FEDIND. Vidya Kanuga was the secretary of the commission on Participation of Youth in the Construction of a Stable and Lasting Peace at the WFDY conference.

The first Council meet of WFDY (19 July – 5 August 1946) held in Paris, formed a colonial Bureau. Vidya Kanuga was charged with responsibility of the Bureau. It decided to run a campaign that food should be sent to India as a first priority.

Vidya also attended the founding conference of Women's International Democratic Federation (WIDF) in Paris in 1945 along with Ela Reid, general secretary of Mahila Atma Raksha Samiti (MARS). It was held in Velodrome D’Hiver (Winter Stadium) between 26 November and 1 December 1945. Vidya and Ila Reid represented India at this massive inaugural conference.

She returned to India in 1948 as the representative of the WFDY. She worked in the Preparatory Committee of Southeast Asian Youth Conference held in Calcutta in February 1948.

== Women's movement and journalism ==
She attended the first congress of National Federation of Indian Women (NFIW) in 1954 in Calcutta. She was in its Press Liaison Committee. She was thus among the founders of the NFIW.

On return from UK, she married geographer and journalist Sunil Munshi, who later became a famous intellectual, journalist and Communist. Sunil was earlier also an editor of the famous journal of AISF ‘The Student’ in Bombay. She also wrote often in ‘The Student’. It was in this journal that she was groomed as a journalist. Then she shifted to Calcutta and worked as correspondent for Blitz. She was asked to edit a Bengali paper ‘Chalar Pathe’ even when she did not know the language well. She had to learn it hard and quick.

She worked as the Calcutta correspondent of the weekly journal of Bombay the ''Blitz'', from 1952 to 1962. She has been, arguably, called the first woman journalist of India.

She headed the board that published the CPI's mouthpiece, Kalantar for several years. and was an active member of the party. She headed State Women's Commission until 2000. She documented her life, the political upheavals and the shaping of women's movements of her time in great detail in a memoir, ''In Retrospect. War-time Memories and Thoughts on Women's Movement.''
