= Sardesai =

Sardesai is an Indian surname that may refer to

- Dilip Sardesai (1940–2007), Indian cricketer
- Govind Sakharam Sardesai (1865–1959), Indian historian
- Hema Sardesai, Indian playback singer
- Madhavi Sardesai (1962–2014), Indian scholar, publisher and writer
- Manohar Rai Sardesai (1925–2006), Indian poet and writer
- Nitin Sardesai (born 1963), Indian politician
- Rajdeep Sardesai (born 1965), Indian news anchor and author
- S. G. Sardesai (1907–1996), Indian communist leader
- Vijai Sardesai (born 1970), Indian politician
- Vinay Vivek Sardesai (born 1993), Indian scholar, Engineer
