= Mukti Sangharsh =

Communist periodicals published in India

- Type: Weekly newspaper
- Format: Print
- Owner: Communist Party of India
- Publisher: D. Raja
- Editor: Mahesh Rathi
- Political alignment: Left-wing
- Language: Hindi
- Headquarters: New Delhi
- Website: https://www.newagemukti.com title=Official website

The Mukti Sangharsh is the central organ of the Communist Party of India in Hindi. Mahesh Rathi is the current editor of Mukti Sangharsh.
