= Prananath Patnaik =

Indian politician

Prananath Pattnaik
- ପ୍ରାଣନାଥ ପଟ୍ଟନାୟକ

Member of the Odisha Legislative Assembly
- In office 1 April 1957 – 25 February 1961
- Constituency: Khurda

Personal details
- Born: 16 November 1905 Dimiri, Puri district, Orissa Province, British India
- Died: 5 October 1970 (aged 64) Odisha, India
- Party: Communist Party of India
- Other political affiliations: Congress Socialist Party (1934–1936)
- Spouse: Manjari Patnaik
- Children: Prabhat Patnaik
- Parent: Madan Mohan Patnaik
- Education: Ravenshaw College, Kashi Vidyapith
- Occupation: Politician, freedom fighter, editor

Prananath Patnaik (16 November 1905 – 5 October 1970) was an Indian politician and leader of Communist Party of India. He was Member at Orissa Legislative Assembly.

== Biography ==
=== Early life and education ===
Patnaik completed his primary schooling at Kanas Primary School and later attended Puri Zilla School. In 1926, he joined Ravenshaw College in Cuttack as a science student. While studying there, he became heavily influenced by nationalist ideologies and actively joined the Indian national movement in 1930. He subsequently moved to Banaras, where he obtained his Bachelor of Arts (Shastri) degree from the Kashi Vidyapith. Throughout the Indian freedom struggle, Patnaik was arrested and imprisoned ten times for his anti-colonial activities, specifically during the major campaigns of 1930, 1932, 1939, 1940, and 1942.

=== Political and peasant movements ===
Patnaik was a foundational pioneer of the socialist and communist movements in Odisha. When the Utkal provincial branch of the Congress Socialist Party was established in Cuttack in 1934, he served as its first President. On 1 April 1936, alongside prominent leaders like Bhagabati Charan Panigrahi and Gurucharan Patnaik, he co-founded a secret cell that formed the Odisha unit of the Communist Party of India.

He was also an instrumental architect of agrarian resistance in the region. He helped form the Utkal Provincial Krushak Sangha in 1935, which subsequently functioned as the state branch of the All India Kisan Sabha upon its inception in 1936. Patnaik spearheaded the Praja Mandal movement against feudal rulers in the ex-princely states of Ranpur, Khandapara, and Nayagarh. Following India's independence, his political activism resulted in further incarcerations in 1949 and 1964, during which he undertook a 43-day hunger strike inside prison.

=== Journalism and later life ===
As a writer and journalist, Patnaik served as one of the early editors of the Odia weekly newspaper Nua Dunia, which acted as the official organ of the Communist Party of India in Odisha. Between 1964 and 1965, he toured the Soviet Union as a designated member of an Indian journalists' delegation. He was elected as a Member of the Odisha Legislative Assembly from the Khurda constituency, serving from 1 April 1957 to 25 February 1961. Following a prolonged illness brought on by decades of political hardship, Patnaik died on 5 October 1970.

== Bibliography ==
- Ashanta Kalira Sahitya (Odia prose)
- Geeta Sanskruti
- Prabasare Odia Sanskruti
- History of Communist Movement in Odisha
