= Kunjulekshmi Saradamoni =

Indian historian and economist (1928–2021)

- Born: Pattathanam, Kollam, Kerala
- Died: 26 May 2021; Thiruvananthapuram, Kerala

Academic background
- Education: University of Paris VII
- Thesis: Changements économiques et sociaux au Kerala: la caste des Pulayas depuis 1800 (1971)
- Doctoral advisor: Louis Dumont

Academic work
- Discipline: Historian
- Sub-discipline: Indian economic history
- Institutions: Indian Statistical Institute
- Main interests: Women's and Dalit studies
- Notable works: Emergence of a Slave Caste: Pulayas of Kerala (1980)

Kunjulekshmi Saradamoni (1928 – 2021) was an Indian historian, economist and a specialist in Dalit and gender studies, and a president of the National Federation of Indian Women. She is best known for her studies of chattel enslavement of the lower castes in Kerala, which upended the conventional wisdom that there had been no historical slavery in south India.

== Life ==
K. Saradamoni was born in Pattathanam, Kerala in 1928. She attended the Government College for Women, Thiruvananthapuram, and was in the first cohort of Economics graduates from the city's University College. There she met the Indologist Madeleine Biardeau, on whose advice she would later go to Paris for doctoral studies. She obtained a M.Litt. degree in Economics from Madras University. Between 1969 and 1971, she was at the University of Paris VII for doctoral studies under Louis Dumont. Her thesis, Changements économiques et sociaux au Kerala: la caste des Pulayas depuis 1800, appeared in 1971.

Saradamoni married N. Gopinathan Nair, a journalist who founded the Janayugom magazine. They had two daughters, G. Asha and G. Arunima, the latter of whom is the head of the Kerala Council for Historical Research.

She lived in Thiruvananthapuram in her last years, where she was active in social initiatives such as the Heritage Walk. She died on 26 May 2021.

== Career ==
Saradamoni began her career at the Bureau of Economic and Statistical Studies in Kerala. She joined the Indian Statistical Institute in New Delhi in 1961, and taught there till her retirement in 1988.

The Kerala model of socio-economic development has been much studied and lauded. Its prime metric of women's empowerment was that of health outcomes and literacy levels equivalent to men's. Saradamoni's criticisms of this narrow scope were noteworthy, and she pointed out that in political power, women continued to lag, and crimes against women were no less than in the less-developed and more patriarchal northern states of India. In Matriliny Transformed: Family, Law and Ideology in Twentieth Century Travancore (1999), she investigated the effects of matrilineal inheritance on Kerala women, which offered some amount of security. However, redistributive legislation in Kerala (Kerala Agrarian Relations Act, 1960) apportioned excess land from landlords to tenants, reducing the holdings of matrilineal families and thereby lessening the power of women. While landholding women continued to be active in management or cultivation of their lands, in several cases they lost their possession post-reform either on widowhood or because of ceilings of ownership, and were able to maintain control only if they had male relatives to support them.

Expanding her coverage to Asia, she studied the economic imbalances faced by women and their positions within the household, publishing an edited work Finding the Household: Conceptual and Methodological Issues (1992). This pointed out that the metrics of data collection in surveys distort and reduce women's contributions, for example by discarding women's household work in classification as labour, but was criticised for not offering any methodologies to avert the distortions.

Her investigations of the shortfalls of the Kerala model also addressed the deprivation faced by the scheduled castes in the state. Her 1980 publication Emergence of a Slave Caste: Pulayas of Kerala proved the existence of caste slavery and its economic equivalence with chattel slavery, something that the academy had been reluctant to admit. Along the lines of her researches into the effects of agricultural reforms on women, referred to above, she showed (Divided Poor: Study of a Kerala Village, 1981) that the lower caste Pulayas had barely any uplift. While they did transition from agrestic slavery to wage labour, they were far less likely to own agricultural land, though they were overwhelmingly farm labourers, and their social disabilities continued unabated. The reason, she argued, was because of shortage of agricultural land for redistribution. This was rebutted by critics because higher caste landholders had sufficient non-agricultural income, so there was no reason that the Pulayas, so dependent on agriculture, couldn't own more of the land that they cultivated. Furthermore she showed that the benefits of education also fell unevenly on Pulayas - as they were unable to obtain post-secondary employment at the same rates as the upper castes, they were forced to return to agricultural work, leading to the unfortunate situation of high-school educated Pulayas participating in agriculture when mainly less educated upper castes did so.

== Selected works ==
- Emergence of a Slave Caste: Pulayas of Kerala. 1980.
- Divided Poor: Study of a Kerala Village. Ajanta. 1981.
- R. Metha; K. Saradamoni, eds. (1983). Women and Rural Transformation. Delhi: Indian Council of Social Science Research.
- K. Saradamoni, ed. (1985). Women's Work and Society. Calcutta: Indian Statistical Institute.
- Filling the Rice Bowl: Women in Paddy Cultivation. Sangam Books. 1991.
- K. Saradamoni, ed. (1992). Finding the Household: Conceptual and Methodological Issues. Sage Publications India.
- Matriliny Transformed: Family, Law and Ideology in Twentieth Century Travancore. New Delhi: Sage Publications India. 1999.

== Bibliography ==
- Deconchy, Jean-Pierre; Chalot, Chantal (1972). "Thèses et Mémoires présentés en France, touchant à la sociologie et à la psychologie des religions". Archives de sciences sociales des religions. 33.
- Kunhaman, M. (1982). "Dividing the Poor?". Economic and Political Weekly. 17 (33): 1314–1315. JSTOR 4371238.
- Shah, A. M. (1993). "Finding the Household: Conceptual and Methodological Issues by K. Saradamoni". Sociological Bulletin. 42 (1/2). JSTOR 23620260.
- Arun, Shoba (1999). "Does Land Ownership Make a Difference? Women's Roles in Agriculture in Kerala, India". Gender and Development. 7 (3): 19–27. doi:10.1080/741923248. JSTOR 4030407. PMID 12349476.
- Kodoth, Praveena (2004). "Gender, Property Rights and Responsibility for Farming in Kerala". Economic and Political Weekly. 39 (19): 1911–1920. JSTOR 4414994.
- Praveen, S. R. (26 May 2021). "Social scientist K. Saradamoni dead". The Hindu.
- "Noted social scientist Dr K Saradamoni no more". The New Indian Express. 26 May 2021.
- "Noted Kerala social scientist, economist and feminist K Saradamoni passes away". The News Minute. 26 May 2021.
- Radhakrishnan, M. G. (18 June 2021). "K. Saradamoni Leaves Behind Pioneering Work in Women's and Dalit Studies". The Wire.
