= Kembavuta =

- Type: Weekly Newspaper
- Format: Print
- Owner(s): Communist Party of India Karnataka State Council
- Publisher: Sathi Sundresh
- Editor: Shivaraj R Biradar
- Founded: 1974
- Political alignment: Left-wing
- Language: Kannada
- Headquarters: Bangalore
- Free online archives: "epaper".

The Kembavuta is a Kannada weekly newspaper published in Karnataka, India. It is the official organ of the Karnataka State Council of the Communist Party of India. Shivaraj R Biradar is the editor of Kembavuta.
