= Kunwar Mohammad Ashraf =

Marxist historian and CP India leader (b. 1903, d. 1962)

Kunwar Mohammad Ashraf (24 November 1903 – 7 June 1962) was a Marxist historian and leader of the Communist Party of India. His works included articulating Muslim engagement with politics using a creative way during the late colonial and post-independence periods.

== Early life and education ==
He was born to a Muslim Rajput family in Uttar Pradesh, Aligarh district, Hathras tehsil, Daryapur village on 24 November 1903.

Ashraf began his studies in the Upper Primary School of Daryapur. He also undertook courses at Arya Samaj High School in Aligarh and the Muslim High School in Moradabad. Besides Sanskrit and Hindi, he also studied Persian and Urdu. He passed his matric exam in 1918. Ashraf got admitted to MAO College, Aligarh, where he graduated with a bachelor of arts in Arabic logic and history.

He passed his BA from this institution, in Islamic philosophy and history from Jamia Millia. He also worked in Tilak Swaraj Fund, Khadi campaign, Hindu-Muslim unity campaign, etc. He created a record by passing LLB in first class in 1926

While working in the Non-Co-operation Movement, he met Shaukat Usmani in 1922 who introduced him to socialism. In 1923 he met Muzaffar Ahmed and Kutubuddin in Calcutta. In 1926 he got to know feudal system at close quarters in Alwar. He had gone there after passing MA in 1926 and was honored by the Maharaja as state guest. He got a scholarship from the Riyasat for foreign studies.

Ashraf reached London in 1927 and studied law and also practiced as a barrister. He did his PhD on the ‘Social Life of India, 1200-1550’. He came in contact with Shapurji Saklatvala, Sajjad Zaheer and others, and finally adopted Communist ideology.

He left everything and went back to London. He completed his PhD. In the mean- time, he along with Srinivas Iyyengar, Md Ali, Saklatvala and others founded the London Committee of the Indian National Congress. He also got actively involved in Marxist activities.

== Political and academic career ==
On return to India in 1932, he became a professor in Muslim University. In the meantime, he joined the Congress and soon became a leading figure of its leftwing. He was included in the central executive of the Congress Socialist Party, along with Jaiprakash Narain, EMS, Acharya Narendra Dev, Z A Ahmed, Sajjad Zaheer, Ram Manohar Lohia, Ashok Mehta, etc. He was made one of the secretaries of the AICC in 1936. Congress president made him in-charge of Muslim Affairs. Ashraf worked in the AICC office in Allahabad.

Dr Ashraf was assigned by CPI to work on the student front too, and he used to guide the CPI fraction in the student movement. He presided over the Calcutta session of All India Students Federation in January 1939, and inaugurated the historic AISF session held in Nagpur in (December) 1940. He became a centre of attraction of student meetings all over the country, and played a very important role in the guidance of the AISF work. Dr Ashraf also worked as the secretary to Maulana Abul Kalam Azad.

Dr Ashraf along with other Communist leaders was interned in Deoli Detention Camp 1940 onwards. He participated in the 30-day hunger strike there. This and the conditions in Deoli Camp seriously affected his health. He was released in 1943 with a shattered health. He worked in the party centre in Bombay after release, and wrote a lot. He shifted to Delhi in 1946 and used to live in the party commune in Daryaganj on a wage of just Rs 8. Most of the comrades in the commune were youth, with Ashraf as the eldest. He was very co-operative, soft, humble and highly disciplined.

=== Exile ===
Party decided to publish ‘Awami Daur’, an Urdu daily, from Delhi. Dr K M Ashraf was appointed its editor. Dr Ashraf was asked by the party to shift to Pakistan in 1948 after ‘Awami Daur’ was closed down. The conditions there were very difficult and Communists had to face severe repressions. Party was banned there and Ashraf had to go underground. He was arrested on the charge of being an Indian living in Pakistan illegally. His physical condition deteriorated further. He was released on the condition that he would never return to Pakistan. India too was not prepared to accept him as he was not an Indian citizen. He went to England and resumed his research in Indian society and history. He was also undergoing treatment. He worked in the British Museum.

He was not happy and wanted to return to India. There followed long years of efforts despite his closeness to Nehru and Maulana Azad. Nehru took special interest.

=== Return to India ===
It was only after two years’ efforts that he could get Indian citizenship. At the request of Nehru he worked in Srinagar on the history of Kashmiri people. Two years later, he joined KM College in Delhi and became head of history department. He presented several papers to the Indian History Congresses.

== Death ==
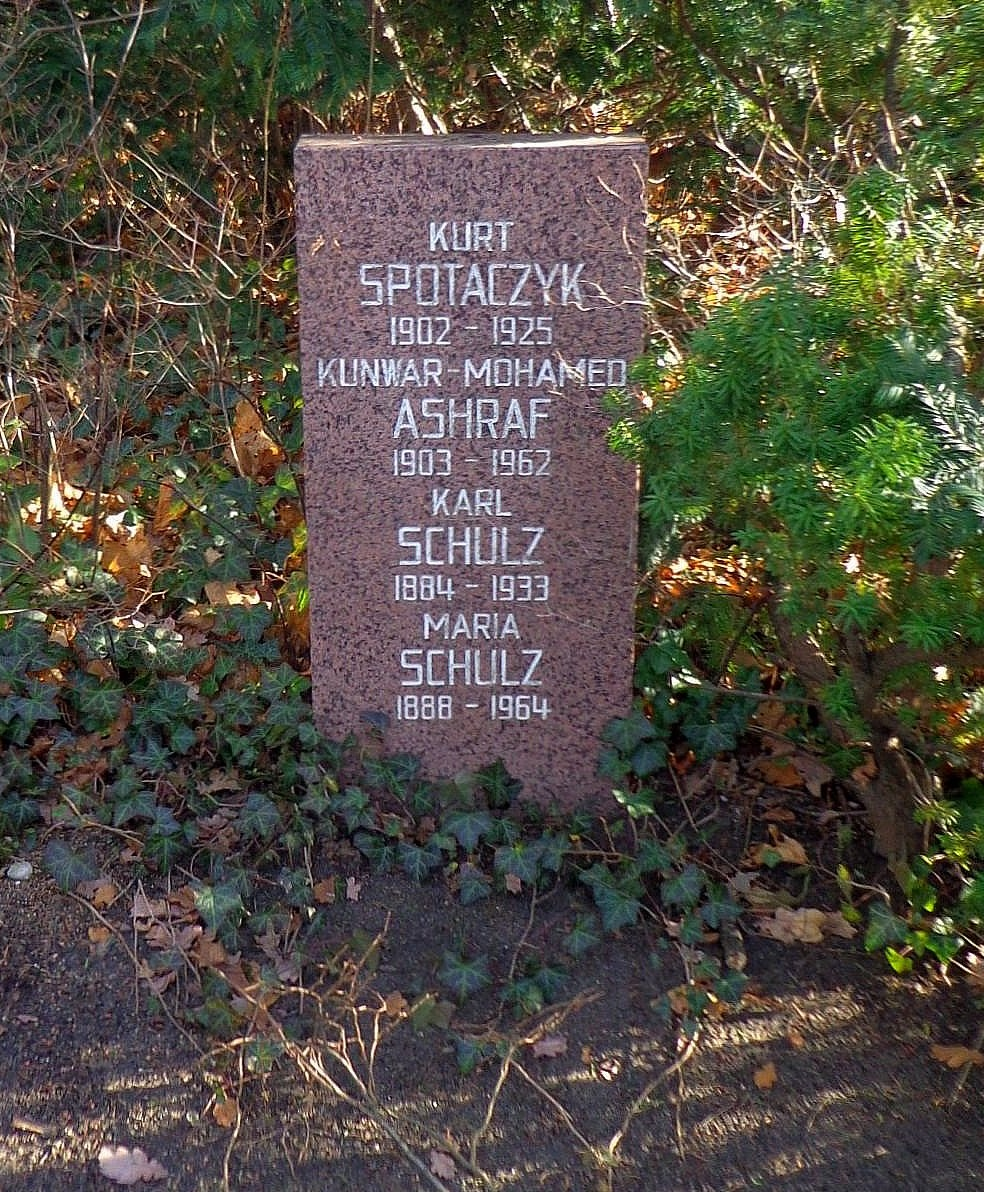
Kunwar Mohammad Ashraf's grave in Friedrichsfelde Cemetery, Berlin

Ashraf died on 7 June 1962, in Berlin due to heart attack. He was cremated and honoured with burial in the Pergolenweg Ehrengrab section of Berlin's Friedrichsfelde Cemetery.
