= People's Service Corps =

The People's Service Corps or Jana Seva Dal is an Indian left-wing, nonprofit, political, beneficiary and voluntary organisation, founded by Communist Party of India. It was formed and a constitution for it was written in the 1980s.
