= Praja Paksham =

Daily Telugu newspaper

Prajapaksham
- Type: Daily Newspaper
- Format: Print
- Owner: Navachetana Vignana Samithi
- Editor: Makkena Subba Rao
- Founded: 22 October 2018
- Political alignment: Communist
- Language: Telugu
- Headquarters: H.No. 12-1-493/VA, Giriprasad Bhavan, Bandlaguda(Nagole), GSI Post, Hyderabad, Telangana 500068 040-29884450/51
- City: Hyderabad, Khammam, Karimnagar, Mahaboobnagar
- Website: https://epaper.prajapaksham.in
- Free online archives: https://epaper.prajapaksham.in

The Praja Paksham is a Telugu daily newspaper published in Telangana, India. It is run by Navachethana Vignana Samithi. K. Sreenivas Reddy is the first editor of Praja Paksham. Prajapaksham was launched after formation of Telangana state, as its predecessor Visalaandhra remained in Andhra Pradesh. Navachethana Vignana Samithi was formed and started Prajapaksham Telugu Daily, as well as, managed Navachethana Publishing House, Navachethana Book Houses.

Presently, Prajapaksham have been published simultaneously from Hyderabad, Khammam, Karimnagar, Mahaboobnagar. This newspaper widely covers polictics, national, international, film, sports, culture, human interest news, stories and analysis.
