= C. Rajeswara Rao =

Former General secretary of the Communist party of India

Chandra Rajeswara Rao

General Secretary of the Communist Party of India
- In office 1964–1990
- Preceded by: E. M. S. Namboodiripad
- Succeeded by: Indrajit Gupta
- In office 1950–1954
- Preceded by: B. T. Ranadive
- Succeeded by: Ajoy Ghosh

Personal details
- Born: 6 June 1914 Mangalapuram, Krishna, Madras Presidency, British India (Now Andhra Pradesh, India)
- Died: 9 April 1994 (aged 79)
- Children: Chandra Chandrasekhar (son)
- Occupation: Indian freedom fighter, socialist, The leader in Telangana armed struggle
- Awards: Order of Lenin (1974)

Chandra Rajeswara Rao (June 6, 1914 – April 9, 1994) was an Indian communist politician. He was one of the leaders of the Telangana Rebellion (1946–1951). He also worked as the general secretary of the Communist Party of India (CPI) for 28 years before giving up the post in 1992 for health reasons.

== Life ==
Rao came from an affluent peasant Kamma family. He was born on June 6, 1914, in Mangalapuram village, Krishna district of Andhra Pradesh State, India. He received his medical education at Banaras Hindu University in Varanasi and a medical college in Vishakhapatnam. He joined the Communist Party of India (CPI) in 1931. Rao was vice-chairman of the All-India Kisan Sabha (Peasants’ League) in 1954 and 1955. In December 1964 he was elected general secretary of the National Council of the CPI. He was awarded the Order of Lenin in 1974.

His son, Chandra Chandrasekhar, and grandson, Chandra Jaideep, are involved in politics in Andhra Pradesh.

== Participation in the Telangana Rebellion ==
The situation in Hyderabad in 1946 was increasingly tense. In response, the Andhra Mahasabha and the Communist Party of India (CPI) opted for armed resistance, believing it the only course of action open to the people. Under the leadership of P.C. Joshi, the CPI initiated an armed struggle against the Nizam's rule with the goal of its overthrow. This conflict spanned from 1946 to 1948.

India gained independence during this period, and a Communist raised the Indian flag in Hyderabad. However, the Nizam refused to accede to India, necessitating negotiations for the state's integration. Meanwhile, the CPI's second congress in Calcutta in February 1948 saw a rise in left-sectarian and adventurist leadership, leading to the removal of P.C. Joshi and the appointment of B.T. Ranadive as general secretary.[3] A key figure in the Telangana armed struggle, Ranadive's policies were not universally accepted within the party, but many, including those from Andhra, supported the armed struggle. Despite common perception, he was elected to the central committee in 1948, not the politburo.

While there were differing views within the party, often termed the 'Russian line' and the 'Chinese line,' both factions converged on the issue of armed struggle.[5] By September 13, 1948, Indian forces had toppled the Nizam and integrated Hyderabad into India, also granting concessions to peasants. These were the primary objectives of the armed struggle, which logically should have ended. Nevertheless, the central leadership maintained the struggle.

The disastrous consequences of this policy became evident by 1950, resulting in the replacement of Ranadive by C.Rajeswara Rao as general secretary at a Central Committee meeting in Calcutta in June 1950. Rao, the architect of the new 'Andhra line,' failed to resolve the crisis, leading to the realization that this approach was also flawed. Consequently, a four-member CPI delegation, including C. Rajeswara Rao, S.A. Dange, K. Govinda Rao, C.R. Vallabhan Iyer (Mani Iyer), Basavpunnaiah, and Ajoy Ghosh, traveled to the Soviet Union to consult with Stalin on strategy and tactics. This led to the publication of draft party programs and policy statements in April 1951 and the election of Ajoy Ghosh as general secretary at a special underground party conference in Calcutta in 1951.
