= Yugantar =

- Type: Weekly Newspaper
- Format: Print
- Owner(s): Communist Party of India Maharashtra State Council
- Publisher: Govind Anant Patkar
- Political alignment: Left-wing
- Language: Marathi
- Headquarters: Mumbai
- Website: yugantarweekly.com
- Free online archives: "epaper".

The Yugantar is a Marathi weekly newspaper published in Maharashtra, India. It is the official organ of the Maharashtra State Council of the Communist Party of India.
