= Annie Raja =

Indian politician

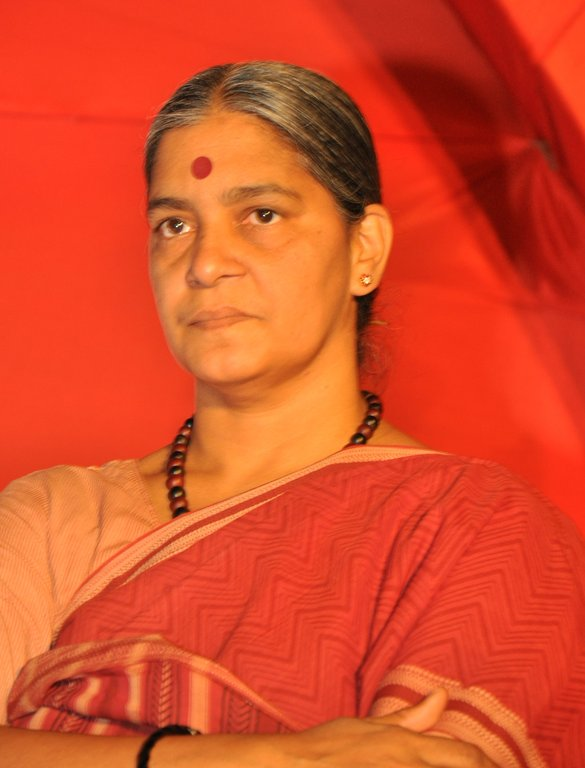

General Secretary of the National Federation of Indian Women
- In office 2005 – 2024
- Preceded by: Sehba Farooqui
- Succeeded by: Nisha Siddhu

Personal details
- Born: Aralam, Kannur, Kerala, India
- Party: Communist Party of India
- Spouse: D. Raja (m. 1990)
- Children: Aparajitha Raja
- Occupation: Politician

Annie Raja is an Indian politician and a member of the Communist Party of India. She was the General Secretary of National Federation of Indian Women (NFIW). She is also a member of the National Secretariat of Communist Party of India. She is married to the present General Secretary of the Communist Party of India, D. Raja.
