= Nua Dunia =

Indian weekly newspaper

Nuadunia
- Type: Weekly Newspaper
- Format: Print
- Owner(s): Communist Party of India Odisha State Council
- Publisher: Prasant Patjoshi
- Editor: Ramesh Chandra Padhi
- Founded: 1942
- Political alignment: Left-wing
- Language: Odia
- Headquarters: Bhubaneswar
- Website: www.nuadunia.com

The Nua Dunia is a Odia weekly newspaper published in Odisha, India. It is the official organ of the Odisha State Council of the Communist Party of India. Ramesh Chandra Padhi is the editor of Nuadunia.

Nuadunia was established in 1942, and was initially published from Cuttack as the organ of the Utkal State Council of CPI. Initial editors were Mohan Das, Prananath Patnaik, Ramakrushna Pati, Sarat Patnaik. As of the early 1970s Gurucharan Patnaik was the editor of the weekly.

As of the early 2000s, Nuadunia had a circulation of 20,483.

Initially the newspaper was named Janajudha ('People's War').
