= Janashakti =

Organ of Communist Party of India Bihar State Council

- Type: Weekly
- Format: Print
- Owner: Communist Party of India Bihar State Council
- Publisher: Navchetan Simiti
- Editor: Ram Babu Kumar Sankritya
- Founded: 1947; 79 years ago
- Political alignment: Left-wing
- Language: Hindi
- Headquarters: Patna

The Janashakti is the organ of the Communist Party of India Bihar State Council. The first editor was Sunil Mukherjee and it started in 1947.
