= Doraisamy Raja =

General secretary of the Communist party of India

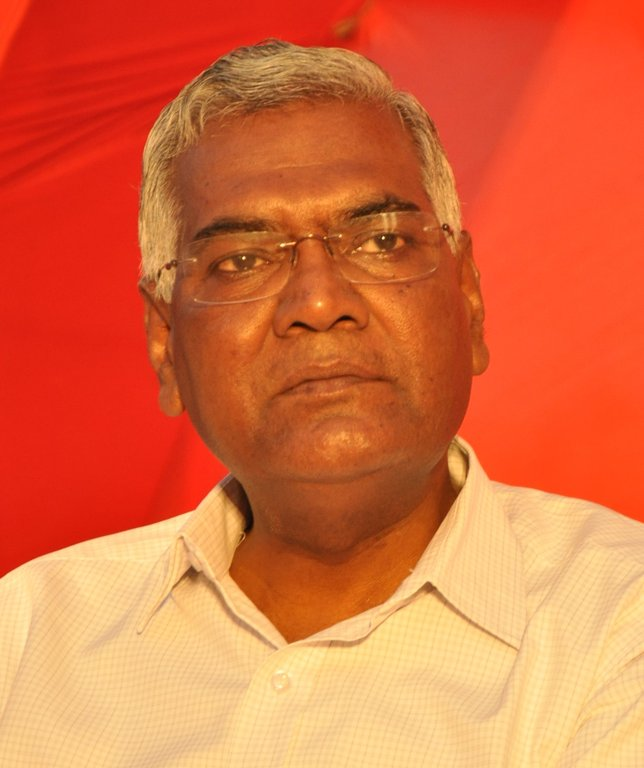

General Secretary of the Communist Party of India
- Incumbent
- Assumed office 21 July 2019
- Preceded by: Suravaram Sudhakar Reddy

Member of Parliament, Rajya Sabha
- In office 25 July 2007 – 24 July 2019
- Constituency: Tamil Nadu

Personal details
- Born: 3 June 1949 (age 77) Chithathoor, North Arcot district, Madras Province, Dominion of India (now Vellore District, Tamil Nadu, India)
- Citizenship: Indian
- Party: Communist Party of India
- Spouse: Annie Raja (m. 1990)
- Children: Aparajitha Raja
- Parents: P. Doraisamy; Nayagam
- Education: Bachelor of Science; Bachelor of Education
- Alma mater: Government Thirumagal Mill's College, Gudiyattam; Government Teachers College
- Occupation: Politician

Doraisamy Raja (born 3 June 1949) is an Indian politician and the General Secretary of the Communist Party of India (CPI) since July 2019. He is a former member of the Rajya Sabha from Tamil Nadu. He was the national secretary of the Communist Party of India (CPI) from 2019 to Present

== Early life and education ==
Raja was born in Chithathoor, a village near Gudiyatham in present-day Vellore district of Tamil Nadu, to a Dalit family. His father, P. Doraisamy, and mother, Nayagam, were landless agricultural workers.

He completed a B.Sc. from G.T.M. College in Gudiyattam, and a B.Ed. from Government Teachers College in Vellore. He was the first graduate in a predominantly Dalit village. Till he finished primary school, Raja survived on a mid-day meal but in high school he often went hungry because his mother couldn't afford lunch for him and there were no free meals. Raja claimed that he developed his reading habit when he was allowed in the reading rooms during the PT periods because the PT teacher knew he was often on empty stomach.

While in college, he became active in student politics.

== Personal life ==
Raja met his wife, Annie Raja, while they were both in the All India Youth Federation, and they married on 7 January 1990 in a simple wedding. She is now the general secretary of the National Federation of Indian Women, the women wing of the CPI, and they have a daughter together named Aparajitha Raja. Aparajitha Raja was herself an activist during her student days.

During April 2021, Raja was diagnosed with COVID-19 while campaigning for election and had to be admitted to AIIMS.

== Political career ==
During college, he joined the All India Students Federation and became active in student politics. He later became the leader of the All India Youth Federation and was the State Secretary of the Tamil Nadu unit from 1975 to 1980, and was then elected general secretary from 1985 to 1990. He became the national secretary of the Communist Party of India (CPI) in 1994 and served until 2019. On 21 July 2019, the National Council of the CPI elected him as the general secretary of the party.

Raja was first elected to Rajya Sabha in July 2007 from Tamil Nadu and was re-elected in 2013.

Raja took over as general secretary of Communist Party of India (CPI) on 21 July 2019. Raja was the first Dalit to occupy the position in a mainstream communist party. His name was proposed unanimously by the CPI national secretariat.

Writing for the Indian Express regarding the Russian invasion of Ukraine, he wrote that "If peace is to prevail in the world, NATO should be disbanded."

== Bibliography ==
- Dalit Question: The Way Forward (New Delhi, CPI Publication, 2007)
- Marx and Ambedkar: Continuing the Dialogue by D. Raja, N. Muthumohan (New Century Book House, 2018)
- D. Raja in the Parliament by Rajeev Suman (The Marginalised Publication, 2021)
