= Mangalapuram, Krishna =

Mangalapuram
- Village
- Interactive map of Mangalapuram
- Location in Andhra Pradesh, India Mangalapuram (India)
- Coordinates: 16°06′48″N 80°58′53″E
- Country: India
- State: Andhra Pradesh
- District: Krishna

Languages
  - Official: Telugu
- Time zone: UTC+5:30 (IST)

Mangalapuram is a village in Challapalli mandal, located in Krishna district of the Indian state of Andhra Pradesh.
