= Nirupama Rath =

Social activist and writer

Nirupama Rath was an Indian freedom fighter, social activist and writer. Dr Rath was one of the founding fellows of the Indian Medical Association. She served as the State IMA's president for three straight years from 1987. She took a keen interest in the Indian freedom struggle since her childhood and actively participated in the Quit India Movement in 1942.

She was deeply involved in various social services and became the Founder President of Utkla Mahila Sammilani as well as the Working Women’s Hostel.

== Literary works ==
Her literary pursuits won her widespread acclaim and she was accorded the Orissa Sahitya Academy Samman in 2003. Her works ‘Prasuti Bigyan’ has been taken in as a textbook for nurses and midwives. Among her other works are ‘Bharatiya Swadhinata re Nari’, ‘Alibha Smruti’ and ‘Abhula Anubhuti’, ‘Samajik Niryatana’, ‘Masala’, ‘Nari O Bicharalaya’, ‘Diganta’, ‘Kanya and Sishu Sampada’ among others.

== Awards and honours ==
- Soviet Land Nehru Award in 1972
- National Unity Award in 1993
- Suprativa and Chalapath Samman
- Orissa Sahitya Academy Samman in 2003

== Death ==
Dr Nirupama Rath died at her Dargha Bazaar residence in Odisha in 2011. She was 86 at the time of her death and is survived by two sons Dr. Jayant Rath and Rajat Rath.

== Publications ==
- Rath, Nirupama (2006). Education for modernising tribals: with special reference to Andaman and Nicobar islands. New Delhi: Deep & Deep. ISBN 978-81-7629-854-4.
- Nath, Rabindranath; Nath, Nirupama (2014). Recreating History of Andaman & Nicobar Islands. Akansha Publishing House. ISBN 978-8183703871.
