= Conference of Youth and Students of Southeast Asia Fighting for Freedom and Independence =

1948 conference

The Conference of Youth and Students of Southeast Asia Fighting for Freedom and Independence, also referred to as the Southeast Asian Youth Conference, was an international youth and students event held in Calcutta, India on 19–23 February 1948. It was co-organized by the World Federation of Democratic Youth and the International Union of Students. It has often been claimed that the conference was the starting point for a series of armed communist rebellions in different Asian countries.

== Preparations ==
In 1947, a four-member delegation of WFDY travelled through different Asian countries. The delegation consisted of Olga Chechetkina (Soviet Union, journalist specialized in Southeast Asian affairs), Jean Lautissier, Rajko Tomović (Yugoslavia), and M. O. Oleson (Denmark). The purpose of the fact-finding tour was to survey the colonial situation and establish links with Asian youth movements. The mission had initially been scheduled for 1946, but delayed due to the conflict in Vietnam and the refusal of French authorities to issue permits for the delegation to enter Vietnam.

The delegation arrived in India in February 1947. They made contacts with different delegations that attended the Inter-Asian Relations Conference in Delhi. In Delhi, they discussed with Indonesian representatives the possibility of holding a pan-Asian youth conference in Indonesia in November 1947. In May, the WFDY team visited Indonesia and met with several high-ranking leaders (such as Sukarno, Hatta, etc.). In June 1947, the WFDY executive decided to go ahead with the plans, but limit the scope of the conference to Southeast Asia. The Indonesians began preparations to host the conference in Madiun. However, in July 1947 (following the World Festival of Youth and Students), the WFDY executive decided to move the conference to Calcutta and postpone it to February 1948, as Indonesia was considered unsafe after Dutch attacks. The decision greatly disappointed the prospective Indonesian hosts.

== Attendance ==
The conference was attended by delegations from Burma, China, Ceylon, India, Indonesia, Malaya, Nepal, Pakistan, the Philippines, the Soviet Union and Vietnam. Indian organizations present included the All India Trade Union Congress, the All India Students Federation, the All India Kisan Sabha, the Socialist Unity Centre of India, the Andhra Youth Federation, and a sector of the All India Students Congress.

Malaya was represented by Lee Song. The Indonesian delegation consisted of two persons, Francisca C. Fanggidaej and Supeno. From Pakistan, the Pakistan Federation of Democratic Youth was represented, amongst others. The Soviet delegation consisted of Central Asians, amongst whom there were no high-ranking officials. Jean Lautissier was the main WFDY representative at the conference.

Most of the participating delegates at the conference were non-communists. From India, there was a delegation of the youth of the Indian National Congress, and from Burma a delegation from the AFPFL youth. Both of these delegations reacted sharply to statements condemning "sham independence" in India and Burma, and left the conference in protest. Pro-Congress elements attacked a house where a reception was held for the Soviet delegation to the conference. Two Indian youth leaders, Sushil Mukhopadhyay and Bhabamadhav Ghosh, were killed in the attack.

== Mass rally ==
A mass rally, with around 30,000 participants, was held in connection with the conference. In the rally, a Chinese delegate carried aloft a blood-stained shirt, from a Chinese communist fighter who had been killed in battle.

== Analysis ==
The conference was held in the same month as the second congress of the Communist Party of India, which also took place in Calcutta. Some historians argue that these two events were utilized by the Cominform (then a newly founded body) to organize a large-scale armed communist rebellion across Asia. Sir Francis Low writes (in Struggle for Asia) that "[t]he signal for action was given by the so-called South-East Asian Youth Conference which met in Calcutta in 1948 and was in reality a gathering of international Communist agents. There issued from the meeting a programme for insurrection and civil war which was carried, with dire results, to all the countries of South-East Asia." Time magazine wrote in October 1948 that "[t]he new plan was devised last March. Communist delegates attended a 'Southeast Asia Youth Conference' in Calcutta. A planeload of experts from Moscow came to give them their orders. ... After Words, Deeds. The plan worked out at Calcutta called for simultaneous revolts in Burma and Malaya. Three months after the outbreak of the Malayan revolt, Indonesia's Communists were to strike. As coordination center for the drive a 26-man Soviet Legation, largest in Southeast Asia, was set up in Bangkok."

However, Bertil Lintner argues that there is no proof of any direct linkage between the conference as such and the initiations of armed insurgencies in different Asian countries. Ruth McVey states that whilst the conference was the first public meeting of Southeast Asian communists after the Soviet declaration of the two-camp theory (that the world was divided into two camps, imperialism and socialism, and that confrontation between the two was inevitable), Asian communists were already aware of the new line prior to the Calcutta meeting. The Communist Party of India had adopted the new line of confrontation in December 1947. Mari Olsen claims that it is unclear if the Calcutta conference would have been used to convey Soviet directives to Asian communists, as there were no senior Soviet representatives present.
