= Jagannath Sarkar (CPI politician) =

Indian politician

Personal details
- Born: 25 September 1919 Puri, Orissa, India
- Died: 8 April 2011 (aged 91) Patna
- Party: Communist Party of India

Jagannath Sarkar (25 September 1919 – 8 April 2011) was an Indian Communist leader, freedom fighter, and writer on social issues.

== Early life ==
Jagannath Sarkar was born to a Bengali family in Puri, Orissa, India, on 25 September 1919.

His father, Dr Akhilnath Sarkar, was a gynaecologist at the Prince of Wales Medical College (now the Patna Medical College and Hospital). The Bengali historian Sir Jadunath Sarkar was his uncle.

The young Sarkar grew up in the atmosphere of Bengal renaissance, with his family being inspired by Ram Mohan Roy, Swami Vivekananda and Rabindranath Tagore.

== Early political interests ==
One of the priests of the Ramakrishna Mission at Patna, which Sarkar frequented in his youth, introduced him to Marxist literature, which was then banned in British India.

Sarkar went on to study economics at Patna University, where he associated with the Freedom Movement and the nascent Communist Party in Bihar, and he became an activist among students and educated people. After joining the Communist Party, he moved to the working class areas of Bihar and then Jharkhand, were, in the 1940s and 1950s, he engaged in campaigns for miners' and colliery workers' rights.

His father (who had been awarded the honour of Rai Bahadur) was sympathetic to the cause of his son and his comrades, and he secretively provided resources for their revolutionary activities until his death.

== Later career ==
Sarkar was a leader in the Communist Party of India in Bihar in the 1950s and 1960s when it came to power in the state, and he railed against supporters of military dictatorship and ideology-less rule. Several land reforms in favour of landless labourers were achieved during this period.

Sarkar also wrote on a number of social issues, including secularism, left-wing extremism, tribal development, and socialist ideological issues in India, and he was patron and editor of the Hindi daily Janashakti for a time.

In the 1970s, Sarkar became a member of the Central Secretariat of the Communist Party of India and moved to Delhi. But at the age of 65, he decided to cease participation in active politics, wanting the younger generation to play a leadership role in progressive movements.

He was extensively quoted and written about by national and international academics, including Bipan Chandra and Paul Brass.

Sarkar died on 8 April 2011, in Patna.

== Writing ==
Many of Sarkar's writings are not easily traceable, but from what was available, an anthology was published as a book in 2010.

Entitled Many Streams, it is a collection of selected essays by Sarkar, with some reminiscences from his friends and colleagues. The book was released on 14 May 2010, in Patna by Prof Prabhat Patnaik of Jawaharlal Nehru University.

The preface to the book was written by Shaibal Gupta, Member Secretary of the Asian Development Research Institute, Patna.
