= Mohit Banerji =

Indian politician

Mohit Banerji (Mohit Bandopadhay; 1912–1961) was a pioneer of the Communist Party of India in West Bengal, India and translated several communist movement songs of Europe into Bengali. These include "Soviet Land" and "The Internationale" (both translated with the original score). The Bengali translation of "The Internationale" is now the Communist Party anthem in West Bengal.

== Early life ==
Mohit Banerji was born in Dhaka (now in Bangladesh) on 12 September 1912 and was the second son of Bankim Das Bandopadhay. Bandopadhay, a renowned professor of mathematics in Bengal, was at that time posted in Dhaka as the superintendent of Jagannath Hall and a professor at Dhaka University. Bandopadhay was later a teaching professor of mathematics at Presidency College, Calcutta and served as mentor to the internationally known Satyendra Nath Bose, M.L. Biswas and many other Indian scholars.

== Education and communist foundations ==
Banerji's formative years were spent in West Bengal, having been educated at Midnapore Collegiate School, followed by tertiary undergraduate study at the University of Calcutta. He travelled to London, England, to complete a degree in commerce at the London School of Economics, which he completed successfully in July 1940. During this time, Banerji joined the Indian Students Group Movement. This group movement was formed in support of Socialist (Marxist) ideology, to protest against colonial rule of India and counteract fascism. The Indian Students Group included future stalwarts of India and West Bengal such as Jyoti Basu, Bhupesh Gupta, Snehansu Kanta Acharya (former attorney general of West Bengal), Feroze Gandhi, V. K. Krishna Menon and many other famous figures of Indian politics.

== Marxist cultural movement involvement ==
Banerji returned to India in late 1940 with strong socio-communist ideals and joined the Communist Party of India. As a pioneering member of the party's Youth Cultural Institute (later Indian People's Theatre Association), he took responsibility in promoting Marxism through cultural activities to students, teachers, writers, professionals and other citizens. He was also a member of the "Soviet Suhrid Sangha" along with other party representatives such as Jyoti Basu, Hirendranath Mukherjee and others.

In driving the cultural movement aimed at the youth of the time, he translated several communist movement songs of Europe into Bengali. These include "Soviet Land" and "The Internationale" (both translated with the original score). The latter was subsequently adopted as the Communist Party anthem in West Bengal.

== Post party career ==
Banerji withdrew from the Communist Party around 1943, joined the Indian Air Force, and was commissioned as a squadron leader into the Air Force Accounts Branch. He was posted in various parts of India and achieved the commission of wing commander prior to his sudden demise in 1961.

== Personal life ==
Banerji was married to Uma Ganguly (Banerji) in August 1944. They had two daughters, Mitra and Madhabi.
