= S. G. Sardesai =

Indian politician

S.G. Sardesai

Member of Parliament, Rajya Sabha
- In office 1970–1976

Personal details
- Born: Shriniwas Ganesh Sardesai; 1907
- Died: 1996 (aged 88–89)
- Party: Communist Party of India

Shriniwas Ganesh Sardesai (1907–1996) was an Indian nationalist from Maharashtra and one of the communist leaders in India. He is author of the book Progress and conservatism in ancient India. He was the Central Executive Committee of Communist Party of India during the Indo-china conflict. He was member at Rajya Sabha from 1970 to 1976.

== Writings ==
- Kashmir; defence, democracy, secularism (1965)
- India's Path to Socialism (1966)
- India and the Russian Revolution (1967)
- For anti-imperialist unity democratic consolidation (1969)
- Fascist menace and democratic unity(1970)
- Shivaji : contours of a historica[l] evaluation (1974)
- Class struggle and caste conflict in rural areas (1979)
- National integration for democracy and socialism (1981)
- Marxism and the role of the working class in India (1982)
- Marxism and the Bhagvat Geeta (1982)
- The heritage we carry forward and the heritage we renounce (1984)
- Progress and conservatism in ancient India (1986)
- Marathi riyasata (1988)
- भारतीय तत्त्वज्ञान: वैचारिक आणि सामाजिक संघर्ष
