= Dhanwantri =

Indian politician

Comrade Dhanwantri (7 March 1902 – 13 July 1953) was a freedom fighter and one of the founder of Communist Party of India in Jammu and Kashmir. During the British Raj, he was arrested by the British authorities and jailed for an overall period of 17 years out of his total adult life of 34 years.

The Communist Party of India Jammu and Kashmir State headquarters, Dhanwantri Bhavan, is named in his honor.
