= National Federation of Indian Women =

Indian women's organisation

- Abbreviation: NFIW
- Formation: 4 June 1954 (72 years ago), Calcutta, India
- Type: Women Organisation
- Headquarters: 1002, Ansal Bhawan, 16, Kasturba Gandhi Marg, New Delhi - 110001
- General Secretary: Nisha Siddhu
- President: Syeda Hameed
- Affiliations: Women's International Democratic Federation (WIDF)
- Website: nfiw.wordpress.com

The National Federation of Indian Women is a women's organisation in India, the women's wing of the Communist Party of India. It was established on 4 June 1954 by several leaders from Mahila Atma Raksha Samiti including Aruna Asaf Ali.

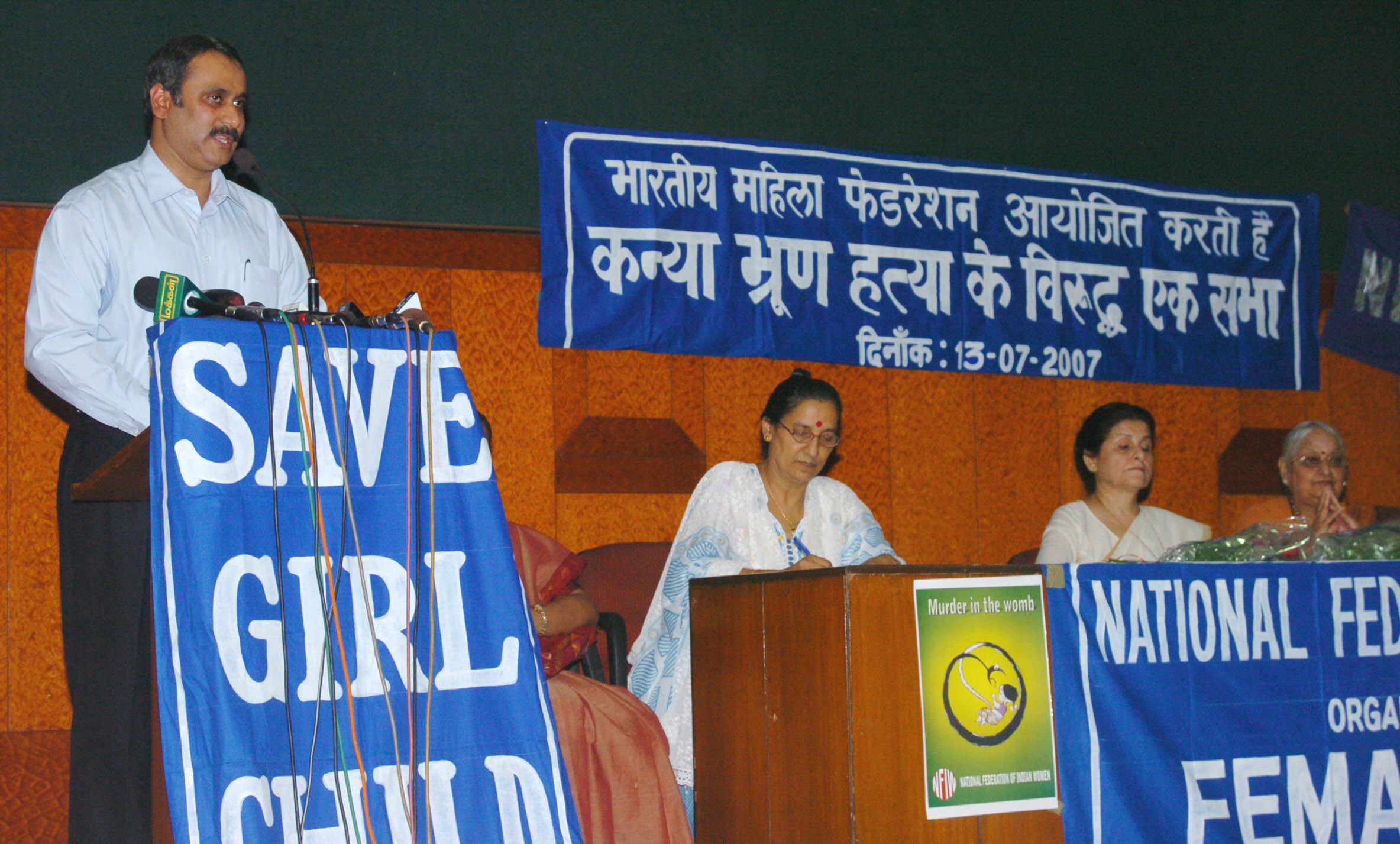
Union Minister for Health and Family Welfare Dr. Anbumani Ramadoss addresses a programme against female foeticide, organised by the National Federation of Indian Women, in New Delhi on 13 July 2007

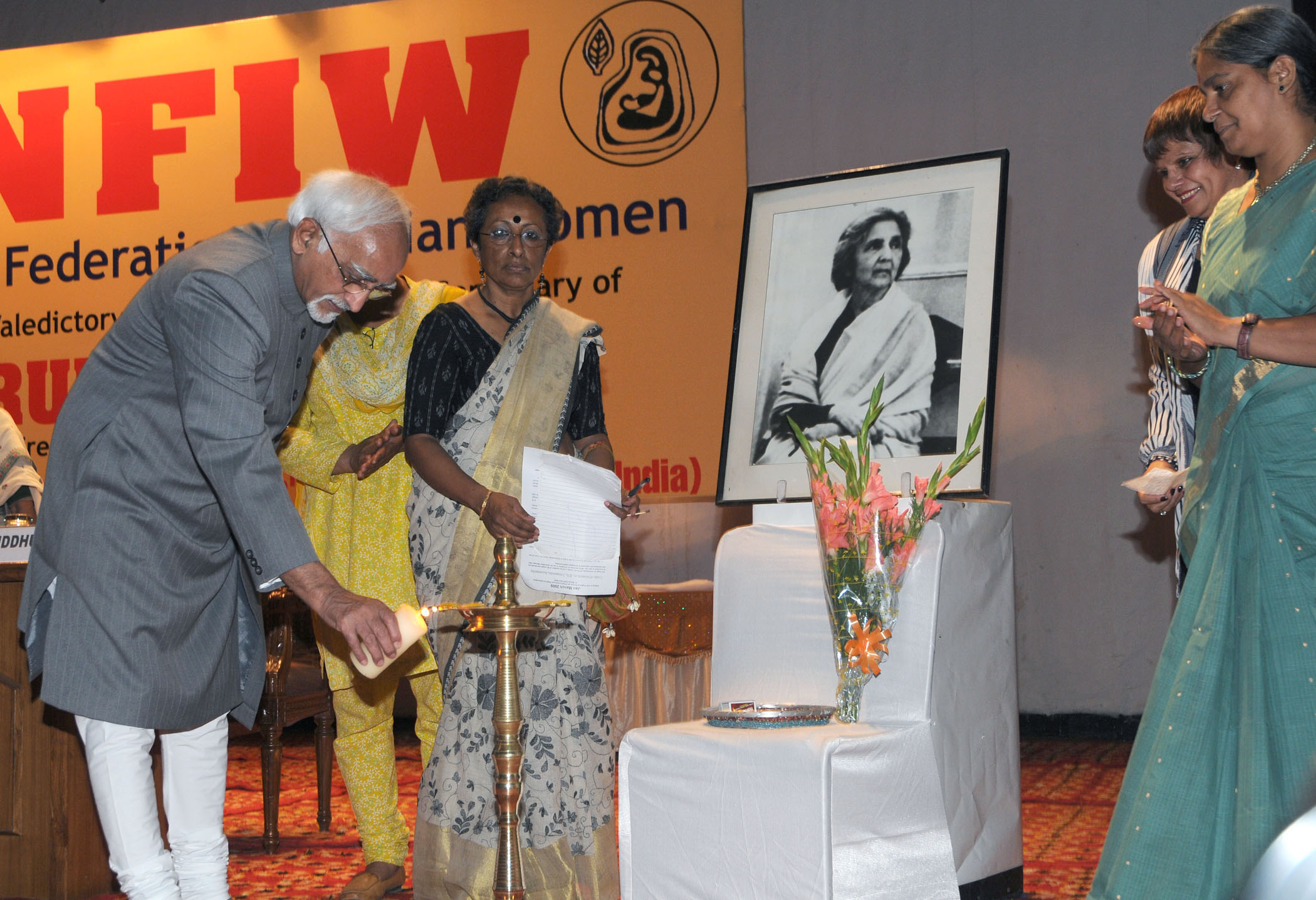
Mohd. Hamid Ansari lighting the lamp at the valedictory function of the birth centenary of late Smt. Aruna Asaf Ali, organized by the National Federation of Indian Women, in New Delhi on 16 July 2009

== History ==
The first Congress of the NFIW (Calcutta, 4 June 1954) was held against the backdrop of the Cold War and military pacts, lending a certain poignancy to its declaration of “unshakeable opposition to large scale armaments, weapons of mass destruction such as hydrogen bomb, atom bomb and bacteriological weapons.”

Inspired by a vision of women across the globe uniting against imperialism, poverty and disease, leading figures such as Vidya Munshi, Ela Reid, Hajrah Begum, Anna Mascarene, Renu Chakravartty, Tara Reddy, Shanta Deb and Anasuya Gyanchand participated in meetings of the Women's International Democratic Federation (WIDF), World Conference of Mothers (Lausanne, 1955), Afro-Asian Women's Conference (Cairo, 1961), the anniversary of the victory of Vietnam (Ho Chi Minh city, 1977), and so on.

From Vijaywada in Andhra Pradesh, in 1957, NFIW President Pushpamayee Bose issued a rousing appeal: “We, the women of the Federation declare that we do not want war, neither here nor anywhere in the world… We demand from the Big Powers not only stoppage of all nuclear tests but cessation of all wars for the world good - we ask them not to waste their men, money and brains on war preparation but use it for the well-being of their countries”.

Many women's organisations joined NFIW, united by the common goal of securing women's rights. At the founding conference in 1954, 39 organisations had already joined in, yielding a membership of nearly 1.3 lakh women from peasants, workers, tribals, dalits and refugees to professionals, artists and intellectuals. Constituent organisations included Mahila Atma Raksha Samiti (MARS, West Bengal), Bihar Mahila Samaj (Bihar), Punjab Lok Istri Sabha, Nari Mangal Samiti (Orissa), and Manipur Mahila Samiti.

== Presidents ==
1. Pushpamoyee Bose (1954–1957)
2. Anusuya Gyanchand (1957–1962)
3. Kapila Khandvala (1962–1967)
4. Aruna Asaf Ali (1967–1986)
5. Dr.Nirupama Rath (1986–1994)
6. Deena Pathak (1994–2002)
7. Dr.K. Saradamoni (2002–2008)
8. Aruna Roy (2008–2024)
9. Syeda Hameed (2024– )

== General Secretaries ==
1. Anusuya Gyan Chand (1954–1957)
2. Hajrah Begum (1954–1962)
3. Renu Chakravartty (1962–1970)
4. Vimla Farooqui (1970–1991)
5. Tara Reddy (1991–1994)
6. G. Sarla Devi (1994–1999)
7. Amarjeet Kaur (1999–2002)
8. Sehba Farooqui (2002–2005)
9. Annie Raja (2005–2024)
10. Nisha Sindhu (2024– )

== See also ==
- Krantikari Adivasi Mahila Sangathan
- Nari Mukti Sangh
