= Ajoy Ghosh =

Former General secretary of the Communist party of India

Ajoy Kumar Ghosh

General Secretary of Communist Party of India
- In office 1951–1962
- Preceded by: Chandra Rajeswara Rao
- Succeeded by: E. M. S. Namboodiripad

Personal details
- Born: 20 February 1909 Mihijam, Bengal Presidency, British India
- Died: 13 January 1962 (aged 52)
- Party: Communist Party of India
- Occupation: Politician; Freedom fighter

Ajoy Kumar Ghosh (20 February 1909 – 13 January 1962) was an Indian freedom fighter and prominent leader of the Communist Party of India. He was the general secretary of the Communist Party of India from 1954 to 1962.

== Early life ==
Ghosh was born in Mihijam village of Bardhaman district in the state of West Bengal, India. He went with his father Doctor Shachindranath Ghosh to Kanpur.

== Political life ==
In 1926, before entering Allahabad University, Ghosh met Bhagat Singh and Batukeshwar Dutt. He was a member of Hindustan Socialist Republican Association. He was arrested and later imprisoned after Lahore Conspiracy Case trial in 1929 but released due to lack of evidence. He was again arrested in 1931 and came into contact with Srinivas Sardeshai in prison. After release, he joined in the Communist Party of India. In 1934, he was elected to the Central Committee of the CPI and in 1936 he was elected to its Polit Bureau. In 1938, Ghosh became the member of the editorial board of the Party's mouthpiece, the National Front. He was the General Secretary of the Communist Party of India from 1951 till his death in 1962. He was leading the Communist Party of India during the China-India war in 1962. He was the prominent person in the centrist faction before the split of the Communist Party of India (Marxist) from the Communist Party of India.

Party political offices
Preceded by Chandra Rajeswara Rao	General Secretary of Communist Party of India; 1951–1954	Succeeded by E. M. S. Namboodiripad
