= Visalaandhra =

Indian newspaper

Visalaandhra విశాలాంధ్ర
- Front Page of Visalaandhra Daily with ads blurred out
- Type: Daily newspaper
- Format: Broadsheet
- Owner: Visalaandhra Vignana Samiti
- Editor: RV Rama Rao
- Founded: 1952; 74 years ago
- Political alignment: Communist
- Language: Telugu
- Headquarters: Vijayawada, Andhra Pradesh, India
- Circulation: 116287 (combined circulation of 5 editions) (as of 2014)
- Website: visalaandhra.com

Visalaandhra is an Indian Telugu-language daily newspaper established on 22 June 1952 in Vijayawada. The state Communist party of India decided to rename then daily Prajasakti to Visalaandhra (A combination of two words Visala meaning large or vast and Andhra meaning the region of Andhra Pradesh) with the slogan of having a single state for the Telugu speaking people. This newspaper was phenomenal in naming the newly formed state as Andhra Pradesh. It played a key role in opposing both the 1969 Separate Telangana movement and 1972 Jai Andhra movement. As of 2015, it is being published from 7 centres. The daily also celebrated its diamond jubilee year in 2012.

== History ==
Visalaandhra started as a first Telugu daily. The main aim of the daily was to unite all the Telugu speaking public who were disbursed because of the British rule. The historical goal of the newspaper thus was to have a state formed on linguistic basis. Communist publications started as Navasakti periodical on 15 December 1937 from Rajamahendri. This got closed down during World War II. Later, it was published as Swatantra Bharat - a secret magazine. In 1942, still later, it was published as a weekly with name Prajasakti vaarapatrika.
