= Communist Party of India =

Political party in India

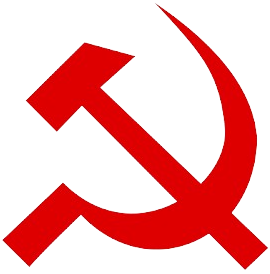
- Abbreviation: CPI
- General Secretary: D. Raja
- Rajya Sabha Leader: P. Santhosh Kumar
- Lok Sabha Leader: K. Subbarayan
- Founded: 26 December 1925 (100 years ago)
- Headquarters: Ajoy Bhavan; 15, Indrajit Gupta Marg, New Delhi, Delhi, India
- Newspaper: Newspapers: New Age; Mukti Sangharsh; Janayugom; Navayugom; Kalantar; Visalaandhra; Jana Sakthi; Praja Paksham; Nawan Zamana; Nua Dunia; Janashakti; Kembavuta; Yugantar; Kholao Thakhai; Tripurar Katha
- Student wing: All India Students' Federation
- Women's wing: National Federation of Indian Women
- Labour wing: All India Trade Union Congress; Bharatiya Khet Mazdoor Union
- Peasant's wing: All India Kisan Sabha
- Membership: ▼650,000 (2022)
- Ideology: Communism; Marxism–Leninism
- Political position: Left-wing
- International affiliation: IMCWP
- Colours: Red
- ECI status: State Party
- Alliance: Alliances: INDIA (National); LDF (Kerala); LF (Tripura); LF (West Bengal); MGB (Bihar); LF+ (West Bengal); LF (Tamil Nadu); SDF (Tripura); MVA (Maharashtra); INC+ (Telangana); MPSA (Manipur)
- Seats in Rajya Sabha: 2 / 245
- Seats in Lok Sabha: 2 / 543
- Seats in State Legislative Councils: 1 / 40
- Seats in State legislatures: 11 / 4,131 (Total) State Legislatures 8 / 140 (Kerala) 2 / 234 (Tamil Nadu) 1 / 119 (Telangana)
- Number of states and union territories in government: 1 / 31

Election symbol

Party flag

Website
- communistparty.in

The Communist Party of India (CPI) is a Marxist–Leninist political party in India. The CPI considers the 26 December 1925 Kanpur conference as its foundation date. Between 1946 and 1951, the CPI led militant struggles such as the peasant revolt in Telangana, organising guerrilla warfare against feudal lords. The CPI was the main opposition party in India during the 1950s to 1960s. In 1964, a split in the CPI led to the formation of the Communist Party of India (Marxist), which eventually emerged as the larger of the two parties. CPI supported the rule of Indira Gandhi, but later changed course and joined the left unity. CPI was part of the ruling United Front government from 1996 to 1998 and had two ministers under the Devegowda and Gujral ministries.

In 2025, the CPI had two members in the Lok Sabha and two members in the Rajya Sabha. In addition, it has 11 MLAs across three states and one in the MLC in Telangana. It is designated a state party by the Election Commission of India as of 2023 in Tamil Nadu, Kerala, and Manipur. As of September 2026, the CPI is part of the Left Democratic Front coalition that forms the Opposition in Kerala. In Tamil Nadu, it is a part of the Left Front, it provides confidence and supply to TVK-led Alliance, which is in power.

== Name ==
The CPI is officially known in Hindi as the Bhāratīya Kamyunisṭ Pārṭī (भारतीय कम्युनिस्ट पार्टी), or BhaKaPa (भाकपा).

== History ==
=== Formation ===
The Communist Party of India (CPI) was formed on 26 December 1925 at the first Party Conference in Kanpur, which was then known as Cawnpore. S. V. Ghate was the first General Secretary of the CPI. There were many communist groups formed by Indians with the help of foreigners in different parts of the world, a group formed in Tashkent, Uzbekistan made contacts with the Anushilan and Jugantar groups in Bengal, and small communist groups were formed in Bombay (led by Shripad Amrit Dange), Madras (led by Singaravelar), the United Provinces (led by Shaukat Usmani), Punjab, Sindh (led by Ghulam Hussain), Orissa (led by Bhagabati Charan Panigrahi) and Bengal (led by Muzaffar Ahmad).

The CPI's year of formation is disputed. The Communist Party of India (Marxist) (CPI(M)), which split from the CPI in 1964, considers 17 October 1920 to be the CPI's founding day. On that day, M. N. Roy, Evelyn Trent-Roy, Abani Mukherji, Rosa Fitingov, Mohd. Ali, Mohamad Shafiq, and M. P. T. Acharya met in Tashkent to form the communist movement in India. Neither the 1920 nor 1925 dates are considered significant by the Communist International, because the CPI had not adopted a party constitution on either occasion, which was one of the main prerequisites for membership in the international.

=== Involvement in independence struggle ===
During the 1920s and the early 1930s the party was poorly organised, and in practice there were several communist groups working with limited national co-ordination. The government banned all communist activity, which made the task of building a united party difficult. Between 1921 and 1924, there were three conspiracy trials against the communist movement: the Peshawar Conspiracy Cases, the Meerut Conspiracy Case, and the Kanpur Bolshevik Conspiracy Case. In the first three cases, Russian-trained muhajir communists were put on trial; however, the Kanpur trial had more political impact. On 17 March 1924, Dange, M. N. Roy, Ahmad, Nalini Gupta, Shaukat Usmani, Malayapuram Singaravelu, Ghulam Hussain, and R. C. Sharma were charged, in the Kanpur case. The specific pip charge was that they as communists were seeking "to deprive the King Emperor of his sovereignty of British India, by complete separation of India from Britain by a violent revolution." Pages of newspapers daily splashed sensational communist plans and people for the first time learned, on such a large scale, about communism and its doctrines and the aims of the Communist International in India.

Singaravelu Chettiar was released on account of illness. M. N. Roy was in Germany and R. C. Sharma in French Pondichéry, and therefore could not be arrested. Ghulam Hussain confessed that he had received money from the Russians in Kabul and was pardoned. Muzaffar Ahmad, Nalini Gupta, Shaukat Usmani and Dange were sentenced for various terms of imprisonment. This case was responsible for actively introducing communism to a larger Indian audience. Dange was released from prison in 1927. Rahul Dev Pal was a prominent communist leader.

On 26 December 1925, a communist conference was organised in Kanpur. Government authorities estimated that 500 people took part in the conference. The conference was convened by a man called Satya Bhakta. At the conference Satyabhakta argued for a national communism and against subordination under the Comintern. Being outvoted by the other delegates, Satyabhakta left the conference venue in protest. The conference adopted the name 'Communist Party of India'. Groups such as Labour Kisan Party of Hindustan (LKPH) dissolved into the CPI. The émigré CPI, which probably had little organic character anyway, was effectively substituted by the organisation now operating inside India. Soon after the 1926 conference of the Workers and Peasants Party (WPP) of Bengal, the underground CPI directed its members to join the provincial WPPs. All open communist activities were carried out through Workers and Peasants parties.

The sixth congress of the Communist International met in 1928. In 1927 the Kuomintang had turned on the Chinese communists, which led to a review of the policy on forming alliances with the national bourgeoisie in the colonial countries. The Colonial theses of the sixth Comintern congress called upon the Indian communists to combat the "national-reformist leaders" and to "unmask the national reformism of the Indian National Congress and oppose all phrases of the Swarajists, Gandhists, etc. about passive resistance". The congress did, however, differentiate between the character of the Chinese Kuomintang and the Indian Swaraj Party, considering the latter as neither a reliable ally nor a direct enemy. The congress called on the Indian communists to use the contradictions between the national bourgeoisie and the British imperialists. The congress also denounced the WPP. The Tenth Plenum of the executive committee of the Communist International, 3–19 July 1929, directed the Indian communists to break with WPP. When the communists deserted it, the WPP fell apart.

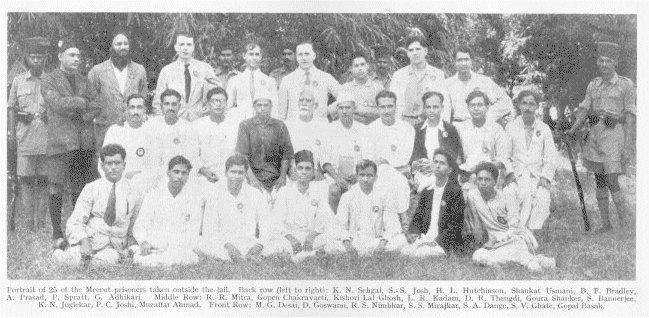
Portrait of 25 of the Meerut prisoners taken outside the jail. Back row (left to right): K. N. Sehgal, S. S. Josh, H. L. Hutchinson, Shaukat Usmani, B. F. Bradley, A. Prasad, P. Spratt, G. Adhikari. Middle row: R. R. Mitra, Gopen Chakravarti, Kishori Lal Ghosh, L. R. Kadam, D. R. Thengdi, Goura Shanker, S. Bannerjee, K. N. Joglekar, P. C. Joshi, Muzaffar Ahmad. Front row: M. G. Desai, D. Goswami, R. S. Nimbkar, S. S. Mirajkar, S. A. Dange, S. V. Ghate, Gopal Basak.

On 20 March 1929, arrests against the WPP, CPI and other labour leaders were made in several parts of India, in what became known as the Meerut Conspiracy Case. The communist leadership was now put behind bars. The trial proceedings were to last for four years. As of 1934, the main centres of activity of CPI were Bombay, Calcutta and Punjab. The party had also begun extending its activities to Madras. A group of Andhra and Tamil students, amongst them Puchalapalli Sundarayya, were recruited to the CPI by Amir Hyder Khan. The party was reorganised in 1933, after the communist leaders from the Meerut trials were released. A central committee of the party was set up. In 1934, the party was accepted as the Indian section of the Communist International.

When Indian left-wing elements formed the Congress Socialist Party in 1934, the CPI branded it as social fascist. The League Against Gandhism, initially known as the Gandhi Boycott Committee, was a political organisation in Calcutta, founded by the underground Communist Party of India and others to launch militant anti-Imperialist activities. The group took the name League Against Gandhism in 1934. In connection with the change of policy of the Comintern toward popular front politics, the Indian communists changed their relation to the Indian National Congress. The communists joined the Congress Socialist Party, which worked as the left wing of Congress. Through joining CSP, the CPI accepted the CSP demand for a Constituent Assembly, which it had denounced two years before. The CPI however analysed that the demand for a Constituent Assembly would not be a substitute for soviets.

In July 1937, a clandestine meeting was held at Calicut. Five persons were present at the meeting, P. Krishna Pillai, K. Damodaran, E. M. S. Namboodiripad, N. C. Sekhar and S.V. Ghate. The first four were members of the CSP in Kerala. The CPI in Kerala was formed on 31 December 1939 with the Pinarayi Conference. The latter, Ghate, was a CPI Central Committee member, who had arrived from Madras. Contacts between the CSP in Kerala and the CPI had begun in 1935, when P. Sundarayya (CC member of CPI, based in Madras at the time) met with E. M. S. Namboodiripad and Krishna Pillai. Sundarayya and Ghate visited Kerala at several times and met with the CSP leaders there. The contacts were facilitated through the national meetings of the Congress, CSP and All India Kisan Sabha.

In 1936–1937, the cooperation between socialists and communists reached its peak. At the 2nd congress of the CSP, held in Meerut in January 1936, a thesis was adopted which declared that there was a need to build 'a united Indian Socialist Party based on Marxism-Leninism'. At the 3rd CSP congress, held in Faizpur, several communists were included into the CSP National Executive Committee. Two communists, E. M. S. Namboodiripad and Z. A. Ahmed, became All India joint secretaries of CSP. The CPI also had two other members inside the CSP executive. On the occasion of the 1940 Ramgarh Congress Conference, CPI released a declaration called Proletarian Path. This declaration sought to use the weakened state of the British Empire in the time of war and gave a call for general strike, no-tax, no-rent policies and mobilising for an armed revolutionary uprising. The National Executive of the CSP assembled at Ramgarh took a decision that all communists were expelled from CSP.

In July 1942, the CPI was legalised, as a result of Britain and the Soviet Union becoming allies against Nazi Germany. Communists strengthened their control over the All India Trade Union Congress. At the same time, communists were politically cornered for their opposition to the Quit India Movement. CPI contested the Provincial Legislative Assembly elections of 1946 on its own. It had candidates in 108 out of 1585 seats, winning in eight seats. In total, the CPI vote counted 666,723, which should be seen with the backdrop that 86% of the adult population of India lacked voting rights. The party had contested three seats in Bengal, and won all of them. One CPI candidate, Somnath Lahiri, was elected to the Constituent Assembly. The Communist Party of India opposed the partition of India and did not participate in the Independence Day celebrations of 15 August 1947 in protest at the division of the country.

=== After independence ===
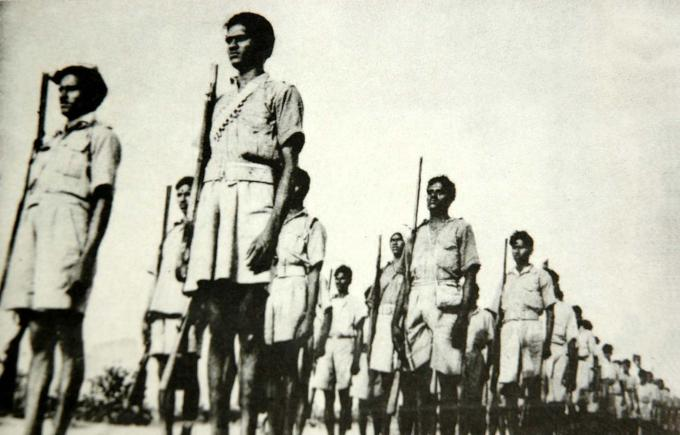
The Telangana armed struggle (1946–1952), was a peasant rebellion by communists against the feudal lords of the Telangana region in the princely state of Hyderabad.

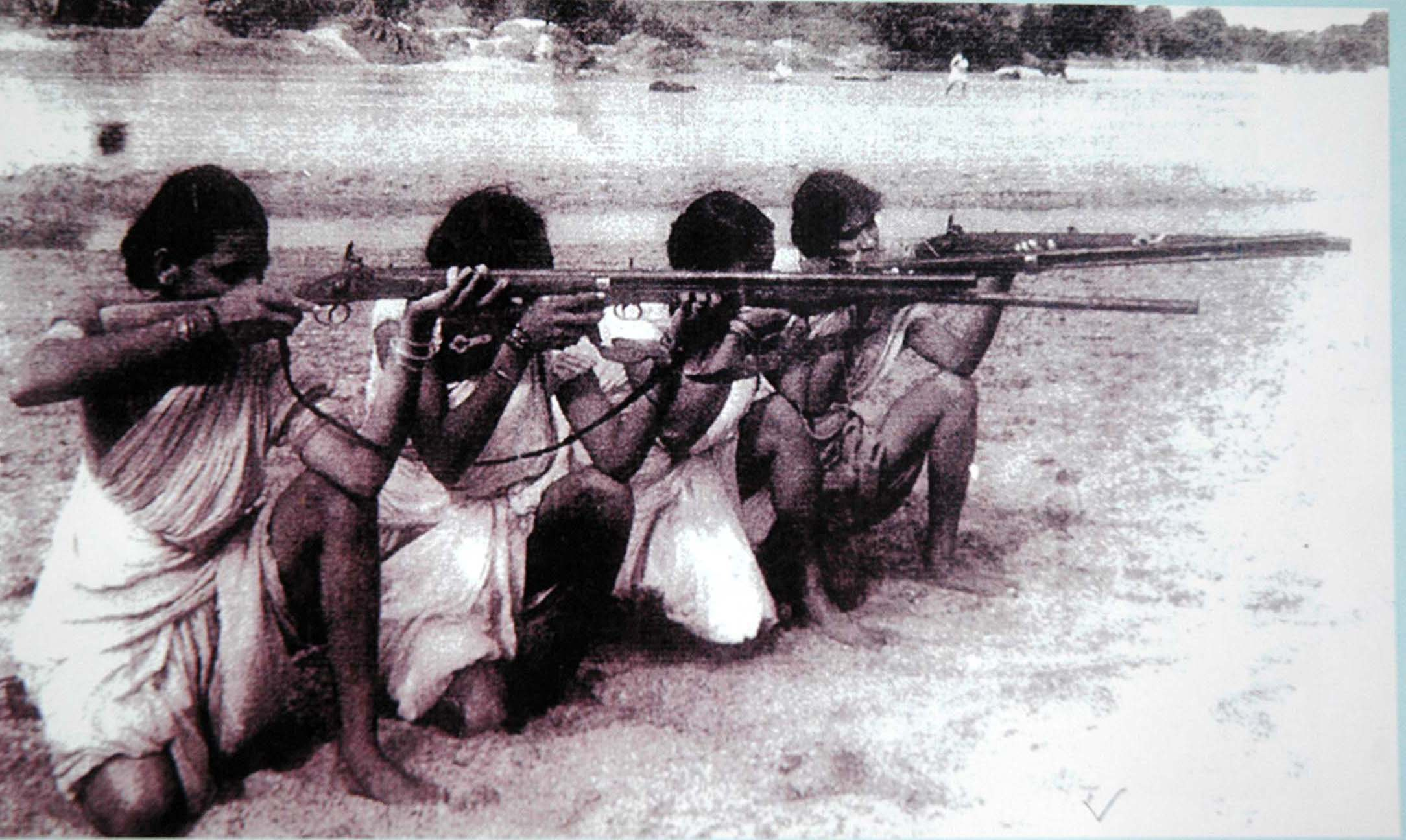
Guerrillas of the Telangana armed struggle

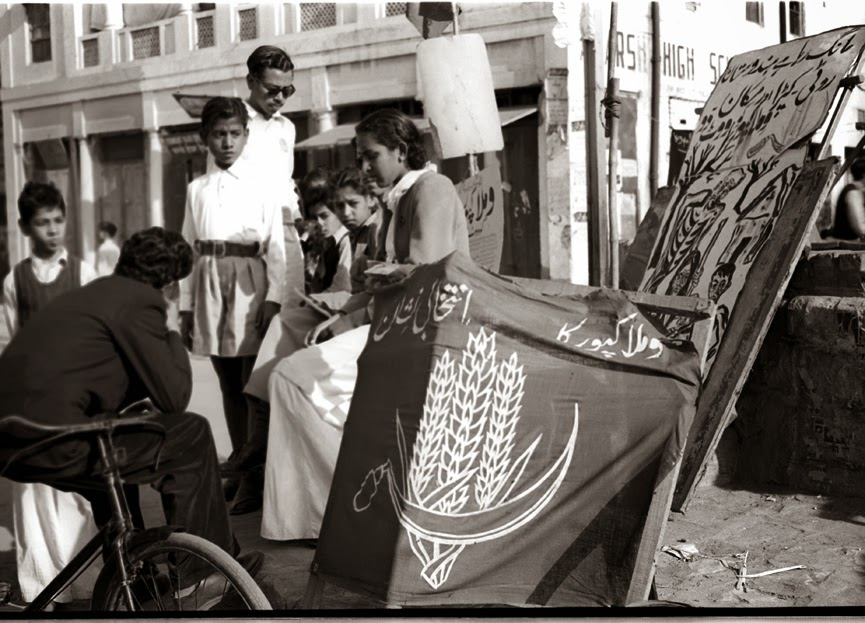
CPI election campaign in Karol Bagh, Delhi, for the 1952 Indian general election

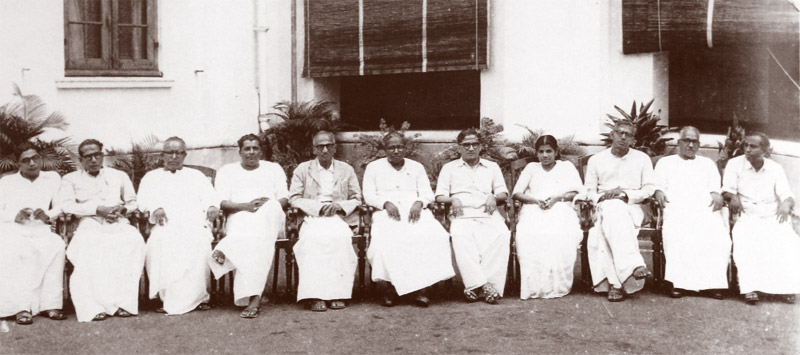
First Council of Ministers, First CPI Ministry in Kerala

During the period around and directly following Independence in 1947, the internal situation in the party was chaotic. The party shifted rapidly between left-wing and right-wing positions. In February 1948, at the 2nd Party Congress in Calcutta, B. T. Ranadive (BTR) was elected General Secretary of the party. The conference adopted the "Programme of Democratic Revolution", which included the first mention of struggle against caste injustice in a CPI document.

In several areas the party led armed struggles against a series of local monarchs that were reluctant to give up their power. Such insurgencies took place in Tripura, Telangana and Kerala. The most important rebellion took place in Telangana, against the Nizam of Hyderabad. The communists built up a people's army and militia and controlled an area with a population of three million. The rebellion was brutally crushed and the party abandoned the policy of armed struggle. BTR was deposed and denounced as a left adventurist. In Manipur, the party became a force to reckon with through the agrarian struggles led by Jananeta Irawat Singh. Singh had joined CPI in 1946. At the 1951 party congress, the main slogan was changed from People's Democracy to National Democracy.

A Communist Party was founded in Bihar in 1939. Post independence, the Communist Party achieved success in Bihar (Bihar and Jharkhand). The Communist Party conducted movements for land reform, and the trade union movement was at its peak in Bihar in the 1960s–1980s. The achievements of communists in Bihar placed the communists in the forefront of the left movement in India. Bihar produced some of the most well-known leaders like Kishan leaders Sahajanand Saraswati and Karyanand Sharma, intellectuals like Jagannath Sarkar, Yogendra Sharma, and Indradeep Sinha, mass leaders like Chandrasekhar Singh and Sunil Mukherjee, trade union leaders like Kedar Das and others. In the Mithila region of Bihar, Bhogendra Jha led the fight against the Mahants and Zamindars. He later went on to win the Parliamentary elections and was MP for seven terms.

In the early 1950s, young communist leadership was uniting textile workers, bank employees and unorganised sector workers to ensure mass support in north India. National leaders like Shripad Amrit Dange, Chandra Rajeswara Rao, and P. K. Vasudevan Nair were encouraging them and supporting the idea despite their differences on the execution. Firebrand Communist leaders like Homi F. Daji, Guru Radha Kishan, H. L. Parwana, Sarjoo Pandey, Darshan Singh Canadian and Avtaar Singh Malhotra were emerging between the masses and the working class in particular. This was the first leadership of communists that was very close to the masses and people consider them champions of the cause of the workers and the poor. In 1952, CPI became the first leading opposition party in the first Lok Sabha, while the Indian National Congress was in power.

In the 1952 Travancore-Cochin Legislative Assembly election, the Communist Party was banned, so it couldn't take part in the election process. In the general elections in 1957, the CPI emerged as the largest opposition party. In 1957, the CPI won the state elections in Kerala. This was the first time that an opposition party won control over an Indian state. E. M. S. Namboodiripad became Chief Minister. At the 1957 international meeting of Communist parties in Moscow, the Chinese Communist Party directed criticism at the CPI for having formed a ministry in Kerala.

The CPI was involved in the Liberation of Dadra and Nagar Haveli. Along with its units in Bombay, Maharashtra, and Gujarat, the party decided to begin armed operations in the area in July 1954. Both Dadra and Nagar Haveli were liberated by the beginning of August. Communist leaders like Narayan Palekar, Parulekar, Vaz, Rodriguez, Cunha, and others emerged as the Communist leaders of the movement. Thereafter, the struggle to liberate Daman and Diu was begun by the Communist Party in Gujarat and other forces.

The countrywide Goa Satyagraha movement of 1955–1956 was a significant event in the history of the Indian freedom struggle, in which the communists played a major role. The CPI sent groups of satyahrahis from mid-1955 onward to the borders of and into Goa. Many were killed, and many more were arrested and sent to jails inside Goa and inhumanely treated. Many others were even sent to jails in Portugal and brutally tortured. The satyagraha movement was led and conducted by a joint committee known as Goa Vimochan Sahayak Samiti. Dange, Senapati Bapat, S. G. Sardesai, Nana Patil and several others were among the leaders of the committee. Satyagraha began on 10 May 1955, and soon became a countrywide movement.

Ideological differences led to the split in the party in 1964 when two different party conferences were held, one of CPI and one of the Communist Party of India (Marxist). The impacts of the Sino-Soviet split contributed to this party split. During the period between 1970 and 1977, the CPI was allied with the Congress party. In Kerala, they formed a government together with Congress as part of a coalition known as the United Front, with the CPI-leader C. Achutha Menon as Chief Minister. This government continued governing throughout the emergency period and was responsible for the many acts of repression throughout the period carried out against political opponents in the guise of fighting naxals, manifesting most infamously in the Rajan case. The United Front government also used this opportunity to pursue class struggle by punishing those from the managerial classes, money lenders, bosses with anti-labour stances, ration shopkeepers and truckers engaged in black marketing, under stringent provisions of MISA and DIR.

In the 1980s, the CPI opposed the Khalistan movement in Punjab. In 1986, the CPI's leader in Punjab and MLA in the Punjabi legislature Darshan Singh Canadian was assassinated by Sikh extremists. Altogether about 200 communist leaders out of which most were Sikhs were killed by Sikh extremists in Punjab.

== Present situation ==
Left parties' regional control: State which had chief ministers from both the CPI(M) and the CPI. State/s which had a chief ministers from the CPI(M). States which have Governments of coalition of parties including Left parties like CPI(M), CPI, CPI(ML)L and AIFB. States which did not have/had a chief minister from the CPI(M) or the CPI.

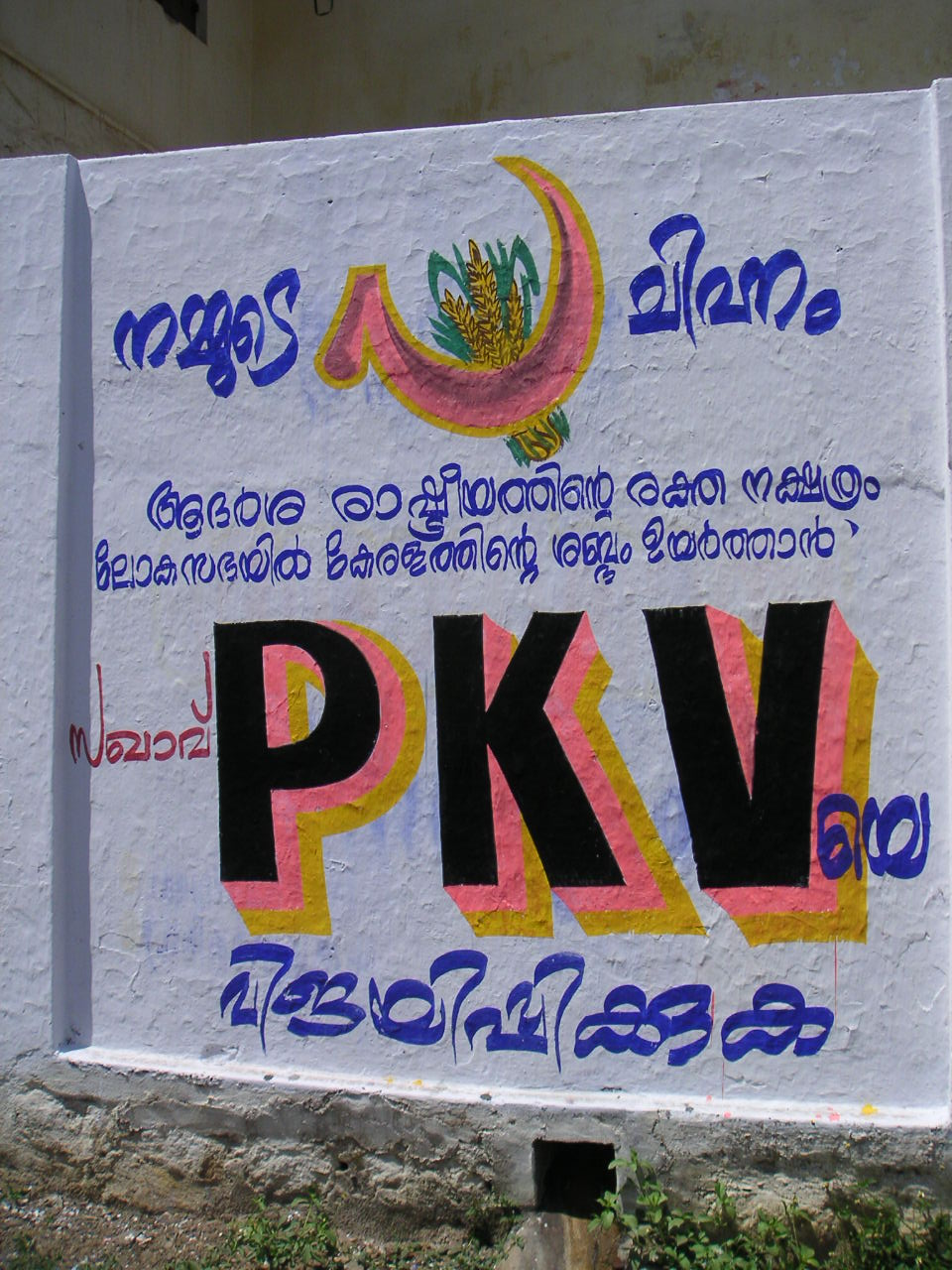
Mural in Thiruvananthapuram

The CPI was recognised by the Election Commission of India as a national party. Until 2022, CPI happened to be the only national political party from India to have contested all the general elections using the same electoral symbol. Owing to a massive defeat in 2019 Indian general election where the party saw its tally reduced to two MPs, the Election Commission of India sent a letter to CPI asking for reasons why its national party status should not be revoked. Due to repeated poor performances in elections, the Election Commission of India withdrew its national party status on 10 April 2023.

On the national level, they supported the Indian National Congress-led United Progressive Alliance government along with other parliamentary Left parties, but without taking part in it. Upon attaining power in May 2004, the United Progressive Alliance formulated a programme of action known as the Common Minimum Programme. The Left bases its support to the UPA on strict adherence to it. Provisions of the CMP mentioned to discontinue disinvestment, massive social sector outlays and an independent foreign policy. On 8 July 2008, the General Secretary of the CPI(M), Prakash Karat, announced that the Left was withdrawing its support over the decision by the government to go ahead with the United States-India Peaceful Atomic Energy Cooperation Act. The Left parties combination had been a staunch advocate of not proceeding with this deal citing national interests.

In West Bengal, the CPI participates in the Left Front. It also participated in the state government in Manipur. In Kerala, the party is part of Left Democratic Front. In Tripura the party is a partner of the Left Front, which governed the state until 2018. In Tamil Nadu it is part of the Secular Progressive Alliance and in Bihar it is the part of Mahagathbandhan. It is involved in the Left Democratic Front in Maharashtra. In February 2022, CPI and Congress formed an alliance in Manipur named the Manipur Progressive Secular Alliance. The current general secretary of CPI is D. Raja.

== Presence in states ==
As of 2026, the CPI is a part of the opposition in Kerala. In Tamil Nadu, it is giving outside support to TVK led government. The Left Front governed West Bengal for 34 years (1977–2011) and Tripura for 25 years (1993–2018)

Seats won by CPI in state legislative assemblies
State legislative assembly	Last election	Contested seats	Seats won	Alliance	Result	Ref.
Kerala Legislative Assembly	2026	24	8 / 140	Left Democratic Front	Opposition	
Tamil Nadu Legislative Assembly	2026	5	2 / 234	Left Front	Outside Support and Supply	
Telangana Legislative Assembly	2023	1	1 / 119	INC+	Government	

== List of members of parliament ==
=== List of Rajya Sabha (Upper House) members ===
No.	Name	State	Date of appointment	Date of retirement
1	P. P. Suneer	Kerala	2 July 2024	1 July 2030
2	P. Sandosh Kumar	Kerala	4 April 2022	3 April 2028

=== List of Lok Sabha (Lower House) members ===
No.	Name	Constituency	State
1	K. Subbarayan	Tiruppur	Tamil Nadu
2	Selvaraj V	Nagapattinam	Tamil Nadu

== Leadership ==
The 24th Party Congress of the Communist Party of India was held from 2025 September 21 to 25 in Chandigarh

=== General Secretary ===
- D. Raja

=== National Secretariat ===
Name	Photo
D. Raja	
Amarjeet Kaur	
Bhalchandra Kango	
Rama Krushna Panda	
Annie Raja	
Girish Chandra Sharma	
K. Prakash Babu	
P. Santhosh Kumar	
Palla Venkata Reddy	
Sanjay Kumar	

K. Ramakrishna will be an invitee to the national secretariat. Pallab Sengupta, President of the World Peace Council and in charge of the CPI International Department for several years, will be a permanent invitee to all higher bodies of the party.

=== State Secretaries ===
State	State Secretary
Andaman and Nicobar Islands	TBD
Andhra Pradesh	Gujjula Eshwarayya
Assam	Kanak Gogoi
Bihar	Ram Naresh Pandey
Delhi	Dinesh Varshney
Chhattisgarh	K. Saji
Goa	Christopher Fonseca
Gujarat	Ramsagar Singh Parihar
Haryana	Dariyav Singh Kashyap
Himachal Pradesh	Bhag Singh Chaudhary
Jammu and Kashmir	G. M. Mizrab
Jharkhand	Mahendra Pathak
Karnataka	Saathi Sundaresh
Kerala	Binoy Viswam
Madhya Pradesh	Shailendra Shaili
Maharashtra	Subhash Lande
Manipur	Naba Chandra
Meghalaya	Samudra Gupta
Nagaland	M. M. Thromwa Konyak
Odisha	Prasanta Mishra
Punjab	Bant Singh Brar
Puducherry	A. M. Saleem
Rajasthan	Narendra Acharya
Tamil Nadu	M. Veerapandian
Telangana	Kunamneni Sambasiva Rao
Tripura	Milan Baidya
Uttarakhand	Jagdish Kuliyal
Uttar Pradesh	Arvind Raj Swarup
West Bengal	Swapan Banerjee

== List of general secretaries and chairperson ==
Article XXXII of the party constitution says:

"The tenure of the General Secretary and Deputy General Secretary, if any, and State Secretaries is limited to two consecutive terms—a term being of not less than two years. In exceptional cases, the unit concerned may decide by three-fourth majority through secret ballot to allow two more terms. In case such a motion is adopted that comrade also can contest in the election along with other candidates. As regards the tenure of the office-bearers at district and lower levels, the state councils will frame rules where necessary."

General secretaries and chairmen
Number	Photo	Name	Tenure
1st		Sachchidanand Vishnu Ghate	1925–1933
2nd		Gangadhar Adhikari	1933–1935
3rd		Puran Chand Joshi	1936–1948
4th		B. T. Ranadive	1948–1950
5th		Chandra Rajeswara Rao	1950–1951
6th		Ajoy Ghosh	1951–1962
Chairperson		Shripad Amrit Dange	1962–1981
7th		E. M. S. Namboodiripad	1962–1964
(-)		Chandra Rajeswara Rao	1964–1990
8th		Indrajit Gupta	1990–1996
9th		Ardhendu Bhushan Bardhan	1996–2012
10th		Suravaram Sudhakar Reddy	2012–2019
11th		D. Raja	Since 2019 (incumbent)

== Party congress ==
Party congresses
Party congress	Year	Place
Founding conference	1925 December 25–28	Cawnpore (Kanpur)
1st	23 May – 1 June 1943	Bombay
2nd	28 February – 6 March 1948	Calcutta (Kolkata)
3rd	27 December 1953 – 4 January 1954	Madurai
4th	19–29 April 1956	Palghat
5th	6–13 April 1958	Amritsar
6th	7–16 April 1961	Vijayawada
7th	13–23 December 1964	Bombay
8th	7–15 February 1968	Patna
9th	3–10 October 1971	Cochin (Kochi)
10th	27 January – 2 February 1975	Vijayawada
11th	31 March – 7 April 1978	Bathinda
12th	22–28 March 1982	Varanasi
13th	2–17 March 1986	Patna
14th	6–12 March 1989	Calcutta
15th	10–16 April 1992	Hyderabad
16th	7–11 October 1995	Delhi
17th	14–19 September 1998	Chennai
18th	26–31 March 2002	Thiruvananthapuram
19th	29 March – 3 April 2005	Chandigarh
20th	23–27 March 2008	Hyderabad
21st	27–31 March 2012	Patna
22nd	25–29 March 2015	Puducherry
23rd	25–29 April 2018	Kollam
24th	14–18 October 2022	Vijayawada
25th	21–25 September 2025	Chandigarh

== Principal mass organisations ==
- All India Trade Union Congress (AITUC)
- All India Students Federation (AISF)
- All India Youth Federation (AIYF)
- National Federation of Indian Women (NFIW)
- All India Kisan Sabha (AIKS) – peasants' organisation
- Bharatiya Khet Mazdoor Union (BKMU) – agricultural workers organisation
- Indian People's Theatre Association (IPTA) – cultural wing
- All India State Government Employees Confederation (state government employees)
- Indian Society for Cultural Co-operation and Friendship (ISCUF)
- All India Peace and Solidarity Organisation (AIPSO)
- Progressive Writers' Association (PWA)
- All India Adivasi Mahasabha (tribal wing)
- All India Dalit Rights Movement (AIDRM)
- Tamil Nadu Oppressed People's Movement
- People's Service Corps
- Ganamukti Parishad

In Tripura, the Ganamukti Parishad is a mass organisation amongst the state's Tripuri people.

== List of chief ministers ==
Chief ministers
Photo	Name	Tenure	State
	E. M. S. Namboodiripad	1957–1959	Kerala
	C. Achutha Menon	1969–1970; 1970–1977	Kerala
	P. K. Vasudevan Nair	1978–1979	Kerala

== Notable leaders ==
- Abdul Sattar Ranjoor – Founding state secretary of the CPI in Jammu and Kashmir
- Ajoy Ghosh – Former general secretary of CPI, freedom fighter
- Amarjeet Kaur – General Secretary of the AITUC and CPI National Secretary
- Annabhau Sathe – Samyukta Maharashtra movement leader
- Annie Raja – General Secretary of NFIW and National Executive Member of CPI
- Ardhendu Bhushan Bardhan – Former general secretary
- Aruna Asaf Ali – Freedom fighter
- Binoy Viswam – Former Member of Rajya Sabha, former minister in the Government of Kerala and current State Secretary of CPI Kerala State Committee
- Bhan Singh Bhaura – Parliamentarian from Punjab and Founding President of Khet Mazdoor Sabha
- Bhargavi Thankappan – Parliamentarian
- Bhupesh Gupta – Parliamentarian
- C. Achutha Menon – Finance minister in first Kerala ministry and former chief minister of Kerala
- Chandra Rajeswara Rao – former general secretary, Telangana freedom fighter
- Chaturanan Mishra – parliamentarian and former Central Minister of India
- C. K. Chandrappan – Parliamentarian and former CPI Kerala State Secretary
- Dhanwantri – Founding member of the CPI in Jammu and Kashmir
- Darshan Singh Canadian – Trade unionist, fight against Khalistan movement
- D. Pandian – Parliamentarian and former Tamil Nadu state secretary
- D. Raja – Parliamentarian and General secretary of the party
- E. Chandrasekharan Nair – Senior leader and former Minister in the Government of Kerala
- Geeta Mukherjee – Parliamentarian and Former Vice President of National Federation of Indian Women
- Gopal Mukund Huddar – Anti-colonial activist and anti-fascist soldier
- Govind Pansare – Prominent activist and lawyer
- Gurudas Dasgupta – Parliamentarian and former General Secretary of the AITUC and BKMU
- Hajrah Begum – Former general secretary of NFIW
- Hasrat Mohani – Founding member
- Hijam Irabot – Founding leader of CPI in Manipur
- Hirendranath Mukherjee – Parliamentarian, was awarded the Padma Bhushan in 1990 and Padma Vibhushan in 1991 by the President of India for his lifelong services
- Ila Mitra – Peasant movement leader from West Bengal
- Indrajit Gupta – Parliamentarian, former general secretary and a former central minister
- Jagannath Sarkar – former national secretary, freedom fighter, builder of communist movement in Bihar and Jharkhand
- Junu Das – Prominent leader of CPI
- Kalpana Datta – freedom fighter
- Kalyan Roy – Parliamentarian
- Kanam Rajendran – Former Kerala state secretary of the party
- K.N. Joglekar – founding member of CPI
- Kunwar Mohammad Ashraf – Marxist historian
- Meghraj Tawar – Former Rajasthan MLA and leader of the CPI
- M. Kalyanasundaram – Parliamentarian
- M. N. Govindan Nair – Kerala state secretary during the first communist ministry and a freedom fighter
- Mohit Banerji – Prominent Leader
- Nallakannu – former Tamil Nadu state secretary of the party
- N. E. Balaram – Founding leader of the communist movement in Kerala, India
- Parvathi Krishnan – Parliamentarian
- P. Krishna Pillai – Founder and First secretary of CPI in Kerala
- P. K. Vasudevan Nair – Former Chief minister of Kerala, Former AISF general secretary, Former AIYF general secretary
- Puran Chand Joshi – first general secretary of the Communist Party of India
- Ramendra Kumar – Former Parliamentarian, national executive member, national president AITUC
- Rosamma Punnoose – Freedom Fighter
- R. Sugathan – Prominent trade unionist, mass leader and member of Kerala Legislative Assembly
- Sachchidanand Vishnu Ghate – First general secretary of CPI, freedom fighter
- Satyapal Dang – Former legislator of Punjab Legislative Assembly, representing the CPI for four terms, and a minister of Food and Civil Supplies in the United Front ministry led by Justice Gurnam Singh, and a Padma Bhushan awardee.
- S. S. Mirajkar – Trade unionist, freedom fighter
- Suhasini Chattopadhyay – founding CPI member
- Suravaram Sudhakar Reddy – former general secretary of the party and parliamentarian
- Shripad Amrit Dange – Freedom fighter and former chairman of the party
- Thoppil Bhasi – Writer, film director and parliamentarian
- T. V. Thomas – Minister in the first Kerala ministry
- Veliyam Bharghavan – Parliamentarian and former CPI Kerala state secretary
- Vidya Munshi – Journalist
- Vimla Dang – leader of CPI
- V. V. Raghavan – CPI Central Secretariat Member, two-time Lok Sabha member from Thrissur, Rajya Sabha member, former Agriculture Minister of Kerala

== General election results ==
=== Lok Sabha ===
Year	Legislature	Total Lok Sabha constituencies	Seats won / Seats Contested	Change in seats	Total Votes	Percentage of votes	Change in vote %	Reference
1951–52	1st Lok Sabha	489	16 / 49	New	3,487,401	3.29%	New	
1957	2nd Lok Sabha	494	27 / 110	▲11	10,754,075	8.92%	▲5.63%	
1962	3rd Lok Sabha	494	29 / 137	▲2	11,450,037	9.94%	▲1.02%	
1967	4th Lok Sabha	520	23 / 109	▼6	7,458,396	5.11%	▼4.83%	
1971	5th Lok Sabha	518	23 / 87	Steady	6,933,627	4.73%	▼0.38%	
1977	6th Lok Sabha	542	7 / 91	▼16	5,322,088	2.82%	▼1.91%	
1980	7th Lok Sabha	529(542*)	10 / 47	▲3	4,927,342	2.49%	▼0.33%	
1984	8th Lok Sabha	541	6 / 61	▼4	6,363,430	2.71%	▲0.22%	
1989	9th Lok Sabha	529	12 / 50	▲6	7,734,697	2.57%	▼0.14%	
1991	10th Lok Sabha	534	14 / 42	▲2	6,851,114	2.49%	▼0.08%	
1996	11th Lok Sabha	543	12 / 43	▼2	6,582,263	1.97%	▼0.52%	
1998	12th Lok Sabha	543	9 / 58	▼3	6,429,569	1.75%	▼0.22%	
1999	13th Lok Sabha	543	4 / 54	▼5	5,395,119	1.48%	▼0.27%	
2004	14th Lok Sabha	543	10 / 34	▲6	5,484,111	1.41%	▼0.07%	
2009	15th Lok Sabha	543	4 / 56	▼6	5,951,888	1.43%	▲0.02%	
2014	16th Lok Sabha	543	1 / 67	▼3	4,327,460	0.79%	▼0.64%	
2019	17th Lok Sabha	543	2 / 49	▲1	3,576,184	0.59%	▼0.20%	
2024	18th Lok Sabha	543	2 / 30	Steady	3,132,683	0.49%	▼0.10%	

All time-CPI Lok Sabha seat count

== State Legislative assembly results ==
Year	State	Total assembly seats	Seats won / Seats contested	Change in seats	Votes	Vote %	Change in vote %
2018	Chhattisgarh	90	0 / 7	Steady	48,255	0.34%	▼0.32%
2018	Rajasthan	200	0 / 16	Steady	42,820	0.12%	▼0.06%
2018	Tripura	60	0 / 1	▼1	19,352	0.82%	▼0.85%
2019	Andhra Pradesh	175	0 / 7	Steady	34,746	0.11%	—N/a
2019	Jharkhand	81	0 / 18	Steady	68,589	0.46%	▼0.43%
2019	Maharashtra	288	0 / 16	Steady	35,188	0.06%	▼0.07%
2019	Odisha	147	0 / 3	Steady	29,235	0.12%	▼0.39%
2020	Bihar	243	2 / 6	▲2	349,489	0.83%	▼0.57%
2021	Assam	126	0 / 1	Steady	27,290	0.84%	▼0.14%
2021	Kerala	140	17 / 23	▼2	1,579,235	7.58%	▼0.54%
2021	Puducherry	30	0 / 1	Steady	7,522	0.90%	▼0.2%
2021	Tamil Nadu	234	2 / 6	▲2	504,537	1.09%	▲0.3%
2021	West Bengal	294	0 / 10	▼1	118,655	0.20%	▼1.25%
2022	Uttar Pradesh	403	0 / 35	Steady	64,011	0.07%	▼0.09%
2022	Uttarakhand	70	0 / 4	Steady	2,325	0.04%	
2022	Manipur	60	0 / 2	Steady	1,032	0.06%	▼0.68%
2022	Himachal Pradesh	68	0 / 1	Steady	627	0.01%	▼0.03%
2022	Punjab	117	0 / 7	Steady	7,440	0.05%	
2022	Gujarat	182	0 / 3	Steady	2,688	0.01%	▼0.01%
2023	Telangana	119	1 / 1	▲1	80,336	0.34	▼0.07
2023	Chhattisgarh	90	0 / 3	Steady	6,594	0.39	▲0.5%
2024	Andhra Pradesh	175	0 / 8	Steady	12,832	0.04%	▼0.07%
2024	Jharkhand	81	0 / 11	Steady	36,057	0.20%	▼0.26%
2024	Haryana	90	0 / 11	Steady	1,342	0.02%	
2024	Maharashtra	288	0 / 2	Steady	12,911	0.02%	▼0.04%
2024	Odisha	147	0 / 4	Steady	19,935	0.08%	▼0.04%
2025	Bihar	243	0 / 9	▼2	372,458	0.74%	▼0.09%
2026	Assam	126	0 / 5	Steady			
2026	Kerala	140	8 / 24	▼9	1,434,524	6.64%	▼0.94%
2026	Puducherry	30	0 / 2	Steady			
2026	Tamil Nadu	234	2 / 5	Steady	326,488	0.66%	▼0.43%
2026	West Bengal	294	0 / 1	Steady	99,223	0.16%	▼0.04%

- N/A indicates Not Available
- indicates in government or in Coalition government

Results from the Election Commission of India website. Results do not deal with partitions of states, defections and by-elections during the mandate period. ^{*} : 12 seats in Assam and 1 in Meghalaya did not vote.

State	Candidates 2019	Elected 2019	Candidates 2014	Elected 2014	Candidates 2009	Elected 2009	Total seats
Andhra Pradesh	2	0	1	0	2	0	25 (2014) / 42 (2009)
Arunachal Pradesh	0	0	0	0	0	0	2
Assam	2	0	1	0	3	0	14
Bihar	2	0	2	0	7	0	40
Chhattisgarh	1	0	2	0	1	0	11
Goa	0	0	2	0	2	0	2
Gujarat	1	0	1	0	1	0	26
Haryana	1	0	2	0	1	0	10
Himachal Pradesh	0	0	0	0	0	0	4
Jammu and Kashmir	0	0	0	0	1	0	6
Jharkhand	3	0	3	0	3	0	14
Karnataka	1	0	3	0	1	0	28
Kerala	4	0	4	1	4	0	20
Madhya Pradesh	4	0	5	0	3	0	29
Maharashtra	2	0	4	0	3	0	48
Manipur	1	0	1	0	1	0	2
Meghalaya	0	0	1	0	1	0	2
Mizoram	0	0	0	0	0	0	1
Nagaland	0	0	0	0	0	0	1
Odisha	1	0	4	0	1	1	21
Punjab	2	0	5	0	2	0	13
Rajasthan	3	0	3	0	2	0	25
Sikkim	0	0	0	0	0	0	1
Tamil Nadu	2	2	8	0	3	1	39
Tripura	0	0	0	0	0	0	2
Telangana	2	0					17
Uttar Pradesh	12	0	8	0	9	0	80
Uttarakhand	0	0	1	0	1	0	5
West Bengal	3	0	3	0	3	2	42
Union Territories:
Andaman and Nicobar Islands	0	0	0	0	0	0	1
Chandigarh	0	0	0	0	0	0	1
Dadra and Nagar Haveli	0	0	0	0	0	0	1
Daman and Diu	0	0	0	0	0	0	1
Delhi	0	0	1	0	1	0	7
Lakshadweep	1	0	1	0	0	0	1
Puducherry	0	0	1	0	0	0	1
Total	50	2	67	1	56	4	543

== See also ==
- Politics of India
- List of political parties in India
- List of communist parties in India
- List of communist parties
- Left Democratic Front (Kerala)
- Left Front (West Bengal)
- Left Front (Tripura)
