= List of people from Thrissur =

The following is a list of prominent people born / settled in areas coming under the present day Thrissur District, Kerala.

== Science and academia ==
- Pulickel Ajayan
- George Menachery
- Mani Menon
- K. N. Panikkar
- K. Radhakrishnan
- Sankaranarayana
- P. N. Vinayachandran

== Beauty pageants ==
- Rahul Rajasekharan
- Vishnu Raj Menon

== Economy and business ==
- M. A. Yousuf Ali
- Joy Alukkas
- Kochouseph Chittilappilly
- John Matthai
- K. P. Karunakara Menon
- PNC Menon (Originally from Palakkad district, later migrated to Thrissur with his parents)
- K. N. Raj
- P. Mohamed Ali
- T. S. Kalyanaraman
- M. P. Ramachandran

== Spiritual leaders ==
- Swami Bhoomananda Tirtha
- Mar George Alapatt
- Mar Raphael Cheenath
- Pulikkottil Joseph Mar Dionysious I (Mar Thoma X)
- Geevarghese Philoxenos II
- Pulikkottil Joseph Mar Dionysious II
- Euphrasia Eluvathingal
- Canisius Thekkekara
- Alex Kaliyanil
- Franco Mulakkal
- Mar Aprem Mooken
- Awgin Kuriakose
- Cyril Mar Baselios I
- Swami Ranganathananda
- Antony Thachuparambil
- Mar Jacob Thoomkuzhy
- Mar Andrews Thazhath
- Mar Raphael Thattil
- Paulose II, Catholicos of the East
- Mariam Thresia Chiramel

== Literature ==
- Balamani Amma
- Sukumar Azhikode
- P. Bhaskaran
- Sarah Joseph
- Kovilan
- K. Kunchunniraja
- Lalitha Lenin
- Madampu Kunjukuttan
- Kunjunni Mash
- George Menachery
- M. K. Ramachandran
- K. Satchidanandan
- C. V. Sreeraman
- Kamala Surayya
- Kodungallur Kunjikkuttan Thampuran
- Attoor Ravi Varma
- R Ramachandran
- V. K. N.
- M. N. Vijayan
- M. Leelavathy
- Attoor Krishna Pisharody
- N. V. Krishna Warrier
- Madhavan Ayyappath
- V. K. Sreeraman
- Vijayarajamallika

== Politics ==
- R. Bindu
- P. R. Francis
- P. P. George
- K. Karunakaran (Originally from Kannur district, migrated to Thrissur for treating his visual disorder)
- C. Achutha Menon
- C. N. Jayadevan
- Panampilly Govinda Menon
- Joseph Mundassery
- K. P. Prabhakaran
- K. P. Rajendran
- Therambil Ramakrishnan
- Rajaji Mathew Thomas
- V. M. Sudheeran
- M.P Vincent
- E. Ikkanda Warrier
- V. V. Raghavan
- K. Muraleedharan
- K. Radhakrishnan (politician)
- Anil Akkara
- A. C. Moideen

== Performing artists ==
- Ammannur Madhava Chakyar
- Kalamandalam Gopi
- Kalamandalam Hyderali
- Kalamandalam Appukutty Poduval

== Singers ==
- Bombay Sisters
- Gayatri Asokan
- P Jayachandran
- KK
- Asha G Menon
- Unni Menon
- Jyotsna Radhakrishnan
- Pradip Somasundaran
- Thrissur R. Vaidyanatha Bhagavathar
- Vaishnav Girish

== Malayalam film industry ==
- Omar Lulu
- K. J. Joy
- Sathish Kalathil
- Premji
- Sathyan Anthikkad
- Ramu Kariat
- Mala Aravindan
- Bombay Sisters
- Edavela Babu
- Bahadoor
- Bharathan
- P. Bhaskaran
- Biju Menon
- Sudha Chandran
- Devan
- Gopika
- Innocent
- Johnson
- Santhosh Jogi
- Alphons Joseph
- Mejo Joseph
- pramod Pappan
- Rima Kallingal
- Kamal
- Yusuf Ali Kechery
- Lena
- A. K. Lohithadas
- Mallika
- Kalabhavan Mani
- P. N. Menon
- Renuka Menon
- Sindhu Menon
- Unni Mukundan
- Narain
- Ouseppachan
- Pavithran
- Philomina
- T. G. Ravi
- Shankar
- Sheela
- Mohan Sithara
- Sreenath
- Oduvil Unnikrishnan
- Samyuktha Varma
- K. R. Vijaya
- Geetha Vijayan
- Vani Viswanath
- Manju Warrier
- C. I. Paul
- Akku Akbar
- Priyanandanan
- Rafeeq Ahammed
- Lal Jose
- V. K. Sreeraman
- Tovino Thomas
- Anupama Parameswaran
- Jyothi Krishna
- Rachana Narayanankutty
- Gayathri Suresh
- Aparna Balamurali
- Malavika Menon
- Malavika Wales
- Irshad
- Lijo Jose Pellissery
- Joju George
- Shivaji Guruvayoor
- Bhavana
- N F Varghese
- Sadiq
- Franco
- Naslen

== Sports ==
- Jo Paul Ancheri
- I. M. Vijayan
- Rino Anto
- Shreyas Iyer
- Sandeep Warrier
- Rahul Kannoly Praveen
- Nihal Sarin
- Vibin Mohanan
- Sachin Suresh
