= Kechery =

Kechery Kecheri
- town
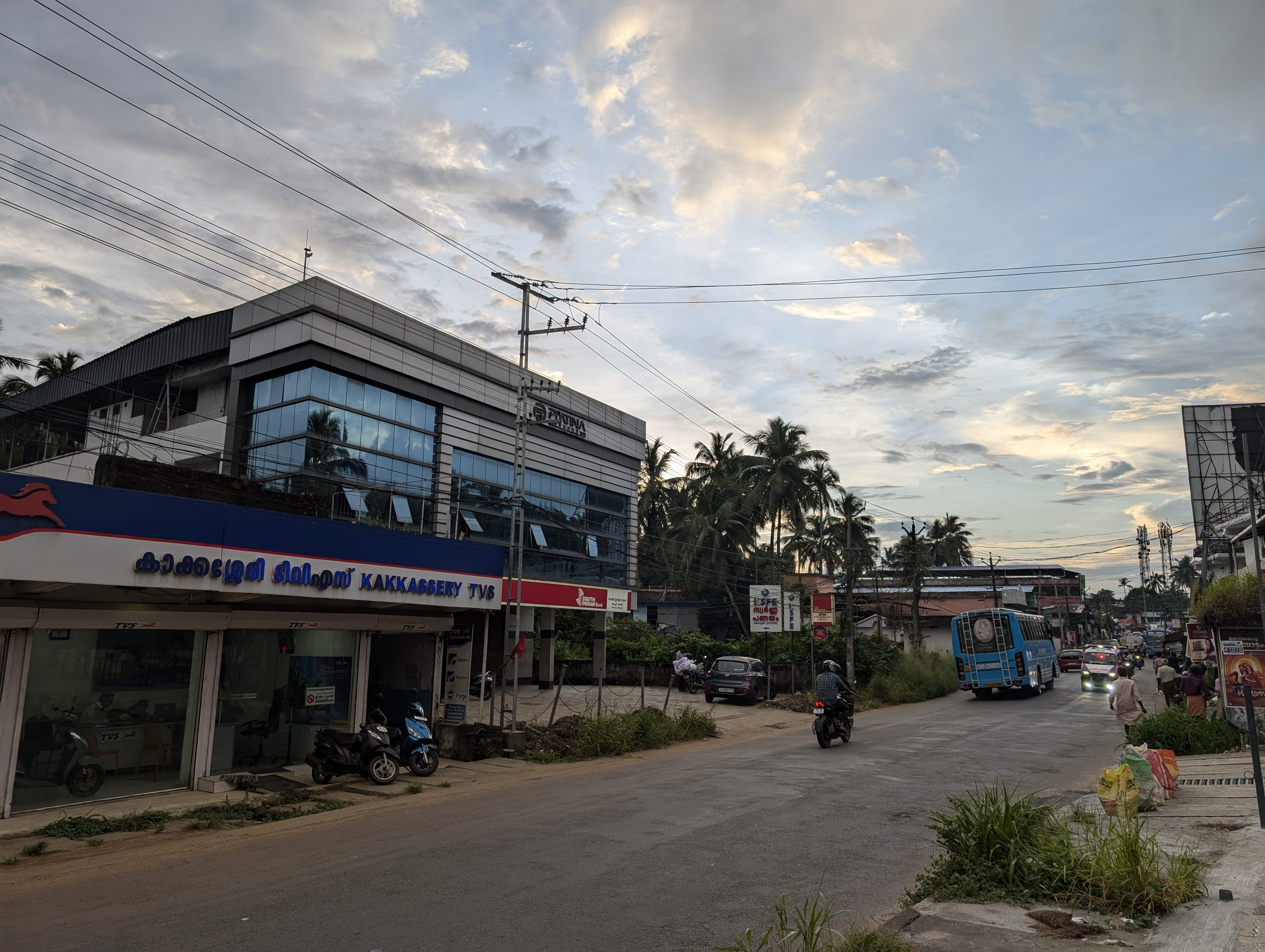
- Perumala near Kechery

- Location in Kerala, India
- Coordinates: 10°37′0″N 76°6′0″E
- Country: India
- State: Kerala
- District: Thrissur

Government
  - Body: Choondal Grama Panchayath

Languages
  - Official: Malayalam, English
- Time zone: UTC+5:30 (IST)
- PIN: 680501
- Telephone code: 04885
- Vehicle registration: KL-46
- Nearest city: Thrissur

Kechery is a town in Thrissur district, Kerala, India. It is 16 kilometers away from Thrissur and 7 kilometers from Kunnamkulam. One of the important hindu pilgrim center Guruvayur temple is 11 kilometres away from here.

== History ==
Kechery is a place which has its own culture and heritage. You can find a mosaic of different cultures, religious and lineages. Kechery is on the bank of the river Kechery Puzha, which is named after the village. There is an old areca nut market known throughout the country. Kechery is renowned for its contributions to world in fields as diverse as football to literature to films.

Kechery is an important business centre in Choondal Grama Panchayath, Thrissur District, Kerala, India. This place is host to numerous political, social and cultural activities. Sri. K.P. Aravindakshan, former M.P. (Rajyasabha) and chief whip of Kerala, Yousafali Kechery a famous poet, film lyricist, film producer and director of Kerala and former President of Sahitya Academy. Dr. Radhakrishna Kaimal, Sri. P.T. Lazar Master, Sri. E.P. Bharatha Pisharodi, Dr. K.K. Rajan, Sri. C.L. Porinchukutty, Muhammed Fasal R.K, are some of the important personalities in these fields.

== Geography ==
The river Kechery, named after the village, begins in the Machad forest range which is about 6000 feet above sea level and flows through different areas. Eranellur, Chiranellur, Perumannu, Thuvanoor, Parannur and Choondal are situated on both sides of Kechery river. One important project in the river is Parannur chira (പാറന്നൂർ ചിറ), it serves irrigation purposes of the villages around it. Nowadays Parannur Chira is getting more popular for tourism and film shooting. Kechery is surrounded with Peruvanmala hill (East), Choondal hill (South), Choondal rock and Peruvan Chira (West), Pattikara backwater and Parappur backwater (North).

== Celebrations ==
The place is well known for celebrations. Kechery Parappukkavu Bhagavathy Temple Vela Pooram festival is the most famous and colorful event because of the number of elephants and festival related myths and beliefs.Vela Pooram is celebrated on the 16th and 17th of the Malayalam month Meenam. Eranellur Palli Perunnal is celebrated on February, Neelankavu Pooram, Perumannu Pisharikkal Temple Karthika Vilakku, Ayyappan Vilakku and Nabi Dinam are the major cultural festivals.

== Culture and religion ==
The cultural life of Kechery reflects the broader traditions of central Kerala, characterised by temple festivals, church feasts, and mosque gatherings that contribute to the region’s social fabric. The coexistence of Hindu, Christian, and Muslim communities is reflected in the presence of diverse places of worship and shared participation in local events.

Religious festivals and annual celebrations form an integral part of community life. Residents often participate in major regional festivals such as Thrissur Pooram, one of Kerala’s most prominent temple festivals, held in nearby Thrissur.

Kechery and its surrounding areas are home to several temples, churches, and mosques that serve as important religious and cultural centres. Notable pilgrimage sites in the region include:

- Parappukkavu Bhagavathy Temple, Kechery
- Neelankavu Bhagavathy Temple, Kechery
- Peruvanmala Siva Temple, Thalakkottukara
- Pisharikkal Karthyayani Temple, Perumannu
- Palathum Bhagavathy Temple, Thuvanoor
- Our Lady of Rosary Church, Eranellur
- Juma Masjid, Kechery
- Juma Masjid, Perumannu

These institutions host regular rituals, festivals, and community events, contributing to the cultural identity and social cohesion of the locality.

== Notable Personalities ==
- Yusufali Kechery – National Award winning Film lyricist, Poet, Film producer and Director
- M. K. Ramachandran - Kerala Sahithya Academy award winner
- Irshad Ali – Malayalam film actor
- Assim Jamal -Malayalam film actor
- K.P. Aravindakshan – Government Chief Whip in 8th Kerala Legislative Assembly and Parliamentary Member in Rajya Sabha (1967–68)
- C. L. Porinchukutty – Artist and Former Principal of College of Fine Arts Trivandrum
