= Ollur Assembly constituency =

Constituency of the Kerala legislative assembly in India

Coordinates: 10.49°N 76.24°E

Ollur
- Constituency No. 66 for the Kerala Legislative Assembly
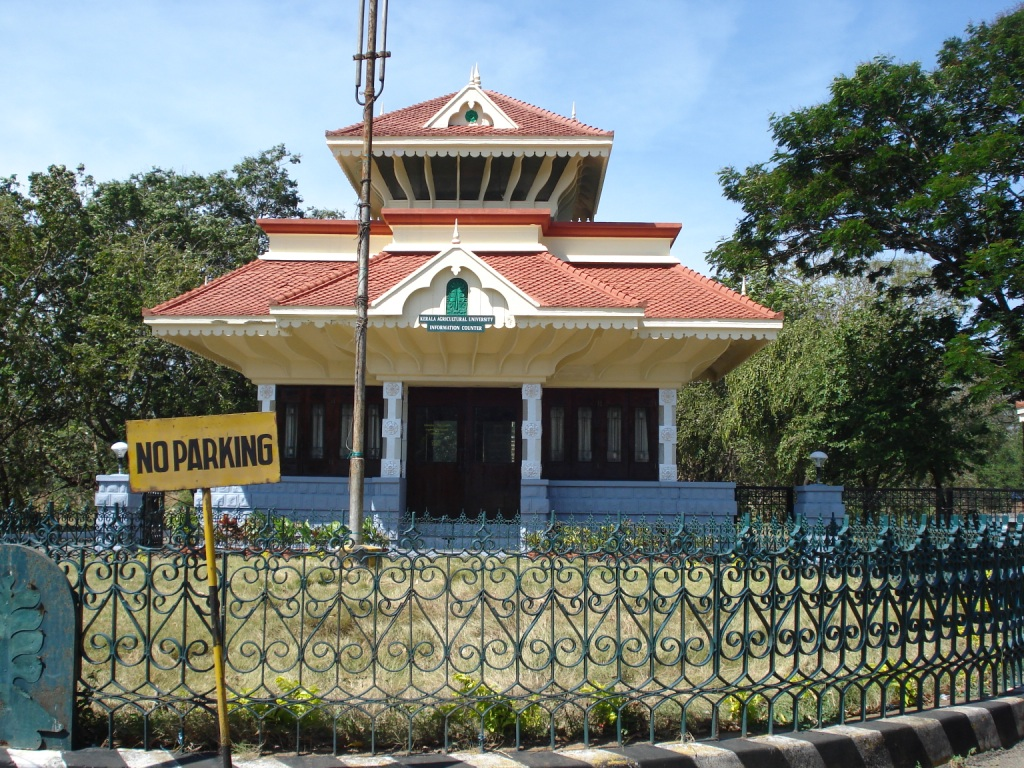
- Kerala Agricultural University entrance

Constituency details
- Country: India
- Region: South India
- State: Kerala
- District: Thrissur
- Established: 1957
- Total electors: 2,07,881(2016)
- Reservation: None

Member of Legislative Assembly
- 16th Kerala Legislative Assembly
- Incumbent K. Rajan
- Party: CPI
- Alliance: LDF
- Elected year: 2026

Ollur State assembly constituency is one of the 140 state legislative assembly constituencies in Kerala. It is also one of the seven state legislative assembly constituencies included in Thrissur Lok Sabha constituency. As of the 2026 Assembly elections, the current MLA is K. Rajan of CPI.

== Local self-governed segments ==
Ollur Assembly constituency is composed of the following 14 wards of the Thrissur Municipal Corporation (Ollur zone, Mannuthy zone and Koorkenchery zone), and four Gram Panchayats in Thrissur taluk:

Wards of Thrissur Municipal Corporation in Ollur Assembly constituency
| Ward no. | Name | Ward no. | Name | Ward no. | Name |
|---|---|---|---|---|---|
| 17 | Mullakkara | 18 | Mannuthy | 24 | Valarkavu |
| 25 | Kuriachira | 26 | Ancheri | 28 | Patavarad |
| 29 | Edakkunni | 30 | Thaikkattussery | 31 | Ollur |
| 32 | Chiyyaram South | 41 | Koorkenchery | 42 | Kanimangalam |
| 43 | Panamukku | 44 | Nedupuzha | | |

Other Local Bodies in Ollur Assembly constituency
| Sl no. | Name | Local Body Type | Taluk |
|---|---|---|---|
| 1 | Madakkathara | Grama panchayat | Thrissur |
| 2 | Nadathara | Grama panchayat | Thrissur |
| 3 | Pananchery | Grama panchayat | Thrissur |
| 4 | Puthur | Grama panchayat | Thrissur |

== Members of the Legislative Assembly ==
The following list contains all members of Kerala Legislative Assembly who have represented the constituency:

| Election | Niyama Sabha | Name | Party | Tenure |
|---|---|---|---|---|
| 1957 | 1st | P. R. Francis | Indian National Congress | 1957 – 1960 |
| 1960 | 2nd | P. R. Francis | Indian National Congress | 1960 – 1965 |
| 1967 | 3rd | A. V. Aryan | Communist Party of India | 1967 – 1970 |
| 1970 | 4th | P. R. Francis | Indian National Congress | 1970 – 1977 |
| 1977 | 5th | P. R. Francis | Indian National Congress | 1977 – 1980 |
| 1980 | 6th | Raghavan Pozhakadavil | Indian National Congress | 1980 – 1982 |
| 1982 | 7th | Raghavan Pozhakadavil | Indian National Congress | 1982 – 1987 |
| 1987 | 8th | A. M. Paraman | Communist Party of India | 1987 – 1991 |
| 1991 | 9th | P. P. George | Indian National Congress | 1991 – 1996 |
| 1996 | 10th | C. N. Jayadevan | Communist Party of India | 1996 – 2001 |
| 2001 | 11th | P. P. George | Indian National Congress | 2001 – 2006 |
| 2006 | 12th | Rajaji Mathew Thomas | Communist Party of India | 2006 – 2011 |
| 2011 | 13th | M. P. Vincent | Indian National Congress | 2011 – 2016 |
| 2016 | 14th | K. Rajan | Communist Party of India | 2016 – 2021 |
| 2021 | 15th | K. Rajan | Communist Party of India | 2021 - 2026 |
| 2026 | 16th | K. Rajan | Communist Party of India | 2026 - |

== Election results ==
=== 2026 ===
2026 Kerala Legislative Assembly election: Ollur
| Party | Candidate | Votes | % | ±% |
|---|---|---|---|---|
| CPI | K. Rajan | 69,703 | 45.86 | ▼3.23 |
| INC | Adv. Shaji J. Kodankandath | 60,819 | 40.02 | ▲4.71 |
| BJP | Bijoy Thomas | 19,737 | 12.99 | ▼1.29 |
| AAP | Prinson Avinissery | 594 | 0.39 | |
| Independent | Edwin Babu Alapat | 275 | 0.18 | |
| NOTA | None of the above | 862 | 0.57 | ▲0.06 |
| Margin of victory | | 8,884 | 5.84 | ▼7.94 |
| Turnout | | 1,51,990 | | |
| CPI hold | | Swing | ▼3.23 | |

=== 2021 ===
2021 Kerala Legislative Assembly election: Ollur
| Party | Candidate | Votes | % | ±% |
|---|---|---|---|---|
| CPI | K. Rajan | 76,657 | 49.09 | ▲1.54 |
| INC | Jose Valloor | 55,151 | 35.31 | ▼3.45 |
| BJP | Adv. B. Gopalakrishnan | 22,295 | 14.28 | ▲2.54 |
| NOTA | None of the above | 827 | 0.51 | − |
| BSP | P K Subramanian | 282 | 0.18 | − |
| Independent | K K George Kakkassey | 628 | 0.4 | − |
| Independent | Benny Kodiyatil | 331 | 0.21 | − |
| Margin of victory | | 21,506 | 13.78 | |
| Turnout | | 1,56,171 | 75.13 | |
| CPI hold | | Swing | 1.54 | |

=== 2016 ===
There were 1,93,404 registered voters in the constituency for the 2016 election.

2016 Kerala Legislative Assembly election: Ollur
| Party | Candidate | Votes | % | ±% |
|---|---|---|---|---|
| CPI | K. Rajan | 71,666 | 47.55 | ▲3.08 |
| INC | M. P. Vincent | 58,418 | 38.76 | ▼10.45 |
| BDJS | P. K. Santhosh | 17,694 | 11.74 | − |
| NOTA | None of the above | 1,151 | 0.76 | − |
| PDP | Majeed Mullakara | 696 | 0.46 | − |
| CPI(ML) Red Star | Sajimon Manjamattam | 334 | 0.22 | − |
| Independent | Vincent M. D. Marottikkal | 279 | 0.19 | − |
| Independent | K. G. Rajan | 267 | 0.18 | |
| Independent | V. N. Asokhan | 214 | 0.14 | − |
| Margin of victory | | 13,248 | 8.79 | |
| CPI gain from INC | | Swing | ▲3.08 | |
| Turnout | | 1,50,719 | 77.93 | ▲3.46 |

=== 2011 ===
There were 1,76,875 registered voters in the constituency for the 2011 election.

2011 Kerala Legislative Assembly election: Ollur
| Party | Candidate | Votes | % | ±% |
|---|---|---|---|---|
| INC | M. P. Vincent | 64,823 | 49.21 | |
| CPI | Rajaji Mathew Thomas | 58,576 | 44.47 | |
| BJP | Sundararajan | 6,761 | 5.13 | |
| Independent | Suresh M. R. | 717 | 0.54 | |
| BSP | Sunny K. John | 434 | 0.33 | |
| Independent | Ratheesh T. Nair | 407 | 0.31 | |
| Margin of victory | | 6,247 | 4.74 | |
| INC gain from CPI | | Swing | | |
| Turnout | | 1,31,718 | 74.47 | |
