= Pananchery Mudikkode Shiva Temple =

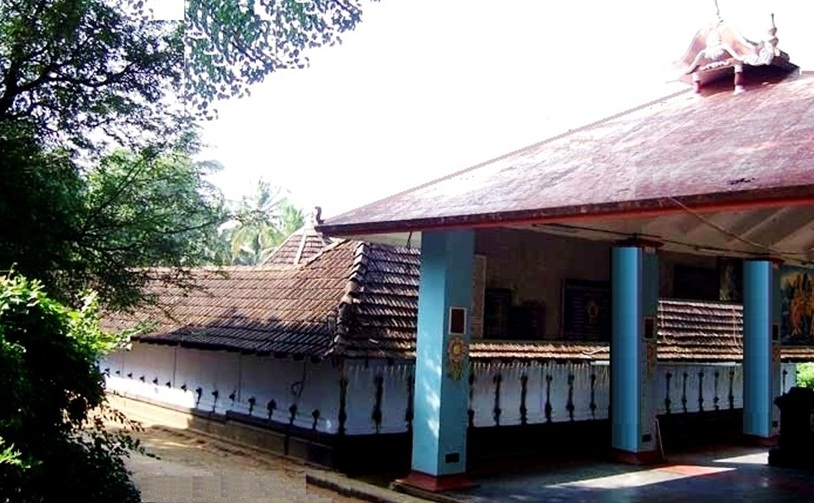
- Temple Entrance

- Mudikkode Shiva Temple, Pananchery, Thrissur, Kerala

Religion
- Affiliation: Hinduism
- District: Thrissur
- Deity: Shiva
- Festival: Maha Shivaratri

Location
- Location: Mudikkode, Pananchery
- State: Kerala
- Country: India
- Interactive map of Pananchery Mudikkode Shiva Temple
- Coordinates: 10.550949°N 76.307479°E

Architecture
- Type: Kerala style
- Completed: Not known

Specifications
- Temple: One
- Monument: 1
- Elevation: 46.81 m (154 ft)

Pananchery Mudikkode Shiva Temple is an ancient Hindu temple dedicated to Shiva at Pananchery of Thrissur District in Kerala state in India. The presiding deity of the temple is Shiva, located in main Sanctum Sanctorum, facing West. According to folklore, sage Parashurama has installed the idol. The temple is a part of the 108 famous Shiva temples in Kerala.

It is believed that this temple is one of the 108 Shiva temples of Kerala and is installed by sage Parasurama dedicated to Shiva.

== Festival ==
Maha Shivarathri festival of the temple is celebrated in the Malayalam month of Kumbha (February - March).

== Location ==
It is 12 km from Trichur in Prehi or Palakkad route.

== See also ==
- 108 Shiva Temples
- Temples of Kerala
- Hindu temples in Thrissur Rural
