= Centre of Indian Communists =

Political party in India

Centre of Indian Communists (CIC) was a minor Maoist group in the Indian state of Kerala 1974–1978. CIC was a continuation of the Communist Unity Centre, formed in 1972 and was later supplanted by the Communist Bolshevik Party. CIC was formed by sectors that had broken away from the Communist Party of India (Marxist). CIC represented a moderate trend in the Indian Maoist movement. The organization was banned during the Emergency.

== History ==
=== Communist Unity Centre 1972-1974 ===
The Communist Unity Centre, the forerunner of CIC, was formed in April 1972 through the merger of the groups of A. V. Aryan, K. P. R. Gopalan and Arayakandi Achuthan. A.V. Aryan's group was a significant split from the Communist Party of India (Marxist) in Thrissur. A.V. Aryan had been expelled from CPI(M) due to differences with E.M.S. Namboodiripad. There was significant tensions and conflict between the CUC in Thrissur and the CPI(M) led by Azhikodan Raghavan. Primarily CUC challenged CPI(M) for control over the trade union movement in the area. CUC was denounced as a 'Naxalite' group by CPI(M), and Azhikodan Raghavan had been tasked by E.M.S. Namboodiripad to break the influence of CUC in the area. To a certain extent the CPI(M) was able to curtail the influence of CUC in Thrissur. Azhikodan Raghavan was murdered on September 23, 1972, and police immediately suspected the CUC. David, a porter and CUC member, was killed by CPI(M) members. A.V. Aryan, who was one of the CUC secretaries, and seven other CUC members were arrested and put on trial for the assassination. A.V. Aryan was released, whilst one of his co-defendants was sentenced to life imprisonment and the six others to one year and a half in prison. After the murder of Azhikodan Raghavan the influence of CUC declined.

=== Founding of CIC and the efforts for unity of Maoist organizations ===
The Centre of Indian Communists was founded at a convention in Cochin in 14–15 December 1974. The convention was attended by 500 delegates, including some prominent former CPI(M) members. Attendees included K.P.R. Gopalan, P. Gangadharan, J. Abraham and M.T. Thomas. The founding convention elected a 19-member committee with A.V. Aryan as its chairman. Arayakandi Achuthan was one of the committee members.

The CIC convention pledged to adhere to the ideology of the Chinese Communist Party, but adapted to local conditions. The convention called for the establishment of a 'people's government' through revolutionary armed struggle of workers and peasants. The document adopted by the founding convention identified Communist Party of India (Marxist-Leninist) (CPI(ML)) as 'Indian Narodniks'. CIC denounced the Communist Party of India for 'right-wing opportunism', the CPI(M) for 'left-wing opportunism' and CPI(ML) for 'adventurism'. Far Eastern Economic Review described the CIC as, compared to other splinter groups of CPI(M), as 'mellow'.

At the time of its foundation CIC claimed to be in contact with groups outside Kerala, such as the Lenin Banner group in West Bengal, the T. Nagi Reddy group in Andhra Pradesh and the A.K. Roy group in Bihar. However Manoranjan Mohanty noted that later CIC stayed away from participating in the efforts to unify different Maoist groups in India during the latter half of the 1970s.

=== 1975 ban and foundation of the Communist Bolshevik Party ===
CIC was one of ten Maoist groups that were banned by the Central government on 3 July 1975. After the end of the Emergency the Shah Commission noted that one member of the banned CIC was detained. The ban was lifted in March 1977. In May 1978 The Hindu reported that members of CIC had participated in the founding of the a new party, Communist (Bolshevik) Party, in at a conference in Cochin, together with former members of CPI, CPI(M), the Communist Unity Centre and the People's Democratic Front. The main leaders of the Communist Bolshevik Party were K.P.R. Gopalan and A.V. Aryan. In 1979 the publication Bolshevik began to be issued from Thrissur, edited by A.V. Aryan.

== See also ==
- List of Naxalite and Maoist groups in India
