= Atul Kumar Anjan =

Indian politician (1954/1955–2024)

Atul Kumar Anjaan
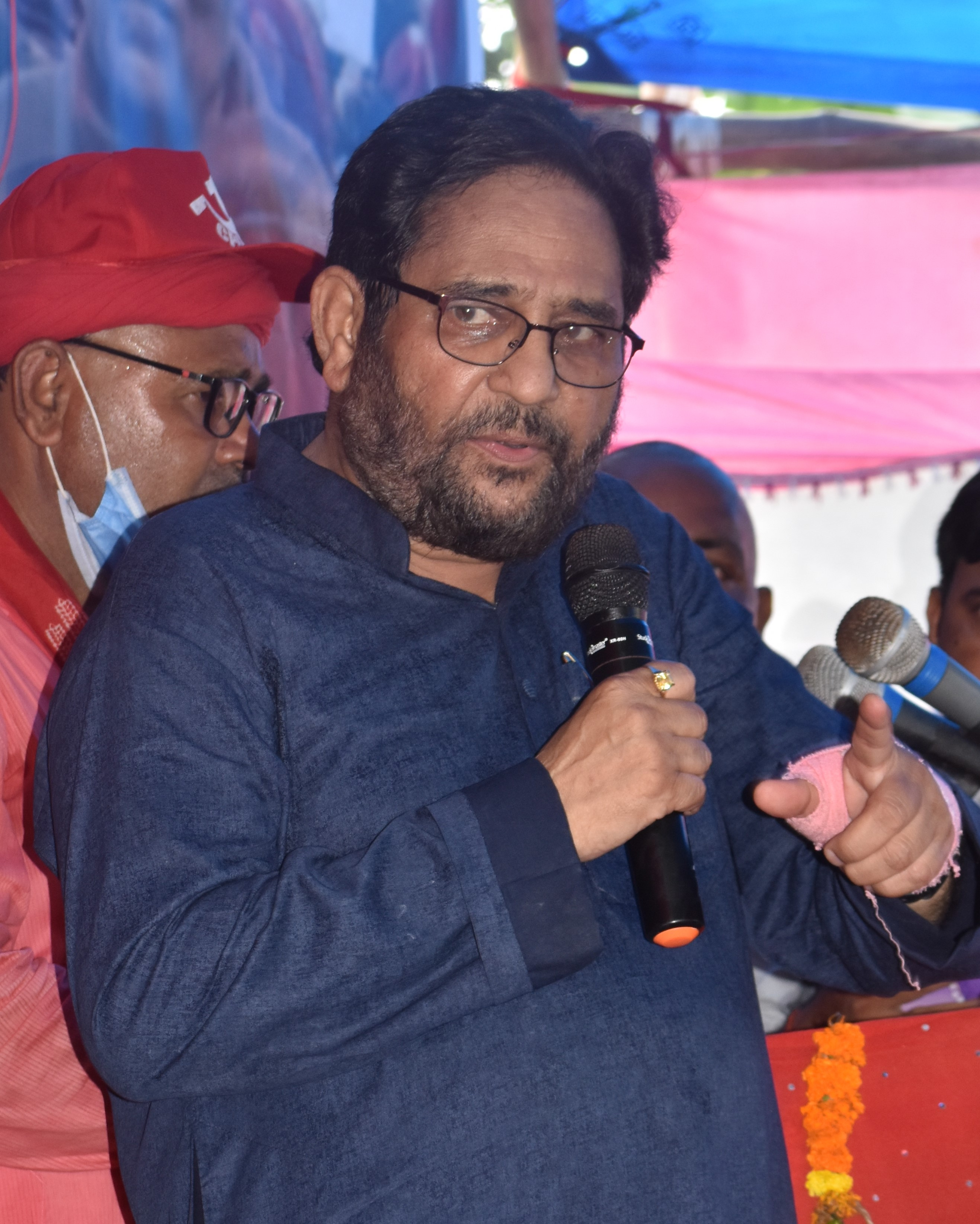

General Secretary of the All India Kisan Sabha
- In office 1997–2024
- Preceded by: Y. V. Krishna Rao

Personal details
- Born: 28 April 1955 Lucknow, Uttar Pradesh, India
- Died: 3 May 2024 (aged 69) Lucknow, Uttar Pradesh, India
- Party: Communist Party of India
- Education: La Martinière College Lucknow University
- Occupation: Social activist, politician

Atul Kumar Anjaan (28 April 1955 – 3 May 2024) was an Indian politician who was a senior CPI leader and national secretary of the Communist Party of India. He was the General Secretary of the All India Kisan Sabha.

Anjan did his schooling from Lucknow in state board school and graduation, post graduation and then L.L.B also from Lucknow University in 1967, 1972, 1976 and 1983 respectively. And he was the student union president of Lucknow University. As of 1978, Anjan was the Uttar Pradesh State President of the All India Students Federation. He was later elected as National President of AISF in 1979 and continued to be in the position till 1986 thus led the organization for seven years.

Ghosi (Lok Sabha constituency) has the history of sending Communist Party of India (CPI) candidates many times and remained a stronghold of communists in northern India till early 1980s but from 1990s onwards the communists lost ground from there but still CPI fielded Atul Kumar as a CPI candidate from Ghosi in the general election, 2014 and he fought unsuccessfully Lok Sabha election since 1998 from Ghosi.

== Death ==
Anjaan died after prolonged battle with cancer at Mayo Hospital in Lucknow, on 3 May 2024, at the age of 69.

== See also ==
- Kalpnath Rai
- Mokhtar Ansari
- Jharkhande Rai
