= Rajaji Mathew Thomas =

Indian politician

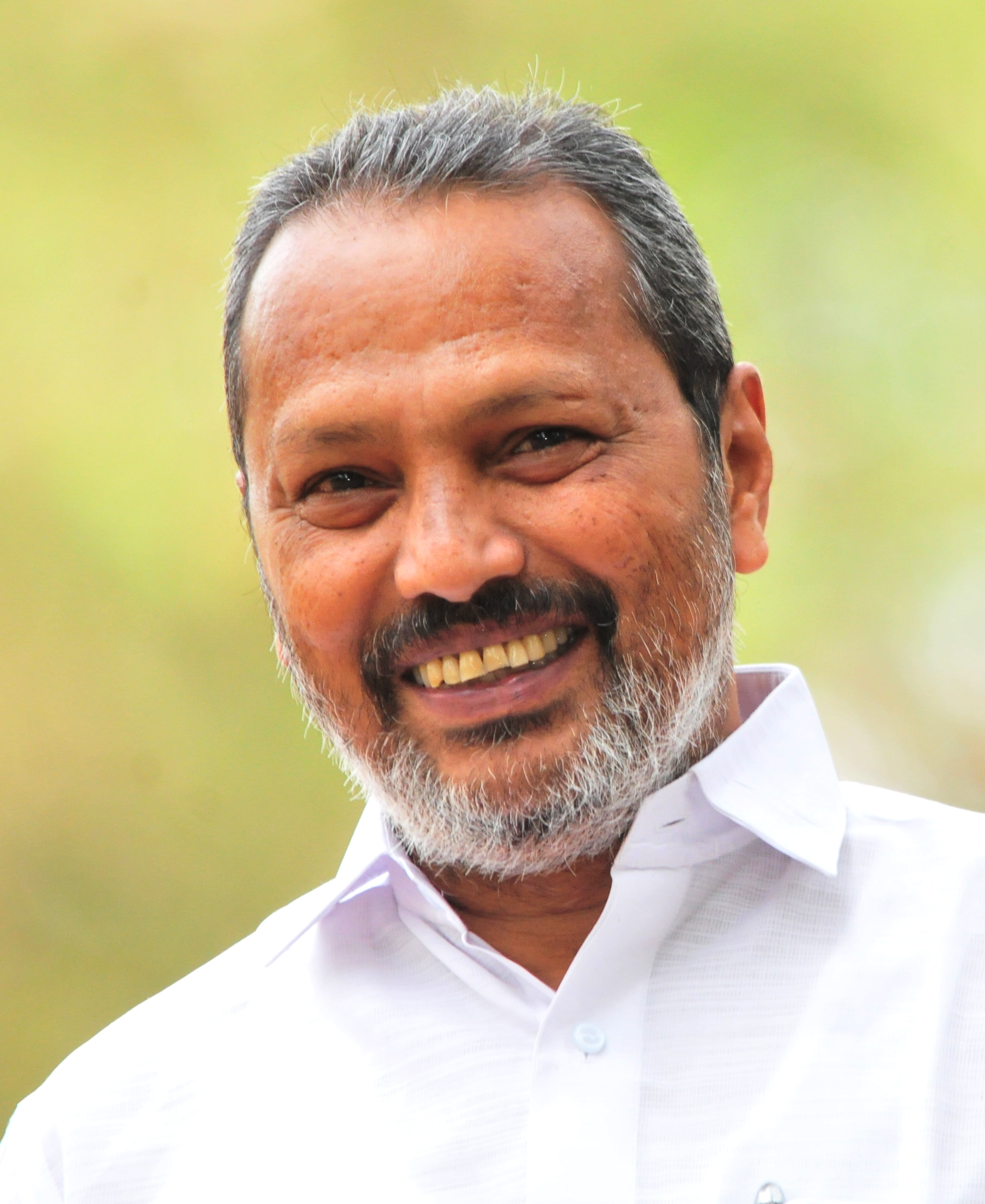

Member of Legislative Assembly
- In office 2006–2011
- Preceded by: P.P. George
- Succeeded by: M. P. Vincent
- Constituency: Ollur

Personal details
- Born: 12 May 1954 (age 72)
- Party: Communist Party of India
- Spouse: K. Santha
- Children: 1 son and 1 daughter
- Education: Sree Kerala Varma College, Thrissur
- Occupation: Journalist, Politician
- Website: www.rajajimathewthomas.com

Rajaji Mathew Thomas is a journalist and a Communist Party of India politician from Thrissur and was the MLA of Ollur from 2006 to 2011. Rajaji Mathew Thomas was the leader of All India Youth Federation and selected as national general secretary. He became the vice President of World Federation of Democratic Youth (WFDY), based at Budapest from 1985 to 1996.

== Personal life ==
He was born as the son of T.K. Thomas and Mariamma Thomas, on 12 May 1954, in Thrissur. He completed his education in St. Aloysius Higher Secondary School, Elthuruth and Sree Keralavarma College, Thrissur and got a M.A. (Master in Arts) degree. He is well versed in Malayalam, English, Hindi and Magyar (Hungarian) languages. He married Smt. K. Santha and has got one son and one daughter. He visited 78 countries across the world, as part of his career.

== Political career ==
He entered politics through All India Students Federation (AISF), as the unit secretary of AISF in Sree Kerala Varma college. Later he became the district president and later National general Secretary of AISF. Later he became active in All India Youth Federation (AIYF).

He became the vice President of World Federation of Democratic Youth (WFDY), based at Budapest from 1985 to 1996. He held office of its commission on Asia and Oceania, Deputy Head of its Press and Information Department and Deputy Head of Peace and Disarmament Commission, Co-ordinator of the Permanent commission of the 13th world Festival of Youth and Students held in Pyongyang in 1989 and was Co-ordinator of Kerala social Forum 2004. He also performed as UN observer in the 1989 Nicaraguan President election and also participated in the Independence declaration of Namibia.

He led the delegation presenting peace appeal on behalf of World Youth to George Bush and Mikhail Gorbachev, during the Kremlin Summit. He was included in the WFDY delegation which presented its highest honor, the "WFDY diploma" to Nelson Mandela, at the historic Wembley Stadium in London, for his contribution made in heightening the struggle against imperialism.

He participated in the preparation of framing of a National Youth Policy initiated by then Indian Prime Minister V.P. Singh. He was also a member of National committee for youth programme headed by then Prime minister P.V. Narasimha Rao. Rajaji was active with NGO works also and was president of "Green India" and General Secretary of "Strategic Action", voluntary organisations working on environmental and developmental issues.

He became the National Council Member of Communist Party of India (CPI) in 1996.

He was elected as Member of Legislative Assembly of Kerala, from Ollur constituency, in 2006. But in 2011 election, he got defeated by Congress candidate M.P. Vincent.

He was working as district executive committee member of CPI and General Secretary of All India Peace and Solidarity Organisation, in Thrissur district. He was also working as Vice President of AIPSO state council.

He is presently working as Executive committee member of CPI Kerala state Council.

He contested the 2019 Indian general election in Kerala as a candidate of LDF in Thrissur constituency and lost in this election to the Congress candidate T.N. Prathapan.

== As journalist ==
Rajaji is at present editor of Janayugom newspaper, the organ of CPI in Kerala. He worked before as the sub-editor of Janayugom weekly, Editor of "Youth Life", fortnightly organ of AIYF National council. He has also worked as member of Editorial board of "world Youth", the official organ of WFDY. As a writer, he published a number of articles in English and Malayalam, presented papers and delivered lectures in Universities and Educational Institutions in India and abroad. He published three translated books.
