= K. Rajan (politician) =

Indian politician

Adv. K. Rajan
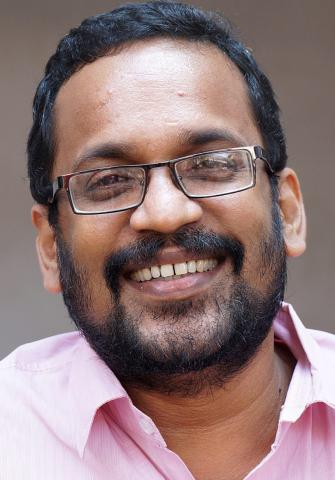

Minister for Revenue and Housing, Government of Kerala
- In office 20 May 2021 – 4 May 2026
- Chief Minister: Pinarayi Vijayan
- Departments: • Revenue • Housing
- Portfolios: List: Land Revenue; Survey and Land Records; Land Reforms; Housing
- Preceded by: E. Chandrasekharan
- Succeeded by: A. P. Anil Kumar (Revenue); Mons Joseph (Housing)

Chief Whip of Kerala Legislative Assembly
- In office 28 June 2019 – 3 May 2021
- Preceded by: Thomas Unniyadan
- Succeeded by: N. Jayaraj

Member of the Kerala Legislative Assembly
- Incumbent
- Assumed office 2 June 2016
- Preceded by: M. P. Vincent
- Constituency: Ollur

Personal details
- Born: 26 May 1973 (age 53) Anthikad, Thrissur, Kerala, India
- Party: Communist Party of India
- Spouse: Anupama N.
- Parents: P. Krishnankutti Menon; K. Remani
- Education: Sree Kerala Varma College, Thrissur (Bachelor of Science); Kerala Law Academy Law College, Thiruvananthapuram (Bachelor of Laws)

Krishnankutti Rajan (born 26 May 1973) is an Indian politician who has served as the Minister for Revenue and Housing of Kerala since 2021 till 2026. He previously served as the Chief Whip of the Kerala Legislative Assembly from 2019 to 2021. He is a Member of the Kerala Legislative Assembly since 2016 representing Ollur.

He is also a member of the Kerala State Executive Committee of Communist Party of India and national secretary of AIYF.

== Personal life ==
Son of Shri P. Krishnankutti Menon and Smt. K. Remani; born at Anthikad on 26 May 1973. He is married to Smt. Anupama N.

== Political career ==
- Secretary AISF Kerala & AIYF Kerala
- Vice President, AISF National
- Secretary, AIYF National
- Executive Member, CPI Kerala
- Council Member, CPI National
- MLA, Ollur (2016–21)
- MLA, Ollur (2021-2026)
- Chief Whip, Kerala LA
- Cabinet Minister, Government of Kerala
  - Minister for Revenue Department
  - Minister for Housing Department
- MLA, Ollur(2026-)

Kerala Legislative Assembly Election
Year	Constituency	Closest Rival	Majority (Votes)	Won/Lost
2016	Ollur	M P Vincent (INC)	13248	Won
2021	Ollur	Jose Valloor (INC)	21506	Won
2026	Ollur	Adv. Shaji J. Kodankandath (INC)	8,884	Won
