= Pramod Prabhakar =

Indian politician

- Pramod Prabhakar addressing a public gathering on 22 June 2026

National Secretary of the All India Kisan Sabha

Personal details
- Citizenship: Indian
- Party: Communist Party of India
- Occupation: Politician

Pramod Prabhakar is an Indian politician and a leader of the Communist Party of India (CPI) from Bihar. He is a member of the CPI's National Council and Bihar State Secretariat.

He is also associated with the All India Kisan Sabha (AIKS), the farmers' organisation affiliated with the CPI, and serves as its National Secretary. He was elected to the post at the organisation's 30th National Conference in April 2025.

Prabhakar has been involved in the party's organisational activities, political campaigns and farmers' movements in Bihar. He has addressed demonstrations concerning agricultural policies, farmers' rights, land issues, inflation and employment.
