= M. Farooqui =

Indian politician (1920–1997)

Muqimuddin Farooqui (25 March 1920 – 3 September 1997) was an Indian politician. He was a key leader of the students movement during the Indian independence struggle. As a leader of the Communist Party of India he headed the Delhi unit of the party 1944-1971, and from 1971 onwards he was a national-level leader of the party.

== Student movement ==
Muqimuddin Farooqui was born on 15 March 1920 in Ambehta, Saharanpur district into a modest Muslim family. He hailed from a lineage of pirs who used to serve as tutors for the Mughal emperors. His ancestor Hasan Askari, an advisor to Bahadur Shah Zafar, was hanged by the British for his involvement in the Indian Rebellion of 1857.

He moved to Delhi in 1930 to attend school there. His elder brother took part in the Indian independence movement, and was twice jailed by the British colonial authorities. In 1936, whilst a student at St. Stephen's College, Farooqui too became involved in the independence movement. Farooqui attended the first meeting of the All India Students Federation (AISF), along with Jawaharlal Nehru and Muhammad Ali Jinnah. During his student days he came in contact with Bahal Singh, under whose influence Farooqui became a Marxist. He joined the Communist Party of India in 1940. In 1940 he organized a strike at St. Stephen's College in protest against the arrest of Nehru. Following the strike he was expelled from the College by Delhi University Vice-Chancellor Maurice Gwyer. He would be later be issued a Tamra Patra award for his role in the independence movement. His Delhi University Master's Degree was restored to him in 1989 at a special convocation chaired by Shankar Dayal Sharma.

Farooqui was elected general secretary of AISF in 1941. In 1941 he was arrested for the first time, for a speech he had given in Calcutta. He was arrested again during the Quit India movement: In 1946 he was arrested for having called for a boycott of the Victory Parade (held to celebrate Allied victory in World War II).

== Communist Party leader ==
The first CPI Delhi party conference held in 1944 elected Farooqui as the secretary of the Delhi party unit. He served in this position until 1971, when he switched to work at the national CPI Party Centre. He was elected to the CPI National Council in 1958. He joined the CPI National Executive in 1974, and the CPI National Secretariat in 1982.

He became a member of the interim Metropolitan Council of Delhi in 1966. In 1990 he was included in the National Integration Council of the Government of India.

== Family and friendships ==
Married to Vimla Kapoor (who took the name Vimla Farooqui), a fellow activist in AISF and who later became a leader of the National Federation of Indian Women (NFIW). The couple had one son. Farooqui was noted for humble life-style, living in a one-room apartment near Jama Masjid from 1952 onwards and travelling to work by public transport until 1988. He would always dress in simple garb (white homespun pyjama, kurta). In early 1997 Prime Minister H. D. Dewe Gowda offered him to become Governor of an Indian state of his choosing, but M. Farooqui declined the offer.

As an AISF leader he befriended I. K. Gujral, who led the AISF Punjab unit, and the two would form a life-long friendship. Farooqui was noted for fostering strong relations with a wide array of political leaders; such as V.P. Singh, G.K. Moopanar, Farooq Abdullah, Madan Lal Khurana and Murli Manohar Joshi. He was the political mentor of future Afghan President Mohammad Najibullah, during the latter's stay for medical studies in India.

== Death ==
On 3 September 1997 he suffered a heart attack whilst delivering a speech at a seminar of the Rajiv Gandhi Foundation in Delhi. He died shortly thereafter at the Ram Manohar Lohia Hospital.
