= Shambhu Sharan Shrivastava =

Indian politician

Dr. Shambhu Sharan Shrivastava is a Bihar politician who was a former leader of Samata Party (now led by Uday Mandal its President) and Janata Dal (United). He was sacked from the Janata Dal (United) in 2011 due to anti party activities. He was member of Bihar Legislative Council. Later he formed the Lok Aawaz Dal party. He is a former president of the All India Students Federation.
