= All India Youth Federation =

Youth organisation in India

- Abbreviation: AIYF
- Formation: 3 May 1959 (67 years ago), New Delhi
- Type: Youth organisation
- Headquarters: 4/7, Asaf Ali Road, Delhi
- General Secretary: Sukhjinder Mahesari
- President: Raushan Kumar Sinha
- Main organ: Youth Life
- Affiliations: World Federation of Democratic Youth (WFDY)
- Website: www.aiyf.in

The All India Youth Federation (AIYF) is a nation-wide youth organisation in India. Whilst nominally non-partisan, AIYF functions as the youth wing of the Communist Party of India (CPI). The organisation is a member of the World Federation of Democratic Youth (WFDY).

== History ==
The All India Youth Federation was founded in 1959 with the stated aim of uniting all democratic forces in the youth movement of India to defend national independence and sovereignty, mobilize young men and women for active participation in national reconstruction, and fight for democratic rights and vital interests of the younger generation. The founding conference of the All India Youth Federation was held at Constantia Hall in New Delhi between April 28 and May 3, 1959. On April 28, 1959 the mayor of Delhi Aruna Asaf Ali inaugurated the conference. Her speech was followed by an address by guest of honour Dr. Gyan Chand. On April 29, 1959 speeches were held by Law Minister Ashoke Kumar Sen, Professor Hiren Mukherji and Member of Parliament Prasad Rao.

The first AIYF conference was attended by 250 delegates and observers, representing eleven states. There were foreign guests present, such as the general secretary of the World Federation of Democratic Youth (WFDY) and the first secretary of the Indonesian youth movement Pemuda Rakjat. Fraternal delegations from Indian organisations such as Bharat Yuvak Sangh, the All India Students Federation, the Federation of Indian Youth, the All India Rural Youth Association and the Students Union of Calcutta University attended the event. Messages were sent the conference from Indian Vice President Radhakrishnan, the mayor of Bombay, the All China Federation of Youth, the Committee of Soviet Youth Organisations, the Iraqi Youth League, the British Youth Festival Committee and organisations from France, Italy and Jordan.

At the time of the conference, the organisation claimed 200,000 members. The founding conference of AIYF adopted a constitution and a policy statement, affirming that AIYF would have an independent character and no affiliation to any political party. The conference outlined that the goals of the organisation were to carry out democratic changes in the country, providing assistance in the consistent implementation of agrarian reform, developing the struggle for the democratization of education, for the improvement of the situation of youth in the city and village and for the elimination of the caste system.

Various resolutions were adopted - a statement wishing the Geneva Conference success, a statement on solidarity with colonised peoples, a statement calling on the Indian government to step up efforts for Goa liberation and a statement calling for addressing unemployment whilst framing the Third Five-Year Plan, and so forth. The conference resolved to affiliate the organisation to the World Federation of Democratic Youth (WFDY). The conference decided to observe May 16, 1959 as Anti-U.S.-Pak Pact Day by holding rallies across the country, to prepare for the 7th World Festival of Youth and Students by organising local and state-level youth festivals, to organise a solidarity campaign for Algerian youth, to hold regional seminars on education and sports and to begin publishing a monthly bulletin.

The conference elected a 121-member Council. Immediately after the conference the Council was convened, and elected a 37-member Executive Committee with office bearers. Film and stage actor Balraj Sahni was elected as the AIYF president. Five vice presidents were elected P.K. Vasudevan Nair (Kerala, Member of Parliament and chairman of the AIYF Executive Committee), Chintamani Panigrahi (Orissa, Member of Parliament), Sukumar Gupta (West Bengal), Kishan Chander Chaudhuri (Bihar) and Satyananarayana (Andhra). Sarada Mitra was elected AIYF general secretary. There were five posts for secretaries - Sushil Chakravarty (Bombay), Ganesh Vidyarthi (Bihar) and Desraj Goel (Delhi) were elected secretaries, with two secretary posts remaining empty to be filled by the Andhra and West Bengal units respectively. The Delhi unit of AIYF was asked to nominate a treasurer.

In April 1961 AIYF began publishing the journal New Generation. The second conference of AIYF was held in Hyderabad May 19-21, 1961. 306 delegates and observers, representing 12 states, took part in the conference. Foreign guests at the conference included WFDY, the Czechoslovak Youth Union and the Sri Lanka Freedom Party Youth League. Fraternal delegations from India participating as guests at the conference included AISF, the Youth Hostels Association, the Socialist Youth League, the All India Kisan Sabha and the All India Trade Union Congress. The conference lamented the refusal of the Youth Department of the All India Congress Committee and World Assembly of Youth to attend the meeting.

A 121-member Council was elected unanimously by the conference. The newly-elected Council elected a 37-member Executive Committee. New offices bearers were P.K. Vasudevan Nair (president), Sarada Mitra (general secretary), six vice presidents, five secretaries and a treasurer. At the end of the conference a mass rally was held, with speeches from Rajinder Singh Bedi and foreign guests.

In Punjab, were AIYF had 18,000 members, AIYF organised volunteer labour for the construction of a half mile long canal, enabling the irrigation of an area of 3,000 acres of farm land.

AIYF was weakened by the split in the CPI, and its membership was estimated at nearly 100,000 by the mid-1960s. In the wake of the CPI split, the third national conference of AIYF was held in Pondicherry, December 29, 1965 to January 2, 1966. The national conference of AISF was also held in Pondicherry in parallel. Prior to the conferences Sarada Mitra and AISF general secretary Hiren Dasgupta conducted a joint tour of states across the country. The All Union Leninist Young Communist League (VLKSM) from the Soviet Union sent an 8-member delegation to the AIYF and AISF conferences, led by the VLKSM secretary Yury Torsuyev.

In the mid-1960s, the AIYF developed a more ambivalent relationship with Congress politics, led by the increasingly radical reforms undertaken by Indira Gandhi. The expulsion of Indira Gandhi from Congress and subsequent formation of the Indian National Congress (Requisitionists), more commonly known as INC(R), led to a closer relationship between AIYF and said faction of Congress, although not one that was marked by universal agreement.

During the first half of 1969 AIYF and AISF organised a joint campaign against unemployment, with four jathas (protest caravans) departing Kerala, Bombay, Bihar and Punjab. The jatha converged in Delhi on May 13, 1969, with a number of rallies held in the capital over the following days. On May 15, 1969 a march to the parliament of India resulted in numerous arrests. The fourth national conference of AIYF opened on December 23, 1969, with CPI chairman S.A. Dange addressing the gathering.

The 17th national conference of AIYF was held in Tirupati in 2025, at which Raushan Kumar Sinha was elected AIYF president, Sukhjinder Mahesari general secretary, Bharathi, Pradeep Sethi, Himanshu and Arthi Redekar as vice presidents and TT Jismon, Harish Bala, Dr. Syed Valli Ullah Khadiri and Parchuru Rajendra Babu as secretaries.
