= A. V. Aryan =

Indian politician

1967 -1970
- In office 3 years
- Preceded by: P. R. Francis
- Succeeded by: P. R. Francis
- Constituency: Ollur Assembly Constituency

Personal details
- Born: Thrissur, Kerala
- Died: 1 February 2007
- Party: Communist Party of India (Marxist)
- Children: 2 sons and 1 daughter

A. V. Aryan (died 1 February 2007) was a Communist Party of India (Marxist) politician from Thrissur and Member of the Legislative Assembly from Ollur Assembly Constituency in 1967.
