= Raghavan Pozhakadavil =

Indian politician

1980, 1982
- In office 5 years
- Preceded by: P. R. Francis
- Succeeded by: A.M. Paraman
- Constituency: Ollur Assembly Constituency

Personal details
- Born: Thrissur, Kerala
- Party: Indian National Congress

Raghavan Pozhakadavil is an Indian National Congress politician from Thrissur and Member of the Legislative Assembly from Ollur Assembly Constituency in 1980 and 1982.
