= Dasari Nagabhushana Rao =

Indian politician

- Died: April 28, 2008
- Spouse: Namburi Paripurna

Dasari Nagabhushana Rao (died April 28, 2008) was an Indian politician and leader of Communist Party of India. He served as the CPI Andhra Pradesh state secretary from 1992 to 1997. He was elected as Rajya Sabha member in 1998 and also served as the CPI National Secretariat member. He had started his political career as a student by joining the All India Students’ Federation. He was the General secretary of AISF from 1953 to 1955.

The Communist Party of India Andhra pradesh State headquarters, Dasari Nagabhushana Rao Bhavan, is named in his honor.
