= Pananchery =

- village
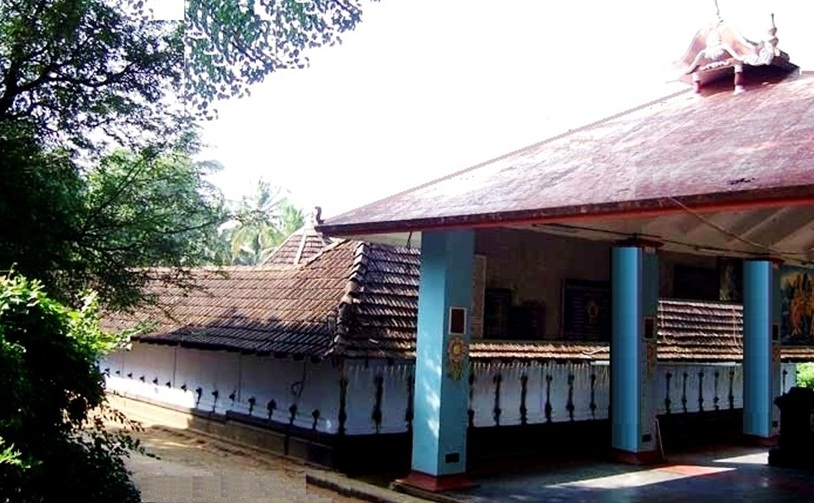
- Mudikkode Shiva temple
- Interactive map of Pananchery
- Coordinates: 10.556°N 76.308°E
- Country: India
- State: Kerala
- District: Thrissur

Population (2011)
  - Total: 19,832

Languages
  - Official: Malayalam, English
- Time zone: UTC+5:30 (IST)
- PIN: 680652
- Vehicle registration: KL-08

Pananchery is a village and gram panchayat in Thrissur district in the state of Kerala, India. It is located along the National Highway ( NH47) from Thrissur to Palakkad. Peechi, Pattikad, Kannara are located in Pananchery.

== Demographics ==
As of 2011 India census, Pananchery had a population of 19832 with 9656 males and 10176 females.

== Local government ==
Pananchery is the second-largest panchayath in the Thrissur district by area. It consists of 24 wards: Pananchery (village), Chembutra, Pattikkad, Thanippadam, Poovanchira, Chuvannamannu, Vanniyampara, Kombazha, Vazhukkumpara, Thekkumpadam, Edappalam, Mailuttumpara,Podipara, Peechi, Thamaravellachal, Vilangannoor, Kannara, Veendassary, Payannam, Marakkal, Koottala, Alppara, Chirakkunnu and Mudikkode.

== Places of interest ==
The Kerala Forest Research Institute (KFRI), the popular tourist spot of Peechi Dam and the Kerala Engineering Research Institute (KERI) are located in Pananchery. The Peechi reservoir supplies water to the Thrissur town besides providing water for irrigation to the region. Kannara plantain research centre Kannara. Two government higher secondary schools (Pattikkad GHSS and Peechi GHSS) are situated in this panchayath. Chief minister Mr.Pinarayi Vijayan inaugurated "Honey and Banana Park" on 23 September 2019. Makarachovva maholsavam is celebrated every year .

== Education ==
- St. Alphonsa Public School, Pattikkad
- Jeevan jyothi Public School, Thalikkode
- Teams College of IT and Management, Pananchery
- Kailasanadha Vidhya Nikethan, Mullakkara
- Common Service Centre (Infotech Computer Centre)
- St. Marys Public School, Kombazha
- Sree Badhra Vidhya Mandir, Chemboothra
- Sree Narayana Guru College of Advanced Studies, Vazhukumpara
