= Hemu Kalani =

Indian freedom fighter (1923–1943)

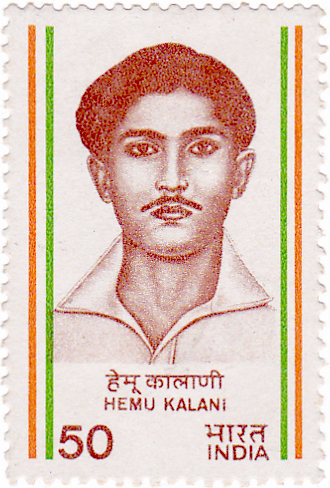
- Kalani on a 1983 stamp of India
- Born: 23 March 1923; Sukkur, Bombay Presidency, British India, now Pakistan.
- Died: 21 January 1943 (aged 19); Sukkur, Sind Province, British India, now Pakistan
- Cause of death: Execution by hanging
- Occupations: Revolutionary leader, freedom fighter, political activist
- Organization: All India Students Federation
- Movement: Indian Independence Movement

Hemandas Kalani (Sindhi: هيمو ڪالاڻي, 23 March 1923 – 21 January 1943) was an Indian revolutionary and anti-colonial figure during the Indian independence movement. He was a leader of Swaraj Sena, a student organisation which was affiliated with All India Students Federation (AISF). He was one of the youngest revolutionaries to be martyred for the nation's freedom struggle, being executed by the British colonial authorities when he was only 19, two months before his 20th birthday.

== Early life ==
Hemu Kalani was born in a Sindhi family at Sukkur in Sind Division of Bombay Presidency in British India (now in Pakistan) on 23 March 1923. (His birthday coincides with the day Bhagat Singh, Sukhdev & Rajguru were hanged). He was son of Pesumal Kalani and Jethi Bai. As a child and young man he campaigned with his friends for boycotts of foreign goods and tried to persuade people to use Swadeshi goods. He was drawn to revolutionary activities and started participating in acts of protests with the aim of driving out the British from the Indian subcontinent.

== Freedom struggle ==
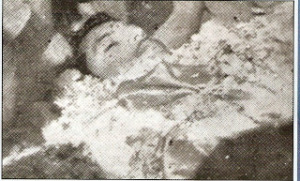
Funeral of Hemu Kalani, 21 January 1943

Hemu Kalani joined Mahatma Gandhi's Quit India movement when it was started in 1942. Support for the movement in Sindh was such that the British colonial authorities had to send military detachments after him consisting of European battalions. Hemu Kalani found out that a train of these troops and their supplies would be passing through his local town at the midnight of 22 October and decided to derail it by removing the fishplates from the railway track. This despite the fact that neither he nor his colleagues had the necessary tools and so had to use a rope as a means to loosen the fixings.

They were seen by the British before being able to complete the sabotage. Hemu was caught, imprisoned, and tortured by the Indian Imperial Police in an attempt to get him to reveal the names of his co-conspirators. He refused to divulge any information, was put on trial and sentenced to death. The people of Sindh petitioned the Viceroy for mercy but the condition of granting it was that the authorities must be told the identity of his co-conspirators. He again refused to pass on the information and he was hanged on 21 January 1943.

It is said that Hemu Kalani was so happy upon being handed the death sentence that, contrary to usual, he gained a good deal of weight during the time between his sentencing and his execution. On the day of his execution, he appeared extremely overjoyed, and walked to the gallows with a copy of the Bhagavad Gita in his hands, smiling and humming the whole way.

== Legacy ==
=== India ===
- Statue instituted of Hemu Kalani at Hemu Kalani Square Jaripatka, Nagpur, Maharashtra.
- Sant Hidaram Nagar (Bairagarh) Bhopal.

Statue, institutions and many more name of the Shaheed Hemu Kalani.

- Rewa city in M.P -

Hemu Kalani Chowk Rewa.

- Agra city in U.P -

Hemu Kalani Statue near Sadar Tehsil, Hemu Kalani road, Agra. Statue erected by Agra Sindhi Samaj & Hemu Kalani Murti Sthapana Samiti, Agra.

- Adipur city in Kutch, Gujarat, has also Hemu Kalani Statue near Gandhi Samadhi, Maitri School road.
- Bhilwara city, In Sindhunagar Colony has erected Statue of Shaheed Hemu Kalani at the crossing of the road (chowk). Called Hemu Kalani Circle.
- Tonk city (Rajasthan) has erected a statue of Young Martyr Hemu Kalani at the Sawai Madhopur Circle.
- Ahmedabad city (Gujarat) has erected Statue of Amar Shaheed Shree Hemu Kalani at the Rajavir Circle.
- Indore city has named a road intersection after Hemu Kalani and placed his statue at the center of the intersection.
- Faizabad city has named a National Parks in His Name and a Faizabad to Ayodhya HWY A National Libraries in Ayodhya.
- A statue of Hemu Kalani is located in the Parliament complex in front of the Deputy Speaker's office
- Chembur, a suburb of Mumbai with a large Sindhi population, has Hemu Kalani Marg named after the famous freedom fighter.
- In Ulhasnagar Statue of Shaheed Hemu Kalani has been erected at the crossing of the road (chowk).
- Jodhpur city (Rajasthan) has named a road intersection after Hemu Kalani and placed his statue at the center of the intersection.
- Ajmer city (Rajasthan) has erected Statue of Shaheed Hemu Kalani at the Diggi Bazar Chowk.
- Ajmer city (Rajasthan) has a locality in Lakhan Kothri called Hemu Kalani Mohalla.
- Delhi city (Lajpat Nagar), located a senior secondary school named Shaheed Hemu Kalani Sarvodaya Bal Vidyalaya.
- Delhi city (Pitampura), Veer Hemu Marg and a street named "shaheed hemu kalani marg" In old Rajendra Nagar, Karol Bag, New Delhi.
- Kanpur city, has a park named Hemu Kalani park located in the Sindhi Colony area named after Shaheed Hemu Kalani.
- Kota city, has a community hall Hemu Kalani Samudayik Bhawan located in the Sahjidera area named after Shaheed Hemu Kalani.
- Dhule city in Maharashtra has Shaheed Hemu Kalani Road.
- Amalner city in Maharashtra has Shaheed Hemu Kalani Road.
- Pimpri-Chinchwad city in Maharashtra has a children's park named Hemu Kalani Garden and society named Hemu Kalani Housing Society located in Pimpri.
- Bhilwara city in Rajasthan has a Road Square in Sindhu Nagar named as Hemu Kalani Chowk.
- Bilaspur city in Chhattisgarh has a locality named after him called Hemu Nagar.
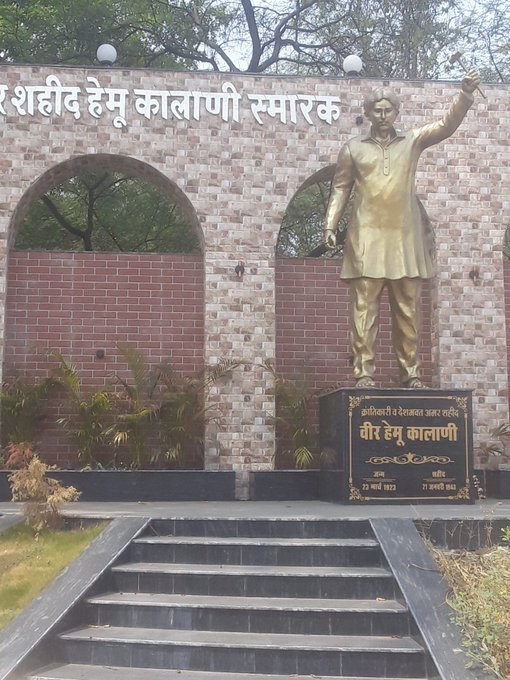
  Hemu Kalani Statue in Durg, Chhattisgarh
- Neemuch city in Madhya Pradesh has a Road Square named Hemu Kalani Chowk with an erected Statue of Shaheed Hemu Kalani.
- Bikaner city (Rajasthan) has named a road intersection after Hemu Kalani and placed his statue at the center of the intersection.
- A poem " Hemu Kalani" was written on 25 January 1943 by Indra Bahadur Khare, just 4 days after Hemu's hanging, and it is published in 2017 after a span of 74 years.
- The Raipur city of Chhattisgarh has a square in the main street called Hemu Kalani Chowk.
- Shaheed Hemu Kalani education society is run in Sant Hirdaram Nagar Bhopal.
- Raipur city of Chhattisgarh has a Community Hall near Lakhe Nagar Area called Amar Shaheed Hemu Kalani Bhawan.
- Korba city of Chhattisgarh has a Big community hall near the Rani Road area called Amar Shaheed Hemu Kalani Dharamshala.
- Bhavnagar city in Gujarat has a Road Square at Gopal Park in Sindhunagar has erected Statue of Amar Shaheed Hemu Kalani at the crossing of the road (chowk) named as Hemu Kalani Circle on 21 January 2020.
- Chittorgarh, Rajasthan has an intersection named after Shaheed Hemu Kalani Chauraha which was previously known as Pratap Nagar Chauraha.
- Jalgaon, Maharashtra has a garden, Park Named "Hemu Kalani Bagicha" behind Sindhi Colony, Kanwar Nagar, Near Joshi Colony, Jalgaon-425001.
- Belagavi, Hemi Kalani chowk near Daak bungalow, a circle named after him.
- Ujjain, M.P. Statue of Hemu Kalani erected at Park Named "Choithram Gidwani Udyan", Situated at Sindhi Colony, Sanwer Road, Freeganj, UJJAIN (M.P.)-456001.
- Khairthal, Rajasthan has an intersection named after Shaheed Hemu Kalani Chauraha.
- Rajnandgaon, Chhattisgarh has Hemu Kalani Road.
- Tilda Newra, Chhattisgarh has Hemu Kalani Chowk.
- Durg, Chhattisgarh has Hemu Kalani Statue.

=== Pakistan ===
- Hemu Kalani Park, Sukkur, Pakistan – However was later renamed to Qasim Park.

Hemu Kalani has been unfortunately largely forgotten in Pakistan, being entirely absent from history books, except from the Sindh Province in Pakistan where he was born and raised in.
