= A. M. Paraman =

Indian politician

Member of Kerala Legislative Assembly
- In office 1987-1991
- Preceded by: Raghavan Pozhakadavil
- Succeeded by: P. P. George
- Constituency: Ollur

Personal details
- Born: 20 October 1926 Punkunnam, Thrissur, Kingdom of Cochin, British India
- Died: 11 June 2018 (aged 91) Punkunnam, Thrissur, Kerala, India
- Party: Communist Party of India
- Spouse: Madhavi
- Children: 1 son and 2 daughters

A. M. Paraman (20 October 1926 – 11 June 2018) was a veteran Communist Party of India politician from Thrissur and Member of the Legislative Assembly from Ollur Assembly Constituency from 1987 to 1992.

Aeinivalappil Madhavan Paraman was born in Punkunnam, Thrissur on 20 October 1926 as the son of Aeinivalappil Madhavan and Chittaththuparambil Lakshmi. After completing primary education, at the age of 14, he joined Sitharam mills, Punkunnam. As an employee of Sitaram Mills, Paraman successfully united the employees and began his political life from there. He became the leader of trade unions and employees' unions at Rajagopal Mills, Alagappa textiles, etc., along with earthen-tile manufacturing unit employees in the district. He worked as member of the Communist Party of India State Council and State President of AITUC. He was councillor in Thrissur municipality for 30 years. Due to age related ailments, he died on 11 June 2018.
