= Namburi Paripurna =

Telugu writer (1931–2024)

- నంబూరి పరిపూర్ణ (Telugu)
- Born: July 1, 1931 (age 95)
- Died: January 26, 2024 (aged 92); Bengaluru
- Occupations: Writer, Actor, Teacher
- Spouse: Dasari Nagabhushana Rao
- Children: Sireesha, Amarendra and Shailendra
- Writing career
- Language: Telugu

Namburi Paripurna (1 July 1931 – 26 January 2024) was a Telugu writer who published short stories, novels and essays for over 50 years. Her Telugu autobiography "Velugu Daarulalo". was published in 2017.

== Early life and career ==
Namburi Paripurna was born in Bommuluru village of Krishna District in Andhra Pradesh, India to Namburi Lakshmayya and Namburi Lakshmamma, on 1 July 1931. Her primary education happened in Krishna District, and high school education in Rajamundry and Madras. After studying further briefly in P.R.College, Kakinada, she was trained to be a teacher and earn a B.A. degree through distance education.

Paripurna was a student activist with the Communist party of India during 1944-49, and experienced confinement and underground life as a Communist activist during 1950-52.

Paripurna was an actor in the past and actively performed in Telugu dramas as a child. She acted as Prahlada in the 1942 Telugu movie Bhakta Prahlada, directed by Chitrapu Narayana Murthy. She also played a role in a Telugu tele-film "Iddaru Okkate" directed by Akkineni Kutumba Rao in 1986. A collection of her Telugu songs appeared as an album "Swara Purnima", under the music direction of Sarraju Prasanna Kumar in 2004.

== Personal life and death ==
Paripurna was married to a Communist leader Dasari Nagabhushana Rao and has three children: Sireesha, Amarendra and Shailendra, of which the first two are also Telugu writers of repute. She started her professional life as a teacher in 1955 and later worked for three decades as a state government employee, before retiring in 1989.

Paripurna died in Bengaluru on 26 January 2024, at the age of 92.

== Writings ==
- Maaku raavu suryodayalu (We will not have sunrises), novella, 1985.
- Untayi maku ushassulu (We will see the dawn), short stories, 1998.
- Katha Paripurnam, short stories (jointly with her children), 2006.
- Sikhararohana (Climbing the summit), essays and short stories, 2016.
- Velugu Daarulalo (In the path of light), Autobiography, 2017.
- Polimera (The Boundary), Novel, 2018.

A short story by Namburi Paripurna "Tirigi Pravasaniki" was translated into English as "Returning Home".
