= All India Students' Federation =

Student organisation in India

Coordinates: 28°38′28″N 77°14′05″E

- AISF Flag
- Abbreviation: AISF
- Formation: 12 August 1936 (90 years ago), Lucknow, United Province, British India
- Type: Student organisation
- Purpose: Scientific socialism
- Headquarters: 4/7, Asaf Ali Road, New Delhi-110002, India
- Location: India
- President: Viraaj Devang
- General Secretary: Dinesh Sreerangaraj
- Main organ: Student's Action
- Affiliations: Communist Party of India (CPI); World Federation of Democratic Youth (WFDY); International Union of Students (IUS)

The All India Students' Federation (AISF) is the oldest student organisation in India, founded in 1936.

== Pre-independence ==
AISF was founded on 12 August 1936 at a conference in Lucknow, with the backing of leaders from Indian independence movement. The foundation conference of the AISF was held at Ganga Prasad Memorial Hall with 936 delegates from across India. The conference was inaugurated by Jawaharlal Nehru, and presided over by Muhammad Ali Jinnah. The conference resolved to establish the federation and Prem Narayan Bhargava was elected as the first general secretary.

The second conference of the AISF was held three months later, beginning on 22 November 1936 in Lahore. It mainly discussed and adopted the constitution of the AISF. The conference was attended by about 150 delegates under the presidency of Sarat Chandra Bose. The conference was also addressed by Govind Ballabh Pant. It passed a resolution condemning the intervention by Nazi Germany into the affairs of Republican Spain. The conference also agreed to affiliate the AISF with the World Students' Association.

Hemu Kalani, an AISF leader, was arrested by the British army in 1942 for leading the Quit India Movement, and publicly hanged in 1943 at the age of 19. AISF leader Kanaklata Barua was another student leader who died participating in the fight for independence.

An AISF delegation visited the Bengal state during the famine of 1943 and engaged in relief activities.

During the Royal Indian Navy mutiny in Bombay in February 1946, the AISF helped to mobilise students in support of the Naval Ratings.

== AISF in Quit India Movement ==
- Hemu Kalani, an AISF activist from Sindh, who was arrested by the British during the Quit India Movement and later executed. The article presents him as one of the prominent student martyrs of the movement.
- In the United Provinces (UP), AISF activists such as Sarjoo Pandey organised resistance. The article describes protests, underground activities, arrests and repression by the British.
- At Banaras Hindu University (BHU), AISF and other student groups participated in demonstrations and strikes. The article notes cooperation between different student organisations despite their ideological differences.
- In Bihar, AISF leaders including Chandrasekhar Singh, Rahul Sankrityayan and Indradeep Sinha were attending an AISF conference when the Quit India Movement began. The conference subsequently became a centre for discussion and mobilisation.
- A large student demonstration in Patna on 12 August 1942, followed by police repression, including lathi-charge and firing. It names several AISF activists who were arrested or injured.
- AISF participation in Satara, where Nana Patil's Prati Sarkar emerged as an important parallel/underground nationalist administration. Students and peasants reportedly formed an important part of its underground network.
- AISF activists from Bihar, Ahmedabad and other regions participating in demonstrations, underground organisation, distribution of revolutionary literature and resistance to British rule.

== AISF in independent India ==
After independence, the AISF concentrated its activities mainly on educational issues, anti-imperialism and anti-feudalism, providing a platform for student unity against common threats. The AISF played a central role in the Telangana Rebellion against the Nizam of Hyderabad.

The AISF continued to fight for Indian unity with the Goa liberation movement. Satyagrahis from across India entered Goa on 15 August 1955 and were fired upon. 23-year-old Karnail Singh Benipal was killed when he tried to save his leader V. D. Chitale. The general secretary of the AISF, Sukhendu Mazumdar, was present with AISF leader C. K. Chandrappan on 15 August at the Goa border to help the student satyagrahis.

The AISF participated in the Kothari Commission report, which provided the basis for broad educational reforms in India.

In the 1980s, during the Khalistan movement, the AISF, under the leadership of General Secretary Satyapal Dang, received armed training to counter Khalistan militants. Harpal Mohali, the AISF leader from Mohali, led movements in Panjab University. In response to his attempt to counter Khalistan, Mohali was shot by militants and left paralysed. Many AISF activists were killed fighting against Khalistan separatism.

== State-level presence ==
The AISF has a strong presence in Kerala, Bihar, West Bengal, Tripura, Telangana, Andhra Pradesh, Tamil Nadu, Karnataka, Rajasthan, Assam, Odisha, Uttar Pradesh, Maharashtra, New Delhi, and Punjab, and in most universities in the country.

== Activities ==
=== Protest and demands ===
- The AISF protested against the National Education Policy in 2019 and the proposed increase in university fees.
- AISF members were active in multiple Citizenship Amendment Act protests in 2019.
- During the COVID-19 pandemic in India, AISF activists called for the distribution of essential products in various states. The federation set up COVID-19 helpline numbers in various states to help students, and also distributed facemasks and hand sanitiser.
- The AISF held a hunger strike in August 2021, demanding a fresh job calendar in Andhra Pradesh. The federation has also campaigned against the privatisation of schools and colleges in the state.
- AISF activists protested against alleged errors in results of the Railway Recruitment Control Board's Non-Technical Popular Categories (RRCB NTPC) exam, during Bihar Bandh, in Patna on 28 January 2022.
- The AISF organised a national convention, "Reject NEP 2020" against the National Education Policy (NEP) on 15 May 2022 in Chennai. The convention called for a united front of students and teachers of all educational institutions for the withdrawal of the NEP, the National Eligibility-cum-Entrance Test (NEET) and the Common University Entrance Test (CUET).

=== 2026 Neet Protest ===
During the 2026 protests concerning the alleged leak and cancellation of the NEET-UG examination, AISF participated in demonstrations and mobilisation activities in support of affected students. AISF activists joined protests demanding accountability for alleged irregularities in the examination process, action against those responsible for paper leaks, and reforms aimed at ensuring the transparency and credibility of public examinations. The organisation also called for the resignation of Union Education Minister Dharmendra Pradhan and raised concerns regarding the functioning of the National Testing Agency (NTA). In several locations, AISF coordinated with other student and youth organisations and participated in solidarity protests connected with the wider student movement. AISF activists were reported to have taken part in demonstrations in Chennai and Mumbai, while the organisation also helped coordinate the participation of students and supporters from Maharashtra in protests in Delhi. Through protest marches, demonstrations, public campaigns and organisational mobilisation, AISF contributed to expanding the issue beyond individual examination centres and linking it to wider concerns regarding examination security, accountability and the rights of students.

=== Hindu-symbolism disputes ===
In July 2025, Kerala's Governor displayed a portrait of Bharat Mata at an official university function, AISF treated this as a political overreach by the Governor into his role as a university Chancellor.

AISF activists breached police barricades to enter the campus demanding the portrait's removal, threatening to block the Governor if it stayed, and stand-off resulted in a clash with the organizers. The Kerala High Court later weighed in on the issue, with a judge questioning "How Bharat Mata could be classified as a religious symbol?"

=== Other social work ===
The AISF runs Sramajibi Canteen and is involved in various other social work.

=== LGBT issues ===
The AISF actively supports LGBT rights. In 2022, AISF state committee member Nadira Mehrin became the first transgender person to contest in a student union election at Kerala University, and also contested as the AISF candidate for chairperson of Sree Sankaracharya University of Sanskrit (SSUS), the first time a transgender person had led a candidates' panel for a university election in the state.

== Motto and organisational structure ==
The organisation's original motto, reflecting its focus on peace, progress and scientific socialism, was "Freedom, Peace and Progress". This was amended at the 1958 National Convention, and the motto since then has been "Study & Struggle".

The administrative structure of the federation includes:

1. National executive body
2. State executive body
3. State administrative body
4. District administrative body
5. Block level committee
6. Institutions level unions

National Conference	Year	Place	President	General Secretary
1 (Founder Conference)	12–13 August 1936	Lucknow (Uttar Pradesh)		Prem Narayan Bhargava
2	22 November 1936	Lahore		Prem Narayan Bhargava
3	1–3 January 1938	Madras		Ansar Harvani
4	1–2 January 1939	Calcutta		M.L.Shah
5	1–2 January 1940	Delhi		M.L.Shah
6	25–26 December 1940	Nagpur		M. Farooqui
7	31 December 1941 to 1 January 1942	Patna		Perin Chandra
				Prashanta Sanyal
8	28–31 December 1944	Calcutta		Satyapal Dang
9	20 January 1946	Guntur		Satyapal Dang
10	3 January 1947	Delhi		Annada Shankar Bhattacharya
11	29–31 December 1947	Bombay	Satyapal Dang	Annada Shankar Bhattacharya
12	23–27 July 1949	Calcutta	Susheela Madiman	Annada Shankar Bhattacharya
	1950	Calcutta	Susheela Madiman	Sukhendu Mazumdar (Acting general secretary)
	1952	Calcutta	Susheela Madiman	Annada Shankar Bhattacharya
13	1–5 January 1953	Hyderabad	Harish Chandra Tiwari	N.R. Dasari
14	5–8 January 1955	Lucknow	B. Narsingha Rao	Sukhendu Mazumdar
15	2–4 January 1959	Udaipur	Vidyasagar Nautiyal	Hiren Dasgupta
16	25–27 October 1961, but it could not be held due to natural disaster	Kanpur		
17	29 December 1965 – 2 January 1966	Pondicherry	Joginder Singh Dayal	S. Sudhakar Reddy
18	21–23 December 1969	New Delhi	Bant Singh Brar	Ranjit Guha
19	20 January 1974	Cochin	Shambhu Sharan Shrivastava	Aziz Pasha
20	1–9 February 1979	Ludhiana	Atul Kumar Anjan	Amarjeet Kaur
21	28–31 January 1983	Trichy	Atul Kumar Anjan	Amarjeet Kaur
22	13–16 December 1985	Guntur	Ravindra Nath Rai	T. Laxminarayana
23	15–18 February 1991	Bokaro	Ravindra Nath Rai	Soni Thengamom
24	7–9 February 1996	Hyderabad	Rahul Bhaiji	T. Srinivas
25	18–21 October 2000	Jalandhar	T. Srinivas, Ramakrushna Panda	Vijendra Kesari
26	3–6 January 2006	Chennai	P. Muralidhar, Jinu Zakariya Oommen	Vijendra Kesari
27	13-15 February 2010	Puducherry	Paramjit Dhaban	Abhay Taksal
28	28–30 November 2013	Hyderabad	Valli Ullah Khadri	Vishwajeet Kumar
29	27–30 September 2018	Anantapur, Andhra Pradesh	Shuvam Banerjee	Vicky Mahesari
30	28–1 September–October 2023	Begusarai	Vicky Mahesari Viraaj Devang	Dinesh Sreerangaraj

== Present leadership ==
At the 30th AISF National Conference, held in September to October 2023 in Begusarai, Bihar, Vicky Mahesari from Punjab was elected as National President and Dinesh Seerangaraj from Tamil Nadu was elected as General Secretary. Veeraboina Mahesh Yadav is President of All India Students' Federation at Ghatkesar, Medchal, Telangana.

On 30 June 2024, Viraaj Devang from Maharashtra who served as National Treasurer was elected as the new National President.

== Notable leaders ==
- Aruna Asaf Ali- Indian educator
- G. R. Anil - Minister of Food and civil supplies in Kerala
- Atul Kumar Anjan - senior CPI leader and national secretary.
- A. B. Bardhan - Former General secretary of the Communist Party of India
- Kanaklata Barua - Independence activist
- Kirti Nidhi Bista - Prime Minister of Nepal
- C. K. Chandrappan - Parliamentarian
- Satyapal Dang - Former minister in the government of Punjab
- Durga Prasad Dhar - Former foreign minister
- Inder Kumar Gujral - Former Prime Minister of India
- Ali Sardar Jafri - progressive writer
- Hemu Kalani - Sindh independence activist and Student leader, hanged to death by British
- Amarjeet Kaur - General Secretary of All India Trade Union Congress
- Kanhaiya Kumar- Former President of JNUSU and current AICC in-charge of the National Student's Union of India
- V. S. Sunil Kumar - Former Minister of Agriculture in Kerala
- O. N. V. Kurup – Malayalam poet & former leader
- Muhammed Muhsin - Member of the Kerala Legislative Assembly representing Pattambi constituency
- Biswanath Mukherjee - Former leader of the Communist Party of India and one of the founder of AISF in Bengal.
- P. K. Vasudevan Nair - Former Chief Minister of Kerala
- P. Prasad - Minister of Agriculture in Kerala
- D. Raja - Current General secretary of the Communist Party of India.
- K. Rajan - Minister of Revenue in Kerala
- Malayattoor Ramakrishnan – Malayalam writer and former leader
- J. Chinchu Rani - Minister of Animal Husbandry in Kerala
- Rahi Masoom Raza - poet, writer
- Suravaram Sudhakar Reddy - Former General secretary of the Communist Party of India.
- Nandini Satpathy - Ex Minister attached to PM of India and Ex CM of Odisha
- Karpoori Thakur - Former Chief Minister of Bihar
- Rajaji Mathew Thomas - Former Vice-president of World Federation of Democratic Youth (WFDY) and Former MLA in Kerala
- M. Vijayan - Indian structural biologist
- Binoy Viswam - National secretary of AISF and Former minister in the Government of Kerala
- Chandrajit Yadav - former member of parliament
- Sibte Hasan Zaidi - scientist

== See also ==
- List of Indian student organisations
