= Y. V. Krishna Rao =

Indian politician

Member of the Andhra Pradesh Legislative Council
- In office 1966–1978

Personal details
- Born: 15 September 1915 Peda Otupalli, Krishna District, Andhrapradesh
- Died: 26 December 2010 (aged 95)
- Party: Communist Party of India

Y. V. Krishna Rao (1915 September 15–26 December 2010), popularly known as YVK, was an Indian politician and leader of Communist Party of India who served as General Secretary and President of the All India Kisan Sabha.

== Biography ==
He joined the freedom movement early when he was still a child. Later he became an activist of anti-British struggle, and soon he joined the Communist Party of India. He was given the responsibilities of party work in Cuddapah district, where he lived in underground. He played a crucial role in the ongoing Telangana Armed Struggle in Cuddapah district. Later he joined All India Kisan Sabha and dedicated his lifer to the Kisan movement. He was the leader of state Kisan Sabha, and soon became general secretary and then president of All India Kisan Sabha. He was the leader of the CPI Legislative Council group for 12 years and was known for his legislative activities. He was in the state secretariat of the CPI and also in the national executive committee of the party. He was also president of Visalaandhra Vignana Samithi, and had authored many books, edited the Telugu translations of Das Kapital and was co-author of the three volumes of History of Andhra Communist Movement. He was the Chairman of prestigious publication Andhra Pradesh Darshini. He functioned as member of Union Agricultural prices Commission.

He died on 26 December 2010.
