= N. Prasad Rao =

Indian Communist leader

Nanduri Prasada Rao

Rajya Sabha
- In office 30-11-1953 to 2-4-1956

Personal details
- Born: Nandury Durga Mallikarjuna Prasadarao; 24 September 1912 Arugolanu, Gannavaram Taluk, District Krishna
- Died: November 29, 2001 (aged 89) Hyderabad, India
- Party: Communist Party of India (Marxist)
- Spouse: Sumitra
- Children: 1 son
- Parent: Shri Janakiramayya (father)

Nanduri Prasada Rao (Telugu:నండూరి ప్రసాద రావు), born as Nandury Durga Mallikarjuna Prasadarao, was a prominent Communist leader, contributed communist movement in India, he was former member of Indian Parliament upper house Rajya Sabha and former Member of Legislative council (MLC) of Andhra Pradesh. He actively participated in Indian freedom struggle. He was born to Shri Janakiramayya (father).

Prasada Rao one of founding members of the Communist Party of India (Marxist) and Centre of Indian Trade Unions (CITU). He continued to be Central Committee member of CPI (M) till his death. He joined the freedom struggle while studying at the Banaras Hindu University. Inspired by Puchalapalli Sundarayya, he joined the communist party in 1934. He was founder of communist movement along with Puchalapalli Sundarayya, Chandra Rajeswara Rao, Harkishan Singh Surjeet, Makineni Basavapunnaiah and others.

He organised Peasant movement in Munagala. He took part in Telangana Armed struggle known as Telangana Rebellion against Nizam. He wrote books in Telugu language. Prasada Rao was member of Rajya Sabha during (30-11-1953 to 2–4–1956).

He came from an upwardly mobility family but he chose to relinquish material comforts and he led an ascetic life. He died on 29 November 2001 in Hyderabad with brief illness.
