= Eranellur =

- village
- Location in Kerala, India Eranellur (India)
- Coordinates: 10°36′0″N 76°7′0″E
- Country: India
- State: Kerala
- District: Thrissur

Government
  - Type: Panchayati raj (India)
  - Body: Gram panchayat

Population (2011)
  - Total: 10,145

Languages
  - Official: Malayalam, English
- Time zone: UTC+5:30 (IST)
- PIN: 680501
- Vehicle registration: KL-46
- Climate: moderate (Köppen)

Eranellur is a village in Thrissur district in the state of Kerala, India.

== Demographics ==
As of 2011 India census, Eranellur had a population of 10145 with 4735 males and 5410 females.
