= M. P. Vincent =

Indian politician

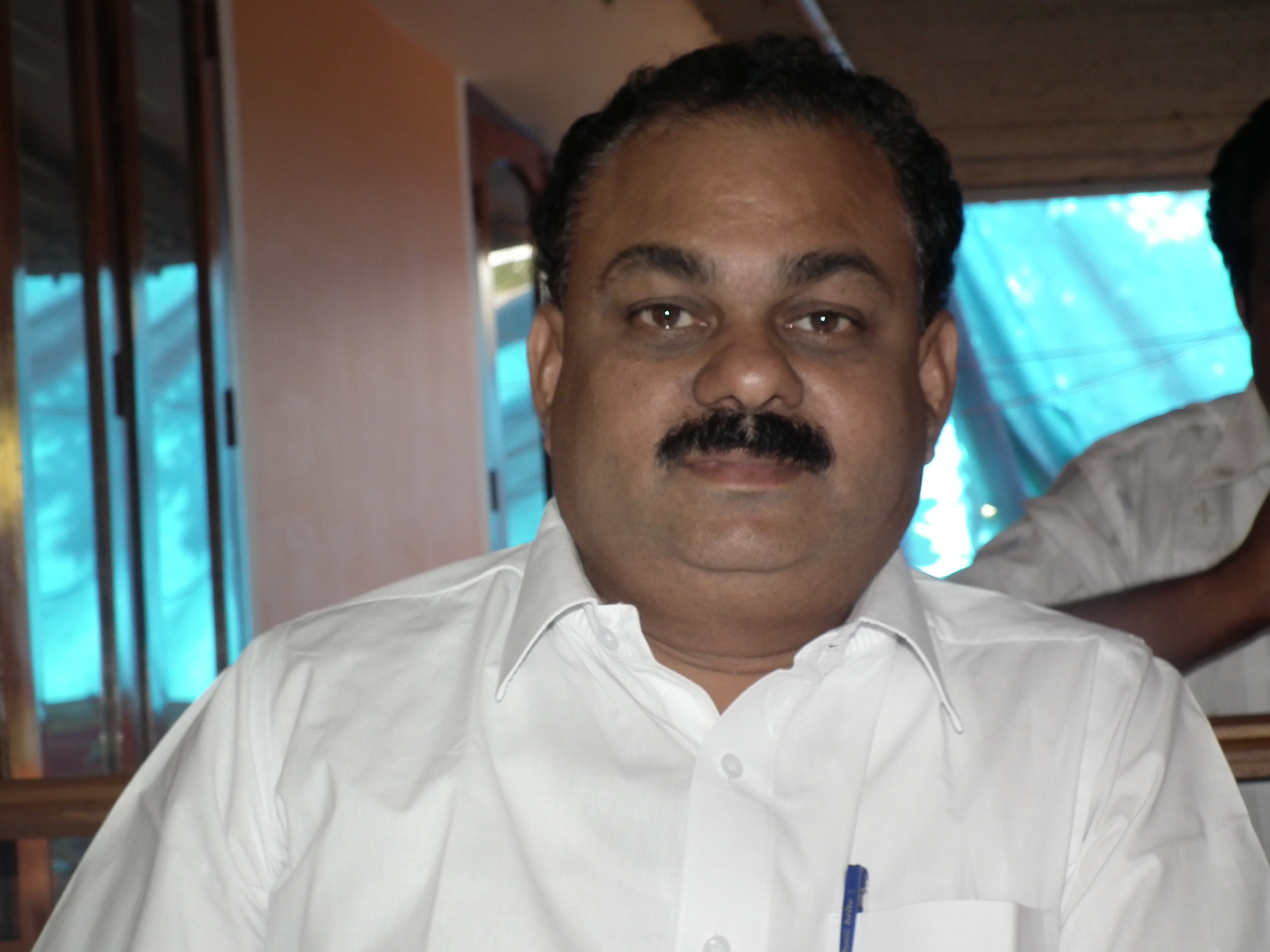

Member of legislative assembly
- In office 2011–2016
- Preceded by: Rajaji Mathew Thomas
- Succeeded by: Adv. K. Rajan
- Constituency: Ollur

Personal details
- Born: 19 January 1964 (age 62) Thrissur, Kerala
- Party: Indian National Congress
- Website: website

Maniyaku Poulose Vincent is an Indian National Congress politician from Thrissur and Member of the Legislative Assembly of Ollur Assembly Constituency to Kerala Legislative Assembly in 2011.

== Early life ==
Vincent was born to Poulose and Mary of the Maniyaku house, on 19 January 1964;in Pudukad, Thrissur District. He completed his schooling at St. Mary's High School, Chengalore in 1979 and later joined Christ College, Irinjalakuda in 1984.
