= All India Kisan Sabha =

Farmers' wing of Communist Pary of India

All India Kisan Sabha (AIKS)
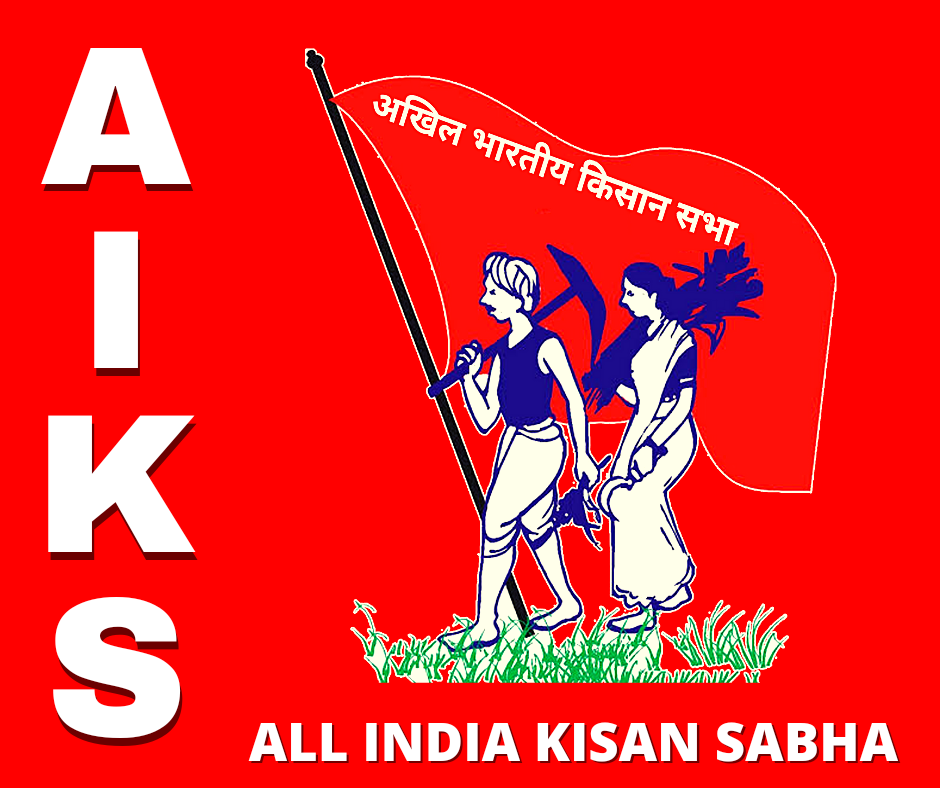
- Formation: 11 April 1936 (90 years ago), Lucknow, United Province, British Raj
- Type: Peasant Organisation
- Headquarters: Ajoy Bhavan, 15, Indrajit Gupta Marg, New Delhi, India-110002
- Location: India
- National President: Rajan Kshirsagar
- General Secretary: R. Venkaiah
- Affiliations: Communist Party of India

All India Kisan Sabha (abbr. AIKS; lit. All India Farmers Union, also known as the Akhil Bharatiya Kisan Sabha) is the peasant or farmers' wing of the Communist Party of India, an important peasant movement formed by Sahajanand Saraswati in 1936.

== History ==
The Kisan Sabha movement started in Bihar under the leadership of Sahajanand Saraswati who had formed in 1929 the Bihar Provincial Kisan Sabha (BPKS) to mobilise peasant grievances against the zamindari attacks on their occupancy rights and thus sparking the farmers' movements in India.

Gradually, the peasant movement intensified and spread across the rest of India. All of those radical developments on the peasant front culminated in the formation of the All India Kisan Sabha at the Lucknow session of the Indian National Congress in April 1936, with Sahajanand Saraswati elected as its first president. The other prominent members were N.G. Ranga, Ram Manohar Lohia, Jayaprakash Narayan, Acharya Narendra Dev and Bankim Mukerji. It involved prominent leaders like E.M.S. Namboodiripad, Indulal Yagnik, Sohan Singh Bhakna, Z. A. Ahmed, Karyanand Sharma, Yamuna Karjee, Yadunandan Sharma, Rahul Sankrityayan, P. Sundarayya, Yogendra Sharma and Bankim Mukherjee. The Kisan Manifesto, released in August 1936, demanded the abolition of the zamindari system and the cancellation of rural debts. In October 1937, it adopted the red flag as its banner. Soon, its leaders became increasingly distant with Congress and repeatedly came in confrontation with Congress governments in Bihar and in United Province.

In subsequent years, the movement was increasingly dominated by Socialists and Communists as it moved away from the Congress. By the 1938 Haripura session of the Congress, under the presidency of Netaji Subhas Chandra Bose, the rift became evident and by May 1942, the Communist Party of India, which was finally legalised by the government in July 1942, had taken over All India Kisan Sabha all across India, including Bengal where its membership grew considerably. It took on the Communist Party's line of people's war and stayed away from the Quit India Movement, which started in August 1942, and so lost its popular base. Many of its members defied party orders and joined the movement. Prominent members like N. G. Ranga, Indulal Yagnik and Swami Sahajananda soon left the organisation, which increasingly found it difficult to approach the peasants with its watered-down pro-British and pro-war approach. That made increase its nationalist agenda, much to the dismay of the British Raj.

== Conferences and office bearers ==
| National Conference | Year | Place | President | General Secretary |
|---|---|---|---|---|
| 1 (founder conference) | 11 April 1936 | Lucknow, Uttar Pradesh | Sahajanand Saraswati | N. G. Ranga |
| 2 | 25–26 December 1936 | Faijpur | N. G. Ranga | Sahajanand Saraswati |
| 3 | 11–14 May 1938 | Comilla (now in Bangladesh) | Sahajanand Saraswati | N. G. Ranga |
| 4 | 9–10 April 1939 | Gaya, Bihar | Narendra Dev | Sahajanand Saraswati |
| 5 | 26–27 March 1940 | Palasa, Andhra Pradesh | Rahul Sankrityayan | Indulal Yagnik |
| 6 | 29–31 May 1942 | Patna | Indulal Yagnik | Sahajanand Saraswati |
| 7 | 1–4 April 1943 | Bhakhna, Punjab | Bankim Mukherjee | Sahajanand Saraswati |
| 8 | 14–15 March 1944 | Vijayawada Andhra Pradesh | Sahajanand Saraswati | Bankim Mukherjee |
| 9 | 5–9 April 1945 | Netrakona (now in Bangladesh) | Muzaffar Ahmad | Bankim Mukherjee |
| 10 | 22–26 May 1947 | Secunderabad, Aligarh | Karyanand Sharma | M.A. Rasul |
| 11 | 22–23 April 1953 | Kannur, Kerala | Indulal Yagnik | N. Prasad Rao |
| 12 | 13–19 September 1954 | Moga, Punjab | Indulal Yagnik | N. Prasad Rao |
| 13 | 17–22 May 1955 | Talasari, Dahanu, Maharashtra | Nana Patil | N. Prasad Rao |
| 14 | 28–30 September 1956 | Amritsar | A. K. Gopalan | N. Prasad Rao |
| 15 | 28 October – 3 November 1957 | Bangaon, West Bengal | A. K. Gopalan | N. Prasad Rao |
| 16 | 29 April – 3 May 1959 | Mayuram, Tanjaur, Tamil Nadu | A. K. Gopalan | Bhabani Sen |
| 17 | 17–19 May 1960 | Gazipur, Uttar Pradesh | A. K. Gopalan | Bhabani Sen |
| 18 | 30 March – 2 April 1961 | Thrissur, Kerala | A. K. Gopalan | Jagjit Singh Lyallpuri |
| 19 | 10–12 January 1968 | Amravati | Teja Singh Sutantar | Z.A. Ahmed |
| 20 | 1–5 April 1970 | Barasat, West Bengal | Teja Singh Sutantar | Z.A. Ahmed |
| 21 | 19–23 September 1973 | Bhatinda | Z.A. Ahmed | Indradeep Sinha |
| 22 | 7–10 June 1979 | Vijayawada Andhra Pradesh | Z.A. Ahmed | Indradeep Sinha |
| 23 | 28–31 December 1986 | Barabanki Uttar Pradesh | Indradeep Sinha | Y. V. Krishna Rao |
| 24 | 16–19 June 1993 | Madhubani, Bihar | Y. V. Krishna Rao | Bhogendra Jha |
| 25 | | Bihar | Bhogendra Jha | Y. V. Krishna Rao |
| 26 | 1997 | Thrissur | Bhogendra Jha | Atul Kumar Anjan |
| 27 | 2001 | Kauntai, West Bengal | C. K. Chandrappan | Atul Kumar Anjan |
| 28 | 9–12 December 2010 | Aurangabad, Maharashtra | Prabodh Panda | Atul Kumar Anjan |
| 29 | 27–29 March 2015 | Hyderabad, Telangana | Prabodh Panda | Atul Kumar Anjan |
| | 16 November 2021 | In CC meeting | R. Venkaiah | Atul Kumar Anjan |

== Activities ==
=== Protest against three Agri-bills ===
AIKS led nationwide protests against the Farmers' Produce Trade and Commerce (Promotion and Facilitation) Act, 2020; the Farmers (Empowerment and Protection) Agreement on Price Assurance and Farm Services Act, 2020; and the Essential Commodities (Amendment) Act, 2020.

- 2 October 2018: The AIKS organized a march of farmers at the boundary of Delhi and Uttar Pradesh.
- 26 January 2021: The AIKS organised a tractor rally in the national capital.
- 26 February 2022: The AIKS led thousands of farmers started marching to the Collector's Office in Dhule district, Maharashtra, to demand forest land certificates.
