= M. K. Ramachandran =

Indian writer

M. K. Ramachandran is a writer from Kechery, Thrissur, Kerala. In 2005 he won the Kerala Sahithya Academy award for his first book, Uttarakhandiloode - Kailas Mansarovar Yatra. His other books are Thapobhoomi Uttarakhand, Adi Kailasa Yathra and Devabhoomiyiloode.

== Early life and education ==
Ramachandran was born in 1953 at Kechery in Thrissur district. His parents were Machingal Krishnan Ezhuthachan and Narangalil Vadakkevalappil Devaki Amma. He completed his studies at Puttekkara St. Sebastians' School, Thrissur Sree Keralavarma College and Thrissur St. Thomas College. He is a disciple of the veteran Sanskrit scholar K. P. Narayana Pisharody. He was one of the first persons from Kerala who conducted Kailas Mansarovar Yatra, which he conducted in 2001.

== Writing career ==
His first book, 'Uttarkhandiloode - Kailas Mansarovar Yatra' was published in 2003 and narrates this experience. His second book, 'Thapoobhoomi Uttarkhand', was published in 2005, and that book was written on his Char Dham tour and also other pilgrim spots in the northern state Uttarakhand. His third book, 'Adi Kailasa Yathra', was published in 2008, and it narrates his experience with the peaks Om Parvat and Kailash located in Uttarakhand. His fourth book, 'Devabhoomiyiloode', was published in 2012, and it narrates his experiences with Kinnaur, Shrikant Mahadev and Manimahesh Kailash & also his Sikkim tour. He is perhaps the only person who visited all five Kailash. In 2014, he also published a collection of short stories called 'Nilavum Nizhalukalum'.

== Awards ==
- Kerala Sahithya Academy Award 2005 for Uttarakhandiloode - Kailas Mansarovar Yatra
