= Edappalam =

Coordinates: 11°09′N 76°13′E

- village
- Interactive map of Edappalam
- Country: India
- State: Kerala
- District: Palakkad
- Elevation: 63 m (207 ft)

Population (2005)
  - Total: 1,536

Languages
  - Official: Malayalam, English
- Time zone: UTC+5:30 (IST)
- Postal code: 679308
- Website: www.edappalam.info

Edappalam is a small village located in the western part of Palakkad district, Kerala, India (Palakkad - Malappuram border) situated along the banks of famous river Kunthippuzha. A feature of Edappalam is the traditional festivals like 'Kalarikkal Aaratu' and the annual 'Rayiranallur Malakayattam' which has long historical beliefs. Several ancient and historical temples and mosques are located here. For more details visit www.edappalam.info
