= Indradeep Sinha =

Indian freedom fighter and veteran communist leader

Ministry of Revenue, Government of Bihar
- In office 1967–1968

Member of Parliament, Rajya Sabha
- In office 1974–1986

Personal details
- Died: 9 June 2003
- Party: Communist Party of India
- Education: Patna University

Indradeep Sinha (July 1914 – 9 June 2003) was an Indian freedom fighter and veteran communist leader.

== Biography ==
He was born in Shakara village in present-day Siwan District of Bihar, India, in July 1914. He had an academic career and secured a gold medal in post-graduation in Economics from Patna University in 1938. He wrote about 25 books. He chose to serve the people by fighting for political freedom of the nation and social and economic justice to its people. With a master's degree in economics from Patna University and a gold medal, Sinha joined the Communist Party of India in 1940 and served the party as state secretary. A lecturer and journalist, Sinha was Secretary of the Bihar State Council of the Communist Party of India from 1962 to 1967 and had served as the General Secretary of the All India Kisan Sabha from 1973 until the late 1990s. Sinha was also editor of the Hunkar, Janashakti and New Age weeklies. Indradeep Sinha started his legislative career with the membership of the Bihar Legislative Council, where he was a member from 1964 to 1974. He also served as the Minister of Revenues in the United Front Government of Bihar from 1967 to 1968. As Revenues Minister, he took several initiatives to ameliorate the condition of the poor and took steps for distribution of land to the landless in the State. Sinha represented the State of Bihar in the Rajya Sabha for two terms from April 1974 to April 1980 and again from July 1980 to July 1986.

== Partial bibliography of books authored ==
- Crisis of capitalist path in India: The policy alternatives, Communist Party of India (1982).
- On certain ideological positions of Communist Party of India (Marxist) and Communist Party of India (1983).
- Real face of JP's total revolution, Communist Party of India (1974).
- Some features of current agrarian situation in India, All India Kisan Sabha, (1987).
- The changing agrarian scene: Problems and tasks, Peoples Publishing House (1980).
- Some questions concerning Marxism and the peasantry, Communist Party of India (1982).
- Sathi ke Kisanon ka Aitihasic Sangharsha (Historic Struggle of Sathi Peasants), in Hindi, Patna (1969).
