= Workers Revolutionary Party (India) =

Workers Revolutionary Party was a communist group in Kerala, India. It existed sometime around 1970, and had branches in Trivandrum, Ernakulam and Alappuzha. It was led by A. Achuthan.
