= Thrissur R. Vaidyanatha Bhagavathar =

Indian Carnatic vocalist

- Born: R. Vaidyanatha Bhagavathar; Irinjalakuda, India
- Genre: Carnatic
- Occupation: Singer

Thrissur R. Vaidyanatha Bhagavathar is a Carnatic vocalist from Thrissur city, Kerala. He studied music from Thanjavur. His guru was Swamimalai Janakiraman and Umayalpuram Venkatraman.
