= Chiranellur =

- village
- Location in Kerala, India Chiranellur (India)
- Coordinates: 10.6344100°N 76.1378000°E
- Country: India
- State: Kerala
- District: Thrissur

Population (2011)
  - Total: 9,789

Languages
  - Official: Malayalam, English
- Time zone: UTC+5:30 (IST)
- PIN: 6XXXXX
- Vehicle registration: KL-

Chiranellur is a village in Thrissur district in the state of Kerala, India.

== Demographics ==
As of 2011 India census, Chiranellur had a population of 9789 with 4608 males and 5181 females.
