= P. R. Francis =

Indian politician (1924–2002)

1957, 1960, 1970 and 1977
- In office 19 years
- Preceded by: M V Aryan
- Succeeded by: A.M. Paraman, Raghavan Pozhakadavil
- Constituency: Ollur Assembly Constituency

Personal details
- Born: 3 December 1924 Ollur, Thrissur, Kerala
- Died: 10 May 2002 (aged 77) Kochi
- Party: Indian National Congress
- Spouse: Achayi Francis
- Children: 2

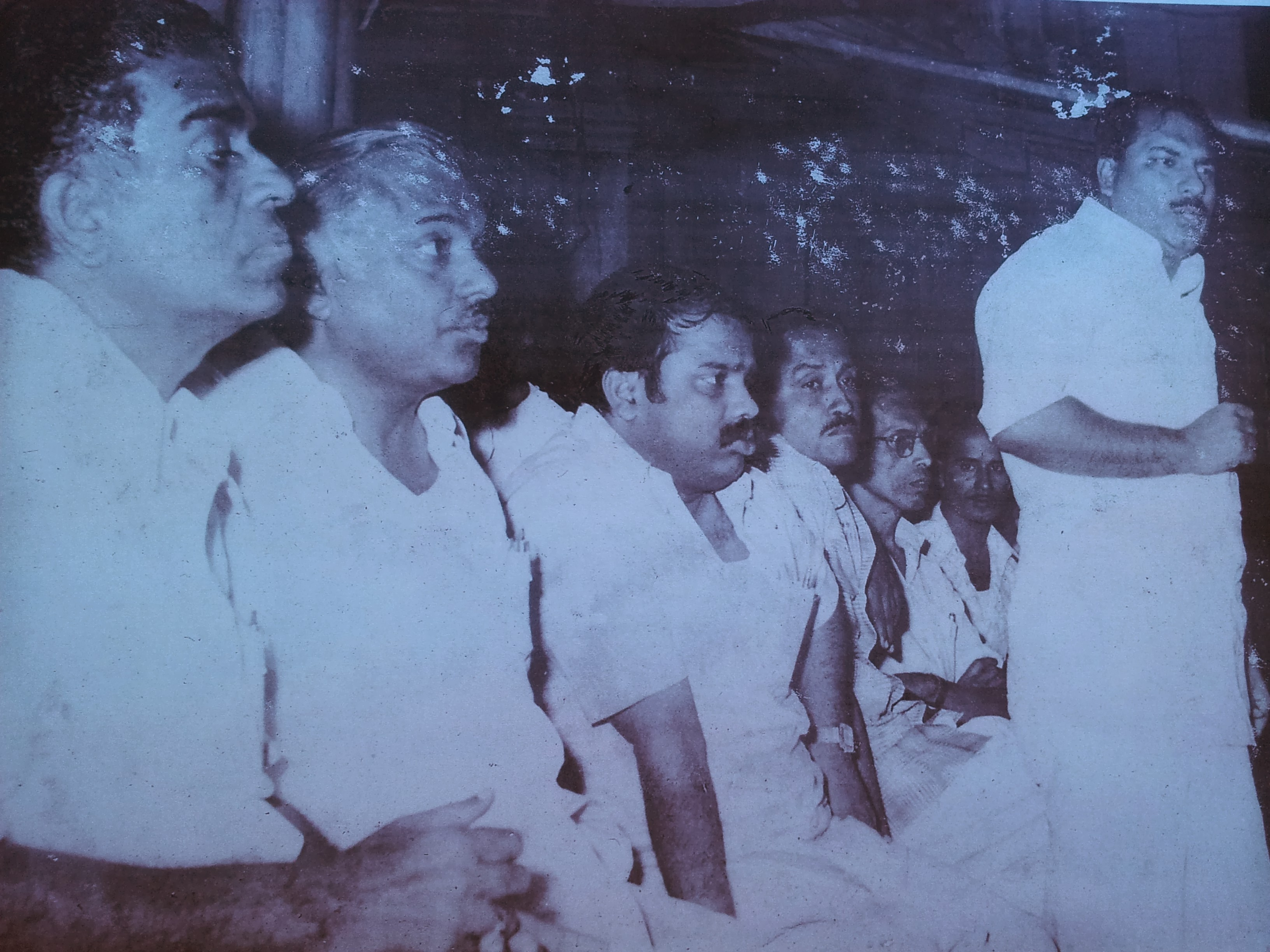
With AK Antony, Sidharthan Kattungal and Jos Thanikkal

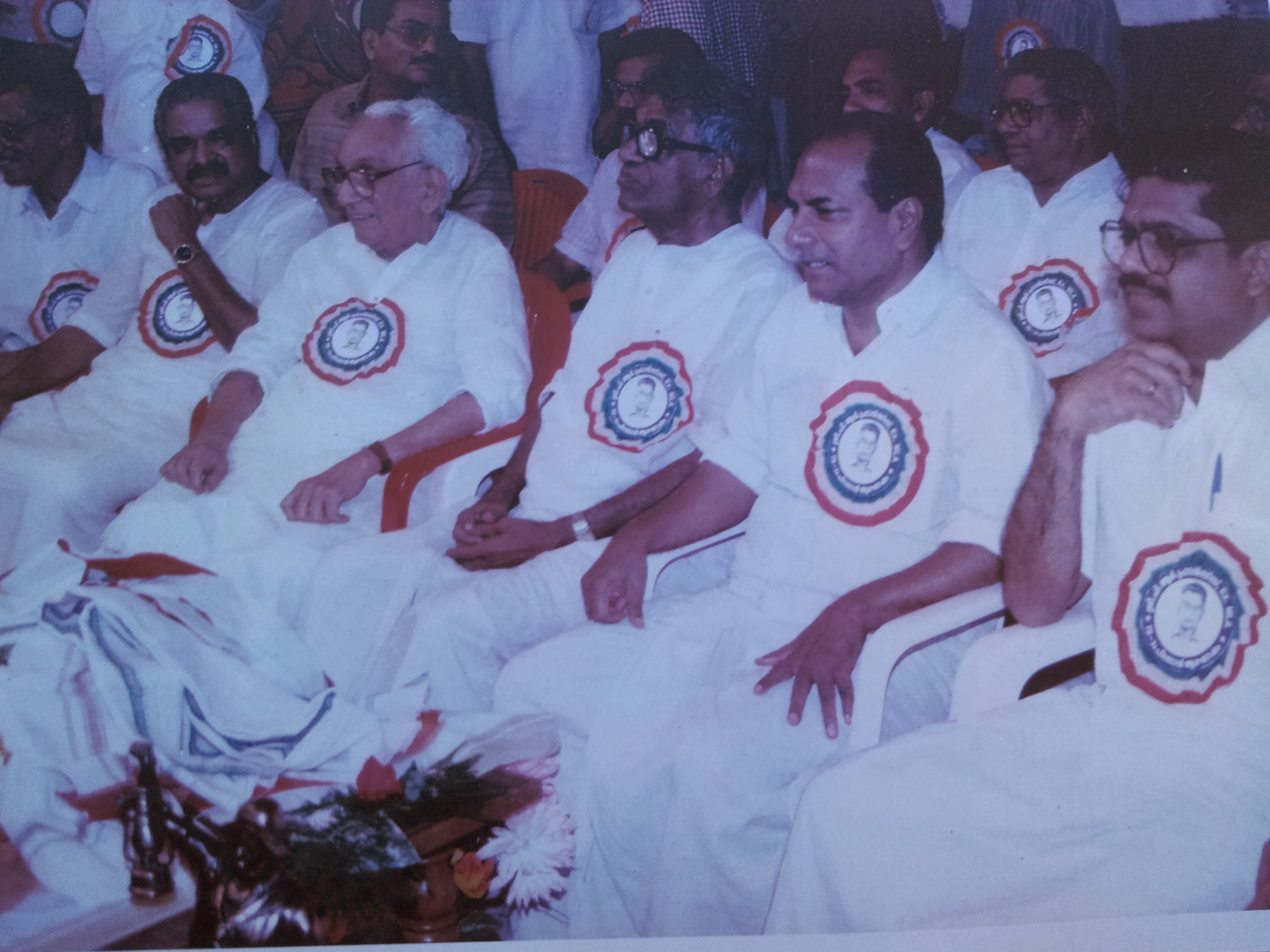
With K Karunakaran and AK Antony

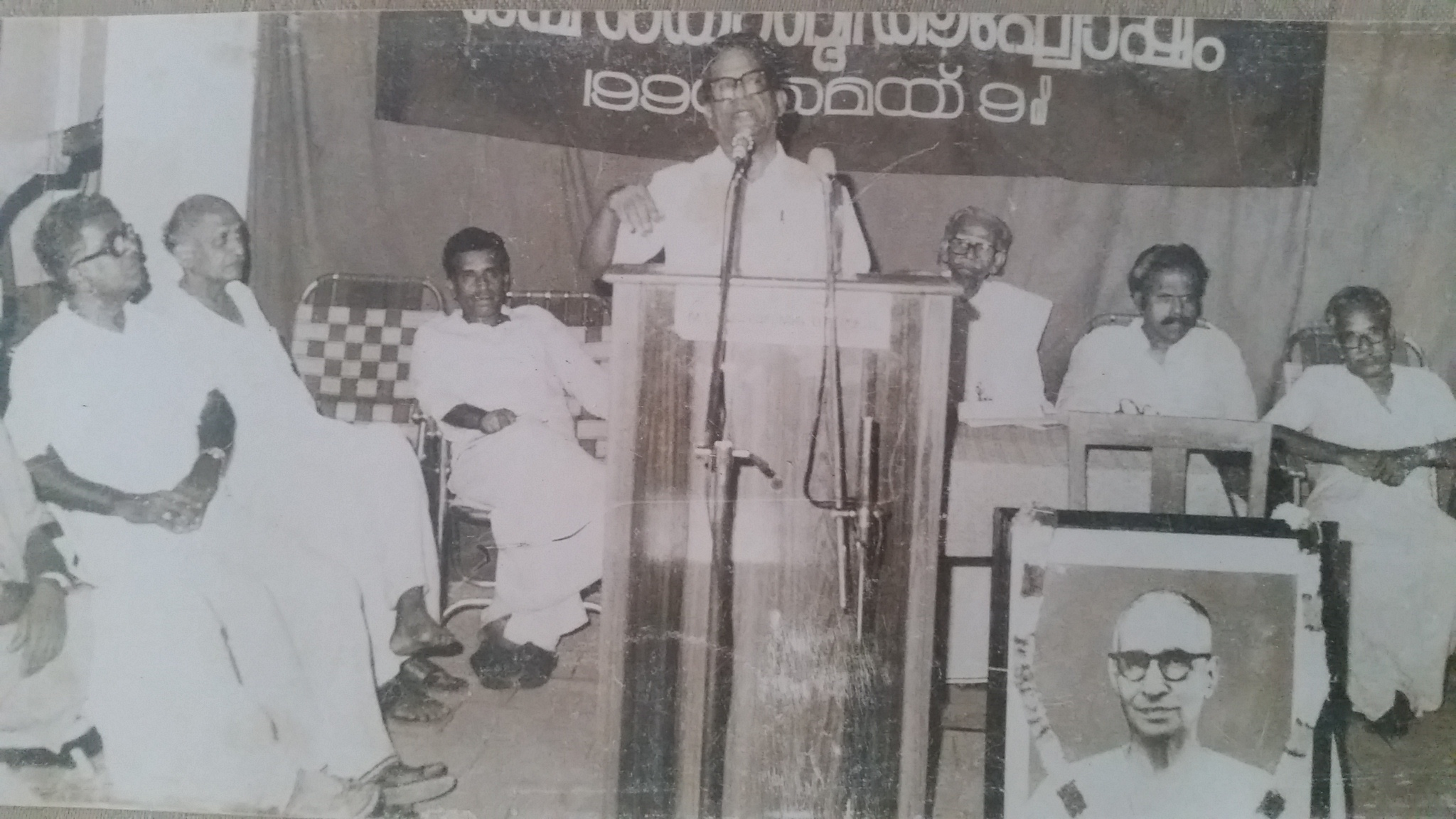
With freedom fighter VR Krishnan Ezhuthachan

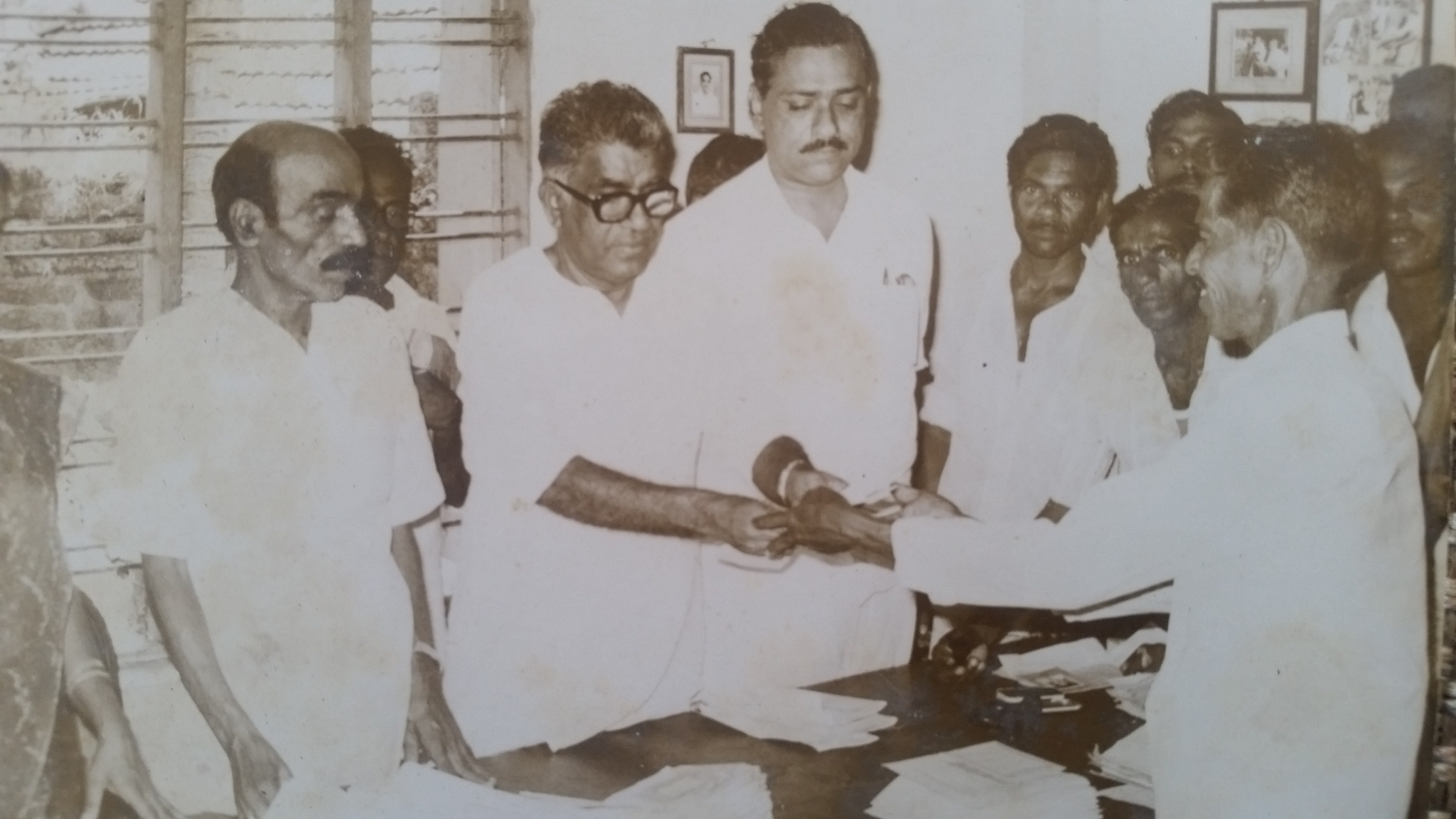
With M Madhavan, INTUC District President

P. R. Francis (3 December 1924 – 10 May 2002) was an Indian National Congress politician and an Indian National Trade Union Congress (INTUC) leader from Thrissur and Member of the Legislative Assembly of Ollur to Kerala Legislative Assembly in 1957, 1960, 1970 and 1977. He was the President of the District Congress Committee of Trichur and served INTUC in the capacity of State Secretary and Vice President. He has organized workers of tile factories, plantation units, headload workers etc. in Thrissur and Ollur through Indian National Trade Union Congress. He has also participated in Quit India Movement.

P R Francis Memorial Award, an award instituted in memory of P.R. Francis for the best social worker by P.R. Francis Smaraka Samithi. The award is presented at Ollur Town Hall and includes a cash prize of Rs 11,111 and memento.
