= Mudikkode (Thrissur) =

Mudikkode is a small village located in the Thrissur district of Kerala, India. It is situated approximately 10 kilometers from Thrissur city. One of the notable landmarks in Mudikkode is the Pananchery Mudikkode Siva Temple. According to local belief, it is one of the 108 Shiva Temples in Kerala consecrated by the sage Parashurama.
