= P. P. George =

Indian politician (1935–2008)

Kerala Legislative Assembly
- In office 1965, 1967, 1970, 1987, 1991 and 2001
- Preceded by: A.M. Paraman
- Succeeded by: C.N. Jayadevan
- Constituency: Chalakudy, Thiruvambady, Ollur

Personal details
- Born: 25 July 1935 Pudukkad, Thrissur, Kerala
- Died: 5 January 2008 (aged 72) Pudukkad, Thrissur
- Party: Indian National Congress
- Spouse: C.L. Reetha
- Children: One son and one daughter

Pulikkal Poulose George (25 July 1935 – 5 January 2008) was an Indian National Congress politician from Thrissur and Member of the Legislative Assembly from Chalakudy in 1965, 1967 and 1970, from Thiruvambady in 1987 and from Ollur in 1991 and 2001. He was the Agriculture Minister in 1991 Ministry.

== Early life ==
George was a senior Congress leader born on 25 July 1935, son of Mary and Poulose of the Pulikkal house at Pudukkadu Thrissur district Kerala. A teacher by profession he entered politics through Congress. The veteran Congress leader died on 5 January 2008, aged 72.

== Political career ==
He had also been actively engaged in trade union activities since the 1950s. In 1959–1960 he was the General convenor of Kerala liberation struggle moment in Thrissur district.

Political positions

- 1962–2008 KPCC member
- 1965–2001 KPCC executive member
- 1969–1972 AICC member
- 1971–1977 Secretary of Congress parliamentary party
- 1976–1977 Estimate committee chairman Kerala legislative assembly
- 1978–1998 KPCC General Secretary
- 1982–1986 Director, K.T.D.C.
- 1986–1987 Vice Chairman, Kerala Khadi & village industries board
- 1981–1982 D.C.C. President, Thrissur
- 1965, 1967, 1970, 1987, 1991, 2001 Member Kerala Legislative Assembly
- 1991–1995 Agriculture Minister, government of Kerala
- 2001–2006 whip of Congress parliamentary party

A staunch supporter and close aide of leader K. Karunakaran, in 2005 he parted the ways with him, when Karunakaran quit Congress to form a new party D.I.C. (K).
