= The Internationale =

International left-wing anthem

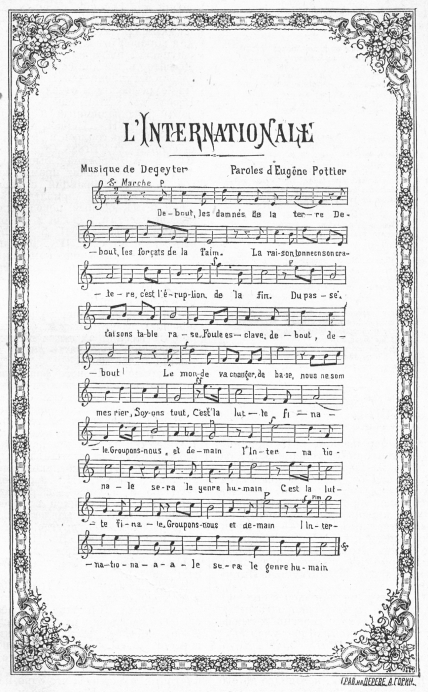
- "L'Internationale", original French version
- International anthem of anarchists, communists, socialists and social democrats
- Also known as: « L'Internationale »
- Lyrics: Eugène Pottier, 1871
- Music: Pierre De Geyter, 1888

Audio sample
- Instrumental rendition in A major: file; help

"The Internationale" (Note: English: /ˌɪn.tər.næʃ.ə.ˈnɑːl, -.ˈnæl/, IN-tər-nash-ə-NA(H)L; French: L'Internationale [lɛ̃tɛʁnɑsjɔnal].) is an international anthem that has been adopted as the anthem of various anarchist, communist, socialist, and social democratic movements. It has been a standard of the socialist movement since the late nineteenth century, when the Second International adopted it as its official anthem. The title arises from the "First International", an alliance of workers, which held a congress in 1864. The author of the anthem's lyrics, Eugène Pottier, a member of the French branch of the organisation, attended this congress. Pottier's text was later set to an original melody composed by Pierre De Geyter, a member of the Parti ouvrier français (French Workers Party) in Lille in industrial northern France.

== Lyrics ==
The song in its original French version was written in June 1871 by Eugène Pottier, a member of the First International and Paris Commune, after the Commune had been crushed by the French army on 28 May but before Pottier fled first to Britain and then later (1873–1881) to the United States. Pottier intended it to be sung to the tune of "La Marseillaise". The song was reputedly sung to the Marseillaise at Pottier's burial in November 1887. Only the following year, the melody to which The Internationale is usually sung was composed by Pierre De Geyter for the choir "La Lyre des Travailleurs" of the French Workers' Party in his hometown of Lille, and first performed there in July 1888. De Geyter had been commissioned by Gustave Delory the future mayor of Lille, who had received the text from a young socialist teacher, Charles Gros.

Pottier wrote an earlier version of the song in September 1870, to celebrate the Third Republic declared after the defeat of the Second French Empire by Prussia and the abdication of Napoleon III, and to honour the First International; this version was reprinted in 1988, the centennial of Degeyter's musical setting, by the historian of Commune song, Robert Brécy. Contemporary editions published by Boldoduc (Lille) in 1888, by Delory in 1894, and by Lagrange in 1898 are no longer locatable, but the text that endures is the one authorised by Pottier for his Chants Révolutionnaires, published by his Communard colleague Jean Allemane in April 1887, before Pottier's death in November, and reprinted in Pottier's Collected Works. This version, along with a facsimile reprint of De Geyter's score and translations into English and other languages, also appears in the only English-language selection of Pottier's works, edited by Loren Kruger.

Pottier's lyrics contain one-liners that became very popular and found widespread use as slogans; other lines such as "Ni Dieu, ni César, ni tribun" ("Neither God, nor Caesar, nor tribune") were already well known in the workers' movement. The success of the song is connected to the stability and widespread popularity of the Second International. Like the lyrics, the music by De Geyter was relatively simple and down to earth, suitable for a workers' audience.

=== French original ===
1887 version

Debout, les damnés de la terre
Debout, les forçats de la faim
La raison tonne en son cratère
C'est l'éruption de la fin
Du passé faisons table rase
Foule esclave, debout, debout
Le monde va changer de base
Nous ne sommes rien, soyons tout

Refrain :
𝄆 C'est la lutte finale
Groupons-nous, et demain
L'Internationale
Sera le genre humain 𝄇

Il n'est pas de sauveurs suprêmes
Ni Dieu, ni César, ni tribun
Producteurs, sauvons-nous nous-mêmes
Décrétons le salut commun
Pour que le voleur rende gorge
Pour tirer l'esprit du cachot
Soufflons nous-mêmes notre forge
Battons le fer quand il est chaud

Refrain

L'État comprime et la loi triche
L'impôt saigne le malheureux
Nul devoir ne s'impose au riche
Le droit du pauvre est un mot creux
C'est assez, languir en tutelle
L'égalité veut d'autres lois
Pas de droits sans devoirs dit-elle
Égaux, pas de devoirs sans droits

Refrain

Hideux dans leur apothéose
Les rois de la mine et du rail
Ont-ils jamais fait autre chose
Que dévaliser le travail ?
Dans les coffres-forts de la bande
Ce qu'il a créé s'est fondu
En décrétant qu'on le lui rende
Le peuple ne veut que son dû

Refrain

Les rois nous saoulaient de fumées
Paix entre nous, guerre aux tyrans
Appliquons la grève aux armées
Crosse en l'air, et rompons les rangs
S'ils s'obstinent, ces cannibales
À faire de nous des héros
Ils sauront bientôt que nos balles
Sont pour nos propres généraux

Refrain

Ouvriers, paysans, nous sommes
Le grand parti des travailleurs
La terre n'appartient qu'aux hommes
L'oisif ira loger ailleurs
Combien de nos chairs se repaissent
Mais si les corbeaux, les vautours
Un de ces matins disparaissent
Le soleil brillera toujours

Refrain

Literal translation

Arise, damned of the earth
Arise, convicts of hunger
Reason thunders in its crater
This is the eruption of the end
Of the past let us wipe the slate clean
Slave masses, arise, arise
The world will change its base
We are nothing, let us be everything

Chorus:
𝄆 This is the final struggle
Let us gather together, and tomorrow
The Internationale
Will be the human race 𝄇

There are no supreme saviors
Neither God, nor Caesar, nor tribune.
Producers, let us save ourselves
Let us decree on the common welfare
For the thief vomit
For the spirit be pulled from its confines
Let us fan the forge ourselves
Let us strike the iron while it is hot

Chorus

The state Compresses and the law cheats
The tax bleeds the unfortunate
No duty is imposed on the rich
"The rights of the poor" is a hollow phrase
It's enough, languishing in custody
Equality wants other laws
No rights without obligations, she says
Equals, no obligations without rights

Chorus

Hideous in their apotheosis
The kings of the mine and rail
Have they ever done anything other
Than steal work?
Into the coffers of that lot
What work creates has melted
In demanding that they give it back
The people wants only its due

Chorus

The kings intoxicate us with gunsmoke
Peace among ourselves, war to the tyrants!
Let the armies go on strike
Gun butts in the air, and break ranks
If these cannibals insist
In making heroes of us
Soon they will know our bullets
Are for our own generals

Chorus

Laborers, peasants, we are
The great party of workers
The earth belongs only to men
The idle will reside elsewhere
How much of our flesh they feed on
But if the ravens, the vultures
Disappear one of these days
The sun will shine always

Chorus

=== Authorship and copyright ===
In a successful attempt to save Pierre De Geyter's job as a woodcarver, the 6,000 leaflets printed by Lille printer Boldoduc only mentioned the French version of his family name (Degeyter). The second edition published by Delory named Pierre's brother Adolphe as the composer. With neither money nor representation, Pierre De Geyter lost his first lawsuit over this in 1914 and did not gain legal recognition of authorship until 1922 when he was 74. His brother had in the meantime died by suicide in 1916, leaving a note to Pierre explaining the fraud and stating that Delory had manipulated him into claiming authorship; and Delory had inscribed on Adolphe's tombstone "Ici repose Adolphe Degeyter, l'auteur de L'Internationale" ("Here lies Adolphe De Geyter, the authour of The Internationale". Despite this dying declaration, historians in the 1960s such as Daniel Ligou were still contending that Adolphe was the author.

In 1972 "Montana Edition", owned by Hans R. Beierlein, bought the rights to the song for 5,000 Deutschmark, first for the territory of West Germany, then in East Germany, then worldwide. According to Beierlein, East Germany paid Montana Edition 20,000 DM every year for its rights to play the music. Pierre De Geyter died in 1932, causing the copyrights to expire in 2002. Luckhardt's German text is the public domain since 1984.

As the music of "The Internationale" was published before 1 July 1909 outside the United States, it is in the public domain in the United States. As of 2013, Pierre De Geyter's music is also in the public domain in countries and areas whose copyright durations are authors' lifetime plus 80 years or less. Due to France's wartime copyright extensions (prorogations de Guerre), SACEM claimed that the music was still copyrighted in France until October 2014. The "Internationale" is now also in the public domain within France.

As Eugène Pottier died in 1887, his original French lyrics are in the public domain. Gustave Delory once acquired the copyright of his lyrics through the songwriter Jean-Baptiste Clement, having bought it from Pottier's widow.

== Translations ==
There have been a very wide variety of translations of the anthem. In 2002, Kuznar noted that the nature of these translations has varied widely. Many have been closely literal translations with variations solely to account for rhyme and meter but others have been done to encode different ideology perspectives and or to update contents to adapt the lyrics to relevant more contemporary issues.

The first English version has been attributed to the author Eugène Pottier himself, produced apparently after he fled the fall of the Paris Commune in June 1871 for temporary exile in Britain (until 1873, when he went on to the United States). The first US translation was by Charles Hope Kerr who heard it in De Geyter's setting in Lille in 1894 and published it as a pamphlet that year. It was later reproduced in Songs of the IWW, first published in 1909 and has been reprinted by Kerr's publishing house into the 21st century.

The first of many Italian versions signed by E. Bergeret, identified as Ettore Marroni, in 1901. The Dutch communist poet Henriette Roland Holst translated it into Dutch, with "Ontwaakt, verworpenen der aarde" ('Wake up, all who are cast away') at about the same time. By the time of the 1910 International Socialist Congress in Copenhagen, versions had appeared in 18 different languages, including a Danish one by A. C. Meyer, which was sung at the end of a cantata by 500 singers.

=== Russian version used in the Soviet Union ===
The Russian version was initially translated by Arkady Kots in 1902 and printed in London in Zhizn, a Russian émigré magazine. The first Russian version had only three stanzas, based on stanzas 1, 2, and 6 of the original, and the refrain. After the Bolshevik Revolution in Russia, the text was slightly re-worded to get rid of "now useless" future tenses – particularly the refrain was reworded (the future tense was replaced by the present, and the first person plural possessive pronoun was introduced). In 1918 the chief editor of Izvestia, Yuri Steklov, appealed to Russian writers to translate the other three stanzas, which did eventually happen.

The Russian Internationale has been translated into many indigenous languages of Russia, including Tatar, Bashkir, Chuvash, Chukchi, Udmurt and Yakut.

Internatsional
English: The Internationale
- Интернационал
- Former national anthem of the Russian SFSR Former national anthem of the Soviet Union
- Lyrics: Arkady Kotz, 1902
- Music: Pierre De Geyter, 1888
- Published: 1902
- Adopted: 1918 (Russian SFSR); 1922 (Soviet Union)
- Relinquished: 1922 (Russian SFSR); 1944 (Soviet Union)
- Preceded by: Worker's Marseillaise
- Succeeded by: State Anthem of the Soviet Union

Audio sample
- The Internationale (Vocal): file; help

Russian original

Russian Cyrillic alphabet

Вставай, проклятьем заклеймённый,
Весь мир голодных и рабов!
Кипит наш разум возмущённый
И в смертный бой вести готов.
Весь мир насилья мы разрушим
До основанья, а затем
Мы наш, мы новый мир построим, –
Кто был ничем, тот станет всем.

Припев:
𝄆 Это есть наш последний
И решительный бой;
С Интернационалом
Воспрянет род людской! 𝄇

Никто не даст нам избавленья:
Ни бог, ни царь и не герой!
Добьёмся мы освобожденья
Своею собственной рукой.
Чтоб свергнуть гнёт рукой умелой,
Отвоевать своё добро, –
Вздувайте горн и куйте смело,
Пока железо горячо!

Припев

Довольно кровь сосать, вампиры,
Тюрьмой, налогом, нищетой!
У вас – вся власть, все блага мира,
А наше право – звук пустой !
Мы жизнь построим по-иному –
И вот наш лозунг боевой:
Вся власть народу трудовому!
А дармоедов всех долой!

Припев

Презренны вы в своём богатстве,
Угля и стали короли!
Вы ваши троны, тунеядцы,
На наших спинах возвели.
Заводы, фабрики, палаты –
Всё нашим создано трудом.
Пора! Мы требуем возврата
Того, что взято грабежом.

Припев

Довольно королям в угоду
Дурманить нас в чаду войны!
Война тиранам! Мир Народу!
Бастуйте, армии сыны!
Когда ж тираны нас заставят
В бою геройски пасть за них –
Убийцы, в вас тогда направим
Мы жерла пушек боевых!

Припев

Лишь мы, работники всемирной
Великой армии труда,
Владеть землёй имеем право,
Но паразиты – никогда!
И если гром великий грянет
Над сворой псов и палачей, –
Для нас всё так же солнце станет
Сиять огнём своих лучей.

Припев

Pre-Revolution Russian Cyrillic

Вставай, проклятьемъ заклеймённый,
Весь миръ голодныхъ и рабовъ!
Кипитъ нашъ разумъ возмущённый
И въ смертный бой вести готовъ.
Весь миръ насилья мы разрушимъ
До основанья, а затѣмъ
Мы нашъ, мы новый миръ построимъ, –
Кто былъ ничѣмъ, тотъ станетъ всемъ.

Припѣвъ:
𝄆 Это есть нашъ послѣдній
И рѣшительный бой;
Съ Интернаціоналомъ
Воспрянетъ родъ людской! 𝄇

Никто не дастъ намъ избавленья:
Ни богъ, ни царь и не герой!
Добьёмся мы освобожденья
Своею собственной рукой.
Чтобъ свергнуть гнётъ рукой умѣлой,
Отвоевать своё добро, –
Вздувайте горнъ и куйте смело,
Пока желѣзо горячо!

Припѣвъ

Довольно кровь сосать, вампиры,
Тюрьмой, налогомъ, нищетой!
У васъ – вся власть, все блага мира,
А наше право – звукъ пустой !
Мы жизнь построимъ по-иному –
И вотъ нашъ лозунгъ боевой:
Вся власть народу трудовому!
А дармоѣдовъ всѣхъ долой!

Припѣвъ

Презрѣнны вы въ своёмъ богатствѣ,
Угля и стали короли!
Вы ваши троны, тунеядцы,
На нашихъ спинахъ возвели.
Заводы, фабрики, палаты –
Всё нашимъ создано трудомъ.
Пора! Мы требуемъ возврата
Того, что взято грабежомъ.

Припѣвъ

Довольно королямъ въ угоду
Дурманить насъ въ чаду войны!
Война тиранамъ! Миръ Народу!
Бастуйте, арміи сыны!
Когда жъ тираны насъ заставятъ
Въ бою геройски пасть за нихъ –
Убійцы, въ васъ тогда направимъ
Мы жерла пушекъ боевыхъ!

Припѣвъ

Лишь мы, работники всемірной
Великой арміи труда,
Владѣть землёй имѣемъ право,
Но паразиты – никогда!
И если громъ великій грянетъ
Надъ сворой псовъ и палачей, –
Для насъ всё такъ же солнце станетъ
Сіять огнёмъ своихъ лучей.

Припѣвъ

Russian Latin alphabet

Vstavay proklyatyem zakleymyonnyy,
Ves' mir golodnykh i rabov!
Kipit nash razum vozmushchyonnyy
I v smertnyy boy vesti gotov.
Ves' mir nasilia my razrushim
Do osnovania, a zatem
My nash my novyy mir postroim,
Kto byl nichem tot stanet vsem!

Pripev:
𝄆 Eto yest' nash posledniy
I reshitel'nyy boy;
S Internatsionalom
Vospryanet rod lyudskoy! 𝄇

Nikto ne dast nam izbavlenia:
Ni bog, ni tsar' i ne geroy
Dobiomsya my osvobozhdenia
Svoyeyu sobstvennoy rukoy.
chtob svergnut' gnyot rukoy umeloy,
Otvoyevat' svoyo dobro, –
Vzduvayte gorn i kuyte smelo,
Poka zhelezo goryacho!

Pripev

Dovol'no krov' sosat', vampiry,
Tyur'moy, nalogom nishchetoy!
U vas — vsya vlasty, vse blaga mira,
A nashe pravo — zvuk pustoy!
My zhizn' postroim po inomu-
I vot nash lozung boyevoy:
Vsya vlast' narodu trudovomu!
A darmoyedov vsekh doloy!

Pripev

Prezrenny vy v svoyom bogatstve,
Uglya i stali koroli!
Vy vashi trony tuneyadtsy,
Na nashikh spinakh vozveli.
Zavody, fabriki, palaty –
Vsyo nashim sozdano trudom.
Pora! My trebuyem vozvrata
Togo chto vzyato grabezhom.

Pripev

Dovol'no, korolyam v ugodu,
Durmanit' nas v chadu voyny!
Voyna tiranam! Mir Narodu!
Bastuyte armii syny!
Kogda zh tirany nas zastavyat
V boyu geroyski past' za nikh –
Ubiytsy v vas togda napravim
My zherla pushek boyevykh!

Pripev

Lish' my, rabotniki vsemirnoy
Velikoy armii truda!
Vladet' zemlyot imeyem pravo,
No parazity — nikogda!
I yesli grom velikiy gryanet
Nad svoroy psov i palachey,
Dlya nas vsyo takzhe solntse stanet
Siyat' ognyom svoikh luchey.

Pripev

English Translation

Arise, ones who are branded by the curse,
All the world's starving and enslaved!
Our outraged minds are boiling,
Ready to lead us into a deadly fight.
We will destroy this world of violence
Down to the foundations, and then
We will build our new world,
He who was nothing will become everything!

Chorus:
𝄆 This is our final
And decisive battle;
With the Internationale
Humanity will rise up! 𝄇

No one will grant us deliverance,
Not God, nor Tsar, nor hero.
We will win our liberation,
With our very own hands.
To throw down oppression with a skilled hand,
To take back what is ours —
Fire up the furnace and hammer boldly,
while the iron is still hot!

Chorus

You've sucked enough of our blood, you vampires,
With prison, taxes and poverty!
You have all the power, all the blessings of the world,
And our rights are but an empty sound!
We'll make our own lives in a different way —
And here is our battle cry:
All the power to the people of labour!
And away with all the parasites!

Chorus

Contemptible you are in your wealth,
You kings of coal and steel!
You had your thrones, parasites,
At our backs erected.
All the factories, all the chambers —
All were made by our hands.
It's time! We demand the return
Of that which was stolen from us.

Chorus

Enough of the will of kings
Stupefying us into the haze of war!
War to the tyrants! Peace to the people!
Go on strike, sons of the army!
And if the tyrants tell us
To fall heroically in battle for them —
Then, murderers, we will point
The muzzles of our cannons at you!

Chorus

Only we, the workers of the worldwide
Great army of labour,
Have the right to own the land,
But the parasites — never!
And if the great thunder rolls
Over the pack of dogs and executioners,
For us, the sun will forever
Shine on with its fiery beams.

Chorus

==== Soviet cinema and theatre ====
Dmitry Shostakovich used "The Internationale" twice for the soundtrack to the 1936 Soviet film Girl Friends, once performed by a military-style band when a group of women are preparing for war, and a second time as a solo performance on a theremin.

Nikolai Evreinov's 1920 The Storming of the Winter Palace used both "The Internationale" and "La Marseillaise" symbolically in opposition to each other, with the former sung by the "Red platform" proletariat side and the latter sung by the "White platform" government side, the former starting weakly and in disarray but gradually becoming organised and drowning out the latter.

==== Toscanini and Hymn of the Nations ====
The change of the Soviet Union's national anthem from "The Internationale" to the "State Anthem of the USSR" was a factor in the production of the 1944 film Hymn of the Nations, which made use of an orchestration of "The Internationale" that Arturo Toscanini had already done the year before for a 1943 NBC radio broadcast commemorating the twenty-sixth anniversary of the October Revolution.

It was incorporated into Verdi's Inno delle nazioni alongside the national anthems of the United Kingdom (already in the original) and the United States (incorporated by Toscanini for a prior radio broadcast of the Inno in January of that year) to signify the side of the Allies during the Second World War.

Toscanini's son Walter remarked that an Italian audience for the film would see the significance of Arturo being willing to play these anthems and unwilling to play Giovinezza and the Marcia Reale because of his anti-Fascist political views. Alexandr Hackenschmied, the film's director, expressed his view that the song was "ormai archeologico" (nearly archaeological), but this was a countered in a letter by Walter Toscanini to Giuseppe Antonio Borgese, rejecting the objections of Borgese, Hackenschmied, and indeed the Office of War Information.

At the time, Walter stated that he believed that "The Internationale" had widespread relevance across Europe, and in 1966 he recounted in correspondence that the OWI had "panicked" when it had learned of the Soviet Union's plans, but Arturo had issued an ultimatum that if "The Internationale", "l'inno di tutte le glebe ed i lavoratori di tutto il mondo" (the anthem of the working classes of the whole world) was not included, that if the already done orchestration and performance were not used as-is, then they should forget about distributing the film entirely.

The inclusion of "The Internationale" in the Toscaninis' minds was not simply for the sake of a Soviet Union audience, but because of its relevance to all countries of the world. Although Walter did not consider "The Internationale" to be "good music", he considered it to be (as he stated to the OWI) "more than the hymn of a nation or a party" and "an idea of brotherhood".

It would have been expensive to re-record a new performance of the Inno without "The Internationale", and thus it remained in the film as originally released. Some time during the McCarthy Era, however, it was edited out of re-released copies, and remained so until a 1988 Library of Congress release on video, which restored "The Internationale" to the film.

==== Winston Churchill and National Anthems of the Allies ====
A similar situation had occurred earlier in the war with the BBC's popular weekly Sunday evening radio broadcast, preceding the Nine O'Clock News, titled National Anthems of the Allies, whose playlist was all of the national anthems of the countries allied with the United Kingdom, the list growing with each country that Germany invaded. After the Germans began their invasion of the Soviet Union on 22 June 1941 (Operation Barbarossa), it was fully expected that "The Internationale", as the anthem of the Soviet Union, would be included in the playlist that day, but to people's surprise it was not, neither that week nor the week after. Winston Churchill, a staunch opponent of communism, had immediately sent word to the BBC via Anthony Eden that "The PM has issued an instruction to the Ministry of Information that the Internationale is on no account to be played by the B.B.C." (emphasis in the original).

Newspapers such as the Daily Express and Daily Mail were sharply critical of the Foreign Office, and questions were asked in the House of Commons. The ambassador Ivan Maisky recorded in his diary a conversation with Duff Cooper on 11 July 1941 where Cooper asked him if the music played after Vyacheslav Molotov's speech on 22 June would be acceptable to the Soviet Union, and he replied that it would not be. (The music was Tchaikovsky's 1812 Overture.) On the evening of 13 July, the BBC instead played, in Maisky's words, "a very beautiful but little-known Soviet song", which he described as demonstrating "the British Government's cowardice and foolishness". Rather than risk offending the Soviet Union by continuing to pointedly refuse to play its national anthem in a radio programme entitled National Anthems, the BBC discontinued the programme. Six months later, on 22 January 1942, Churchill relented and lifted the prohibition.

This relaxation enabled "The Internationale" to be used in wartime broadcasts and films, and at public occasions, thereafter. The BBC's 1943 Salute to the Red Army had a mass performance of "The Internationale" at the Royal Albert Hall by the choir of the Royal Choral Society, the BBC Symphony Orchestra, the London Philharmonic Orchestra, and military bands, in front of the flag of the Soviet Union and following a speech by Anthony Eden. The day before, which was Red Army Day, troops and the audience had sung "The Internationale" to the Lord Mayor of Bristol. The 1944 film Tawny Pipit depicted schoolchildren in the fictional village of Lipton Lea welcoming the character Olga Boclova (based upon Ludmilla Pavlichenko) to their town by singing "The Internationale".

=== China ===
Qu Qiubai revised the translation of the lyrics into Chinese after having attended the Fourth Conference of Comintern in November 1921 and having not been able to join in the spontaneous singing by attendees there of "The Internationale" in their various home languages with their own Chinese rendition because the Chinese attendees did not have a good one. He proceeded, according to the political memoirs of his contemporaries, in 1923 to re-translate the lyrics from the original French at the organ in his cousin's home in Beijing, publishing them in New Youth, a journal of which he was the editor-in-chief. The Internationale was played at the closing ceremony of the 3rd National Congress of the Chinese Communist Party in 1923. Since the Congress, it became standard for The Internationale to be played in the closing ceremonies of each National Congress held by the CCP. This has become part of the cultural narrative of Qu's life, including in a 2001 television dramatisation of events, The Sun Rises from the East, where Qu is depicted as explaining to Cai Hesen that the former did not translate the song's title because he wished to make the Chinese version, which used a phonetic rendering of the French name using Chinese words "yingtenaixiongnaier", accessible to a multi-lingual non-Chinese-speaking audience. The television dramatisation included excerpts from the film Lenin in October, a popular film in China during the time of Mao with scenes that were set to "The Internationale".

Lenin in October was one of several films from Soviet cinema translated into Chinese in the 1950s that led to the widespread popularity of "The Internationale" in the early years of the PRC. Others include Lenin in 1918, a 1939 film which came to China in 1951, with "The Internationale" abruptly terminated at the point in the film that Lenin is shot by an assassin; and the 1952 The Unforgettable 1919 which came to China that same year and used "The Internationale" for a mass rally scene involving Joseph Stalin. Chinese films about martyrs to the CCP cause would begin to incorporate the song into pivotal scenes later in the 1950s, this use peaking in the 1960s with inclusion into such films as the 1965 Living Forever in Burning Flames depicting the execution of Jiang Jie. In the 1956 film Mother, the character Lao Deng, a local revolutionary leader, is depicted singing "The Internationale" on the way to his execution, and in the 1960 A Revolutionary Family, the son of the protagonist (in chorus with his fellow prisoners) also sings "The Internationale" on the way to his execution. It would become a leitmotif of Chinese Revolutionary (model) cinema.

Political memoirs of Li Dazhao's daughter Li Xinghua recount his explaining the lyrics of the song to her, he having encountered it on his travels with Qu in 1923 and during his visit to Moscow the following year. He also encouraged people to sing it during socialist activism training sessions in 1925 and 1926. As with Qu, the song forms part of the cultural narrative of his life, it being the widely accepted account of his execution in 1927 that he sang the song in the last moments of his life. As with Qu and Li, the song is found in many places in political histories of CCP leaders and martyrs to its cause, symbolising their socialist ideals, including Zhu De, Zhou Enlai, and Deng Xiaoping. It has also seen continued, and sometimes contradictory, uses over the decades as politics in China have changed, such as (for one example) Chen Yun's use in the 1960s to justify a new agricultural land allocation policy. It has maintained its status as a de facto CCP anthem, and its continued relevance over the decades can be seen in its inclusion in all three of the 1964 The East Is Red, the 1984 The Song of the Chinese Revolution, and the 2009 The Road to Prosperity.

While the song has a wide influence as an adjunct of official ideology, it has also been used in counter-cultural movements, such as the demonstrators in the 1989 Tiananmen Square protests singing it during their final retreat. Barbara Mittler maintains that this dual use of "The Internationale" by the government and by people demonstrating against it disproves any hypothesis that "a certain type of music 'depicts' a certain social environment". "The Internationale" continues to be popular with 21st century Chinese audiences, as exemplified by its reception by audience when sung at the second curtain call of the "Shocking" concert of Liu Han, Liao Changyong, and Mo Hualun.

Qu was hired as a translator for students at the Communist University of the Toilers of the East in Moscow, where he met Xiao San in 1922, who had newly arrived from France. There, Xiao was drawn into the performing arts as a vehicle for revolutionary messages and, in conjunction with other students, translated "The Internationale" and several Soviet songs from the original French and Russian into Chinese, separately from Qu's work in Beijing in 1923. Xiao re-worked his translation in 1939, adding to it an explanatory history. Ironically, the translation in the television dramatisation The Sun Rises from the East that is recited by the character of Qu, is not in reality Qu's translation at all, but is the 1949 official approved translation based upon Xiao's, that is additionally credited to Zheng Zhenduo. The 2004 film My Years in France, a biographical film of Deng Xiaoping, re-framed this history into a dramatic scene, set in 1920s Paris before Xiao leaves for Moscow, in which Zhou Enlai, Liu Qingyang, Zhang Shenfu, and others climb to the top of Notre Dame to sing "The Internationale" to the accompaniment of its bell Emmanuel, and the character of Xiao resolves at that point, instead, to translate the song into Chinese.

In addition to the Mandarin version, "The Internationale" also has Cantonese and Taiwanese Hokkien versions, occasionally used by communists or leftists in Hong Kong and Taiwan. The word "Internationale" is not translated in either version. There is also a Uyghur version, a Salar version, a Tibetan version, a Hmong version, a Chakhar Mongolian version, a Yi version, and a Zhuang version translated from the Mandarin Chinese version, used for ethnic minorities in China.

=== Other languages ===
==== Afrikaans translation ====
In the first half of the twentieth century, communists, unionists and activists of all races in South Africa sang the Internationale until the Communist Party and even loosely linked associations were suppressed from 1950. Although no Afrikaans translation from the early period has been published, Afrikaans-speaking unionists worked in significant numbers in the garment industry in the 1920s and 1930s, and were introduced to international socialism by the union secretary Solly Sachs. The Afrikaans translation that is available today, in the wake of the SACP's return to South Africa in 1990, is a distinctly post-apartheid version (2009) by the singer-sociologist Liela Groenewald. In this video, Liela Groenewald is accompanied by the brown South African musician Mervin Williams; their collaboration reflects the post-apartheid acknowledgement of Afrikaans as the language of a majority of brown (and a few black) in addition to white South Africans. English-speakers have sung a version of the British translation; for information on the Zulu version, see the paragraph on Zulu below.

==== Armenian translations ====
"The Internationale" has been translated into both standards of the Armenian language, Eastern and Western. The most famous Eastern Armenian translation, published in Moscow in 1928, was made by the revolutionary poet Yeghishe Charents, with musical arrangement by Romanos Melikian.

==== Bengali translation ====
"The Internationale" was first translated to Bengali by the rebel poet Kazi Nazrul Islam. Nazrul, who was greatly inspired by the tenets of Socialism and its relevance to India under British colonial occupation, authored numerous poems in Bengali highlighting socio-political issues, including gender and economic inequities, and social justice overall. Around 1927, Nazrul was approached by Muzaffar Ahmad, one of the Founders of the Communist Party of India, requesting that he translate the celebrated song into Bengali. While it maintains the essential theme of the original (via the English version), Nazrul inserted salient social issues into it within the Indian context. It was also translated by Hemanga Biswas and Mohit Banerji, that was subsequently adopted by West Bengal's Left Front.

==== English translations ====
The traditional British version of "The Internationale" is usually sung in three verses, while the American version, written by Charles Hope Kerr with five verses, is usually sung in two. The American version is sometimes sung with the phrase "the internationale", "the international soviet", or "the international union" in place of "the international working class". In English renditions, "Internationale" is sometimes sung as /ˌɪntərnæʃəˈnæli/ IN-tər-nash-ə-NAL-ee rather than the French pronunciation of [ɛ̃tɛʁnɑsjɔnal(ə)]. In modern usage, the American version also often uses "their" instead of "his" in "Let each stand in his place", and "free" instead of "be" in "Shall be the Human race".

Pete Seeger asked Billy Bragg to sing "The Internationale" with him at the Vancouver Folk Festival in 1989. Bragg thought the traditional English lyrics were archaic and unsingable (the Scottish musician Dick Gaughan and the former Labour MP Tony Benn disagreed), and composed a new set of lyrics. The recording was released on his album The Internationale along with reworkings of other socialist songs.

The English translation of a selection of Pottier's songs and speeches, Beyond the Internationale: Revolutionary Writings, includes, in addition to the traditional British version and Kerr's American version, a 1922 version endorsed by the Socialist Labor Party, as well as Bragg's adaptation and one by the Workers Party of Jamaica.

Commonwealth translation (Unknown, often attributed to Eugène Pottier)

Arise, ye slavelings, from your slumbers!
Arise, ye criminals of want!
For reason in revolt now thunders
And ends at last the age of cant.
Away now with all superstitions!
Servile masses, arise, arise!
We’ll change forthwith the old conditions
And spurn the dust to win the prize.

Chorus
Then, comrades, let us rally,
The last fight let us face;
L'Internationale
Unites the human race.

No saviors from on high deliver,
No trust have we in prince or peer;
Our own right hands the chains must shiver,
Chains of hatred, greed and fear.
Before the thieves disgorge their booty
And give to all a happier lot,
Each at his forge must do his duty
And strike the iron while 'tis hot.

Chorus

We're tricked by laws and regulations;
The taxes strip us to the bone;
The rich enjoy the wealth of nations,
The poor have naught to call their own.
Long have we in vile bondage languished,
Yet we are equal, every one;
No rights, but duties, for the vanquished,
We claim our rights for duties done.

Chorus

The kings of mines, and ships and railways,
Resplendent in their vulgar pride,
Have plied their task to exploit always
Those whose toil they've e'er decried.
Great is the spoil held in their coffers,
To be spent on themselves alone;
We'll seize it some day, spite of scoffers,
And feel that we have got our own.

Chorus

The kings defile us with their powder,
We want no war within the land;
Let soldiers strike; for peace call louder,
Lay down your arms; join hand in hand.
Should these vile monsters still determine
Heroes to make us in despite,
They'll know full soon the kind of vermin
Our bullets hit in this last fight.

Alternate 5th verse

No more deluded by reaction
On tyrants only we’ll make war
The soldiers too will take strike action
They’ll break ranks and fight no more
And if those cannibals keep trying
To sacrifice us to their pride
They soon shall hear the bullets flying
We’ll shoot the generals on our own side.

Chorus

We peasants, artisans and others,
Enrolled among the sons of toil;
Let's claim the earth henceforth for brothers,
And drive the idler from the soil.
A long time our flesh has fed the raven,
For too long we've been the vulture's prey;
But now farewell, this spirit craven,
The dawn brings in a brighter day.

Chorus

American Translation (Charles H Kerr)

Arise, ye pris'ners of starvation!
Arise, ye wretched of the earth!
For justice thunders condemnation,
A better world's in birth!
No more tradition's chains shall bind us,
Arise ye slaves, no more in thrall!
The earth shall rise on new foundations,
We have been naught, we shall be all.

Chorus
"Tis the final conflict,
Let each stand in his place.
The International Party
Shall be the human race.

Alternate chorus used in modern recordings
'Tis the final conflict,
Let each stand in their place.
The International Working Class
Shall free the human race.

We want no condescending saviors
To rule us from a judgment hall;
We workers ask not for their favors;
Let us consult for all.
To make the thief disgorge his booty
To free the spirit from its cell,
We must ourselves decide our duty,
We must decide, and do it well.

Chorus

The law oppresses us and tricks us,
Taxation drains the victim’s blood;
The rich are free from obligations,
The laws the poor delude.
Too long we’ve languished in subjection,
Equality has other laws;
"No rights," says she "without their duties,
No claims on equals without cause."

Chorus

Behold them seated in their glory
The kings of mine and rail and soil!
What have you read in all their story,
But how they plundered toil?
Fruits of the people's work are buried
In the strong coffers of a few;
In voting for their restitution
The men will only ask their due.

Chorus

Toilers from shops and fields united,
The party we of all who work;
The earth belongs to us, the people,
No room here for the shirk.
How many on our flesh have fattened;
But if the noisome birds of prey
Shall vanish from the sky some morning,
The blessed sunlight still will stay.

Chorus

Socialist Labor Party Translation

Stand up! Ye wretched ones who labor,
Stand up! Ye galley-slaves of want.
Man’s reason thunders from its crater,
‘Tis th’ eruption naught can daunt.
Of the past let us cleanse the tables,
Mass enslaved, fling back the call,
Old Earth is changing her foundations,
We have been nothing, now be all.

Chorus
‘Tis the last call to battle!
Close the ranks, each in place,
The staunch old International
Shall be the Human race.

There are no saviors e’er will help us,
Nor God, nor Caesar, nor Tribune,
’tis ours, O workers, must the blows be
That shall win the common boon.
From the thief to wring his stolen booty,
From its prison to free the soul.
’tis we ourselves must ply the bellows,
‘Tis we must beat the anvil’s roll.

Chorus

The state is false, the law mockery,
And exploitation bows us down;
The rich man flaunts without a duty,
And the poor man’s rights are none.
Long enough have we in swaddling languished,
Lo, Equality’s new law
“Away with rights that know no duties,
Away with duties shorn of rights.”

Chorus

All hideous in their brutal lordship
Stand king of mill and mine and rail.
When have they e'er performed a service,
Or at work done aught but quail?
In the coffers of these robber barons,
Blind the world’s great wealth is thrown,
In summ'ning them to restitution,
The people seeks but what’s its own.

Chorus

The Kings, they smother us in gun- smoke;
Oh, peace between us, War to them!
The strike! Apply it to the armies,
Fire in air, break ranks again!
And if still these cannibals and tyrants
Would of us make "heroes" curst,
Soon shall they learn that our own Generals
Will taste our rifle fire first!

Chorus

Toilers from shop and field united,
The Party we of all who work;
The earth belongs to those who labor,
Hence! the idler and the shirk!
Say, how many on our flesh have feasted?
But if all this vampire flight
Should vanish from the sky some morning,
The sun will still shine on us as bright!

Chorus

==== Filipino translation ====
There were three Filipino versions of the song. The first was composed by Juan Feleo of the Partido Komunista ng Pilipinas-1930 under the title "Pandaigdigang Awit ng Manggagawa" ('The International Worker's Anthem') which was translated from the English version. The second version was a retranslation of the first two stanzas on the basis of the French original by the Communist Party of the Philippines. The third version, which introduced the third stanza, was derived from both Chinese and French versions and translated by Jose Maria Sison, the CPP's founding chairman.

==== German translations ====
The best-known and still widespread German-language adaptation was created by Emil Luckhardt in 1896, in response to a commission from Wilhelm Liebknecht, member of the Socialist Party of Germany and one of the leaders of the Second International after Liebknecht heard the French original in Lille in 1894. Luckhardt translated the first, second, and sixth verses as well as the chorus from the French. Created in the context of the Second International, Luckhardt's text reflects the late 19th-century optimism of the Second International anticipating an imminent revolution.

Apart from Luckhardt's version, there are at least seven other German text variants—each relating to specific historical situations or ideologically divergent socialist, communist and anarchist alignments. In addition to the Luckhardt version mentioned above, there is a version penned by Franz Diederich (1908), and another written by the poet Erich Mühsam in 1919, Sigmar Mehring's version (1908) appeared after his 1915 death in a collection of songs of the Paris Commune edited in 1924 by his son Walter Mehring. In 1937, at which time German socialists and communists were scattered in exile, Erich Weinert, wrote a new version for the Thälmann Brigade fighting for the Republicans during the Spanish Civil War, Weinert's version became the standard in East Germany, where it was reprinted in a 1971 edition containing English, Russian, German and the original French, in commemoration of the centennial of the Paris Commune.

==== Indonesian/Malay translations ====
"The Internasionale" was known in the Dutch East Indies since the early 1920s. One of the earliest Indonesian/Malay adaptations was made by Suwardi Suryaningrat, later known as Ki Hadjar Dewantara as Indonesia's future Minister of Education, from a Dutch text. The adaptation was published in May 1920, although there are conflicting accounts regarding the media and publication date, namely either Het Indische Volk No. 28 on May 1, 1920, or Sinar Hindia No. 87 on May 5, 1920. The adaptation then circulated among labour, student, and left-wing movements in the Dutch East Indies and Indonesia. Ki Hadjar Dewantara was neither a member of the Communist Party of Indonesia (PKI), then as the Indische Sociaal Democratische Vereeninging (ISDV), nor a member of the Sarekat Islam's red faction. It was reported that he was largely driven by a socialist, anti-capitalist, anti-imperialist notion which he hoped would contribute to the rise of Indonesian nationalism. Academics Budi Prihartanto and Y. Edhi Susilo have argued that Ki Hadjar's translation was adapted to local conditions at the time.

On December 19, 1948, Amir Sjarifuddin, along with ten figures associated with the Madiun Affair, reportedly sang "Indonesia Raya" and "Internasionale" before being executed. A second version, prepared by the PKI after 1951, came to be regarded as the official version until 1965, though it is unclear from which translation the PKI used. The Central Committee of the PKI was largely criticized by other international communist parties for having "removed the song’s proletarian spirit." Both Ki Hadjar's version and the PKI version were also later criticized by Indonesian leftist groups, including the Sixth March Collective, for undermining the spirit of the Paris Commune or the spirit of the proletariat. Another version was later created by A. Yuwinu and published on May 31, 1970, based on a comparison of Chinese and Russian texts. This translation was then adjusted to the Enhanced Spelling (EYD) guidelines which came into effect on August 17, 1972.

In late 1971, in the context of the centenary of the Paris Commune, an adaptation by the Sixth March Collective, attributed to Soepeno, Utuy Tatang Sontani, Agus J., and Suar Suroso, appeared, with references to the French version and comparisons with Russian, English, Chinese, German, and Dutch versions. Beyond so, there is the Ayik Umar Said version, the post-Suharto labour union version, and the Indonesian Trade Union Association (Gabungan Serikat Buruh Indonesia; GSBI) version.

==== Korean translations ====
"The Internationale" is used in both Koreas, though it is more commonly used in the North. The DPRK uses "The Internationale" in propaganda and music, Party Congresses, and even sports events. In South Korea, "The Internationale" has been used by labour unions and protestors, but remains less celebrated. A different set of lyrics, loosely based on the German version, is used in South Korea, while the North Korean version is based on the Soviet Russian version of "The Internationale". In addition, the refrain of the South Korean version is longer and does not repeat.

==== Persian translations ====
For the first time, Abolqasem Lahouti, an Iranian poet and songwriter, translated and standardised "The Internationale" into Persian. It was used as the official anthem of the short-lived Persian Socialist Soviet Republic and one of the main anthems of the communist Tudeh Party of Iran. In addition, after he settled in the Soviet Union, he translated his work into Tajik.

==== Portuguese translations ====
Originally translated to Portuguese by Neno Vasco in 1909 from the French version, a similar version was wildly disseminated during the general strike of 1917 by anarchists and anarcho-syndicalists. A slightly modified version is used various left-wing and far-left parties in Brazil.

==== Spanish translations ====
There are several Spanish versions, with distinct variations but without any attribution to single authors. The earliest is still sung by the Spanish Communist Party but it was apparently produced around 1910, before the split between Socialist and Communist parties across Europe around 1920. This version is also supported by the ruling Communist Party in Cuba. The Mexican version, in contrast, is based on earlier versions of "The Internationale", suggesting that it dates to the Mexican Revolution. The Argentine version was associated with the Argentine Socialist Party from 1958 to the junta of the generals in 1976.

In Latin America, "The Internationale" has also been translated into different indigenous languages, including Aymara, Guaraní, Nahuatl, and Quechua.

==== Swahili translation ====
In Kenya, "The Internationale" was translated into Swahili by the Communist Party Marxist - Kenya. It was declared the group's anthem during the second national congress in November 2024. Known as Wimbo wa Kimataifa, the Internationale, was translated by the then-party chairman, Mwandawiro Mghanga and performed by the party's band and released in a bundled album, together with other revolutionary songs and poems.

==== Vietnamese translation ====
The Vietnamese version of "The Internationale" was first translated by Ho Chi Minh under the pseudonym "Nguyễn Ái Quốc". Later translations were made by Trần Phú and Lê Hồng Phong, whose version became the standard adopted by the Communist Party of Vietnam.

"Quốc tế ca"

Song
- Language: Vietnamese
- Composer: Pierre De Geyter
- Lyricists: Ho Chi Minh (first translation); Trần Phú and Lê Hồng Phong (standard version)

Vietnamese translation	Literal translation
Vùng lên hỡi các nô lệ ở thế gian! Vùng lên hỡi ai cực khổ bần hàn! Sục sôi nhiệt huyết trong tâm đầy chứa rồi Quyết phen này sống chết mà thôi.	Arise, you slaves of the world! Arise, you who are poor and suffering! Boiling enthusiasm fills the heart This time we are determined to live or die.
Chế độ xưa ta mau phá sạch tan tành Toàn nô lệ vùng đứng lên đi Nay mai cuộc đời của toàn dân khác xưa, Bao nhiêu quyền lợi tất qua tay mình.	The old regime we quickly destroy completely All slaves, rise up! Tomorrow, the life of all people will be different All rights will come into our hands.
Đấu tranh này là trận cuối cùng, Kết đoàn lại để ngày mai Lanh-téc-na-xi-ô-na-lơ sẽ là xã hội tương lai.	This struggle is the final battle Unite together for tomorrow The Internationale will become the future society.
Đấu tranh này là trận cuối cùng, Kết đoàn lại để ngày mai Lanh-téc-na-xi-ô-na-lơ sẽ là xã hội tương lai.	This struggle is the final battle Unite together for tomorrow The Internationale will become the future society.

==== Yiddish translation ====
A Yiddish translation of "The Internationale" first appeared in the collection Yidishe folks-lider ('Yiddish Folk Songs') edited by Moshe Beregovski and Itzik Feffer. It was published in Kyiv, capital of what was then the Ukrainian Soviet Socialist Republic, in 1938. Judging from metaphors that the Yiddish shares with the Russian version—both have "mind" or "spirit" boiling rather than la raison tonne or "reason thunders" in the French—and the translators' location in the Soviet Union, it is likely that they were working from the Russian rather than the original French.

==== Zulu translation ====
A version of "The Internationale" in Zulu, South Africa's most populous language, aired on South African radio in 1990, after the South African Communist Party resurfaced after forty years of exile, The translator has not been identified but the Zulu version is likely to have been in circulation at party meetings and similar events since Zulu-speakers joined the SACP in the 1920s. The translation may have been penned or authorised by Moses Kotane, who was secretary-general of the SACP from 1939 until his death in exile in 1978. Although heard often on public occasions in the 1990s, such as at the state funeral for Joe Slovo, long-time SACP leader and minister of housing in Nelson Mandela's cabinet, in 1995, it has receded from public airing as the party has lost influence in South Africa.

=== Audio files ===
The American English version

The original British English version

Billy Bragg's British English version

The Bulgarian version

The Cuban Spanish version

The Dutch version

The Esperanto version

The French version

The Georgian version

The German version

The Hungarian version

The Italian version

The Indonesian version

The Lithuanian version

The Latvian version

The Mandarin version

The Mongolian version

The Nepali version

the Peruvian Spanish version

The South Korean version

The Ukrainian version

The Vietnamese version

=== Lyrics files ===
The Romanian version

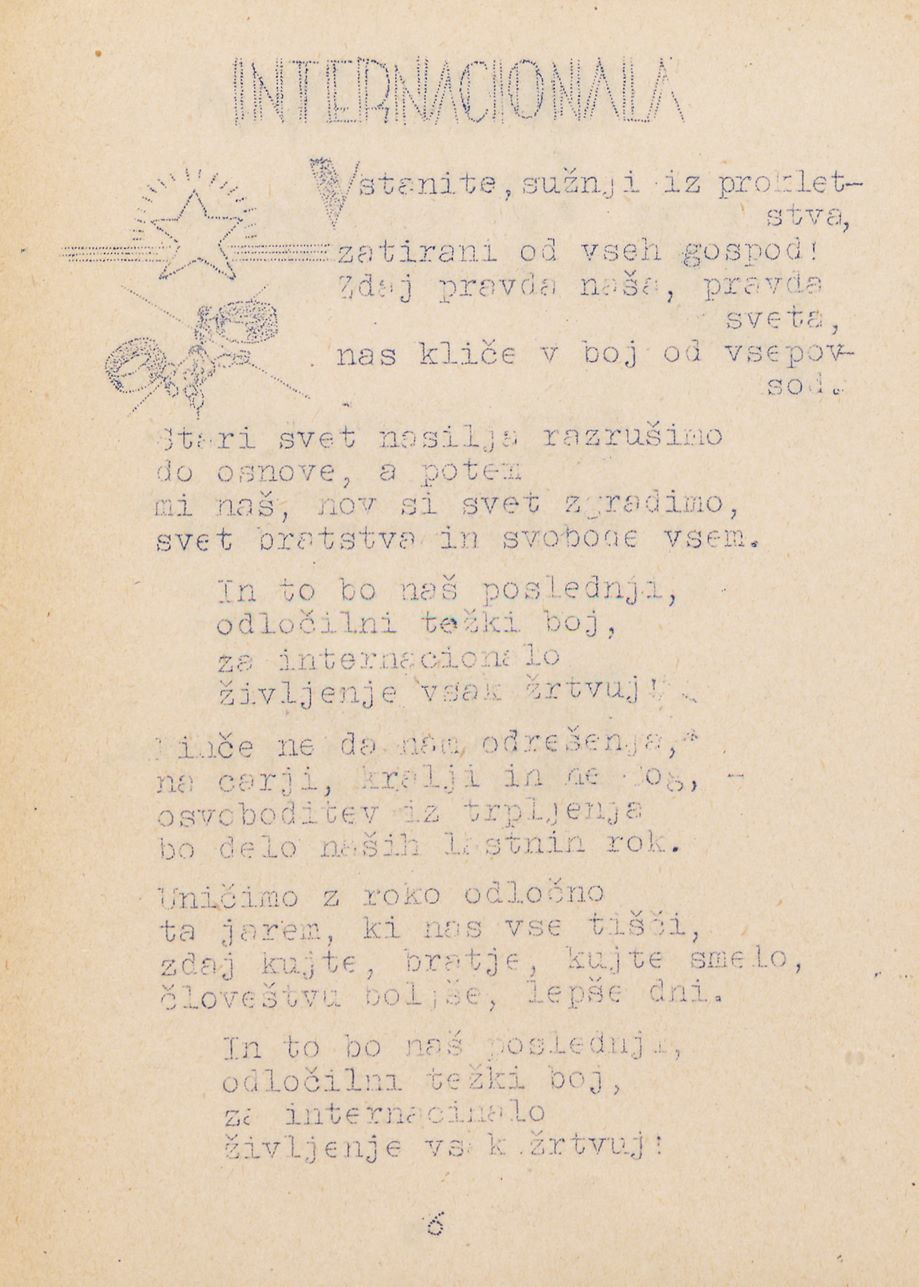
The Slovenian version

== Allusions in other works ==
The "anthem" Beasts of England, Beasts of Ireland in the early pages of George Orwell's Animal Farm, has been described as a "parody" or a "reconfiguration" of "The Internationale"; Orwell's text states (as a "humorous introduction") that it was sung as "between Clementine and La Cucaracha",

William Carlos Williams' poem Choral: The Pink Church alludes to the lyrics of "The Internationale" in order to symbolise Communism, the poem otherwise barely mentioning Communism directly, Williams himself claiming to be "a pink [...] not a red" in a letter discussing the poem.

One of Aleksandr Lebedev-Frontov's most famous works, which hung in the headquarters of the National Bolshevik Party, is a poster of the French Fantomas aiming a pistol at the viewer, subtitled with the first line of the Russian version of "The Internationale".

The melody was briefly quoted by English composer John Ireland in the horn part of his 1937 cantata These Things Shall Be, immediately after the word "paradise" near the end of the penultimate stanza. Ireland soon reconsidered the allusion, asked the critic Edwin Evans not to identify the tune in the programme notes, and replaced the horn passage after the work's first public performance.

The Russian poet Vladimir Mayakovsky concluded his play Mystery-Bouffe with an "Internationale of the Future", set to the tune of the Internationale, but with lyrics describing a complete, perfect classless society as an existing fact.

Even though it stood on the far-right of the political spectrum, the Greek political party Golden Dawn employed a tune similar to "The Internationale" as its party anthem, the Hymn of the Golden Dawn, with a more militaristic and fascistic sound in the style of a military march. Its similar melody to a communist song possibly stemmed from the admiration of some of its members, such as Greek MP Ilias Panagiotaros, for Soviet leader Joseph Stalin, as a "great personality".

== Documentary film on the anthem ==
Peter Miller produced and directed a half-hour documentary on the anthem with interviews with a range of people including Annette Rubinstein, Vladimir Grigoryevich Zak, Marina Feleo-Gonzalez, Pete Seeger, Dorothy Ray Healey, Li Lu and Billy Bragg. The film aims to provide a cultural history of the anthem that addresses the complexities of the relationships between the collective and the individual. The film was short-listed for the Academy Award nomination for the Best Short Documentary and won the Woodstock Film Festival, Best Short Documentary award.

== See also ==
- List of socialist songs
- Mongol Internationale (namesake)
- Tuvan Internationale (namesake)
