= Medal of the City of Paris =

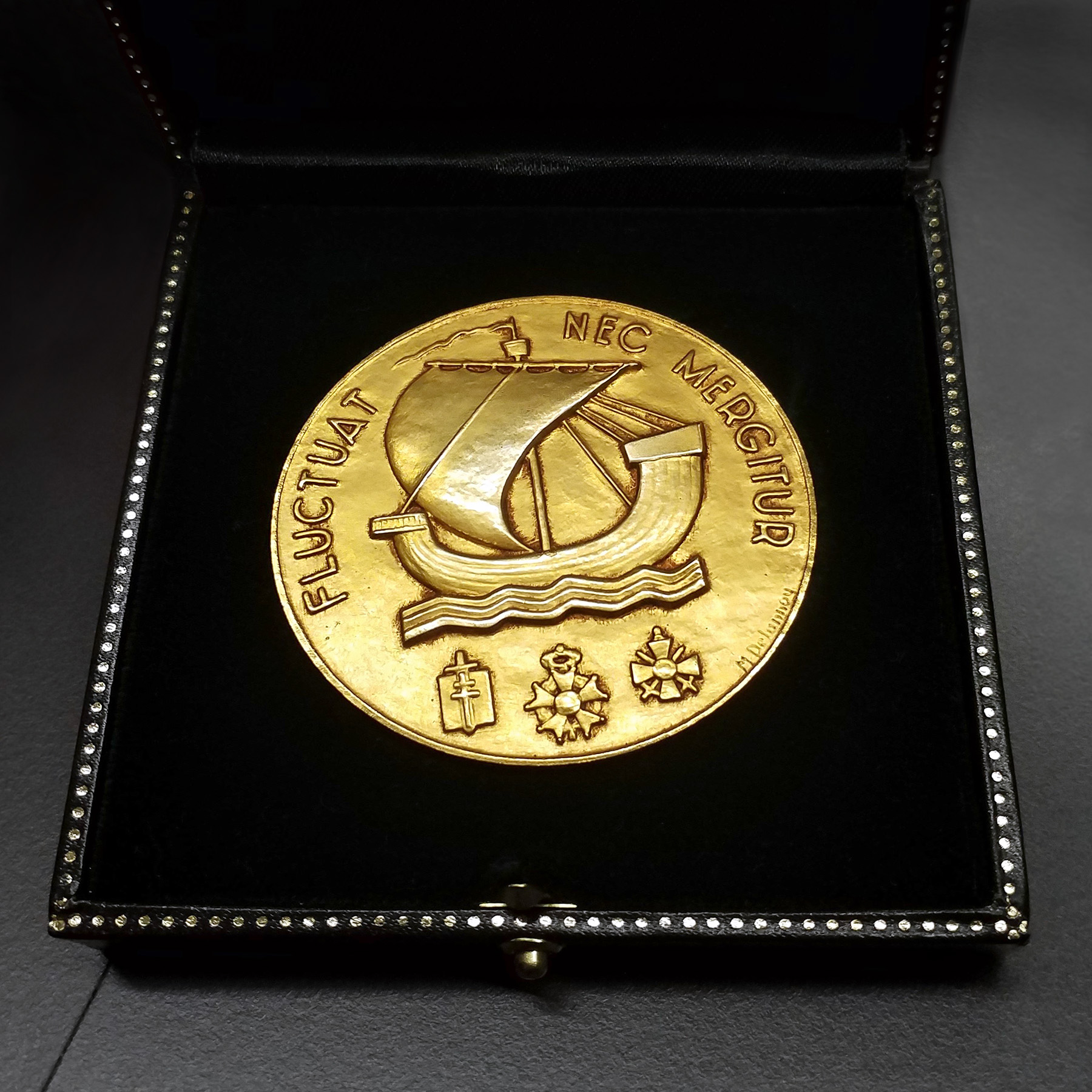
- Ayik Umar Said's Médaille de la Ville de Paris (in bronze)
- Country: France
- Presented by: Mayor of Paris
- Status: Active

The Medal of the City of Paris (French: Médaille de la Ville de Paris), established in 1911, is an honour in the gift of the Mayor by nomination of members of the Council of Paris and devolved administrations.

Awarded in four grades, viz. bronze, silver, large silver and vermeil, it recognises those achieving a "remarkable act concerning the capital" as well as being presented to centenary Parisians and couples celebrating their golden (50 years), diamond (60 years), platinum (70 years), alabaster (75) or oak (80) wedding anniversaries.

== List of recipients ==
- Julio Iglesias (Grand Vermeil 1983)
- Michael Jackson (Grand Vermeil 1988)
- Maurice Allais (Grand Vermeil 1989)
- Josy Eisenberg (Grand Vermeil 1993)
- Brigitte Bardot (Grand Vermeil 1994)
- Hayao Miyazaki (Grand Vermeil 2001)
- Kihachirō Kawamoto (Grand Vermeil 2003)
- Toni Morrison (Grand Vermeil 2004)
- Maggie Cheung（Grand Vermeil 2004）
- Jackie Chan (Grand Vermeil 2005)
- Diana Ross (Grand Vermeil 2005)
- Johnny Depp (Grand Vermeil 2006)
- Jerry Lewis (Grand Vermeil 2006)
- Robert Lamoureux (Grand Vermeil 2009)
- Cecilia Bartoli (Grand Vermeil 2010)
- Jane Fonda (Grand Vermeil 2010)
- Inès de La Fressange (Grand Vermeil 2010)
- Michel Galabru (Grand Vermeil 2011)
- Paolo Conte (Grand Vermeil 2011)
- Michael Lonsdale (Grand Vermeil 2011)
- Juliette Gréco (Grand Vermeil 2012)
- Ettore Scola (Grand Vermeil 2012)
- Henry Chapier (Grand Vermeil 2013)
- Vera Baboun (Grand Vermeil 2015)
- Herbie Hancock (Grand Vermeil 2015)
- Rafael Nadal (Grand Vermeil 2015)
- Mahmoud Abbas (2015; rescinded 2023) by Mayor Anne Hidalgo for anti-Semitism
- Michel Legrand (Grand Vermeil 2016)
- Cyril Lignac (Grand Vermeil 2016)
- Zlatan Ibrahimovic (Grand Vermeil 2016)
- Patti Smith (Grand Vermeil 2017)
- Karl Lagerfeld (Grand Vermeil 2017)
- Pierre Rabhi (Grand Vermeil 2017)
- Mamoudou Gassama (Grand Vermeil 2018)
- Garo Paylan (Grand Vermeil 2018)
- Hocine Ziani (Grand Vermeil 2019)
- Pia Klemp (Grand Vermeil 2019) declined
- Carola Rackete (Grand Vermeil 2019) declined
