= Ayik Umar Said =

Indonesian-born French journalist and activist (1928–2011)

- Born: Ayik Umar Said; 26 October 1928; Pakis, Malang, East Java, Dutch East Indies
- Died: 8 October 2011 (aged 82); Noisy-le-Grand, France
- Citizenship: French, Indonesian
- Occupation: Journalist
- Organizations: Indonesia Raya; Ekonomi Nasional; Harian Rakjat; Chine Express
- Awards: Medal of the City of Paris
- Website: umarsaid.gitlab.io

André Aumars (Note: Umar Said's legal name as he was a French naturalised citizen.) (26 October 1928 – 8 October 2011), born Ayik Umar Said, was an Indonesian-born French journalist and activist. Umar Said is best known for his contributions to the Indonesian delegation at the Tricontinental Conference in Cuba in 1966 and his political writings against the reign of Suharto of the mid-1960s and on the 30 September Movement, and to the Parisian cooperative restaurant Indonesia which acted as a political refuge during the 1990s. His journalistic contributions include those to Indonesia Raya, Ekonomi Nasional in 1965 where he was editor-in-chief, Harian Rakjat, and his own monthly Chine Express which detailed the actualities of Chinese politics during the 1980s and 90s.

== Biography ==
=== Early life ===
Umar Said was born on 26 October 1928, two days before the Youth Pledge, in a village called Tumpang in Pakis, Malang, East Java in the Dutch East Indies. His father, Hardjowinoto, a headteacher at a local school in Karangsemi, a village in the Nganjuk Regency, near Ngrajeg and Baron, was an admirer of Oemar Said Tjokroaminoto, an Indonesian nationalist, hence his namesake. During his years in the local junior high school in Kediri, starting from 1942, he became diligently interested in the Japanese language.

During the August Revolution, he was captivated by the Indonesian independence movement. After the Japanese surrender on 19 August 1945, ideas of an independentist revolution began to brew. In the months of September and October 1945, he and his friend living in Ngrajeg began collecting donations in passenger trains to fund the movement. During these times, he visited the Indonesian People's Revolutionary Front headquarters in Surabaya. Umar Said, with the help of a delegation of Indonesian Youth Force (Indonesian: Angkatan Muda Indonesia) under the chief of the state police and other young activists, then travelled back to Surabaya to spread revolutionary influence in Sumatra. Upon arriving in Palembang, he met with Adnan Kapau Gani, who was fluent in English and had connections with representatives of the Allied forces, and who greatly influenced him.

In November 1945, he joined the People's Security Agency during the Indonesian National Revolution to participate in the Battle of Surabaya, arriving in Wonokromo. During the battle, he and his troop were given the task of patrolling or keeping certains posts in districts, among others, Keputran, Tambaksari, Undakan, and Gunungsari. Following the defeat of the Indonesian resistance, he returned to Kediri briefly then to Karangsemi. Following his mother's advice, he decided to continue his high school education in Yogyakarta where he studied English, French, and German in SMA Taman Madya high school.

In 1947, the financial state of his family, and of the time period in general, was getting worse so he got his first job as a public primary school teacher in Bandarangin near Malang at age 19, teaching Earth science; after six months, he moved back to Surabaya, finding a new job.

=== Journalism ===
Umar Said began to work at Indonesia Raya at its inception in 1949 as an editor. He accompanied President Sukarno with a group of a journalists for his first official trip to the then State of East Indonesia. In 1955, Umar Said participated in the Bandung Conference, writing several reports of its importance to international cooperation.

In 1960, he became editor-in-chief of Ekonomi Nasional while participating in the Indonesian Journalists Association. During this time, he befriended Joesoef Isak, a resistant editor under the dictatorship of Suharto. Three years later, he became treasurer of the Afro-Asian Journalist Association (AAJA). His knowledge of many languages made extensive travelling easy for him, to countries like Egypt, Sudan, Uganda, Tanzania, Somalia, Ethiopia, and Kenya. In 1963, the international conference in Hanoi allowed him to meet Ho Chi Minh.

In September 1965, Umar Said attended the conference of the International Organization of Journalists in Santiago.

=== Exile and installation in France ===
In 1965, when Sukarno was deposed, Umar Said left the country and took up residence in China, spending seven years in the framework of the International Organization of Journalists. During this period, Umar Said became director of the office of the PWAA secretariat. In 1966, he participated in the Tricontinental Conference in Havana and met on this occasion Fidel Castro.

He endured difficulties during the Cultural Revolution and left, arriving in France as a political refugee in 1973. At the time, he had opened a bookstore, The Phoenix (French: Le Phoenix), specializing on China. Thanks to his networks of solidarity, Umar Said was then offered a position at the Mutual Aid Society of the French Ministry of Agriculture and Food Supply (SMAR; French: Société de secours Mutuels du personnel du ministère de l'Agriculture et du Ravitaillement). During this period, important meetings were held for him with Cimade, the Comité catholique contre la faim et pour le développement, Amnesty International, the French Socialist Party and other political non-governmental organizations like France land of asylum (French: France terre d'asile) or, later, the Danielle Mitterrand Foundation – France Liberties by (French: Fondation Danielle-Mitterrand – France Libertés).

In or after 1978 he was reunited with his wife and children there. It was after his arrival in France that he assumed the name André Aumars.

=== Cooperative restaurant Indonesia ===
In 1982, after the liberation of political prisoners from Buru Island and other prisons, Umar resigned from the French Ministry of Agriculture and began to prepare the creation of the cooperative Scop Fraternity, founded by four representatives of the Indonesian political refugee community and four French nationals. The cooperative took the form of the restaurant Indonesia, which was officially founded on 14 December 1982.

=== Other projects ===
In 1988, Umar created a new company called China Documentation & Communication, a documentation and communication center on China. He was responsible for the editorial content and the production of an economic watch journal, Chine Express, as China opened up to the Western economy during the 1980s and 90s.

In 2000, he accompanied Danielle Mitterrand and a delegation of Danielle Mitterrand Foundation – France Liberties and other NGOs in Indonesia.

Umar Said launched in 2002 his website umarsaid.free.fr to keep a link with his country of origin, to defend human rights and democracy.

=== Tribute of Paris ===
On 24 January 2011, in the restaurant Indonesia, Umar Said received the Medal of the City of Paris for his career as a social innovator.

== Bibliography ==
- Umar Said, Ayik (2004). Perjalanan Hidup Saya [The Journey of My Life] (in Indonesian). Indonesia: Yayasan Pancur Siwah. ISBN 979-98252-7-X.
- Umar Said, Ayik; Adam, Asvi Warman (2004). Menguak peristiwa G30S : memahami sepenggal perjalanan bangsa : catatan sejarah bangsa yang diburamkan [Discovering the G30S Event: understanding a group of people: the history of blurred nations] (in Indonesian). Indonesia.

== Footnotes ==
=== Sources ===
- Umar Said, Ayik (2004). Perjalanan Hidup Saya [The Journey of My Life] (in Indonesian). Indonesia: Yayasan Pancur Siwah. ISBN 979-98252-7-X.
