= Loren Kruger =

South African academic

- Born: 7 January 1958 (age 68); Johannesburg, South Africa
- Citizenship: South African; American

Academic background
- Education: University of Cape Town (BA); Cornell University (MA, PhD)
- Thesis: Translating (for) the theatre: The appropriation, mise en scene and reception of theatre texts (1986)

Academic work
- Discipline: Theatre studies
- Institutions: University of Chicago
- Website: english.uchicago.edu/people/loren-kruger

Loren Adrienne Kruger (born 7 January 1958 in Johannesburg, South Africa) is a South African academic who taught at the University of Chicago from 1986 to 2024 and has written extensively on theatre, comparative literature, and urban studies.

== Education ==
Kruger obtained Bachelor of Arts in English and mathematics from the University of Cape Town, and worked in a teaching role at the University of Johannesburg in 1980. She received a PhD in comparative literature from Cornell University where she was a teaching assistant from 1981 to 1986. Kruger completed independent studies in Paris at the Institut d'études théâtrales of Sorbonne Nouvelle University and the Institut für Theaterwissenschaft at the Free University of Berlin.

== Career ==
Kruger's studies have focused on literature, theatre, and performing arts in various languages including Afrikaans, French, German, Spanish, and Zulu. She joined the University of Chicago in 1986. Before she departed in 2024, she held appointments in comparative literature, English, and theatre and performance studies, as well as affiliations in cinema and media studies, African studies and urban studies. She was the editor of Theatre Journal from 1996 to 1999 and contributing editor of Theatre Research International in 2002 and 2003. She is an active member of the International Federation for Theatre Research and the International Brecht Society.

Awards: Post-Imperial Brecht: Politics and Performance, East and South (Cambridge University Press, 2004) won the Scaglione Prize for Comparative Literary Study awarded by the Modern Language Association in 2005,

"On the Tragedy of the Commoner," an article on adaptations of classical tragedy by anti-apartheid and post-apartheid South African stages, won the Philadelphia Constantinidis Prize from the Comparative Drama Association.

=== Books ===
Kruger's first book, The National Stage: Theatre and Cultural Legitimation in England, France, and America, was published by the University of Chicago Press in 1992. It examines the role of theatre institutions in the creation of national publics, and describes national theaters in Central Europe that helped to facilitate the establishment of nation states. In 2004, Cambridge University Press published her book, Post-Imperial Brecht: Politics and Performance, South and East, which discusses Bertolt Brecht, links between the Global South and the Soviet empire, and Cold War-era imperialism. It won the Scaglione Prize for Comparative Literary Study from the Modern Language Association. In 2013, Kruger's book examining the apartheid history, turbulent culture, odd-shaped districts of Johannesburg was published by Oxford University Press, Imagining the Edgy City: Writing, Performing and Building Johannesburg. The term edgy city describes both the physical geography of speculative urban development and the nervousness of citizens amid urban turbulence.

Kruger's books and articles on theatre in South Africa, The Drama of South Africa (1999), and the updated Century of South African Theatre (2019), are considered the most historically comprehensive study of this topic.

=== Translations ===
- Beyond the Internationale: Revolutionary Writing by Eugene Pottier, a selection of songs, speeches and On the Tragedy of the Commoner," by the author of L'Internationale, also includes translations of adaptions of L'Internationale, his most famous song, in languages from Afrikaans to Zulu, via German, Spanish, and Yiddish among others,
- the translation and edition of German and English manuscripts of the autobiography of Leontine Sagan, the director of the film Mädchen in Uniform. published as Lights and Shadows: the Autobiography of Leontine Sagan by Wits University Press in Johannesburg.
- The Institutions of Art, essays by the literary historians Peter Bürger and Christa Bürger, translated from German and published by the University of Nebraska Press
- Theatre and the Crossroads of Culture by Patrice Pavis, translated from French and published by Routledge Press.

== Books ==
- A Century of South African Literature. London: Bloomsbury. 2019.
- Imagining the Edgy City: Writing, Performing and Building Johannesburg. Oxford: Oxford University Press. 2013.
- Post-Imperial Brecht: Politics and Performance, South and East. Cambridge: Cambridge University Press. 2004.
  - Winner: Scaglione Prize for Comparative Literary Study, Modern Language Association, 2005,
- The Drama of South Africa. London: Routledge, 1999
- The National Stage: Theatre and Cultural Legitimation in England, France, and America. Chicago: University of Chicago Press, 1992

=== Translations ===
- Pottier, Eugène (2024). Kruger, Loren (ed.). Beyond the Internationale: Revolutionary Writing. Translated by Kruger, Loren. Chicago: Charles H. Kerr.
- The Institutions of Art by Peter Bürger and Christa Bürger. Lincoln, NE: University of Nebraska Press, 1992
- Theatre at the Crossroads of Culture by Patrice Pavis. London: Routledge, 1991
- Lights and Shadows: the Autobiography of Leontine Sagan . Edited from Sagan's English and German manuscripts with an introduction by Loren Kruger. Johannesburg: Wits University Press, 1996
