= Eugène Pottier =

French socialist writer (1816–1887)

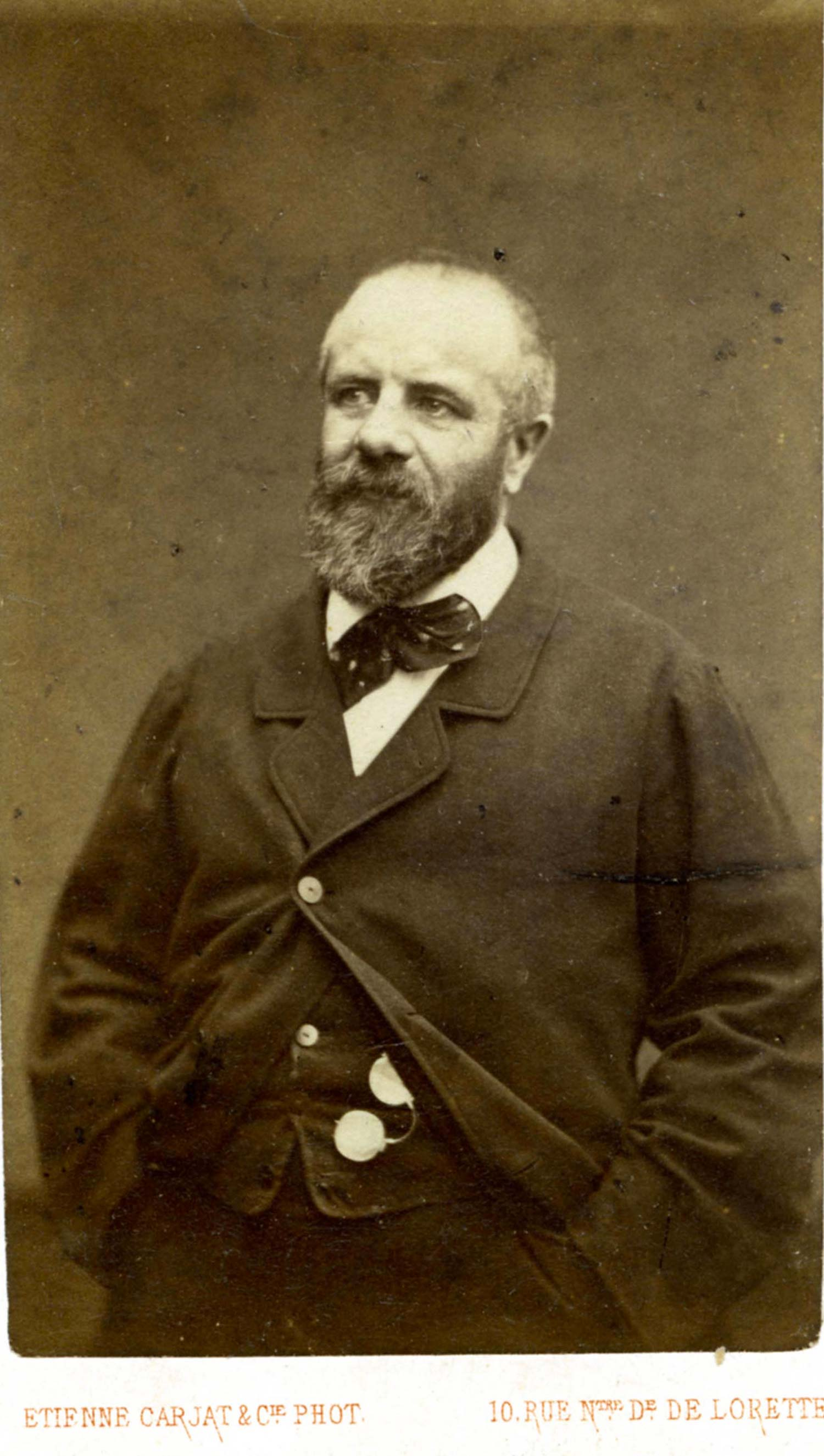
- Portrait of Pottier by Étienne Carjat, c. 1870. From the collection of the Musée de l'Histoire vivante
- Born: Eugène Edine Pottier; 4 October 1816; Paris, France
- Died: 6 November 1887 (aged 71); Paris, France
- Resting place: Père Lachaise Cemetery
- Era: 19th century
- Organizations: Freemasons; International Workingmen's Association
- Known for: Penning The Internationale
- Political party: SLP

Eugène Edme Pottier (French: [øʒɛn pɔtje]; 4 October 1816 – 6 November 1887) was a French revolutionary, poet, song-writer, and freemason. He is most known for writing the lyrics of "The Internationale", a left-wing anthem.

== Life and work in Paris ==
Pottier grew up as the son of a packer but later trained as an industrial textile designer, a profession that he celebrated in a poem called The Exposition, about the Paris Exposition of Industrial Design in 1861. He began writing songs already in his teens, inspired by the example of Pierre-Jean de Béranger, whose book he apparently discovered in an armoire. By the time of the French Revolution of 1848 and the brief Second Republic, he was writing and performing political songs in the company of other worker-songwriters or chansonniers as they were known in French. At a time when up to seventy percent of the French population was illiterate, these songs, called chansons sociales or socially critical songs, offered political mobilization as well as entertainment to working people, and were often set to familiar tunes to encourage singing along. His songs of this period include titles such as "Etats généraux du travail" [Estates General of Labor] "Liberté, égalité, fraternité, et gaité" (best translated as "Liberty, Equality, Fraternity--and Fun")

After the coup by Louis-Napoleon Bonaparte, who called himself Napoleon III, crushed the Second Republic in favor of the Second Empire, Pottier worked as an industrial designer. The Industrial Exposition of 1861 and the spread of the Second Empire Style benefitted artisans such as Pottier who claimed to be the "owner of the best design studio in Paris" at the time. Pottier's relative prosperity did not deter him from political activity. As censorship was relaxed after 1867, he joined the French affiliate of the International Workingmen's Association, which had been founded by Karl Marx and others in London in 1864 and became informally known as the First International. Pottier's songs from this period, while not as overtly political, still critiqued social and economic injustice, with titles such as "Ce que dit le pain" [What the Bread Says], or environmental destruction "La mort d'un globe" [Death of a World]. Others reflected his curiosity and engagement with science and industrial innovation in France and the world, in songs such as "La nouvelle ère" [The New Era], which celebrated the first trans-Atlantic telegraphic cable and with it instantaneous contact between Europe and North America.

Pottier died in poverty and illness in Paris on November 6, 1887. His tomb is located in Division 95 of Pere Lachaise Cemetery in Paris.

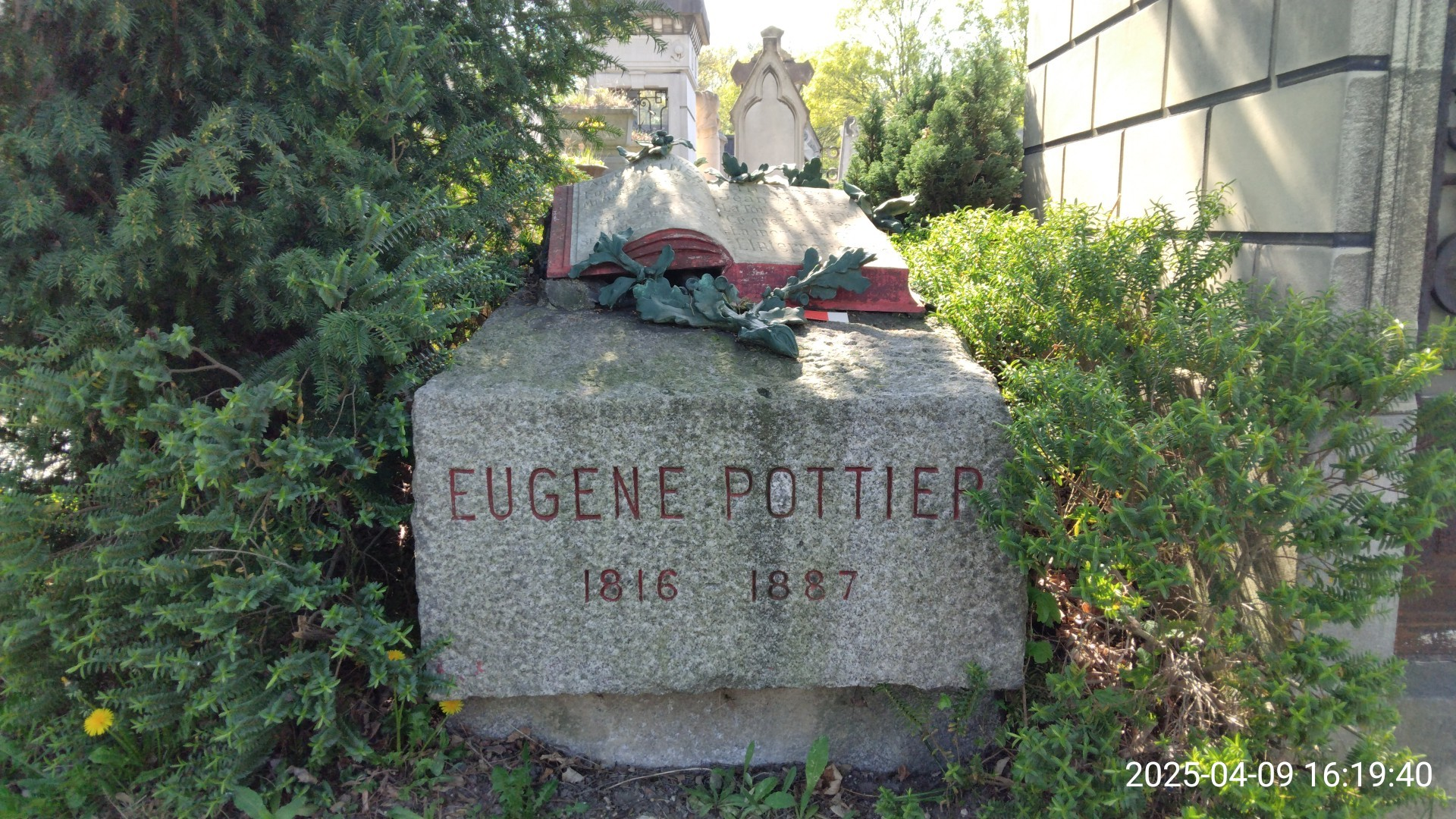
Eugene Pottier's tomb located in Division 95 of Pere Lachaise Cemetery, Paris, France

== Pottier and the Paris Commune of 1871 ==
As a member of the International, Pottier welcomed the abdication of Napoleon III after his war against Prussia collapsed in September 1870, and the ensuing declaration of the Third Republic and the Government of National Defense. He represented the second arrondissement of Paris in the radical Republican Central Committee in the attempted revolt of January 1871. This organization, along with the International and the Revolutionary Socialist Party supported by followers of Louis-Auguste Blanqui opposed giving up the guns and canon of the Parisian National Guards to the Government of National Defense. When this conservative republican government retreated to Versailles on 18 March Pottier was elected a member of the Paris municipal council, the Paris Commune, on 26 March 1871, representing first the second arrondissement and later, after the French army attacked from Versailles, the eleventh. In addition to representing these arrondissements, Pottier also served on the Commune's Federation of Artists which was chaired by the painter Gustave Courbet, all of which left him little time for writing songs. Only after the Commune fell to the army on 28 May, did he write L'Internationale, shortly before fleeing France first for Britain and then, in 1873, for the United States.

== U.S. exile and return to Paris ==
While in exile in New Jersey, Pottier made a precarious living teaching French but received support from other French exiles and from the freemason lodge, Les Égalitaires, which had been established in New York by French exiles already in the Second Empire and which he joined in 1875. In his cover letter, he said that Freemasonry was "composed of a group of freethinkers who, having made a clean sweep on tradition and recognizing nothing superior to human reason, consciously dedicate themselves in search of Truth and Justice". Although not well-known in the U.S., Pottier gave several speeches to commemorate the inaugural meeting of the U.S. Socialist Labor Party, Paterson, N.J chapter in 1878, and the anniversary of the Commune's founding on 18 March 1878; the latter was published as a pamphlet in New Jersey and as far away as San Francisco. During his U.S. exile, Pottier also wrote a number of songs and poems, including a long French poem with an English title, The Workingmen of American to the Workingmen of France (1876), which was addressed as if by an American workers delegation to the French workers visiting the Centennial Exposition in Philadelphia and which combines a celebration of the exposition with a critique of global capitalism and U.S. hegemony. By the time Pottier was able to return to Paris in 1881, after the French National Assembly passed the Amnesty Law, he was old and sick but nonetheless kept on writing songs. When "Chacun vit de son métier" [To Each His Trade] won the silver medal at La Lice Chansonnière (a workers' song competition) in 1883, Pottier resumed contact with his Communard comrades, especially Jean Allemane and Jules Vallès. Allemane published this and other popular songs by Pottier such as "Jean Misère (best translated as Johnny Misery) and "Political Economy" in pamphlet form and in a small anthology with a telling title, Poésies d'économie sociale et chansons socialistes révolutionnaires.

L'Internationale, however, did not appear in print until April 1887 in a collection of Pottier's songs called Chants révolutionnaires, likewise edited by Allemanne. In this collection, Pottier set his song to the tune of the 1792 anthem, La Marseillaise. It was sung in this form at Pottier' burial, in November 1887, which drew up to 10,000 mourners to the northeast section of Père Lachaise Cemetery according to eyewitness Ernst Museux. The setting that is usually sung today was composed only in July 1888 by Pierre De Geyter for the workers singing club Le Lyre Travailleur after a young socialist teacher Charles Gros shared it with the future mayor of the industrial town of Lille Gustave Delory. The Internationale was sung by the Parti ouvrier français (French Workers Party) and first translated into English in 1894 by American publisher Charles H. Kerr. After German socialist Wilhelm Liebknecht and other members of the Social Democratic Party of Germany attended an international socialist meeting at Lille in 1896, the Internationale was translated into German by Emil Luckhardt and adopted by the Second International. The first Russian translation followed in 1902 by Arkady Yakovievich Kots, who studied metallurgy in France at first heard the Internationale in Lille in 1899. This version served as the anthem of the Soviet Union from 1919 to 1940 and Vladimir Ilyich Ulyanov, aka Lenin, who admired the Commune, acknowledged the 25th anniversary of Pottier's death in a 1913 article in Pravda.

== Legacy ==
After Pottier's death, the Internationale became the anthem of the Second and later also the Third Internationale, often without his name attached. Many of his other songs circulated in individual pamphlets and in multiple editions of his Chants révolutionnaires between 1908, when the stone that now marks his grave was erected, and 1937, the fiftieth anniversary of his death. His collected works, including speeches and letters as well as songs and poems, was published by then-premier French leftist press François Maspero in 1966, and his songs, including the Internationale, recorded on several LPs printed to celebrate the centennial of the Commune in 1971 by record labels favoring chansons sociales such as Le Chant du monde. A selection of his poems was published in a pocket edition marking the bicentennial of Pottier's birth in 2016 by the publisher Le Temps de cerises, named in honor of a famous Commune song by Jean-Baptiste Clément. Other songs by Pottier such as La mort d'un globe [Death of a World]; Jean Misère [Johnny Misery], Elle [La Commune] n'est pas morte [The Commune did not die], L'économie politique {Political Economy] and Quand reviendra-t-elle? {When will the Commune return?] appear on the album La Commune refleurira [The Commune will bloom again] issued to commemorate the sesquicentennial of the Commune by the collective Les Ogres de Barback in 2021. These and other songs were published in English for the first time in 2024.

A key song on Barback album, The Commune did not die, written in Paris in May 1886, may celebrate not only the Communard dead and their French socialist inheritors but also activists in the International Working Peoples Association killed in the Haymarket incident in Chicago that month. Even if Pottier does not mention the Haymarket, his younger contemporary Jules Jouy wrote at least two songs about the Haymarket in 1887, after several had been tried and, in four cases, executed for their political views. Pottier's song begins by naming some of those, such as Eugène Varlin and Théophile Ferré, who were shot during the last days of the Commune but he ends in defiance, in terms that, like the 150th anniversary album, anticipate its return:

Bref, tout ça prouve aux combattants
Que Marianne a la peau brune
Du chien dans l'ventre et qu'il est temps
De crier "Vive la Commune!"
Et ça prouve à tous les Judas
Que si ça marche de la sorte,
Ils sentiront dans peu
Nom de Dieu!
Que la Commune n'est pas morte!

In English:

In short, this proves to those who fought
Our Marianne is well tanned
And that it is time to shout
Vive La Commune! again.
And it proves to every Judas
That it will come by and by
That they will see it soon enough, my God,
The Commune did not die!

== Works ==
- Poêsies d'économie sociale et chansons socialistes révolutionnaires. Ed. Jean Allemane. Paris: Oriol, 1884
- Quel est le fou? Songs. Ed. Jean Allemane. Preface by Gustave Nadaud. Paris; Oriol, 1884.
- Chants révolutionnaires. Preface by Henri Rochefort. Comments by Gustave Nadaud and Jules Vallès. Paris: Dentu, 1887
- Oeuvres complètes d'Eugène Pottier. Collected, edited and annotated by Pierre Brichion. Paris: François Maspero, 1966
- Poémes, chants, et chansons. Preface by Jules Vallès. Illustrated by Steinlen, Willette, Grün et al. Cœuvres-&-Valsery : Ressouvenances, 1997
- Poémes et chansons. Selected and edited by Jacques Gaucheron. Paris; Le Temps de cerises, 2016
- Beyond the Internationale: Revolutionary Writing by Eugène Pottier. Edited and translated by Loren Kruger. Chicago: Charles H. Kerr, 2024.
