= Pierre De Geyter =

Belgian socialist and composer (1848–1932)

Pierre Chrétien De Geyter
- Pierre Chrétien Degeyter
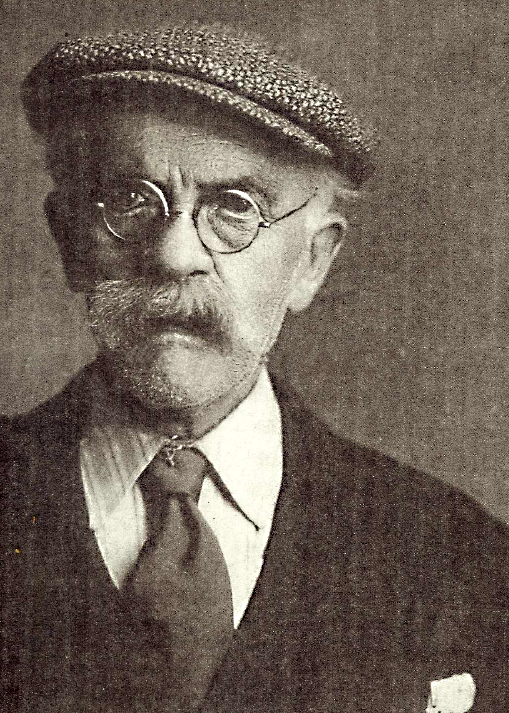
- Born: 8 October 1848; Ghent, Belgium
- Died: 26 September 1932 (aged 83); Saint-Denis, French Third Republic
- Writing career
- Language: French
- Movement: Socialism

Pierre Chrétien De Geyter (French: [pjɛʁ kʁetjɛ̃ də ɡetɛʁ]; Flemish: [də ˈɣɛitər]; 8 October 1848 – 26 September 1932) was a Belgian-French socialist and composer, best known for composing the music of "The Internationale" in Lille, in industrial northern France.

== Early life ==
De Geyter was born in Ghent, Belgium, where his parents, originally from the French Flanders, had moved to work in the textile factories. When he was seven, the family, who already counted five children, returned to France and settled in Lille. Pierre worked there as a thread maker and learned how to read and write at workers' evening classes. At age sixteen, he enrolled at the Lille Academy where he first took drawing classes, which allowed him to find a job as a woodcarver. He later took music classes, and joined the workers' choir "La Lyre des Travailleurs", founded by the socialist leader of Lille, Gustave Delory.

== The Internationale ==
"The Internationale" (instrumental)

On 15 July 1888, Delory contacted De Geyter to compose music for several "Chants révolutionnaires" that were often sung at popular events with Lille socialists. Among these was a song that was to become the International Workingmen's Association anthem, The Internationale. The lyrics had been written by Eugène Edine Pottier during the semaine sanglante (the "bloody week", May 22–28, 1871) marking the end and the severe repression of the Paris Commune of 1871. Until then, the song had usually been sung to the tune of the Marseillaise.

It took Pierre one Sunday morning to compose his music on a harmonium. According to one source, he then asked his brother Adolphe to play it on the bugle, and subsequently made some minor changes to the music. The new composition was first played by the Lyre des Travailleurs at the yearly fête of the Lille trade union of newspaper sellers in July 1888. Six thousand leaflets were printed at Pierre's favorite printing firm, Boldoduc, and sold to raise money for the socialist party in Lille. To protect his job, only "De Geyter" was named as the composer, but Pierre was dismissed regardless and was subsequently blacklisted by Lille employers. He was soon reduced to performing odd jobs, such as making coffins. In 1902, he left Lille with his wife and daughter and moved to Saint-Denis, near Paris.

In fact, Pierre De Geyter had neglected to secure copyright. As the song became ever more popular, his brother Adolphe De Geyter claimed copyright in 1901 and began to collect royalties on it. Pierre had become estranged from the socialist establishment of Lille by siding with the left-wing opponents of the Bloc National government of 1902 and with the Marxist war opponents influenced by Bolshevism who would later form the French Communist Party. In 1904, Pierre started court proceedings against Adolphe, but Gustave Delory (mayor of Lille by then) supported Adolphe's claim (though in an 1888 meeting with the Ghent socialist leader Edward Anseele he had identified Pierre Degeyter as the author) and, as a result, Pierre was unable to prove his authorship. He lost the case in 1914. At the beginning of 1916, however, during the First World War, Adolphe De Geyter hanged himself, leaving a note for his brother in which he acknowledged his fraud and asserted that he had been pressured by others to make the claim. Pierre, who was in unoccupied France at the time, received the letter only after the war. In 1922, the copyright verdict was reversed.

== Later life ==
In 1927, leaders of the Soviet Union discovered that the real author of The Internationale, which was then the Soviet Union's national anthem, was still alive. Pierre was invited to Moscow for the celebration of the 10th anniversary of the October Revolution and was in the stands of the honorary guests, with the German sculptor Käthe Kollwitz at his side. Joseph Stalin awarded him a Soviet Union state pension (according to some sources as a compensation for his copyright). As this was Pierre's only income, apart from modest fees collected on music for the other Pottier poems (particularly L'Insurgé and En avant la Classe Ouvrière) and on popular tunes he had also composed, and although the left-wing town administration of Saint-Denis granted him a free apartment, Pierre De Geyter spent the last years of his life in precarity. After his death at Saint-Denis in 1932, more than fifty thousand people attended his funeral.

== In popular culture ==
After his death, even in France, his name mainly came up during copyright litigation cases. French courts ruled his compositions, including The Internationale, copyrighted until October 2017.

There is a Pierre De Geyter street in Ghent and there are Pierre De Geyter squares both in Lille (in Fives, the suburb where he used to live) and in Saint-Denis. Lille also named a procession giant after him. In Sofia (Bulgaria) there is a street Пиер Дегейтър. A bronze monument to Pierre De Geyter has adorned the Ghent MIAT (Museum of Industry, Labour and Textiles) since 1998.

A documentary film on Pierre De Geyter and the story of The Internationale was produced in 1978.
