= Arkady Kots =

Russian poet and translator (1872–1943)

Arkady Yakovlevich Kots
- Аркадий Яковлевич Коц
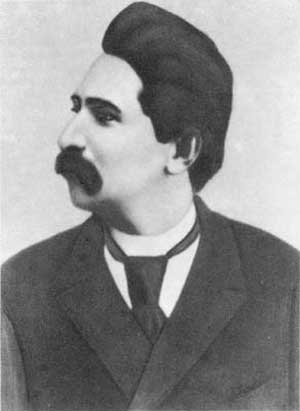
- Born: 15 October [O.S. 3 October] 1872; Odessa, Kherson province, Russian Empire
- Died: 13 May 1943 (age 70); Yekaterinburg, RSFSR, USSR
- Writing career
- Language: Russian

Arkady Yakovlevich Kots (Russian: Аркадий Яковлевич Коц; alias - A.Danin, A.Bronin, A.Shatov) (15 October [O.S. 3 October] 1872, in Odessa – 13 May 1943) was a Russian socialist, poet and translator of Jewish descent.

== Early life ==
Kots was born in 1872 in Odessa. In 1880 he witnessed the infamous Pogroms which left a great impression on him. He began to compose poetry at the age of 13. At the age of 15, Kots graduated from the six-year Odessa city school. He successfully passed the exams to continue his education but was not able to enroll due to restrictive quotas on Jewish enrollment.

Kots attended mining school in Horlivka from 1889-1893. Kots graduated in 1893 with the title of foreman and worked in his specialty at the Moscow and Donets Coal Basins. From 1894-1897, Kots worked in the Voznesensky and Petrovsky mines in the Yuzovka region.

In 1897-1902, Kots resided in Paris, where he graduated from a mining institute and established contact with the revolutionary emigres. In 1902, he graduated with the title of "Civil Mining Engineer."

== Works ==
Kots' Russian translation of The Internationale was used as the national anthem of the USSR from 1918 until 1944. It was originally published anonymously in a Russian emigre magazine Listki Zhizni, a companion publication to the Zhizn ("Life") magazine. His other significant contribution was The Proletarian Song (Песнь пролетариев).

In 1903, Arkady Kots joined the Russian Social Democratic Labour Party and carried out party assignments in Mariupol and Odessa. In 1907-1914, Kots did not belong to any political party. In 1907, a publishing house Nash Golos (Наш голос) published a collection of verses by Arkady Kots named Proletarian Songs (Песни пролетариев), which would be immediately confiscated by the tsarist authorities. Kots is known to have translated a play by Octave Mirbeau called Les Mauvais Bergers and published a number of political brochures. In 1914-1920, he sided with the Mensheviks.

During the Great Patriotic War, at the age of seventy, he went to work at a defense plant. He still devoted his free minutes to literary creativity and continued to translate poems by E. Potier into Russian. Kots died after being evacuated to the Far East in 1943.

Translation of "The Internationale"

Kots was presents at the 1899 Congress of French Socialist Organizations, where "The Internationale" was proclaimed the anthem of the socialists. As a young Russian emigre student, Kots studied at the Paris Mining Institute and participated in the revolutionary movement. Kots loved music and had led a choir of Russian emigrants for some time. The singing of "The Internationale" made a great impression on him, he recalled, “the voices of all those standing in the hall and in the choirs merged into one powerful rumble of voices that shook the walls of the hall. And when they reached the chorus and the last note of the words broke off, the enthusiasm and enthusiasm of the singers reached their limit. Overwhelmed by an indescribable feeling of unity, people in the hall and in the choirs hugged and kissed ..."

Kots' Russian translation of "The Internationale" was published in 1902 in London in the Marxist journal "Life (Zhizn')" under the pseudonym A. Danin. This translation was very successful due to its brevity, verse, clear rhythm, and forceful words. The name of Kots as translator remained unknown for some time, only in the 1930s was it formally credited to him.

The word "translation" is inadequate to describe Kots' contribution to creating the Russian version of Eugène Pottier's work. Kots chose three stanzas which he considered most suitable for the conditions in Russia and he reworked and adapted their content. His translation stands out for its creative independence.

Poetry

- Song of the Proletarians (Песень пролетариев) (1902)
- I Can Hear the Sound of His Speeches (Я слышу звук его речей)(Dedicated to Leo Tolstoy) (1902)
- May Song (Майская песнь) (1904)
- The 9th of January (9 января) (1905)
- Hymn to Liberty (Гимн свободе) (1905)
- Oath (Клятва) (1905)

== Personal life ==
Kots' oldest son Grigory Arkadyevich Kots won laureate of the USSR State Prize for developing technology for extracting Yakut diamonds from rocks and a laureate of the USSR Council of Ministers Prize for geological and technological mapping of solid mineral deposits.

His youngest son, Yuri Arkadyevich Kots died near Stalingrad during the Great Patriotic War.
