= Keputran =

- Administrative village
- Interactive map of Keputran
- Country: Indonesia
- Province: East Java
- Regency: Nganjuk
- District: Tegalsari
- Time zone: UTC+7

Keputran is an administrative village in the district of Tegalsari, Surabaya in East Java.
