= List of Women's International Democratic Federation people =

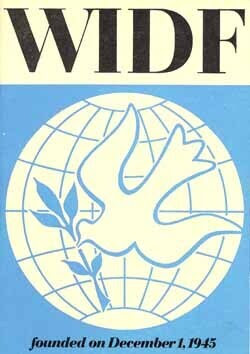

This is a list of people associated with the Women's International Democratic Federation, a women's rights organization established in 1945.

== Albania ==
- Liri Gega (1917–1956), communist activist, politician

== Algeria ==
- Abassia Fodil (1918-1962), Muslim member of the Union of Algerian Women, communist
- Baya Jurquet (1920-2007), elected to the WIDF Executive Council in 1953
- Alice Sportisse Gomez-Nadal (1909–1996), French-Algerian communist politician, WIDF council (1945)

== Argentina ==
- Fanny Edelman (1911–2011), communist politician, WIDF vice president (1975)
- Ana Rosa Schlieper de Martínez Guerrero (1888–1964), feminist leader, philanthropist, WIDF council (1945)
- Cora Ratto de Sadosky (1912–1981), mathematician, women's rights activist, anti-fascist politician

== Australia ==
- Freda Brown (1919–2009), political communist activist, feminist, WIDF president from 1974
- Jessie Street (1989–1970), diplomat, suffragist, founding member (1945)

== Austria ==
- Eva Priester (1910–1982), writer, communist, WIDF Korea commission (1951)

== Belgium ==
- Germaine Hannevart (1887–1977), pacifist, militant feminist, WIDF Korea commission (1951)

== Brazil ==
- Márcia Campos (fl. 1970s), academic, women's rights advocate, WIDF president (2002)
- Brianca Fialdho, WDIF vice president (1953)

== Bulgaria ==
- Tsola Dragoycheva (1898–1993), communist politician, founding member (1945)
- Rada Todorova (1902–1967), communist politician, founding member (1945)

== Canada ==
- Nora Rodd (1893–1994), peace activist, feminist, communist, Korea commission chair (1951)

== Chile ==
- Margot Duhalde (1920–2018), pilot, WIDF council (1945)
- Irma Salas Silva (1903–1987), educator, women's rights advocate, WIDF council (1945)

== China ==
- Cai Chang (1900–1990), politician, women's rights activist, WIDF vice president (1948), Korea commission vice chair (1951)
- Li Dequan (shown as Lee Teh Chu En or Li Teh Chuan, 1896–1972), WIDF Executive Council terms in 1948 and 1953.
- Liu Qingyang (1894–1977), communist activist, feminist
- Deng Yingchao (1904–1992), communist, WIDF council 1948 and 1953.
- He Xiangning (1878–1972), revolutionary, feminist, painter, WIDF council (1948)

== Croatia (Yugoslavia) ==
- Kata Pejnović (1899–1966), Croatian Serb feminist, politician, founding member (1945)

== Cuba ==
- Vilma Espín (1930–2007), revolutionary feminist, WIDF vice president (1975)
- Edith García Buchaca (1916-2015), communist leader, WIDF council (1953)
- Loló Soldevilla (1901–1971), visual artist, political activist, WIDF council (1945)

== Czechoslovakia/Czechia ==
- Anežka Hodinová-Spurná (1896–1063), Czech communist politician, WIDF council (1945)
- Milada Horáková (1901–1950), Czech socialist politician, women's rights advocate, WIDF council (1945)

== Denmark ==
- Ida Bachmann (1900–1995), librarian, feminist, active in USA, Korea commission vice chair (1951)
- Kate Fleron (1909–2006), editor, writer, resistance fighter, observer on WIDF Korea commission (1951)

== Egypt ==
- Inji Aflatoun (1924–1989), painter, Marxist activist, WIDF council (1945)
- Saiza Nabarawi (1897–1985), journalist, women's rights advocate, WIDF vice president (1953)

== El Salvador ==
- Lorena Peña (born 1955), economist, former guerilla, WDIF president (2016)

== Finland ==
- Sylvi-Kyllikki Kilpi (1899–1987), elected to the WIDF Executive Council in 1953
- Hertta Kuusinen (1904–1974), communist politician, WIDF president from 1967

== France ==
- Éliane Brault (1896–1982), resistance militant, political socialist, feminist, WIDF council (1948)
- Cécile Brunschvicg (1877–1948), feminist politician, founding member (1945)
- Eugénie Cotton (1881–1967), scientist, socialist, women's rights advocate, first WIDF president (1945)
- Marie-Claude Vaillant-Couturier (1912–1996), resistance member, photojournalist, communist politician, founding member (1945)
- Jeannette Vermeersch (1910–2001), communist politician, WIDF council (1945)

== East Germany ==
- Edith Baumann (1909-1973), East German politician, served on the WIDF Executive Council from 1953.
- Ilse Thiele (1920–2010), East German politician
- Lilly Wächter (1899–1989), socialist politician, women's rights activist, WIDF Korea commission (1951), WIDF vice president (1975)

== Greece ==
- Aleka Papariga (born 1945), communist politician
- Dido Sotiriou (1909–2004), writer, anti-fascist, WIDF council (1945)

== Hungary ==
- Erzsébet Metzker Vass (1915–1980), Speaker of the Hungarian Assembly, WIDF Executive Council member from 1951 to 1956.

== Iceland ==
- Laufey Valdimarsdóttir (1890–1945), women's rights activist, lawyer, WIDF council (1945)

== India ==
- Aruna Asaf Ali (1909–1996), educator, independence activist, publisher, WIDF vice president (1975)
- Pushpamayee Bose, WIDF vice-president (1955), president of the National Federation of India Women (1954)
- Renu Chakravartty, elected as WIDF Executive Council member in 1953.
- Vidya Munshi (1919–2014), communist politician, journalist, WIDF council (1945)
- Manikuntala Sen (c. 1911–1987), communist politician. WIDF council (1948)
- Irma Salas Silva (c. 1911–1987), communist activist

== Indonesia ==
- Umi Sardjono (1923–2011), anti-fascist women's rights activist, WIDF executive board member

== Iran ==
- Shahnaz Alami, promoted WIDF's idea for International Women's Year to the United Nations Commission on the Status of Women in 1972.
- Jamileh Sadighi (جمیله صدیقی, 1903-1983), elected to the WIDF Executive Council in 1953.

== Italy ==
- Gisella Floreanini (1906–1992), teacher, anti-fascist activist, politician, WIDF council (1945)
- Elena Gatti Caporaso (1918–1999), socialist politician, feminist, WIDF council (1948)
- Ada Gobetti (1902–1968), journalist, anti-fascist, WIDS council (1945)
- Angiola Minella (1920–1988), communist politician, WIDF secretary general (1955)
- Rita Montagnana (1895–1979), communist politician
- Teresa Noce (1900–1980), union leader, journalist, feminist, WIDF council (1948)
- Camilla Ravera (1889–1988), communist politician, feminist, WIDF council (1945)
- Maria Maddalena Rossi (1906–1996), anti-fascist communist politician, journalist, WIDF vice president (1955)

== Japan ==
- Hiratsuka Raichō (1886–1971), WIDF vice president (1955)
- Fuki Kushida (1899–2001), peace and women's rights activist, WIDF vice president (1975)

== Luxembourg ==
- Yvonne Useldinger (1921–2009), communist politician, WIDF council (1945)

== Mongolia ==
- Sonomyn Udval (1921–1991), elected to the WIDF Executive Council in 1953.
- Sükhbaataryn Yanjmaa (1893–1962), revolutionary politician

== Morocco ==
- Lucette Mazzella (1910–1987), teacher, delegate to WIDF founding conference in 1945

== Netherlands ==
- Trees Sunito Heyligers (1915–2003), lawyer, translator, WIDF Korea commission (1951)

== Nigeria ==
- Funmilayo Ransome-Kuti (1900–1978), educator. political campaigner, women's rights activist, WDIF vice president (1955)

== North Korea ==
- Pak Chong-ae (born 1907), communist politician, WIDF council (1948)

== Norway ==
- Kirsten Hansteen (1903–1974), editor, librarian, communist politician, WIDF council (1945)
- Mimi Sverdrup Lunden (1894–1955), writer, women's rights advocate, WIDF council (1948)

== Poland ==
- Regina Fleszarowa (1888–1969), geographer, women's rights activist, WIDF council (1945)
- Eugenia Pragierowa (1888–1964), socialist activist, feminist, politician, WIDF council (1945)

== Portugal ==
- Maria Luísa Costa Dias (1916–1976), physician, communist activist
- Maria Alda Nogueira (1923–1988), communist, feminist activist, WIDF council (1945)

== Romania ==
- Constanța Crăciun (1814–2002), communist politician, educator, WIDF council (1948)
- Ana Pauker (1893–1960), communist politician, founding member (1945)

== Soviet Union ==
- Nina Vasilyevna Popova (1908–1994), Soviet politician, women's rights advocate, chaired Soviet Women's Committee, founding member (1945)
- Valentina Tereshkova (born 1937), cosmonaut, communist politician, WIDF vice president (1975)

== Yugoslavia ==
- Mitra Mitrović (1912–2001), politician, feminist, writer, WIDF council (1945)

== South Africa ==
- Kate Molale (1928–1980), political activist, women's rights advocate
- Florence Mophosho (1921–1985), anti-apartheid activist, feminist
- Lillian Ngoyi (1911–1980), anti-apartheid activist, unionist

== Spain ==
- Teresa Andrés Zamora (1907–1946), communist militant, feminist, WIDF council (1945)
- Dolores Ibárruri (1895–1989), republican politician, communist, founding member (1945)
- Veneranda Manzano (1893–1992), republic political activist, WIDF council (1945)

== Sudan ==
- Fatima Ahmed Ibrahim (1930–2017), writer, women's rights activist, socialist leader, WIDF president (1991)

== Sweden ==
- Andrea Andreen (1888–1972), physician, pacifist, feminist, WIDF Council (1945)
- Valborg Svensson (1903–1983), communist politician, journalist, WIDF Council (1948, 1956)
- Elisabeth Tamm (1880-1958), politician, elected to the WIDF Executive Council in 1953

== United Kingdom ==
- Elizabeth Acland Allen (1901–1969), civil rights advocate, founding member of WIDF
- Monica Felton (1906–1970), writer, feminist, social activist, WIDF Korea commission (1951)

== United States ==
- Tsola Dragoycheva (1886–1952), writer, artist, social activist
- Muriel Draper (1886–1952), writer, artist, social activist, WIDF council (1945)
- Florence Eldridge (1901–1988), actress, WIDF council (1945)
- Elizabeth Gurley Flynn (1890–1964), union leader, women's rights activist, feminist, WIDF council (1945)
- Vivian Carter Mason (1890–1982), women's rights advocate, WIDF council (1945)
- Betty Millard (1911–2010), artist, political activist, feminist
- Thelma Dale Perkins (1915–2014), African-American activist
- Gene Weltfish (1902–1980), anthropologist, social activist, WIDF council (1945)

== Uruguay ==
- Julia Arévalo de Roche (1898–1985), politician, WIDF council (1945)
