= Women's International Democratic Federation =

International women's rights organization

Women International Democratic Federation
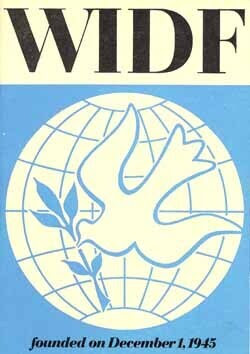
- Original WIDF logo from its founding
- Abbreviation: WIDF
- Formation: December 1945
- Type: NGO
- Purpose: Association of World's Women Organizations
- Headquarters: San Salvador, El Salvador
- Location(s): 23 Calle Poniente & Avenida Las Victorias #123, Urbanización Palomo, San Salvador
- Region served: Worldwide
- Official language: English, French, Russian, Spanish, Arabic, German, Portuguese

The Women's International Democratic Federation (WIDF) is an international women's rights organization. Established in 1945, it was most active during the Cold War when, according to historian Francisca de Haan, it was "the largest and probably most influential international women's organization of the post-1945 era". Following the dissolution of the Soviet Union in 1991, its headquarters were moved from Berlin to Paris. In 2002, after Márcia Campos was elected president, the office relocated to Brasília. Subsequently, in 2007 the WIDF secretariat was located in São Paulo. Since 2016, the president has been Lorena Peña of El Salvador and the world headquarters has been located in San Salvador. The WIDF's magazine, Women of the Whole World, was published in six languages: Arabic, English, French, German, Russian, and Spanish.

WIDF was founded in Paris in 1945 with the intent of engaging women in efforts to prevent war and to combat the racism and sexism in fascist states. At its organizing conference, Eugénie Cotton was elected as president and the organization's goals were defined as promoting active participation in the fight against fascism and in favor of world peace, in protecting public health with particular focus on child welfare, in improving the status of women's rights, and in building internationalist friendships among women.

During the Cold War era, WIDF was described in recovered FBI files as Communist-leaning and pro-Soviet. The international day for protection of children, observed since 1950 in many countries as Children's Day on 1 June, was established on the initiative of a WIDF campaign held in 1949. In 1951, the organization was banned by French authorities and relocated to East Berlin. Other international women's organizations became concerned that WIDF would use appeals to rally participation in women's rights and motherhood as propaganda to increase anti-American sentiment and promote communism. At various points in its history, the WIDF enjoyed consultative status with the Economic and Social Council (ECOSOC) of the United Nations. It was as a result of proposals from WIDF representatives on the Commission on the Status of Women (CSW) that the United Nations declared 1975 as International Women's Year.

== History ==
=== Background ===
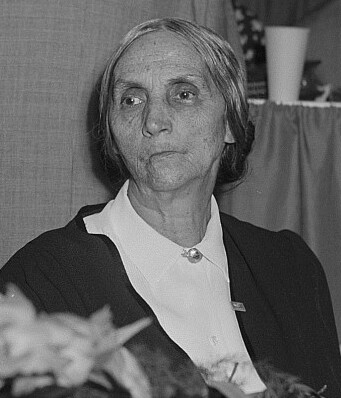
Eugénie Cotton, 1952

From the beginnings of World War II left-leaning women who were communist, liberal, or socialist were active in the fight against fascism and the spread of the racist and sexist ideology of Nazism. During the war, many of the activists, who were primarily aristocrats and intellectuals, took part in anti-fascist conferences throughout Europe, and began to develop a transnational framework for social and political policies that would prevent future conflicts. Eugénie Cotton attended a meeting of the Union des Femmes Françaises (Union of French Women) in 1944, which sparked the idea for forming the Women International Democratic Federation. Subsequently, she attended a celebration of International Women's Day in London in 1945 where she met with a group of women from Belgium, China, France, Italy, the Soviet Union, Spain, the United Kingdom, and Yugoslavia. Although the war had ended only six months earlier in Europe and was still continuing in Asia, consensus was reached to form an International Initiative Committee and host an international congress to bring left-leaning women together. Sponsors of the event were the Union des Femmes Françaises and the Soviet Women's Anti-Fascist Committee. WIDF's internal sources about its origin are vague in regard to the political affiliations of the founders, focusing instead on their involvement in resistance and anti-fascist movements during and immediately following the war, and their intent to establish an organization which was open to all progressive women.

=== Founding of the WIDF ===
The congress was held between 26 and 30 November 1945 at the Palais de la Mutualité in Paris. As a result, 850 delegates from 40 countries, representing 181 women's organizations, attended the founding meeting of the Women's International Democratic Federation. Cotton was elected president of WIDF and served in that capacity until her death in 1967. The organizational goals were defined as promoting active participation in the fight against fascism and in favor of world peace, in protecting public health with particular focus on child welfare, in improving the status of women's rights, and in building internationalist friendships among women. The delegates adopted an International Charter of Women, which aimed at creating global standards protecting women's rights and opportunities as citizens, mothers, and workers. They also had numerous debates about the voting system to be used; the naming of the organization, replacing the original wording using "anti-fascist" with "democratic"; and whether WIDF would have any authority to control member organizations.

The delegates ultimately decided to host triennial congresses with votes on issues based on the size of the population that each national delegation represented. The executive council, made up of a delegate from each member country, was to meet every year. The secretariat was composed of a secretary general and four staff members, who would carry out the management of the federation's business, with the exception of bookkeeping, which was assigned to a three-member commission. Among the founding members were Elizabeth Acland Allen (UK), Cécile Brunschvicg (France), Tsola Dragoycheva (Bulgaria), Dolores Ibárruri (Spain), Ana Pauker (Romania), Kata Pejnović (Yugoslavia), Nina Popova (Russia), Rada Todorova (Bulgaria); Jessie Street (Australia), and Marie-Claude Vaillant-Couturier (France), (Note: Council Members in 1945 included: Ela Gjikondi (named as Ela Jikondi) and Liri Gega (named as Gega Liri) (Albania); Maryvonne Hamon, Fatma Merani (named as Fathma Merani), Jeanne Merens, and Alice Sportisse (Algeria); Ana Rosa de Martinez Guerrero and Cora Ratto de Sadosky (Argentina), Anna Grün and Maria Köstler (named as Maria Koestler) (Austria); Lucienne Lesaint (named as Mme Lesaint) and Bertha Pieterbourg (named as Mme Pieterbourg) (Belgium); Tsola Dragoycheva (named as Tzola Dragoitcheva), Zvetana Kartcheva, Theodra Krestanova, and Todora Obova (Bulgaria); Margot Duhalde and Irma Salas (Chile); Li Pei (named as Lee Pei) and Lu Jiang Shuhuan (named as Lu Chiang Shu Huan) (China), Nila Ortega Casimiro and Dolores Soldevila (Cuba), Míla Grimmichová, Anežka Hodinová (named as Anecka Hodinova), Milada Horáková, Hana Josková, and Marie Trojanová (Czechoslovakia); Inji Efflatoun, Safeya Fadel, Soad Kamel, and Mlle Souraya (Egypt); Anna Nevalainen (Finland); Cécile Brunschvicg, Eugénie Cotton, Marie Couette, Françoise Leclercq, Marie-Claude Vaillant-Couturier, and Jeannette Vermeersch (France); Elli Danos, Chryssa Roussos, Fani Simitis (named as Fanny Simitis), and Dido Sotiriou (Greece); Mrs. Boris Fai (named as Borie Fai), Yolande Maylat, Mrs. Boriska Szeremy, and Erzsébet Tildy (named as Elisabeth Tildy) (Hungary); Laufey Valdimarsdottir (Iceland); Roshan Barber, Jai Kishori Handoo, Vidya Kanuga, and Ela Reid (named as Ela Reed) (India); Lucia Corti, Ione Cortini, Gisella Floreanini, Ada Gobetti, Camilla Ravera, and Maria Romita (Italy); Fernande Marx (named as Mme Marx) and Yvonne Useldinger (named as Mme Useldinger) (Luxembourg); Lucette Mazzella (named as Lucette Mazella) (Morocco); Kirsten Hansteen (Norway); Irena Andrzejewska (named as Iréne Andrejewska), Regina Fleszarowa (named as Mme Fleszar), Mme Garnearzykowa, Eugenia Pragierowa (named as Mme Pragier), Stanisława Dłuska (named as Dluska Stanislava), and Irena Sztachelska (named as Iréne Sztachelska) (Poland); Maria Barbosa Nogueira (named as Maria Barbosa), Maria Emília Baptista Ferreira (named as Maria Ferreira), Gloria Martin, and Belmira Rodrigues Tiago (named as Belmira Tiago) (Portugal); Elena Livezeanu (named as Elena Livezeano), Medea Nicolescu (named as Medea Nicolesco), Ana Pauker, Eugenia Rădăceanu (named as Eugenia Radaceano) (Romania); Téresa Andres, Dolores Ibárruri, Veneranda Manzano (Spain); Andrea Andreen (Sweden); Charlotte Muret (Switzerland); Julia Arevalo de Roche and Dra. Labrucherie de Bacigalupe (Uruguay); Muriel Draper, Ann Bradford, Elisabeth G. Flynn, Florence Eldridge (named as Mrs. Frederick March), Vivian C. Mason, and Gene Weltfish (US); Larisa Alexandrovskaya (written as Larissa Alexandrowskaia), Julia Beliaeva, Tatiana Fedorova, Zinaida Gagarina, Tatiana Kosheleva (named as Tatiana Kocheleva), Maria Pidtychenko (named as Maria Pidtichenko), Nina Popova, Catherine Tulenieva (USSR); and Nada Bručić (named as Nada Brutchich), Olga Milošević (named as Olga Milochevitch), Mitra Mitrović (named as Mitra Mitrovitch), and Vida Torušić (named as Vida Toruchitch) (Yugoslavia).(Cotton (1946) pp. 403–407)) Among the women sending congratulations and support for the founding of WDIF were Clementine Churchill, wife of the British Prime Minister; Eleanor Roosevelt, First Lady of the United States, and Isie Smuts, wife of the Prime Minister of the Union of South Africa. Gabrielle Duchêne, a vice president of the Women's International League for Peace and Freedom (WILPF), and Margery Corbett Ashby, president of the International Alliance of Women, attended the congress. Ashby later wrote to her husband that failure to organize women in the Near East would result in the communist women's dominance there.

=== Rivalry with other international organizations ===
After the founding of the WIDF, an intense rivalry developed between the three major international women's groups – the International Alliance of Women, the International Council of Women, and the WIDF. Both the International Alliance of Women and the International Council of Women claimed to be apolitical, but according to historian Francisca de Haan, the leading scholar on the WIDF, they "used imperialist notions of western superiority to support their claims for women's rights". Both organizations condoned colonial and imperial systems and stressed the importance of democracy in achieving fundamental human rights such as freedom of conscience, press, and speech. Their members were typically conservative, upper-class, Christian women from Europe, or places such as Australia, Canada, and the United States, where large numbers of Europeans had settled. After World War I, the International Council of Women and International Alliance of Women actively recruited affiliates in Latin America, the Middle East, Asia, and Africa, but the leadership tended to be from Europe and the United States, the congresses were held primarily in Europe, and the official languages of the groups were English, French, and German.

To resolve women's issues, the International Alliance of Women and the International Council of Women fostered interaction with ruling elites. For example, the International Council of Women and the WILPF, created in 1915 by members of the International Alliance of Women and other elite women's groups, approached peace activism by urging heads of nations towards pacifism and avoidance of war through diplomatic channels and improved understanding of cultural differences. Fears of red-baiting prevented Western organizations like the WILPF from criticizing colonial systems and exploitation until the 1960s. Publications such as International Alliance of Women member Adele Schreiber-Krieger's Journey towards Freedom (1955) emphasized the role of western women in assisting women from the "third world" in eliminating prevalent customs like child marriage, foot binding, seclusion, veiling, and widow sacrifice, without evaluating how western systems impacted colonized women or crediting women of the Global South or the Eastern world for their own efforts in asserting their agency.

WIDF regarded peace as a prerequisite for fighting against fascism and obtaining rights for women and children. Unlike the pacifist western feminist groups, WIDF members did not see peace as the avoidance or absence of war; rather, they viewed it as the achievement of social justice and the cessation of oppression and exploitation. The organization strongly supported decolonization and national independence movements, and was active in the anti-war movement pushing for peace in Africa and Asia. WIDF organized its activities directly with its women members, bypassing government officials. It was typical for the organization to send letters to members urging action and protest over government policies. For example, the organization rallied Frenchwomen to have their sons refuse to participate in colonial wars, and urged American women to protest the use of germ warfare in Korea. Between its congresses, WIDF also organized large conferences to address peace, motherhood, and women's issues.

WIDF's membership and leadership included women from throughout the world. Although primarily held in Europe, its conferences were also held in Asia, and Latin America. It was an explicitly anti-racist organization, whose members were working-class. For example, at its founding, the WIDF board established a vice presidency post for a Chinese delegate, which was filled by Cai Chang (Note: Cai Chang: In documents of the WIDF, Cai's name typically appears as Tsai Tchang, or Tsai Chang in Asian name order.(de Haan (2012a) p. 11) (Joliot-Curie (1949) pp. 553–555)) in 1948. The executive council that year consisted of members from Algeria, Argentina, Bulgaria, Czechoslovakia, China, Finland, France, Greece, Hungary, India, Italy, Korea, Norway, Poland, Romania, Spain, Sweden, Switzerland, United States, USSR, and Yugoslavia. (Note: Council Members in 1948 included: Alice Sportisse (Algeria); Fanny Edelman and Margarita de Ponce (named as Margarita Ponce) (Argentina); Tsola Dragoycheva (named as Tzola Dragaitcheva) and Vera Natcheva (Bulgaria); Anežka Hodinová (named as Anezka Hodinova) and Lenka Lehká (named as Lenka Lehka) (Czechoslovakia); He Xiangning (named as Ho Shiang Ming), Li Dequan (named as Lee Teh Chu En), Lu Tsui, Deng Yingchao (named as Teng Ying-Chao), Cai Chang (named as Tsai Chang) (China); Helvi Laine and Anna Nevolainen (Finland); Éliane Brault, Eugénie Cotton, Marie Couette, Françoise Leclercq, Marie-Claude Vaillant-Couturier, Jeanette Vermeersh (France); Roula Koukoulou and Evdokia "Vera" Nikolovska-Foteva (named as Vera Nicolefska) (Greece); Magda Jóború and Boris Fai (Hungary); Sarah Abraham and Manikuntala Sen (India); Elena Caporazo, Rosa Fazio Longo, Teresa Noce, and Maddalina Rossi (Italy); Den Ai Pak and Yu Yen-Dun (Korea); Mimi Sverdrup Lunden (Norway); Izolda Kowalska, Edwarda Orłowska, Eugenia Pragierowa (named as Eugenie Pragierova), Irena Sztachelska (Poland); Constanța Crăciun (named as Constantza Craciun) and Florina Mezincescu (named as Florida Mezincescu) (Romania); Dolores Ibárruri and Elisa Úriz (Spain); Andrea Andreen and Valborg Svensson (Sweden); Claire Bächlin and Charlotte Muret (Switzerland); Muriel Draper, Helen Phillips, Frances Smith, Jeannette Turner, Agnes Vukcevich, and Gene Weltfish (United States); Zinaida Gagarina, Zinaida Gourina, Lidia Petrova Kornelenko, Nadezhda Parfenova (named as Nadiejda Parfenova), and Nina Popova (USSR); and Olga Milošević (named as Olga Milochevitch), Mitra Mitrović (named as Mitra Mitrovitch) (Yugoslavia).(Joliot-Curie (1949) pp. 553–555)) Egyptian feminist Saiza Nabarawi, who was a vice president of the International Alliance of Women, attended WIDF's 1952 Vienna Congress and was asked by the board of the IAW to choose which organization she preferred. She resigned from the International Alliance of Women's board and became a vice president of WIDF in 1953. WIDF's monthly magazine, which became a quarterly publication in 1966, Women of the Whole World, was produced in six languages – Arabic, English, French, German, Russian, and Spanish from 1946 to 1990.

=== Early activism (1945–1950) ===
The US affiliate of the WIDF, the Congress of American Women formed in 1946, along the lines of the popular front. Although the Congress of American Women declared itself to be independent of political alliance, the Communist Party publicly endorsed the organization upon its founding. That same year, the Kongres Wanita Indonesia (Indonesian Women's Congress, Kowani) formed and joined the WIDF because of its support for decolonization. WIDF members participated in a fact-finding mission in 1946 through Latin America, visiting Argentina, Brazil, Chile, and Uruguay, to build networks and learn about the issues women faced there. They collected reports from women in India and Algeria to evaluate how the lack of development programs led to poverty and how economic policies and customs systemically exploited agricultural workers. In 1947, WIDF was granted consultative status category B for the United Nations Economic and Social Council (ECOSOC) and its Commission on the Status of Women (CSW). To assess the conditions of women living under British colonial rule in Asia in 1948 another WIDF delegation toured British Burma, British Malaya, and the Dominion of India. A similar trip, which was scheduled to evaluate the Dutch East Indies and French Indochina, had to be canceled because Dutch and French authorities refused to grant visas to the WIDF members.

The observers compiled their report The Women of Asia and Africa, in preparation for a conference planned for 1948 to be held in Calcutta (now Kolkata), in honor of India's independence from the United Kingdom. The report detailed the need to reach out to rural women, whether they were peasants, owned land, or were refugees; and to confront gendered policies that created inadequate health care, food, and wages for women or subjected them to trafficking and cultural practices that impeded their safety and security. It also focused on informing activists in the West about the issues associated with imperialism, under-development and the violence colonial wars caused for other women.

Immediately following India's independence, its Prime Minister Jawaharlal Nehru began implementing policies to silence dissent, imprisoning or driving activists and communists underground. Neither land reforms to protect peasants and rural women nor changes to hiring and wage systems to produce job and income stability were implemented. WIDF activists recognized that there was no difference between the struggle against colonial administrations or newly created governments, meaning that their demands for a realignment of power hierarchies to include working- and middle-class women would not be supported. To that end, the conference was rescheduled to be held in 1949 in Peiking (now Beijing). It was the first anti-imperialist and pan-Asian (Note: Asian: In the immediate period after the war, and with the creation of Israel and its impact on Palestine, the Middle East and North Africa region was considered Asian and the pan-Arab women's movement was treated as part of the Asian women's network.(Armstrong (2016) p. 306)) women's conference bringing together women from Africa and Asia. That year, WIDF also led a campaign to establish Children's Day, an international day dedicated to protection of children, as an annual observance on 1 June. (Note: Childrens day: Journalist Susan Cooke and other sources have indicated that the date was established at a WIDF Congress held in Moscow in 1949.(Cook:2015) According to de Haan, the second congress of WIDF occurred in Budapest in 1948 and the third congress was hosted in Copenhagen in 1953.(de Haan:2012a p.16) A conference was held in Beijing in 1949,(Armstrong:2023 p. 60) and the WIDF council held a meeting in Moscow in 1949.(WIDF:1949) De Haan confirms WIDF's efforts took place in 1949 citing a 40th anniversary publication(de Haan (2012a) pp. 14, 17) and WIDF documents as early as their 10th anniversary publication in 1955 confirmed the initiative.(WIDF (1955) p. 33))

The United States had not endorsed a policy of containing communism until after the communists came to power in 1949 at the end of the Chinese Civil War. US focus was on Europe, and specifically the Soviet actions in Berlin. Thoughts by both superpowers that China would become a Soviet ally caused the cold war to heat up. The Congress of American Women was targeted by the Committee on Un-American Activities of the United States House of Representatives (HUAC) in 1949 due to the support it had been given by the Communist Party. The committee described WIDF as being a communist front using feminism as a guise to lure women to join the organization and concluded that the organization was a wing of Soviet propaganda mechanisms which used a peace campaign to promote disarmament and foster the communist take-over of democratic nations. The Indonesian group Kowani withdrew from WIDF in 1949 because of objections by some of its affiliates to the organization's ties to socialism, but the following year, another Indonesian organization, Gerwis (later renamed Gerwani), affiliated with WIDF. The Congress of American Women disbanded in 1950 because of the negative reactions to the HUAC report.

=== Cold War changes (1951–1990) ===
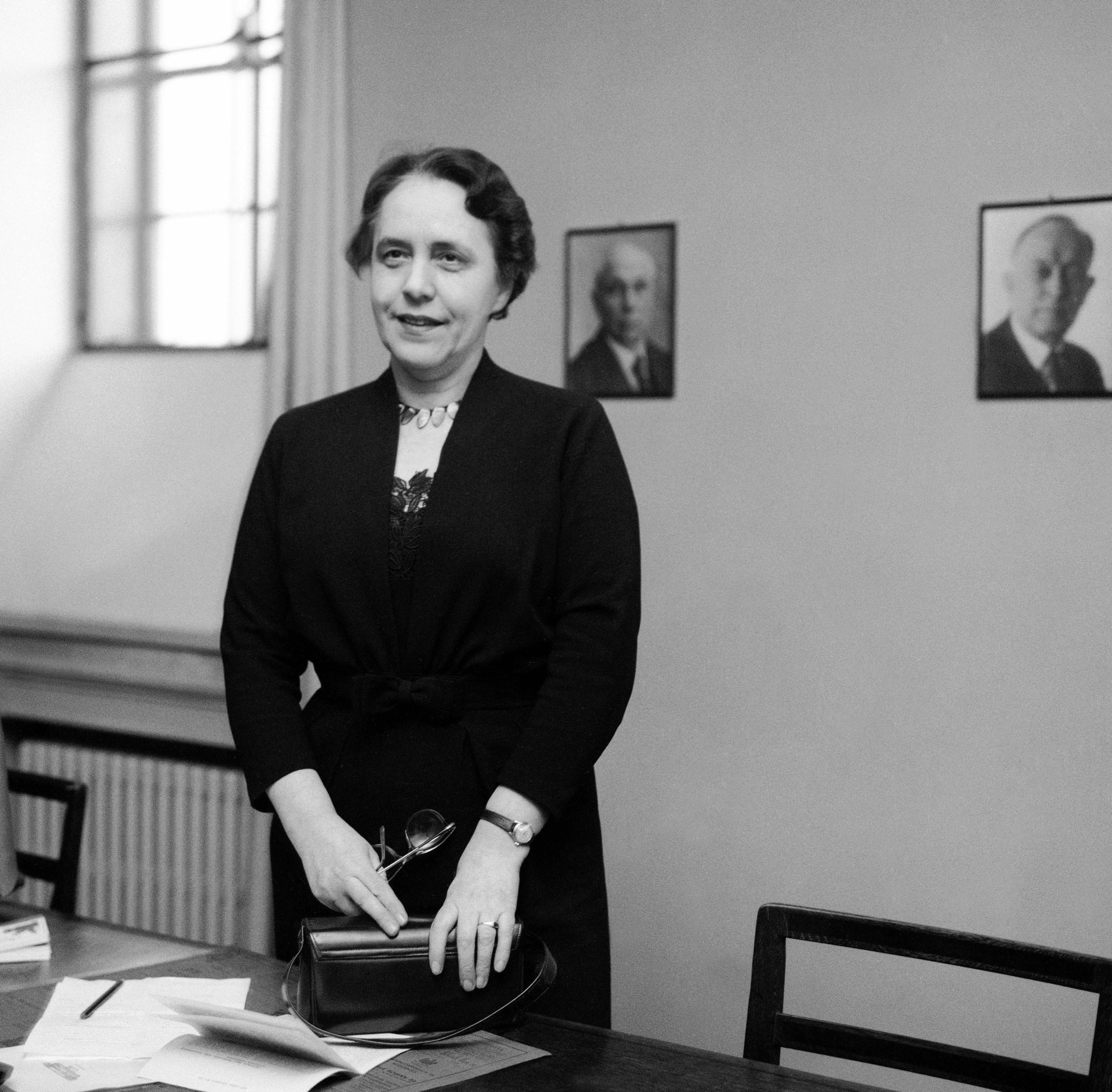
Hertta Kuusinen, 1958

Twenty-one WIDF activists from Africa, the Americas, Asia, and Europe spent twelve days evaluating the conditions on the Korean peninsula during the war in May 1951,. The investigation was focused on North Korea and attempted to objectively evaluate government claims of civilian casualties. Among the delegates were Nora Rodd (chair, Canada), Liu Qingyang (vice chair, China), (Note: Liu Qingyang: At the time sources spelled the name as Liu Chin-yan or Liu Ching Yang, using Asian name order.WIDF Korea Commission (1951) p. 46) (New China News Agency (1963) p. BBB1)) Ida Bachmann (vice chair, Denmark), Trees Sunito Heyligers (secretary, Netherlands), Abassia Fodil (Algeria), Monica Felton (Britain), Kate Fleron (Denmark), Candelaria Rodríguez (Cuba), Hilde Cahn (East Germany), Eva Priester (Austria), and Lilly Wächter (West Germany), among others. (Note: Evaluating Korea: twelve members were from Europe, representing Austria, Belgium, Britain, Czechoslovakia, Denmark (2 delegates), East Germany, France, Italy, the Netherlands, the USSR, and West Germany; four delegates came from Asia, on behalf of the People's Republic of China (3 delegates) and Vietnam; three delegates were from the Americas, representing Argentina, Canada, and Cuba; and two delegates came from Africa, acting for Algeria and Tunisia.(Kim (2020) p. 88) Only six were from communist countries and the group included women with liberal and conservative political views, as well as differing ages, religions, and cultural and social backgrounds.(Kim (2020) pp. 88–89)) They wrote a report, We Accuse, which was translated into Chinese, Korean, English, German, and Spanish, and described the bombing raids carried out by the United States Air Force and war crimes committed by the United Nations Forces. WIDF's report caused apprehension on the part of the US government about public opinion of its Korean activities, and specific concern within the United States Department of State and the United States Women's Bureau about accusations of germ warfare, which were picked up and investigated by the International Association of Democratic Lawyers. The US government sought to red-bait the authors, and the CIA covertly funded the Committee of Correspondence to work against WIDF.

Women United for United Nations, a group of 30 women's organizations established in 1947 to disseminate information about the activities of the UN, prepared a critique of the WIDF report, which the Department of State widely disseminated through Radio Free Asia and Radio Free Europe. Women United also sent their report to women's organizations and major newspapers like The New York Times and The Washington Post. Delegation members thereafter faced arrest and interrogation for treason upon returning home. Several of the WIDF delegates were terminated from their workplaces and imprisoned, but none waivered in their belief that the report was factual. Rodríguez and another Cuban WIDF activist, Edith García Buchaca, led a campaign advocating prevention of Cuban troops from participating in the war and were successful in changing public opinion, which had previously favored Cuban participation. The United States, with support from Britain, led a successful crusade in 1954 to strip WIDF of its consultative status for the United Nations, largely because of its anti-colonial work and exposé on Korea.

French authorities banned WIDF in 1951 after its activists launched a campaign against French aggression in Vietnam and urged French women to refuse to allow their sons to participate in the war. The organization relocated to East Berlin where it began to strengthen its ties to the Soviet Union. Held in 1953 in Copenhagen, the third congress attracted 613 delegates from 67 countries. Among the nearly 2,000 attendants were over 1,300 guests and observers. (Note: Executive Council Members in 1953 included: Baya Allaouchiche and Abassia Fodil (Algeria), Fanny Edelman and Margarita de Ponce (Argentina); Branca Fialho and Arcelina Mochel Goto (Brazil); Monica Felton (Britain); Tzola Dragoitcheva and Vera Natcheva (Bulgaria); Li Dequan (named as Li Teh Chuan), Lu Tsui, Cai Chang (named as Tsai Chang), Tsao Meng Chuan, Deng Yingchao (named as Teng Ying Chao), and Yang Yun-Yu (China); Edith García Buchaca and Candelaria Rodríguez (Cuba); Irena Ďurišová (named as Irena Durisova) and Anežka Hodinová-Spurná (Czechoslovakia); Ruth Hermann and Alvilda Larsen (Denmark); Saiza Nabarawi (named as Ceza Nabaraoui) (Egypt); Sylvi-Kyllikki Kilpi (named as Silvi Killikki Kilpi) and Irma Torvi (Finland); Eugénie Cotton, Juliette Dubois, Gisèle Joannès, Françoise Leclercq, Andrée Marty-Capgras, and Marie-Claude Vaillant-Couturier (France); Edith Baumann, Helga Dickel, Ilse Thiele, Marie Tauberth (named as Marie Taubert), Lilly Wächter (Germany); Roza Imvrioti (named as Rosa Imvrioti) and Roula Koukoulou (Greece); Erzsébet Andics, Edith Erdei, and Erzsébet Metzker Vass (named as Elizabeth Vass) (Hungary); Renu Chakravartty and Bibi Sakuntala (India); Maryam Firouz (named as Miriam Firouz) and Jamileh Sadighi (named as Djamile Sadighi) (Iran); Ada Alessandrini, Elena Caporaso, Rosa Fazio Longo (named as Rosetta Longo), Rita Montagnana, Angiola Minella, Teresa Noce, and Maria Maddelena Rossi (Italy); Lemach Norcine and Sonomyn Udval (named as Udval Sonomen) (Mongolia); Ransome Kuti (Nigeria); Gudrun Eivindson and Sigrid Nærup Gunderud (named as Sigrid Narup Gunderud) (Norway); Wanda Jakubowska (named as Vanda Jakubovska), Jatazkuvna Mehalina, Alicja Musiałowa-Afanasjew (named as Alicia Musialova), and Eugenia Pragierowa (named as Eugenie Praguierova) (Poland); Stella Enescu and Dida Mihalcea (Romania); Dolores Ibárruri and Elisa Úriz (Spain); Andrea Andreen and Elisabeth Tamm (Sweden); Lotte Hümbelin and Charlotte Muret (Switzerland); Zinaida Gagarina, Galina Gorochkova, Nadezhda Parfenova (named as Nadejda Parfienova), Lidia Petrova, and Nina Popova (USSR); and Vera Luitch and Bosiljka Marijanović (named as Bosilka Marianovitch) (Yugoslavia).(WIDF (1953) pp. 264-265)) The Indonesian delegation, led by Soerastri Karma Trimurti and a number of other members of Gerwani, included women from the Minahasa Women's Union, Wanita Democrat (Democratic Women) and Wanita Rakyat (Women of the People) organizations. The focus of the congress was fostering peace in light of on-going conflicts like the Korean War and the war to end French rule in Vietnam. Resolutions were adopted at the congress to support an immediate end to both wars and to publish a Declaration on the Rights of Women. The declaration included provisions for the right to work, maternity leave, and equal pay for women; creation of child care and kindergarten centers for working women; protection of the civil and educational rights of women and children; support for women's suffrage and the right to political representation; equal rights with men in owning property and protecting peasant women's land ownership; and the right for women to freely associate and participate in organizations.

Throughout the following decades, WIDF continued to host world-wide conferences, including the 1952 Conference in Defense of Children held in Vienna, the 1955 World Congress of Mothers hosted in Lausanne, 1959 Women of Latin America Conference held in Santiago, Chile, the 1960 Copenhagen celebration of WIDF's 50th anniversary, and the 1961 Afro-Asian Women's Conference of Cairo. The organization published documents, such as Pour la defense des droits de la personne humaine (For the Defense of Human Rights), to reiterate their position that human rights included women's rights. The WIDF would not be readmitted as a consultant body to the United Nations until 1967, when newly independent former colonies pressed for a restoration of its status. In 1969, US-USSR relations entered a period of détente, and that year, WIDF was elevated to Consultative Status A. The improvement in relationships, between the United States, USSR, and resumption of US relations with China in 1972, allowed nations in the Global South, which had become the majority of members of the United Nations, to assert their power and oppose policies of the superpowers, leading to a broader focus on women's issues by the organization.

At the WIDF council meeting in East Berlin in 1971, preliminary discussions took place about hosting a year for women. The Committee of the Bulgarian Women's Movement hosted the WIDF council meeting in Sofia in 1972 and first proposed the idea of a UN-sponsored international women's conference for 1975. WIDF activists Shahnaz Alami (Iran) and Hertta Kuusinen (Finland) promoted the idea within the Commission on the Status of Women. WIDF members of the Magyar Nők Országos Tanácsa (National Council of Hungarian Women) and Consiliu Național al Femeilor Române (National Council of Romanian Women) promoted the idea in Women of the Whole World. When the WIDF raised the suggestion for International Women's Year to the Commission on the Status of Women, it did not gain traction because of WIDF's observer status. Undeterred, the WIDF drafted a proposal, which was presented to the commission by Romanian official representative Florica Andrei, a member of the National Council of Romanian Women, a WIDF affiliate. After the proposal was seconded by Helvi Sipilä, the Finnish representative of the commission, it was passed by the commission and presented to the UN General Assembly, which adopted a resolution in December 1972 to honor women with International Women's Year in 1975; however, it did not approve hosting a conference.

WIDF activists made their own plans to host their organization's 30th anniversary congress in East Berlin in October 1975. Patricia Hutar, a US representative to the Commission on the Status of Women, suggested that the commission revisit the idea of a conference in 1974 to avoid the appearance that only communist women were supporting the initiative. The UN General Assembly approved hosting what would be the World Conference on Women of July 1975 in Mexico City, but authorized no funds for the event. Individuals and affiliated organizations of the WIDF participated in both the UN Conference and the WIDF Congress. The Mexico City Conference spawned the United Nations Decade for Women, establishing calls to draft the Convention on the Elimination of All Forms of Discrimination Against Women (CEDAW), and host follow-up World Conferences on Women in 1980 and 1985. WIDF members were involved in both of the conferences and the proposal for CEDAW. The WIDF Congress was attended by women from 43 African nations, 33 Asian countries, 29 European states; the remaining 33 countries were represented by delegates from the Americas, Australia, and New Zealand.

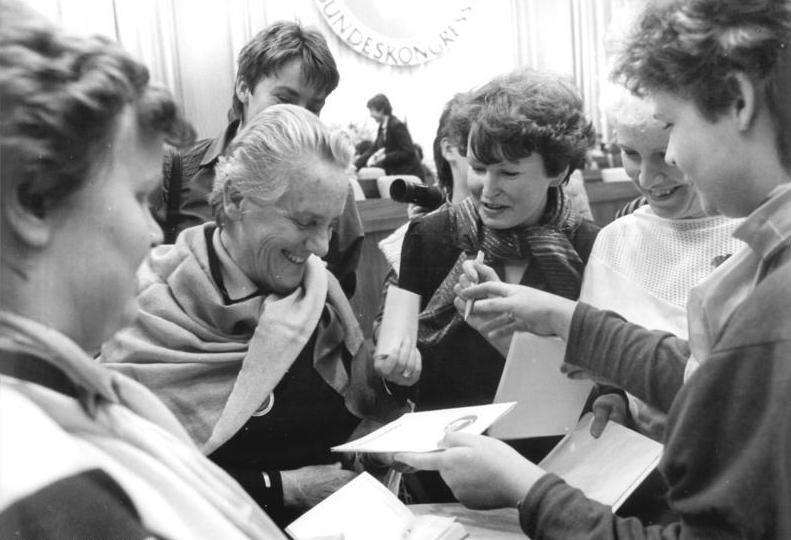
Freda Brown (center) in East Germany, 1987

In 1976, the WIDF sponsored an international conference in Sofia, Women in Agriculture, focused on educational training and developing cooperative farms in the Global South. The organization co-initiated the drive for UNESCO to recognize 1979 as the International Year of the Child. In 1980, the WIDF worked to establish a second United Nations International Research and Training Institute for the Advancement of Women (INSTRAW) center in Sofia to focus on training women from Africa, Asia, and the Middle East for leadership positions in the socio-political-economic fight for their rights. The WIDF also established similar development courses for Latin American women which were hosted at a facility in Havana. These courses continued through 1985, leading up to the UN's Third World Conference on the status of women, known as the Nairobi Conference. (Note: Nairobi Conference: refers to the United Nations Third World Conference on the status of women, also known as The World Conference to Review and Appraise the Achievements of the United Nations Decade for Women, as the World Conference on Women, 1985 and as Nairobi 1985. It was held from 15 to 26 July 1985 in Nairobi, Kenya. The goal of the conference was to appraise the achievements of the United Nations Decade for Women (1976–1985). A final document, the Nairobi Forward-Looking Strategies for the Advancement of Women, was produced.(UN (2023))) WIDF activists also visited the war-torn Palestinian territories and Western Sahara. According to Regina Marques, a member of the WIDF board of directors in 2021, the organization was honored as a United Nations Messenger of Peace in 1986 by Javier Pérez de Cuéllar, Secretary-General of the United Nations.

== Reorganization and current status (1991–present) ==
Following the dissolution of the Soviet Union in 1991, the WIDF headquarters moved from Berlin to Paris. The federation was reorganized in 1994 under the leadership of Sylvie Jan. At the 1995 World Conference on Women, many WIDF activists from Eastern Europe explained that their organizations had been dissolved and their voices had been silenced. In 2002, when Brazilian member Márcia Campos was elected president, the office relocated to Brasília, and in 2007 the WIDF's secretariat was located in São Paulo. Campos was succeeded by Salvadoran Lorena Peña after her election at the 2016 WIDF Congress of Bogotá, and the worldwide headquarters moved to the Palomo neighborhood of San Salvador at 23 Calle Poniente & Avenida Las Victorias #123. Peña continued to lead the organization in 2023.

=== Multilingual names ===
The Women's International Democratic Federation (WIDF) has a number of non-English names, including:

- Federação Democrática Internacional de Mulheres (FDIM)
- Fédération démocratique internationale des femmes (FDIF)
- Federación Democratica Internacional de Mujeres (FDIM)
- Internationale Demokratische Frauenföderation (IDFF)
- Mezdunarodnaja Demokraticeskaja Federacija Zenscin (MDFŽ)

== Scholarly perception of the organization ==
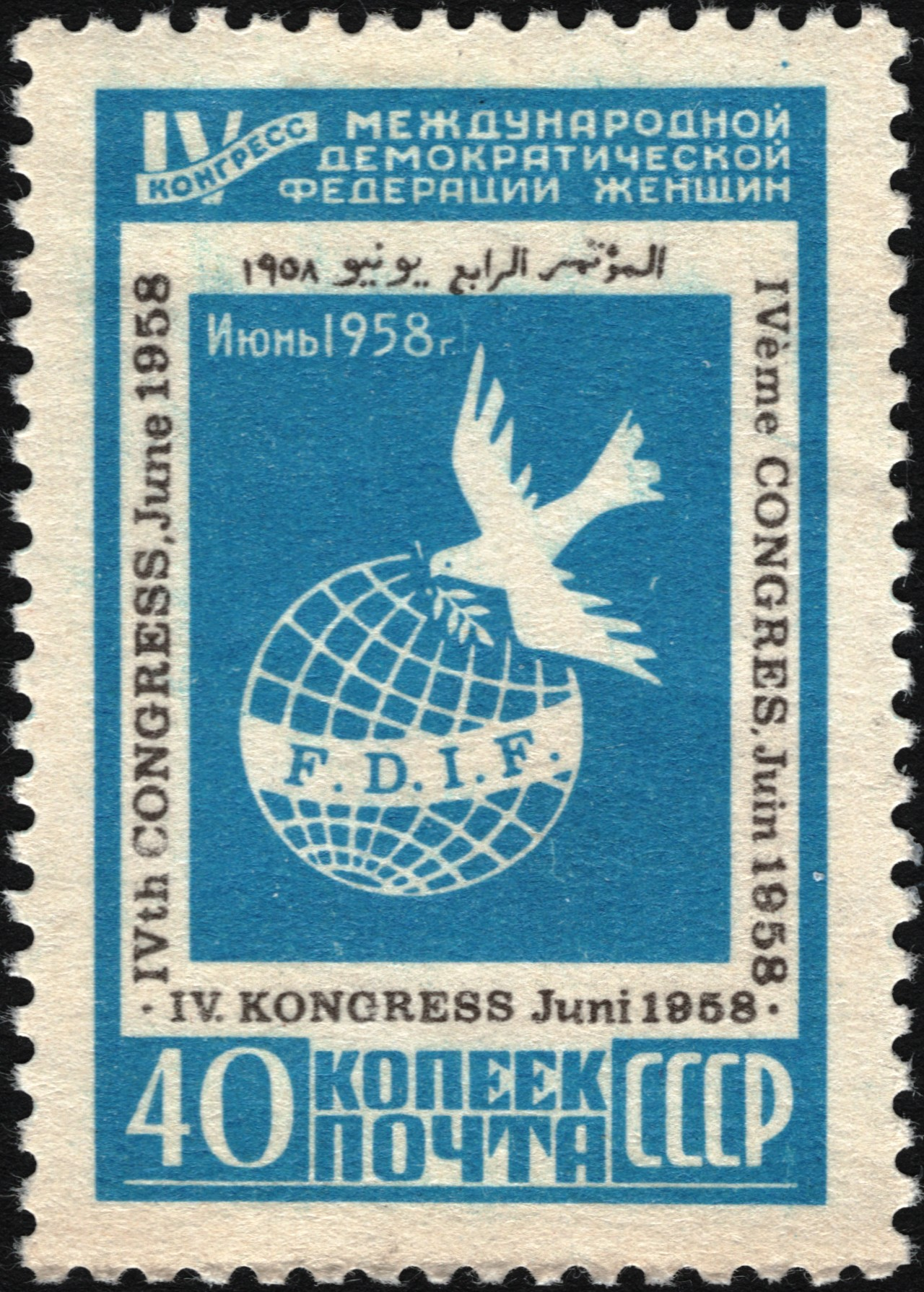
USSR postage stamp marking the fourth Congress of the WIDF (French acronym FDIF used here), June 1958

According to de Haan, Cold War policies and investigations and repercussions from the investigations of McCarthyism had long-lasting effects on knowledge about the WIDF and international women's interactions after World War II. Although it was inaugurated in Paris, the WIDF was described by 20th-century scholars as originating behind the Iron Curtain. Cold War stereotypes impacted the legacy of the organization, effectively erasing it from the history of international women's movements. When the WIDF was described by scholars or activists, it was depicted as a pro-Soviet, communist front organization, which received both political and financial support from the USSR. Some of these accounts were based on recovered records of the FBI and the House Un-American Activities Committee. Because the official stance of communism was to view feminism as a "bourgeois ideology promoted by upper-class women seeking to advance their own interests at the expense of class solidarity", the perception of the WIDF was that it was not a women's rights organization but rather an organization designed to spread socialist ideology. Historian Celia Donert states that the activists of the WIDF were involved in developing transnational socialist networks and that the political context of party and state ideology impacted how they advocated for women's interests, but that they were focused on resolving women's issues.

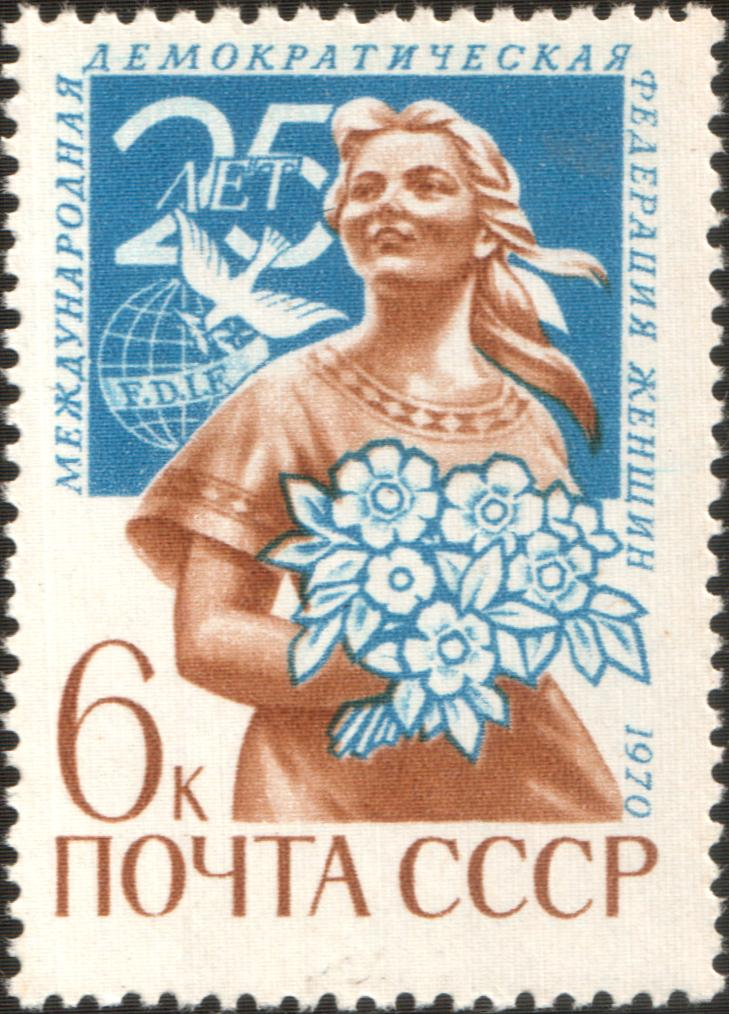
USSR postage stamp featuring a woman with a bouquet of flowers, the emblem of the WIDF and Russian text for its 25th Anniversary, 1970

Focus by scholars on the social and cultural history of the Cold War and increased feminist scholarship on communist women's activism since the dissolution of the Soviet Union have led to a clearer understanding that women's international relationships were more complex and diverse than previously acknowledged. The full history of the WIDF is difficult to ascertain, as there are only partial organizational records from Berlin. Chinese records are not widely available to academics and many records appear to have been lost. De Haan stated that records of the early organization in France remain in private hands; some materials were destroyed, and others moved multiple times.

Scholars of the 21st century have subsequently described the WIDF as an active feminist organization advocating for women's rights, and not merely a communist attempt to manipulate women. The WIDF, according to academics like Elisabeth Armstrong and Suzy Kim, played an important role in supporting women's anti-colonial and anti-racist struggles in Asia, Africa, and Latin America. In examining the WIDF's role in the peace movement, Suzy Kim refuted that feminism and pacifism declined during the 1950s, stating that WIDF activists launched their campaign for women's rights and global peace during the Cold War with their anti-war campaign against the conflict in Korea. She also concluded that long before second-wave feminists began promoting intersectional analysis, the WIDF incorporated the principles of evaluating overlapping factors such as class, gender, race, and religion to determine how inequalities were perpetuated globally.

Scholar Taewoo Kim made a study of the Korean commission and its report, stating that declassification of military documents and research by South Korean academics, have confirmed that the conditions described by the WIDF commission were true. Omissions in the WIDF report that some of the atrocities committed resulted from the activities of Korean right-wing youth groups were possibly due, according to Kim, to reliance on North Korean interpreters and government manipulation of some of the witnesses. Kim also found the WIDF report significant in that it reveals and documents sexual violence against women during the war. De Haan called the WIDF "the largest and probably most influential international women's organization of the post-1945 era", an assessment which was seconded by Taewoo Kim.

== Congresses and executive board ==
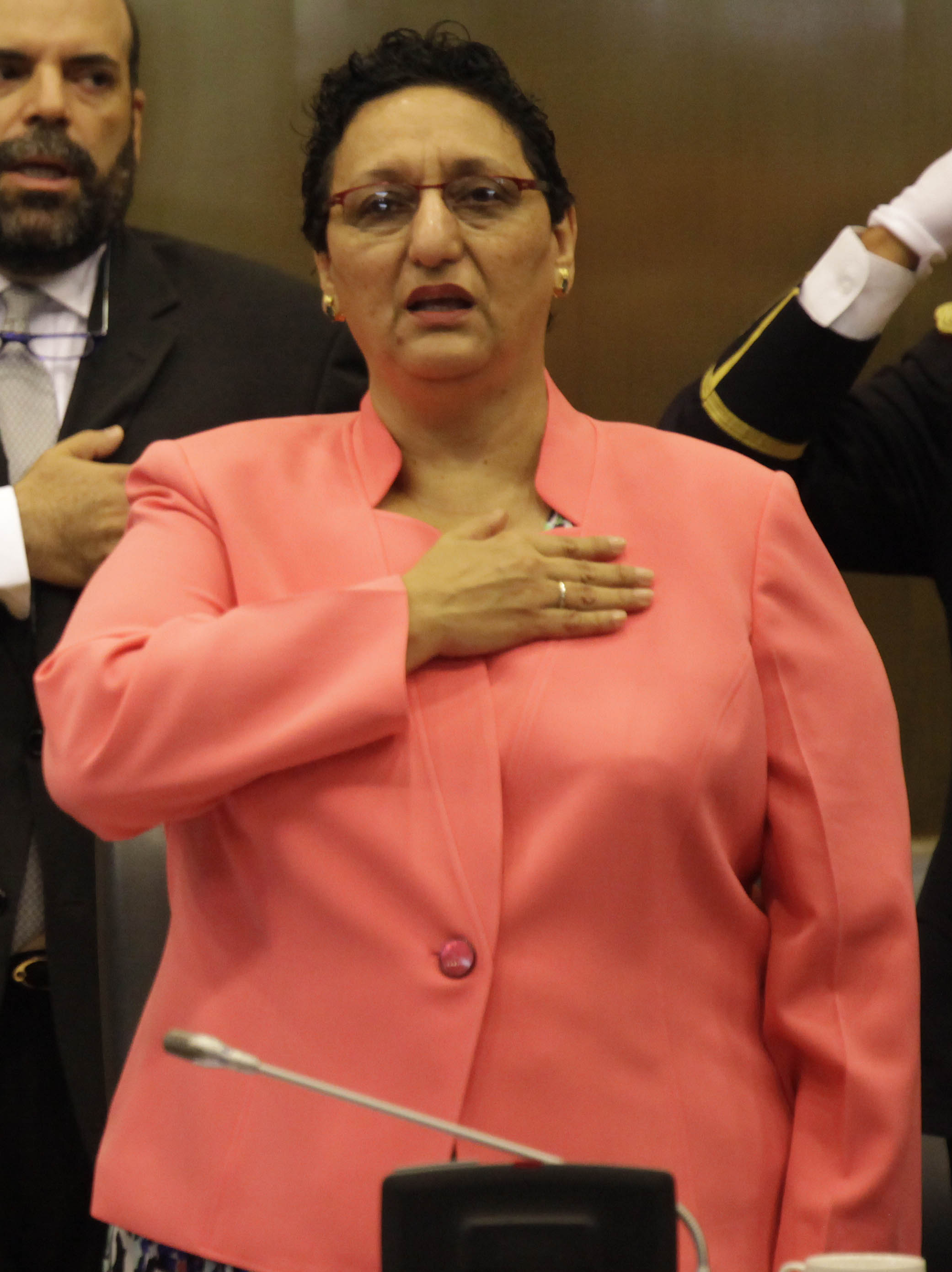
Lorena Peña, 2015

- 1st, Founding Congress, 1945, 26 November – 1 December, Paris – President Eugénie Cotton (France), Vice presidents – Dolores Ibárruri (Spain), Nina Popova (USSR), and Gene Weltfish (US).
- 2nd, 1948, 1–16 December, Budapest – President Eugénie Cotton (France), Vice presidents – Cai Chang (China), Dolores Ibárruri (Spain), Nina Popova (USSR), and Gene Weltfish (US).
- 3rd, 1953, 5–10 June, Copenhagen – President Eugénie Cotton (France), Vice presidents – Erzsébet Andics (Hungarian People's Republic), Andrea Andreen (Sweden), Cai Chang (China), Monica Felton (UK), Dolores Ibárruri (Spain), Funmilayo Ransome Kuti (Colonial Nigeria), Rita Montagnana (Italy), Saiza Nabarawi (Egypt), Nina Popova (Russia), and Lilly Wächter (West Germany).
- 4th, 1958, 1–5 June, Vienna – President Eugénie Cotton (France).
- 5th, 1963, Moscow – President Eugénie Cotton (France). Cotton died in 1967, and was succeeded by Hertta Kuusinen.
- 6th, 1969, 14–17 June, Helsinki – President Hertta Kuusinen (Finland). Kuusinen died in 1974, and was succeeded by Freda Brown.
- 7th, 1975, 20–24 October, East Berlin – President Freda Brown (Australia), Vice presidents – Aruna Asaf Ali (India), Fathia Bettahar (Algeria), Vilma Espín de Castro (Cuba), Fanny Edelman (Argentina), Fuki Kushida (Japan), Valentina Nikolayeva-Tereshkova (USSR), Gisèle Théret (France), and Ilse Thiele (East Germany).
- 8th, 1981, 8–13 October, Prague – President Freda Brown (Australia).
- 9th, 1987, 23–27 June, Moscow – President Freda Brown (Australia). Brown's presidency ended in 1991.
- 10th, 1991, 30–31 March – 1 April, Sheffield, UK – President Fatima Ahmed Ibrahim (Sudan). Ibrahim was succeeded in 1994 by Sylvie Jan of France.
- 11th, 1994, 28–30 April, Le Blanc-Mesnil, France – President Sylvie Jan (France).
- 12th, 1998, 19–21 November, Bobigny, France – President Sylvie Jan (France).
- 13th, 2002, November, Beirut, Lebanon – President Márcia Campos (Brazil).
- 14th, 2007, 9–13 April, Caracas, Venezuela – President Márcia Campos (Brazil).
- 15th, 2012, 8–12 April, Brasília, Brazil – President Márcia Campos (Brazil).
- 16th, 2016, 15–18 September, Bogotá, Colombia – President Márcia Campos (Brazil). During the congress, Salvadoran politician Lorena Peña was elected president and installed.
- 17th, 2022, 25–30 April, Caracas, Venezuela – President Lorena Peña (El Salvador).

== Affiliates (historical and present) ==
Country	Name	Ref
Albania	Union of Albanian Women	
Algeria	National Union of Algerian Women	
Angola	Organization of Angolan Women	
Argentina	Unión de Mujeres de la Argentina (Women's Union of Argentina)	
Australia	Union of Australian Women	
Austria	Bund demokratischer Frauen Österreichs (Federation of Democratic Women of Austria)	
Bangladesh	Bangladesh Mahila Parishad (Bangladesh Women's Congress)	
Belgium	Rassemblement des femmes pour la paix et le bien-être Women's Assembly for Peace and Welfare	
Benin	Democratic Women's Organization of Dahomey	
Bolivia	Unión de Mujeres de Bolivia (Women's Union of Bolivia)	
Brazil	Brazilian Women's Federation	
Brazil	Seção Feminina do Partido Comunista Brasileiro (Women's Section of the Brazilian Communist Party)	
Bulgaria	Committee of the Bulgarian Women's Movement	
Burundi	Union of Burundian Women	
Cambodia	Association of Democratic Khmer Women	
Cambodia	Kampuchean Revolutionary Women's Association	
Cameroon	Democratic Union of Cameroon Women	
Canada	Congress of Canadian Women	
Cape Verde	Organizaçao da Mulher de Cabo Verde (Organization of Women of Cape Verde)	
Chile	Unión de Mujeres de Chile (Women's Union of Chile)	
China	All-China Women's Federation	
China	National Federation of Women of the People's Republic of China	
Colombia	Unión de Mujeres Demócratas (Union of Democratic Women)	
Costa Rica	Alianza de Mujeres Costarricenses (Costa Rican Women's Alliance)	
Cuba	Federation of Cuban Women	
Cuba	Federación Democrática de Mujeres Cubanas (Democratic Federation of Cuban Women)	
Cyprus	Pan-Cyprian Federation of Women's Associations	
Czechoslovakia	Czechoslovak Women's Union	
Czechoslovakia	Národní fronta žen (National Women's Front)	
Denmark	Danish Democratic Women's Society	
Dominican Republic	Grupo de mujeres de la República Dominicana (Women's Group of the Dominican Republic)	
East Germany	Democratic Women's Federation of Germany	
Ecuador	Frente Unido de Mujeres (United Front of Women)	
El Salvador	Progressive Women's Association of El Salvador	
Ethiopia	Revolutionary Ethiopia Women's Association	
Finland	Suomen Naisten Demokraattinen Liitto (Democratic League of Finnish Women)	
France	Union des Femmes Françaises (Union of French Women)	
Gambia	Gambia Labour Union Women's Section	
Greece	Panhellenic Democratic Union of Women	
Guadeloupe	Union des Femmes Guadeloupéennes (Union of Guadeloupean Women)	
Guyana	Women's Progressive Organization	
Haiti	Union des Femmes Haitiennes (Haitian Women's Union)	
Honduras	Honduras Women's Association	
Hungary	National Council of Hungarian Women	
Iceland	Icelandic Women's Union for Culture and Peace	
India	National Federation of Indian Women	
Indonesia	Gerwani (Indonesian Women's Movement)	
Iran	Democratic Organization of Iranian Women	
Iraq	General Federation of Iraqi Women	
Iraq	Iraqi Women's League	
Israel	Israeli Women's Federation of Mapam	
Israel	Movement of Democratic Women of Israel	
Italy	Unione donne in Italia (Union of Italian Women)	
Japan	Democratic Union of Korean Women in Japan	
Japan	Federation of Japanese Women's Organizations	
Jordan	Arab Women's League of Jordan	
Jordan	Arab Women's Organization of Jordan	
Kuwait	Women's Social and Cultural Association	
Laos	Association of Patriotic Laotian Women	
Laos	Lao Women's Union	
Lebanon	Lebanese Women's Rights League	
Lesotho	Basutoland Congress Party Women's League	
Luxembourg	Union of Luxembourg Women	
Madagascar	Permanent National Commission for Protection of the Rights of Women and Children of the Madagascar Solidarity Committee	
Martinique	Union des Femmes de la Martinique (Women's Union of Martinique)	
Mauritius	Mauritius Women's Committee	
Mexico	Unión Nacional de Mujeres Mexicanas (National Union of Mexican Women)	
Mongolia	Committee of Mongolian Women	
Morocco	Association Démocratique des Femmes du Maroc (Democratic Association of Moroccan Women)	
Morocco	Women's Section of the Socialist Union of Popular Forces	
Mozambique	Organizaçio da mulher Moçambicana (Organization of Mozambican Women)	
Namibia	Women's Section of SWAPO	
Nepal	Nepal Women's Organization	
Netherlands	Nederlandse Vrouwenbeweging (Dutch Women's Movement)	
New Zealand	Union of New Zealand Women	
Nicaragua	Association of Nicaraguan Women Luisa Amanda Espinoza	
Nicaragua	Democratic Women's Organization of Nicaragua	
Nicaragua	Nicaraguan Women's Federation	
Nigeria	Federation of Nigerian Women's Organizations	
Northern Ireland	Northern Ireland Women's Rights Movement	
North Korea	Korean Democratic Women's League	
Norway	Norsk Kvinneforbund (Norwegian Women's Association)	
Oman	Organization of Omani Women	
Pakistan	Democratic Women's Association	
Palestine	General Union of Palestinian Women	
Palestine	Palenstinian Union of Women Workers' Committees	
Panama	Federación Nacional de Mujeres Democráticas (National Federation of Democratic Women)	
Panama	Women's Commission for the Defense of the Rights of Women and Children	
Paraguay	Women's Union of Paraguay	
Peru	Popular Union of Peruvian Women	
Philippines	Katipunan Ng Bagong Pilipina (Association of New Philippine Women)	
Poland	League of Polish Women	
Poland	National Council of Polish Women	
Portugal	Conselho Nacional das Mulheres Portuguesas (National Council of Portuguese Women)	
Portugal	Movimento Democrático de Mulheres (Democratic Women's Movement)	
Puerto Rico	Federation of Puerto Rican Women	
Republic of the Congo	Revolutionary Women's Union of Congo	
Réunion	Women's Union of Réunion	
Romania	National Council of Women	
São Tomé and Príncipe	Women's Organization of São Tomé and Príncipe	
Senegal	Democratic Union of the Women of Senegal	
Seychelles	Women's League of the Seychelles People's United Party, a.k.a. Seychelles Women's Council	
Sierra Leone	All People's Congress Women's Organization	
Somalia	Organization of Somali Women	
South Africa	African National Congress Women's League	
South Vietnam	South Vietnam Women's Union for Liberation	
South Yemen	General Union of Yemeni Women	
Soviet Union	Antifascist Committee of Soviet Women	
Spain	Movimiento Democrático de Mujeres (Democratic Women's Movement)	
Sri Lanka	Lanka Kantha Peramuna (Women's Front of Sri Lanka)	
Sri Lanka	Mathar Sangam (Women's Section of the Democratic Workers Congress of Sri Lanka)	
Sudan	Sudanese Women's Union	
Suriname	Women's Section of the 25 February Movement	
Sweden	Svenska Kvinnors Vänsterförbund (Swedish Women's Left Association)	
Switzerland	Swiss Women's Federation for Peace and Progress (Fédération des femmes suisses pour la paix et le progrès/Schweizer Frauenvereinigung für Frieden und Fortschritt)	
Tanzania	Umoja Ya Wanawake Tanzania (Union of Tanzanian Women)	
Venezuela	Women's Section of the International Solidarity Committee	
Vietnam	Vietnam Women's Union	
West Germany	Democratic Women's League of Berlin (West Germany)	
Western Sahara	National Union of Sahrawi Women	
United Kingdom	National Assembly of Women	
United States	Congress of American Women	
United States	National Council of Negro Women	
United States	Women for Racial and Economic Equality	
Uruguay	Coordinating Commission of Uruguayan Women	
Yugoslavia	Conference for Social Activities of Yugoslav Women	
Yugoslavia	Women's Antifascist Front	
Zimbabwe	African National Council of Zimbabwe	

== Selected publications ==
- Commission to Asia and Africa (December 1948). The Women of Asia and Africa: Documents (Report). Budapest, Hungary: Women's International Democratic Federation.
- Commission for the Investigation of War Atrocities in Korea (1951). We Accuse!: Korea (Report). Berlin, East Germany: Women's International Democratic Federation. (Chinese version)

== See also ==
- List of Women's International Democratic Federation people
- International Communist Women's Secretariat
- International Socialist Women's Conferences
- Socialist International Women

=== Other post-1945 organizations labelled as communist fronts ===
- International Association of Democratic Lawyers
- International Federation of Resistance Fighters – Association of Anti-Fascists
- International Organization of Journalists
- International Union of Students
- World Federation of Democratic Youth
- World Federation of Scientific Workers
- World Federation of Trade Unions
- World Peace Council
