= Minella =

Minella is a surname. Notable people with the surname include:

- Angiola Minella (1920–1988), Italian politician
- José María Minella (1909–1981), Argentine football player and manager
- Lani Minella (born 1950), American voice actress, voice director, and producer
- Mandy Minella (born 1985), Luxembourgish professional tennis player

== See also ==
- Minella Indo, Irish racehorse
- Minella Times, Irish-bred Thoroughbred racehorse
- Minella bianca, variety of grape
