= Useldinger =

Useldinger is a surname. Notable people with the surname include:

- Arthur Useldinger (1904–1978), Luxembourgian politician
- Yvonne Useldinger (1921–2009), Luxembourgian politician
