= Ida Bachmann =

Danish librarian and activist (1900–1995)

Vice President of the Women's International Democratic Federation
- In office 1951–?

Personal details
- Born: 1990
- Died: 1995 (aged 94–95)

Ida Bachmann (1900–1995) was a Danish librarian and journalist who is known for her feminist activities. She was a member of the Commission of the Women's International Democratic Federation (WIDF) and served as its vice president.

== Biography ==
She was born in 1900. She worked as a librarian in Kolding. She was a member of the WIDF. Following the occupation of Denmark by Nazi Germany during World War II she left Denmark for the USA. There she worked at the US War Information Office. She was also involved in other journalist activities in the USA. Following her return to Denmark she published a book, America! America!, on her US experience in 1947 and continued to serve as a head librarian.

Bachmann and Kate Fleron visited North Korea along with representatives from other countries in 1951 during the Korean War. The same year Bachman was elected as the vice president of the Women's International Democratic Federation in a meeting held in China.

Bachmann died in 1995.
