= Arab Women Organization of Jordan =

- Founded: 2007
- Founded at: Amman, Jordan
- Purpose: Women's rights Gender equality Women's empowerment
- Headquarters: Jabal Amman, Amman, Jordan
- Region served: Jordan
- Website: awo.org.jo

The Arab Women's Organization of Jordan (AWO) is a women's rights organization established in Jordan in 1970.

The AWO is a non-profit organisation working for gender equality and the empowerment of women and girls in Jordan. It seeks to establish women's rights as human rights, and to advocate for politician and legal reforms supportive of women and girls in Jordan.

It has long worked within the Baqa'a refugee camp, providing support for Palestinian refugees. Since 2011 it has also provided support for Syrian refugees in centres in the Irbid, Mafraq, and Zarqa Governorates of Jordan.

AWO operates a network - the Mosawa (Equality) Network - with community-based organisations in Jordan, supporting outreach activities to difficult-to-reach sectors in Jordan.

AWO is affiliated to the General Federation of Jordanian Women (GFJW), the General Union of Voluntary Societies (GUVS), the Recycling Coalition (RC). and the Women's International Democratic Federation.
