= Erzsébet Metzker Vass =

Hungarian politician (1915–1980)

Speaker of the National Assembly of Hungary
- In office 21 March 1963 – 14 April 1967
- Preceded by: Sándor Rónai
- Succeeded by: Gyula Kállai

Personal details
- Born: 20 March 1915; Budafok, Austria-Hungary
- Died: 8 August 1980 (aged 65); Budapest, People's Republic of Hungary
- Political party: SZDP, MDP, MSZMP
- Profession: politician

Erzsébet Vass (née Metzker; 20 March 1915 – 8 August 1980) was a Hungarian politician, who served as Speaker of the National Assembly of Hungary between 1963 and 1967. She was the first woman who held this position in Hungary.

== Early life and education ==
Erzsébet Metzker was born 20 March 1915 in the Budafok neighborhood of Budapest in what at the time was Austria-Hungary to Teréz (née Berghammer) and János Metzker. Her mother was a factory worker and her father was a painter. At the age of fourteen, she became a factory worker and completed training at the Albertfalva Rubber Factory in 1930. She married Márton Andra in 1931 and had two children with him before they divorced in 1947. In 1933, Andra began working at the Lóden Post Factory, but was terminated for participating in a strike. She became a welder at the Budafoki Enamel Factory in 1934 and was promoted to do scribing in the enamel workshop in 1939. She left factory work in 1947, the same year she married stonemason, István Vass.

== Political career ==
Vass joined the Social Democratic Party of Hungary in 1939 and during the war was politically active. In 1945, she switched her alliance to the Hungarian Communist Party and began serving on the Budafok party committee. After attending party schooling in 1946, Vass joined the leadership of the Democratic Association of Hungarian Women, becoming the organization's secretary general in 1950. That year she also became a founder of the National Peace Council, an organization she would become vice president of from 1972 until 1980. She was appointed to the Executive Council of the Women's International Democratic Federation in 1951, and re-elected in 1953, serving until 1956.

Vass became a member of the Hungarian National Assembly in 1953 and was elected as its vice president in 1955, serving until 1963. She was elected as the first woman to serve as the Speaker of the National Assembly of Hungary in 1963 and held that office until 1967. She was awarded the Szocialista Magyarországért Érdemrend (Socialist Hungarian Order of Merit) in 1980 and died that year on 8 August, while still serving in the National Assembly.

Political offices
Preceded by Sándor Rónai	Speaker of the National Assembly; 1963–1967	Succeeded by Gyula Kállai
