= Congress of American Women =

American women's rights organization

The Congress of American Women was an American women's rights organization. It was founded in New York on International Women's Day, March 8, 1946, following the 1945 founding conference of the Women's International Democratic Federation in Paris, to which it affiliated. Its primary organizer was Elinor S. Gimbel (wife of Louis S. Gimbel, Jr., grandson of Adam Gimbel of Gimbels department store). In 1948 the organization was attacked as a communist front organization by the House Un-American Activities Committee and was forced to register as a "subversive" organization. The organization was finally dissolved in 1950.

The congress was an official US branch of the Women's International Democratic Federation, which though an antifascist organization was pro-Soviet. The organization supported progressive policies giving women full rights and equality both in the home and economically. They supported labor organizing and civil rights and were against anticommunist attacks on liberals. Though many members were communists or part of the popular front, membership in the organization included a broad mix of liberal, middle-class women.

Author Eleanor Flexner was appointed executive director in 1946. Among its other members were anthropologist Gene Weltfish, aviator Jacqueline Cochran, social worker Mary van Kleeck, educator Charlotte Hawkins Brown, author and artist Muriel Draper, labor leader Elizabeth Gurley Flynn, politician Cornelia Bryce Pinchot, and journalist Susan B. Anthony II. Actress Jean Muir was briefly a member.

== Works cited ==
- Laville, Helen (2002). Cold War women: the international activities of American women's organisations. Manchester University Press.
- Weigand, Kate (2001). Red Feminism: American Communism and the Making of Women's Liberation. Johns Hopkins University Press.
