= Trees Sunito Heyligers =

Dutch lawyer and activist

Teresa "Trees" Sunito Heyligers, sometimes written as Soenito Heyligers (1915–2003), was a Dutch lawyer and activist. She was the wife of Indonesian activist Raden Mas Djojowirono Sunito and an active member of the Dutch Women's Movement and the Women's International Democratic Federation (WIDF). She traveled to Korea with the WIDF in 1951 to report on the results of the war. After her husband's arrest the following year, Heyligers moved to Indonesia, where she worked as a translator and served as a defense lawyer for Njono, a leader of the Communist Party of Indonesia, in his 1966 trial.

== Early life ==
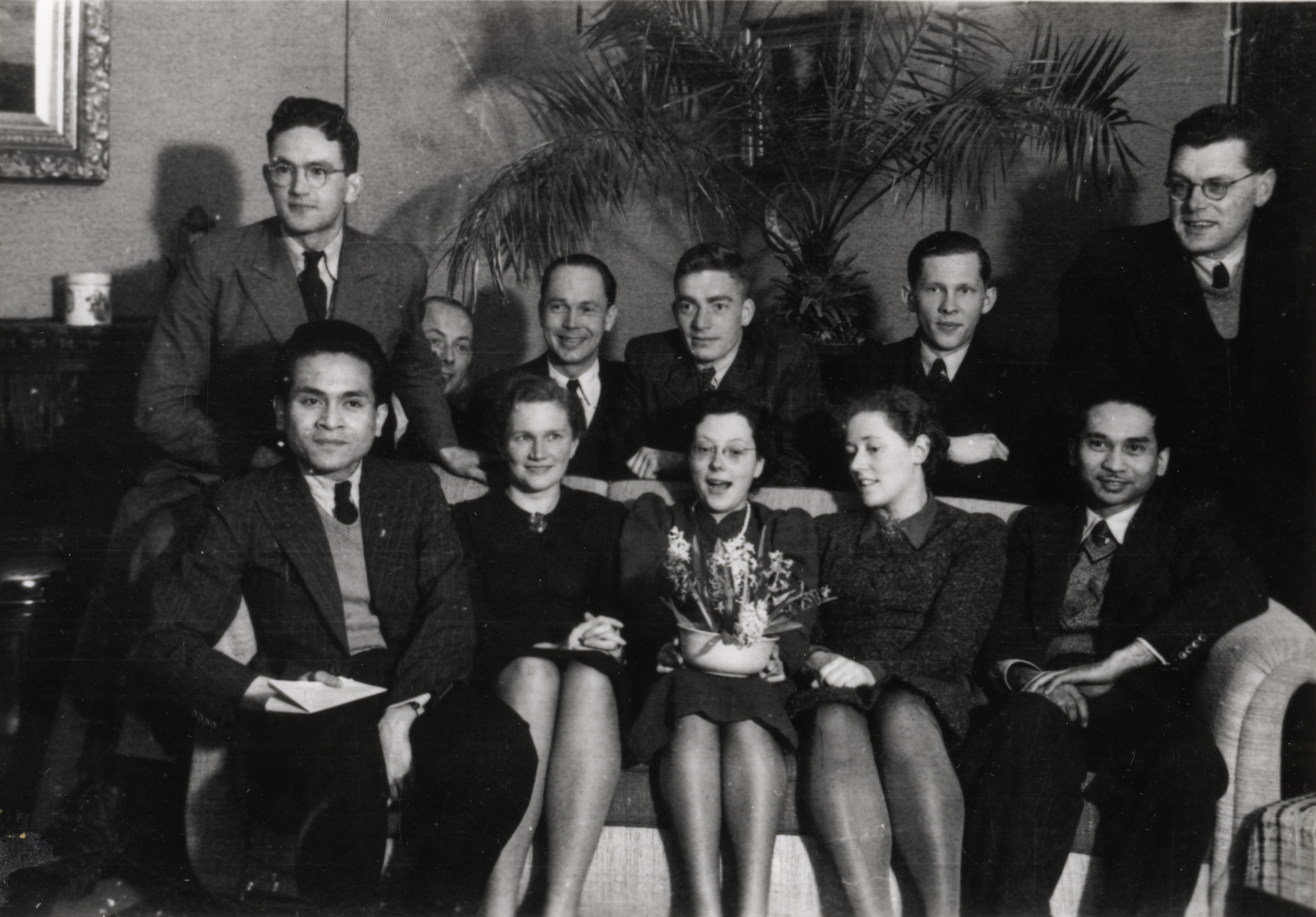
Heyligers circa 1942

Heyligers was born Teresa Heyligers in 1915. She studied Dutch and Indian law at Leiden University, graduating on May 9, 1940. While at the university, she met the Indonesian activist Raden Mas Djojowirono Sunito, a member of the Perhimpoenan Indonesia (PI). Following graduation, she started working at a law firm, where Sunito later worked, and the couple married on February 15, 1945, having one daughter and two sons.

== Career and activism ==
In December 1946, a number of other prominent members of the PI returned to the Dutch East Indies but Sunito and Heyligers stayed behind. Sunito was appointed as a chargé d'affaires, representing Indonesia in the Netherlands, although his diplomatic rank was not recognised in the Netherlands as Indonesia was not acknowledged as an independent country. Around the same time, Heyligers was the president of the Dutch Women's Movement (NVB), a pacifist organisation which advocated for the withdrawal of Dutch troops from Indonesia. Along with Toeti Soedjanadiwirja, Evie Poetiray and Soetiasmi Soejono, she served as a courier for the PI. She represented a number of conscripted military personnel who deserted during the Indonesian National Revolution, including Piet van Staveren, who were put on trial in the Netherlands.

The NVB was a member organisation of the Women's International Democratic Federation (WIDF) and following an invitation by another affiliated group, the Korean Democratic Women's Union, Heyligers joined an international delegation of the WIDF to travel to Korea in 1951. The group was led by the Canadian communist Nora Rodd, with Heyligers serving as a secretary alongside Miluše Svatošová. The delegation traveled between cities controlled by China and the Korean People's Army, preparing a final report titled We Accuse! which documented the destruction of the war, particularly the bombings, massacres and torture, and violence against women.

In November 1952, Sunito was arrested along with fellow PI leader Go Gien Twjan on the charge of carrying out political and communist activities, as the justice minister Leendert Antonie Donker argued that following the revolution, Indonesian citizens had become foreign nationals in the Netherlands. The arrests were protested by H. M. van Randwijk, S. J. Rutgers, W. F. Wertheim and Elisabeth Keesing and led to a case before the Dutch Supreme Court, which ruled that Indonesian citizens had become foreign aliens but there was no legal basis for the deportation of Go and Sunito. Despite the ruling, Donker expressed his intention to proceed with the deportation and so Sunito and Go left the country with their wives and children on February 7, 1953.

Following the move to Indonesia, Heyligers became a translator and attorney for the Indonesian State Commercial Bank. From November 1965 to May 1966, Sunito was imprisoned during the Transition to the New Order. Around the same time, Heyligers, a member of the Himpunan Sardjana Indonesia, was fired from her job and began working in translation. There were a series of trials in early 1966 to try Indonesian individuals who had supported the 1965 coup but as few lawyers agreed to act as defense counsel for the accused, Heyligers was offered a deal to serve as the defense lawyer in the first major trial in exchange for the release of her husband from prison. She represented Njono, a trade unionist and leader of the Communist Party of Indonesia, who was brought before the court on charges of recruiting and training communist paramilitary forces. As a result of her work representing Njono, she was arrested in 1968 and that January, a chapter of the NVB wrote a letter protesting her detention to the Indonesian Embassy in the Netherlands.

== Later life ==
Between 1966 and 1971, Heyligers and Sunito taught in Dutch and Indonesian and worked in translation. Sunito moved back to the Netherlands in 1971 and Heyligers and their children soon followed. Sunito died on August 21, 1979. Heyligers died in 2003.
