= Lilly Wächter =

German politician (1899–1989)

Lilly Wächter (born as Lilli Schuster on 26 June 1899 in Karlsruhe; died 20 December 1989 in Bühl) was a German Social Democratic Party of Germany (SPD) politician and official of the Democratic Women's Federation of Germany. In 1952, she was arrested and prosecuted for sedition in Allied-occupied Germany by US forces; fined and imprisoned, but exonerated on appeal.

== Biography ==
Lilly Wächter was born out of wedlock. Her mother Sophie Schuster (1878–1944) married the unskilled worker Moses Moritz Steigerwald (1870–1944) on August 1, 1907. Lilly's half-brother Feist Ferdinand (1908–1939) emerged from the marriage. Sophie, Moses Moritz and Feist Ferdinand Steigerwald died in various Nazi concentration camps because of their Jewish origins; Lilly's stepfather in Theresienstadt family camp, her mother in Auschwitz concentration camp and her half-brother in Buchenwald concentration camp.

Wächter became a member of the SPD together with her parents in 1923. As a young woman, she initially lived in Rastatt, where she was often arrested and mistreated as a "half-Jew" during the National Socialist regime. Before World War II she was employed as an office clerk, but was later drafted and worked in a factory. She was married and a housewife from 1951; her husband worked as an accountant.

After World War II Wächter joined the DFD, becoming a member of its presidium "as a courageous peace fighter" and was chairwoman of the organization from July 1953. She held this office until the DFD was banned in April 1957.

== Sedition trial ==
Lilly Wächter travelled to North Korea in May 1951 as a member of a 21-person party of Women's International Democratic Federation (WIDF) activists evaluating conditions on the Korean peninsula during the Korean War. A WIDF report on their findings, We Accuse, was very highly critical of the effects of bombing by the United States Air Force, and of war crimes allegedly perpetrated by United Nations Forces.

On Wächter's return to Germany, she spoke at public meetings about WIDF's findings, including in her talks graphic descriptions of sexual violence, rape and torture which she asserted were committed by American forces. She was arrested by the Allied Control Council's authorities, who alleged she had broken Allied Control Council Law No. 14, which dealt with 'protecting the interests of the occupiers in Germany'. She was tried and convicted in the US Court of the Allied High Commission, fined and imprisoned. An appeal was held in 1952, which quashed her conviction. The thrust of the prosecution's case was that language used by Wächter amounted to seditious utterances likely to affect the 'minds and emotions of those in the audience who were uneducated and subject to emotional disturbances.' Wächter's defence centered around the notion of the truth of her descriptions. The prosecution took the view that 'the truth is not a defense, at common law, to a charge of seditious utterances'. The defence argued that sedition required incitement to act, and that Wächter's words were better framed as criminal libel, to which under British and US law, truth was a defence.
