= Freda Brown =

Freda Yetta Brown
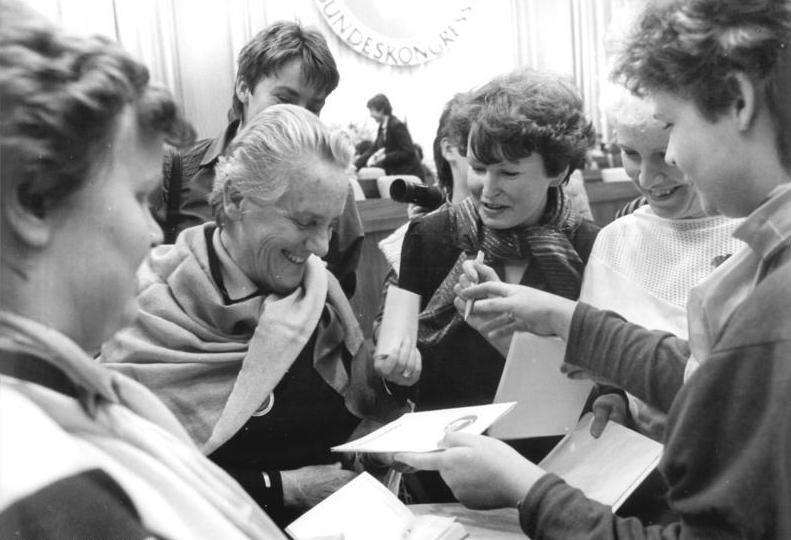
- Freda Brown (second from left) in East Berlin in 1987

President of the Women's International Democratic Federation
- In office 1975–1991
- Preceded by: Hertta Kuusinen
- Succeeded by: Fatima Ahmed Ibrahim

Personal details
- Born: Freda Yetta Lewis; 9 June 1919 Erskineville, New South Wales, Australia
- Died: 26 May 2009 (aged 89)
- Party: Communist Party of Australia (1936-1971); Socialist Party of Australia (from 1971)
- Children: Lee Rhiannon
- Education: Sydney Girls High School
- Occupation: Women's rights activist Communist activist Journalist
- Awards: Lenin Peace Prize (1979)

Freda Yetta Brown (née Lewis; 9 June 1919 – 26 May 2009) was an Australian political activist and feminist who was a member of the Communist Party of Australia and later the Socialist Party. She is the only Australian woman to have been awarded a Lenin Peace Prize.

== Early life ==
Brown was born on 9 June 1919 at her parents' home in Erskineville, New South Wales. She was the first of three children born to Florence Mary (née Munroe) and Benjamin Montague Centennial Lewis. Her mother had been a milliner prior to her marriage, while her father, of English-Jewish and Polish-Jewish descent, worked as a signwriter.

Brown spent her early years in Erskineville and Newtown, where her father had established his own signwriting business after winning £5,000 (equivalent to $510,000 in 2022) on the lottery. He was an officeholder in the International Workers of the World (IWW) and had served time in gaol during World War I, later helping lobby for the release of the Sydney Twelve. Brown later recalled growing up in an "ordinary working-class family", with their house having no running water. During the Great Depression her father became unemployed and the family struggled financially, relying on sustenance payments. She and her siblings experienced significant poverty, having to wear rags and put paper soles in their shoes. According to her biographer, "her early experiences of poverty, explained by her father to her and the boys as the outcomes of rampant capitalism, clearly shaped her political views for her whole life".

Brown received her early education at Newtown Public School. She went on to Ashfield Girls Intermediate High School before transferring to Sydney Girls High School in 1935. She was a prefect in 1936, but had health issues and was unable to complete her intermediate certificate, leaving school in mid-1937. Brown was unemployed for a period and then found casual work at the Henry Jones IXL factory. She later joined her father's signwriting business, which had recovered in the late 1930s, and attracted attention as one of the few female signwriters in the profession.

== Theatre work and early political involvement ==
In 1936, Brown became involved with the New Theatre, a left-wing community theatre in Newtown. She began as a ticket-seller and was appointed as the theatre's secretary in 1937. She also filled the roles of producer and publicity officer for periods. She made her stage debut the following year in a performance of Behind the Scenes (Stage Door), an original production. She later appeared in the anti-war dramas Where's That Bomb?, Bury the Dead, and Remember Pedrocito.

Brown joined the Communist Party of Australia in 1936. She later became a journalist working for the Radio Times, and then later for various Communist-affiliated trade union papers. She married Bill Brown, an electrician she met at the New Theatre, in 1943.

== Women's rights activism ==
After the Second World War, Brown joined the New Housewives Association, later known as Union of Australian Women, and ultimately became its president. She was instrumental in the United Nations' celebration of International Women's Year in 1975. She was active in the Women's International Democratic Federation (WIDF), being elected president of the organisation in 1975, a position she held until 1991.

== Communist Party ==
Brown was a member of the Central Committee of the Communist Party of Australia from 1943 to 1971.

In 1971, Brown's husband Bill was expelled from the CPA as a member of a faction that remained loyal to the USSR after the 1968 invasion of Czechoslovakia, a move that the party had condemned. Bill and Freda then joined the Soviet-aligned Socialist Party.

== Later life and legacy ==
On 8 March 2004, International Women's Day, Brown, then 85, was honoured for her work against apartheid by the South African government in a ceremony in Johannesburg to mark the 10th anniversary of the end of Apartheid. Throughout the 1970s and 1980s, in her role as President of the WIDF, she had worked closely with the women's section of the African National Congress to bring South African women to Europe, North America and Australia to give testimony of conditions under Apartheid.
