= Baya Jurquet =

Franco-Algerian feminist activist

- Born: 9 April 1920; Algiers
- Died: 7 July 2007 (aged 87); Marseille

Baya Jurquet (born 9 April 1920 in Algiers, Algeria – died in Marseille) was an antiracist and anti-colonial activist and feminist. She worked for the emancipation of women in Algeria. She advocated for the defence and promotion of the right to self-determination and against colonialism in Algeria.

== Biography ==
=== Early life ===
Born in 1920 in Algeria at the time when it was still a colony, she therefore had French nationality obtained by her father as a wounded veteran of World War I. Due to the perseverance of her father she schooled at the French school until she was 11 years old, at 14 she was married to her cousin who was 4 years older, under a customary arrangement where she acquired the name Baya Allaouchiche. She had three children in the marriage, of which one died at an early age. Her first struggle as a woman was to end a marriage she was forced into. After the struggles of her early life, she led activism about the gender inequalities at the time and for the independence of Algeria and for a more equitable world through her communist values.

=== Career ===
She was a member of the central committee of the Algerian Communist Party (PCA) clandestine, which advocated for the right of Algerian women and their independence. She was also the secretary of the Women's Union of Algeria where she represented her country at numerous international conferences of communist women. She served as an elected member of the executive board of the Women's International Democratic Federation, beginning in 1953. She participated in anti-fascist fight after the landing in North Africa. During the national liberation revolution of the Algerian people, in 1955, she organized demonstrations of women prisoners and was later imprisoned in France in 1956. In 1956 in Geneva, the French authorities forbid her to return to Algiers. She then settled in Marseille but she did not give up the struggle for independent Algeria, especially by serving as a relay to the FLN and support for French militants committed alongside Algerian fighters.

In 1959 she met the founder of the Marxist-Leninist Communist Party of France, Jacques Jurquet, who was also an anti-colonialist and anti-racist, who would later become his companion.

She worked on the destruction of slums and the defence of Marseille's immigrants against the National Front. During the Algerian civil war of the 1990s, she organized reception structures in Marseilles for communist orphans. She was elected general secretary of the Union of Algerian women in 1949 and member of the central committee of the Algerian Communist Party (PCA), which mobilizes various audiences in Kabyle, Arabic, and French, it remains in contact with the FLN.

== Bibliography ==
- Algerian women: from the Kahina to the Family Code / Baya Jurquet-Bouhoune, Jacques Jurquet. - Le Temps des Cerises. This book highlights committed and irreducible women and challenges the Family Code, this text degrading women that was adopted in 1984, it led to a step backwards on their rights: "under cover of tradition, and even religion, we infantilize half of an entire people. " (she writes on page 12).

- Oued in flood, or the life of an Algerian mother, Baya Jurquet-Bouhoune. This second work, is written with her husband, Jacques, the book tells the poignant story of the Zerrouk family destroyed by the French colonists, the family has nothing to eat, the father is unemployed and the son is killed at the war. The story recounts the murderous attitudes of French settlers during the period from 1940 to 1960. This novel also breathes life into the commitment of women against enslavement and servility, for their liberation. It relates the positions of Algerian women against the confinement of archaic traditions which despise women. She pays tribute to women like Djamila Bouhired, The Kahina or Cherifa Kheddar.
