= Union of Luxembourg Women =

The Union of Luxembourg Women (French: Union des Femmes Luxembourgeoises, UFL) is a non-profit association which was created following the Liberation of Luxembourg during World War II. It is affiliated with the Women's International Democratic Federation created in 1945.

== History ==
At the instigation of the Communist Party of Luxembourg, the association was established on 25 February 1945, at the first meeting of the organization's provisional committee, consisting of Catherine Balter, Bernard Lemmer, Fritz Schneider and Claire Urbany-Feltgen, who became the organization's president.

Founded by women who had returned from concentration camps or from exile, the non-partisan union initially aimed to improve the status of women in society, to fight for peace and to work towards social justice.

The UFL is affiliated with the Women's International Democratic Federation, established in 1945, which also works towards world peace and improvement of the status of women. Since 1975, it has also been a member of the Conseil national des Femmes du Luxembourg.

== Activities ==
The UFL has participated in numerous social activities in Luxembourg. As it opposed the Vietnam War, it set out to help the wounded and their families. In April 1973 it arranged the first of many Vietnam Basars which provided funds for constructing a medical centre for the protection of women and children in Hanoi.

It has also contributed to defending the rights of Luxembourg women. In 1983, together with other women's associations, using the slogan "Rechent mat de Fraen! – Neen zur Austeritéit!" (Count on women. No to austerity), it demanded a fair salary for women who do the same work as men and an adequate number of daycare centres. The Union also supports the children's village in Mersch, covering the educational expenses of two children.
