= Márcia Campos =

Márcia de Campos Pereira is a Brazilian activist who since the 1970s has fought for improvements in citizen's democratic rights, especially those for women. In particular, she helped to organize the Brazilian Democratic Movement, including its women's branch, and has participated in various Brazilian unions and women's organizations. In 2008, she became a member of the Conselho Nacional dos Direitos da Mulher (National Council of Women's Rights). At its 2007 Beirut congress, the Women's International Democratic Federation (WIDF) elected Campos as its president. She was re-elected WIDF president at the 2007 Caracas congress in 2007 and again at the 2012 congress in Brasilia.

== Biography ==
Campos is remembered for efforts in favour of the democratization of Brazil. While a student, she participated in democratic activities to improve conditions for education, women, young people and workers. In the 1970s, she travelled across the country, supporting women's associations and their efforts in trade unions. She was also an active participant in the Women's Amnesty Movement (Movimento Feminino pela Anistia).

By 1980, she had moved from Rio de Janeiro to São Paulo where she founded and headed the São Paulo Women's Federation (Federação das Mulheres Paulistas, FMP). In 1981, she went on to found the Confederation of Brazilian Women (Confederação das Mulheres do Brasil, CMB) designed to improve women's living and working conditions in various states. From 1988, she supported efforts to develop housing for single mothers in a number of cities. She became a member of the political party Brazilian Democratic Movement (Movimento Democrático Brasileiro, MDB) and its women's group but later, in 2011, joined the newly established Free Fatherland Party (Partido Pátria Livre, PPL). From 2008, she served on the Conselho Nacional dos Diretos da Mulher (National Council of Women's Rights.

In 2002, at the Beirut congress of the Women's International Democratic Federation she was elected president of the organization. She was re-elected president at the 2007 WIDF congress in Caracas and again at the 2012 congress in Brasilia. Campos also represents the WIDF on the United Nations Economic and Social Council.

As acting national secretary of the Communist Party of Brazil, Campos was a leading instigator of "Mulheres Juntas Pelo Brasil" (Women Together For Brazil), calling on women across the country to come out on the streets on 13 August 2022 to fight against hunger, poverty, and inequality between men and women. At a time when the country was facing an economic crisis, she called for action, explaining: "What is really important and brings us together, what drives our hearts out onto the streets on the 13th, is to follow, expand and become part of the civic journey now in full progress in our country. What we want for our families and people are Brazilian women to build the country."
