= National Council of Women (Romania) =

The National Council of Women or Consiliul Național al Femeilor (CNF) was a Romanian women's organization. Active as the CNF from 1958 to 1989, it was the longest-running women's organization in the Socialist Republic of Romania.

== History ==
The Union of Antifascist Women of Romania (Uniunea Femeilor Antifasciste din România), also known as the Union of Democratic Women of Romania (Uniunea Femeilor Democrate din România), was founded in 1944 a state women's organization in Communist Romania.

It was a state organization and a branch of the Romanian Communist Party (PCR). Its purpose was to mobilise women in the political ideology of the state, as well as to enforce the party's policy within gender roles and women's rights. It played an important role in the life of women in the state during its existence. From 1958 its role was played by the CNF.

Between 1945 and 1965, the women's organization focused on providing political and professional training to women of the working class, particularly rural peasant women. The CNF aimed to instruct women in the political ideology of the ruling party as well as to raise the production level by activating them in the work force by offering education and professional training. Already working women were offered courses to make them even more effective. The CNF also eradicate illiteracy by offering reading courses. The political instruction and professional training was given in parallel.

During the Ceaușescu regime (1965-1989), the CNF expanded to include focus on all women in society and incorporate them in ideological mass mobilization. During this period, the party focused heavily in an official rhetoric of gender equality. Women were encouraged to engage in politics, educate themselves, work and hade a political as well as a professional career, and seek promotion to local political office. Commissions was organized to assist women in advancing in to positions in political levels and professions were the gender balance was uneven. However, the Decree 770, introduced in 1967, which banned abortion and made contraception hard to attain, made the official policy of women's equality difficult to achieve in practice.
