= Eva Priester =

Austrian journalist, poet

Eva Priester, née Eva Beatrice Feinstein, (1910 – 1982) was a Russian-born Austrian journalist, poet and socialist activist. After spending periods in Berlin, Vienna and Prague, in 1939 she emigrated to the United Kingdom where, while working for the BBC, she joined London's Austrian Centre and the Free Austrian Movement. During this period, she edited and published poetry in the wartime journal Zeitspiegel, including some of her own works. In 1946, Priester returned to Austria where she joined the Communist Party (KPÔ), edited its journal Die Woche and contributed to Ôsterreichische Volksstimme. She also published several books including a Marxist-oriented history of Austria titled Kurze Geschichte Ôsterreichs (1946). In 1951, she was a member of the group of activists who, on behalf of the Women's International Democratic Federation, visited Korea to examine conditions during the Korean War.

== Early life ==
Born on 15 July 1910 in Saint Petersburg, Eva Beatrice Feinstein was the daughter of Salomon Feinstein, a highly qualified technician, and his wife Ljuba, née Wolpe, who had studied at the Sorbonne. An only child, Eva was brought up in a secular Jewish family in a well-to-do district of the city. She was tutored at home, learning German from a governess from Cologne from the age of seven.

As conditions worsened in Saint Petersburg, the family moved to Berlin where Eva was first tutored at home and then attended the state high school Cecilien-Lyzeum in Lichtenberg until 1921.

== Career ==
On leaving school, Eva Feinstein began to work, initially on a voluntary basis, as a journalist for the Berliner Tageblatt. When she was 19, she married the paper's business editor Hans Erich Priester, who was also a competent speculator. By 1935, they had separated. Recognizing the anti-Jewish stand of the National Socialists, Eva became attached to the youth wing of the Communist Party of Germany in 1933. For her political activities, she was imprisoned for a time, but then fled first to Czechoslovakia and in 1936 to Austria. Working in Vienna as a journalist, she joined the Communist Party (KPÖ) and associated with the writers Jura Sovfer and Jenö Kostmann.

After returning to Prague in 1938, in May 1939 she moved to London where she soon joined other exiled members of the KPÔ. After joining the BBC's German monitoring service from spring 1940, in late 1941 she worked for the Free Austrian Movement and edited the Zeitspiegel, frequently contributing her own poetry.

In the spring of 1944, Priester returned to Austria where she joined the KPÔ and became editor-in-chief of the party's journal Die Woche. From 1949, she edited the Austrian Volksstimme. In 1951, she was a member of the group of activists who, on behalf of the Women's International Democratic Federation, visited Korea to examine conditions during the Korean War.

Eva Priester died in Moscow on 15 August 1982 while visiting a health spa.

== Contributions as a writer ==
Priester's poetry, especially the verses she wrote while in exile in Czechoslovakia and London, has recently received attention. Some of her poems were first published by Free Austrian Books or the newspaper Zeitspiegel in London but most were later republished in 1946 by Globus Verlag, Vienna, in the collection Aus Krieg und Nachkrieg. Gedichte und Ûbertragungen. She is also considered to have been a highly competent translator of verse.

She is remembered in Austria for her Kurze Geschichte Ôsterreichs (Short History of Austria), a two-volume Marxist-oriented account of Austrian history which she had started writing while in London.
