= Lorena Peña =

Salvadoran politician and women's rights advocate

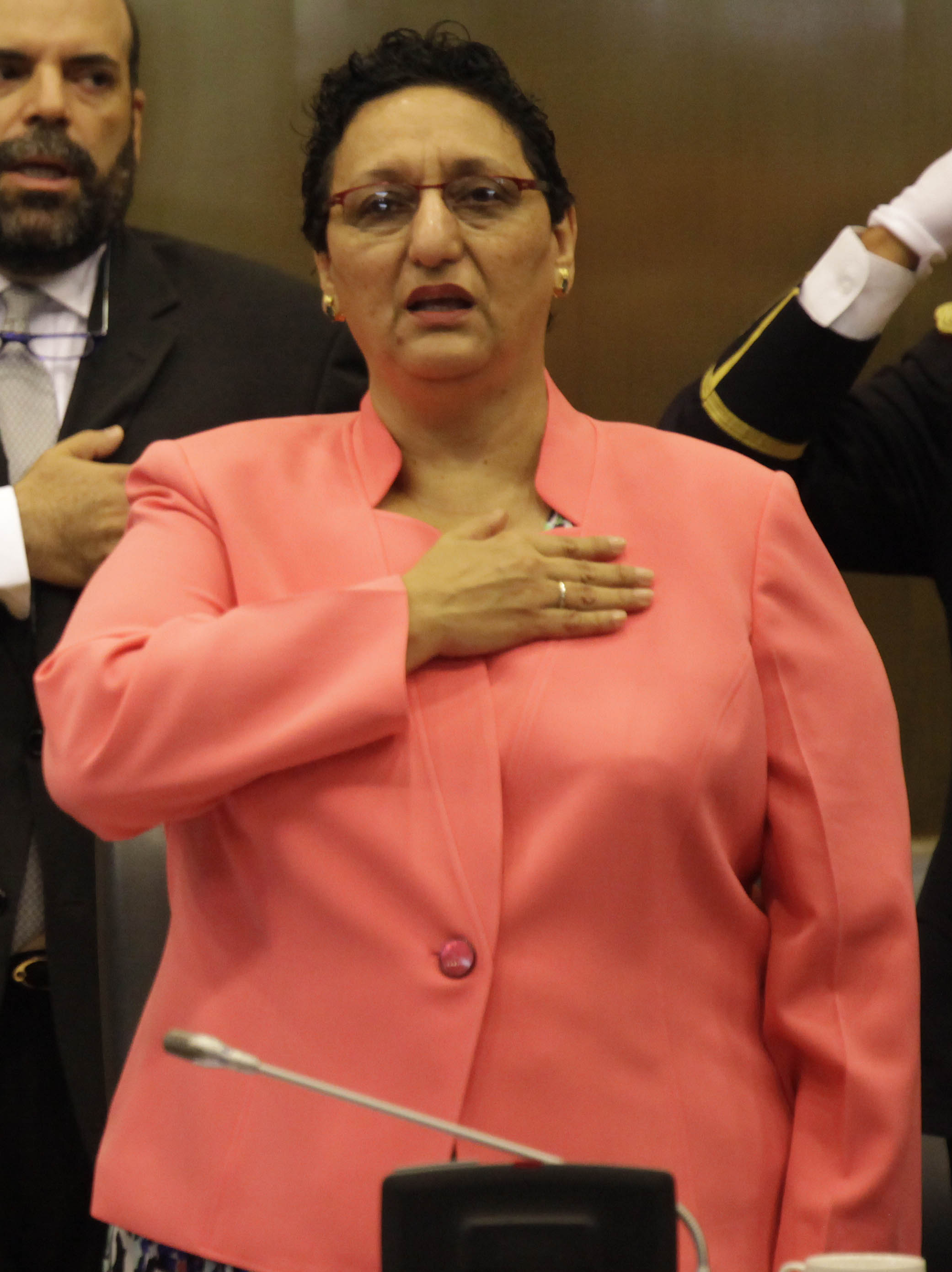
Lorena Peña (2015)

Lorena Guadalupe Peña Mendoza, also known as Nadia Palacios and Rebeca Palacios, (born 1955) is a Salvadoran economist, former guerilla and politician. Representing the Farabundo Martí National Liberation Front (FMLN), from May 2015 to November 2016, she was the third woman to serve as President of the Legislative Assembly of El Salvador. As of November 2023, she continues to serve as president of the Women's International Democratic Federation, following her election in September 2016 at the organization's congress in Bogotá. In March 2023, the fiscal Salvadoran authorities brought a case against her for corruption.

== Early life, education and family ==
Born in San Salvador on 20 December 1955, Lorena Guadalupe Peña Mendoza was the daughter of José Belisario Peña and Ángela Mendoza. One of the family's five children and their youngest daughter, she attended a secular primary school and a Catholic secondary school. In 1974, she married Hernán Solórzano with whom she had one son, Vladimir. In 1987, she gave birth to a daughter, Ana Vírginia.

== Career ==
In 1973, as a student at the University of El Salvador, she worked as a cashier and joined the city's clandestine guerillas. In 1979, she travelled to Beirut to obtain arms from the PLO. Adopting the pseudonym Nadia Palacios, in 1980 as the Salvadoran Civil War intensified, attracting large numbers of students and workers, together with her three brothers she manned a command post in the west of the country. After receiving increasing responsibility over the years, in 1990 she was appointed a member of the FMLN's diplomatic mission and took part in the peace negotiations which led to the Chapultepec Peace Accords in 1992.

From 14 May 2015 to 7 November 2016, she was the third woman to serve as president of the Legislative Assembly of El Salvador and in 2016 she was unanimously elected president of the Women's International Democratic Federation at their congress in Bogotá. During her time as Legislative Assembly president, the Legislative Assembly of El Salvador voted on 26 November 2015 to approve the accession to the Rome Statute of the International Criminal Court (ICC). In October 2016, Peña introduced made a bill in the Legislative Assembly calling for an end to the El Salvador's absolute ban on abortion and decriminalize abortion under certain circumstances.

In March 2023, the Salvadoran tax authorities initiated a civil case against Lorena Peña, accusing her of corruption. They maintain she and her daughter took 277,482.54 dollars of state funds for their own benefit.

== Publications ==
Under the pen name Rebeca Palacios, in 2009 Lorena Peña published Retazos de mi vida (Segments of My Life), an account of the part she played in the civil war.
