= Fuki Kushida =

Japanese activist (1899–2001)

Fuki Kushida (櫛田 ふき, Kushida Fuki; February 17, 1899 – February 5, 2001) was a Japanese peace and women's rights activist.

== Early life ==
Kushida was born in Yamaguchi prefecture on February 17, 1899. Her father was a professor at the Tokyo School of Foreign Languages. She briefly attended the Japan Women's University, but left school to marry Tamizo Kushida, an economist. After his death in 1934, Kushida sold insurance and became a magazine reporter to support their two children.

== Career ==
After getting to know people like Yuriko Miyamoto, Shigeji Tsuboi, and Sakae Tsuboi in 1946, Kushida joined the Women's Democratic Club and became their first Secretary General. In 1958, Kushida was elected the president of the Federation of Japanese Women's Organizations.

In the 1990s, Kushida began protesting United States military bases in Japan. This was because of crimes committed by service members against Japanese women near the bases. She advocated for the removal of all foreign military bases, most notably in Okinawa. In 2000, Kushida led a march in Ginza protesting an agreement to increase military ties between Japan and the United States. She led the march from a wheelchair because of her age.

== Selected bibliography ==
- たくさんの足音 そのなかの一つが歩いた道. Tokyo: 新読書社. 1965.
- 愛と希望の星みつめて. Tokyo: 新日本出版社. 1988. ISBN 9784406016087.
- 八度めの年おんな. 岩波書店. 1995. ISBN 9784000029650.
- 二〇世紀をまるごと生きて. Tokyo: 日本評論社. 1998. ISBN 9784535582415.
