= Angiola Minella =

Italian politician (1920–1988)

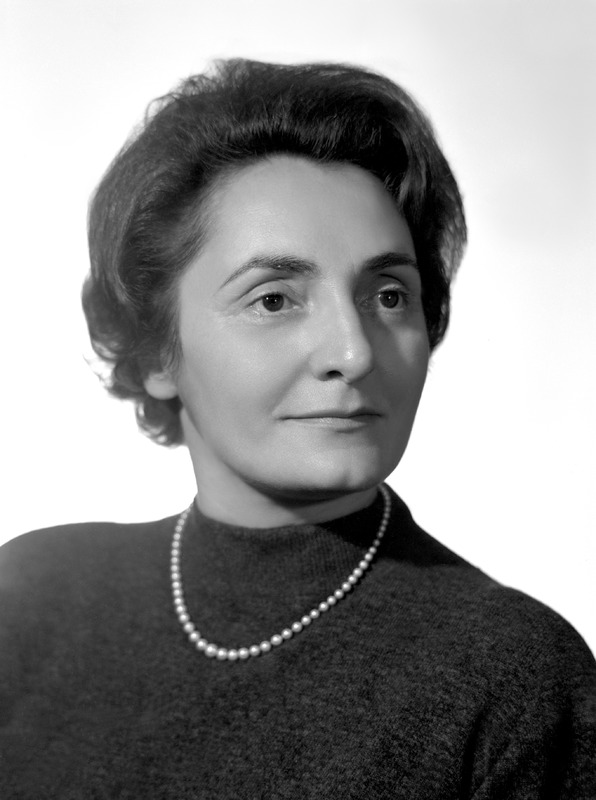
- Official portrait, 1963

Member of the Senate
- In office 1963–1972

Member of the Chamber of Deputies
- In office 1948–1953
- In office 1958–1963

Member of the Constituent Assembly
- In office 1946–1948

Personal details
- Born: 3 February 1920 Turin, Kingdom of Italy
- Died: 12 March 1988 (aged 68) Turin, Italy
- Spouse: Piero Molinari (m. 1945)
- Children: 1
- Education: Liceo Classico Massimo d'Azeglio
- Occupation: Partisan; politician
- Profession: Nurse

Angiola Minella Molinari (née Minella; 3 February 1920 – 12 March 1988) was an Italian politician. She was elected to the Constituent Assembly in 1946 as one of the first groups of women parliamentarians in Italy. She subsequently served for two non-consecutive terms in the Chamber of Deputies and two in the Senate.

== Biography ==
Minella was born in Turin in 1920. When she was 12, her father Mario was murdered by fascists. She attended the Liceo Classico Massimo d'Azeglio, where she was a classmate of Gianni Agnelli, and subsequently began studying literature at university. Following the outbreak of World War II, she trained to be a nurse in the Red Cross and worked in a hospital in Bra. She joined the Italian resistance movement in 1944, initially with the Badogliani and then the Brigate Garibaldi.

Following the war, Minella became active in the Savona branch of the Italian Communist Party, in which she met Piero Molinari, whom she went on to marry, contrary to the advice of her mother. She was elected to the municipal council of Savona in the March 1946 local elections and was subsequently a PCI candidate in the June 1946 general elections, in which she was one of 21 women elected to the Constituent Assembly. She was elected to the Chamber of Deputies in 1948 and had a daughter, Laura, in 1950. After losing her seat in the 1953 elections, she became the Italian representative at the Women's International Democratic Federation in East Berlin, serving as its secretary general from 1955.

Minella returned to Italy in 1957 and was elected back to the Chamber of Deputies in the 1958 elections. She was subsequently elected to the Senate in 1963 and re-elected in 1968, serving until 1972. She died in Turin in 1988.
