= Democratic Association of Hungarian Women =

State women's organization

The Democratic Association of Hungarian Women (Hungarian: Magyar Nők Demokratikus Szövetsége or MNDSZ), was a state women's organization in Communist Hungary, founded in 1945.

== History ==
It was a state organization and a branch of the Communist Party, the Hungarian Working People's Party. It was formally dissolved in 1956, but was refounded under a new name and continued to function until 1989.

Its purpose was to mobilise women in the political ideology of the state, as well as to enforce the party's policy within gender roles and women's rights. The party policy of women's rights were progressive during the Communist regime; discrimination based on gender was prohibited, full legal equality was secured, and it was a part of the task of the organization to address all gender discrimination. It played an important role in the life of women in the state during its existence.
