= Vivian Carter Mason =

American civil rights activist

- Born: Vivian Carter; February 10, 1900; Wilkes-Barre, Pennsylvania, US
- Died: May 10, 1982 (aged 82); Norfolk, Virginia, US
- Education: University of Chicago
- Occupation: Civil rights activist
- Spouse: William T. Mason

Vivian Carter Mason (born Vivian Carter; February 10, 1900 – May 10, 1982) was an American advocate for women's and civil rights as well as an ardent supporter of universal education. She served as an influential president of the National Council of Negro Women (NCNW) from 1953 to 1957. She is well known for founding the Women's Council for Interracial Cooperation in communities such as Norfolk and Arlington, Virginia, in 1945. Mason also founded the Committee of 100 Women, which allowed for underprivileged children of color in New York City to attend summer camp for free.

== Early life ==
Mason was one of eight children born to George Carter, a Methodist minister, and Florence William Carter, a music teacher, in Wilkes-Barre, Pennsylvania. She was inspired at an early age by her mother's advocacy of women's rights and her father's moral and spiritual values. She noted in an interview in 1978 that she knew at a very early age that her family, "did not have a large income," but that they "were happy."

=== Education ===
Mason moved to Auburn, New York, during her childhood and attended public schools in the area before attending college at the University of Chicago in 1925 where she studied political economy and social welfare. She later took classes at New York University and Fordham University.

While at the University of Chicago, she met her husband, William T. Mason of Trinidad, West Indies. Her husband was a successful real estate agent and businessman. They wed in Brooklyn and bore a son named William T. Mason Jr. in Norfolk, Virginia. In 1931, Mason moved with her son to New York City.

== Career ==
Mason's professional life began when she took the job as the program director of the Young Women's Christian Association (YWCA) in Brooklyn, New York. After leaving her position at YWCA, she accepted the position of administrator of the city's Department of Welfare . Mason was the first black woman to ever hold this position. She remained a national board member at the YWCA. Mason founded the National Committee of 100 women which serves as a free summer camp for underprivileged children.

=== National Council of Negro Women (NCNW) ===
On April 17, 1945, Mason jumpstarted the Women's Council for Interracial Cooperation (WCIC). This group represented females from all different racial backgrounds and ethnicities. In 1945, Mason was chosen to represent the National Council of Negro Women (NCNW) at the first meeting of the International Women's Democratic Federation in Paris, France. She served on the board of the federation and served as vice president for the American affiliate.

After moving to Norfolk, Virginia In the mid-1940s she was nominated president of the Norfolk Council of Negro Women (NCNW). She served for 4 years before being elected to the position of president of the National NCNW in 1953. She served until 1957. In 1968, Mason was the only black woman on Virginia's Democratic Central Committee. In 1971, she was appointed as the first black woman on the board of the Norfolk city school district and was named "Newsmaker of 1971" by the Virginia Pres. By 1978, she founded the local chapter of the National Urban League.

== Legacy ==
Mason is remembered as a leader of the feminist movement, civil rights movement, and labor movement during the 20th century. She changed the NCNW by creating more structure and order in order to successfully generate change. Throughout her life, she served on many boards concentrated in New York and Norfolk, Virginia. She was determined in changing her community to promote unity amongst people of both sexes and all races. She made history by becoming the first black woman leader of more than one organization.

Vivian Mason Carter died May 10, 1982, in Norfolk, Virginia.
