= Yvonne Useldinger =

Luxembourgish politician

Yvonne Useldinger (née Hostert; 6 November 1921 – 11 February 2009) was a Luxembourgish politician.

== Life ==
Yvonne Hostert was born in Differdange, and became in 1937 a member of the Young Socialists. In 1938 she joined the Communist Party of Luxembourg. In 1940 she married Arthur Useldinger, a senior figure in the Communist Party. In 1941 she was arrested by the Gestapo, but was released due to a lack of evidence against her. A year later, by which time she had become pregnant, she was arrested again, with her parents and brother. Her daughter, Fernande, was born in a jail in Trier. In late June 1943 she was deported to Ravensbrück concentration camp, where she later became a member of an illegal underground organisation.

Her father was deported first to Hinzert concentration camp, later to Mauthausen; her brother was sent to Dachau. Her mother was released, and took care of Yvonne's baby.

Yvonne Useldinger was transferred in December 1944 from Ravensbrück camp to a secondary camp, which had been built nearby by Siemens. After Ravensbrück was liberated by the Red Army, Useldinger was in late April 1945 evacuated to Sweden by the Swedish Red Cross. Shortly after, she returned to Luxembourg.

In 1945 she co-founded the Union des Femmes Luxembourgeoises (UFL), of which she later became the president.

Her diary is one of the few documents that survive from Ravensbrück camp.
