= Elena Gatti Caporaso =

Italian politician

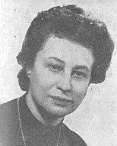

Member of the Senate of the Republic
- In office 1969–1972
- Parliamentary group: Socialist
- Constituency: Lombardy

Member of the Chamber of Deputies
- In office 1953–1958
- Parliamentary group: Socialist
- Constituency: Pisa

Personal details
- Party: PSI
- Occupation: Lawyer, civil servant

Elena Gatti Caporaso (2 March 1918 – 13 September 1999) was an Italian socialist politician and feminist.

== Political career ==
She joined the Italian Socialist Party and played an important leadership role from 1949, as well as militating for civil rights as a member of the Unione donne italiane along with her friend Giuliana Nenni. In 1954, at the National Conference of Socialist Women, she defined emancipation as an issue common to all women, cutting across class lines.
