= Mitra Mitrović =

Minister of Education in the Federal People's Republic of Yugoslavia
- In office 1945–1948

Personal details
- Born: 6 September 1912 Požega
- Died: 4 April 2001 (aged 88) Belgrade, Serbia
- Party: Communist Party of Yugoslavia
- Spouse: Milovan Đilas (m. 1936, div. 1952)
- Education: University of Belgrade

Mitra Mitrović (Serbian: Митра Митровић; 6 September 1912 – 4 April 2001) was a Serbian politician, anti-fascist, feminist and writer. She was Minister of Education in the government of the People's Republic of Serbia.

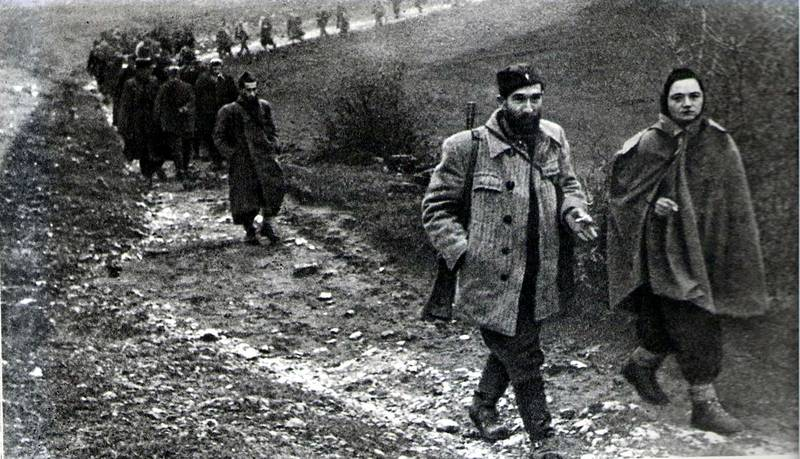
Mitra Mitrović on the far right of the image

== Biography ==
The daughter of a railway official, she was born in Požega. Her father died of typhus during World War I and her mother was left to raise the five children. With the help of a scholarship, Mitrović was able to study at the University of Belgrade Faculty of Philosophy, earning a degree in Serbo-Croatian language and literature in 1934. In 1933, she joined the Communist Party of Yugoslavia. She was arrested several times and, as an anti-fascist, was imprisoned following the German occupation of Serbia but managed to escape.

She was a delegate to the Anti-Fascist Council for the National Liberation of Yugoslavia (AVNOJ). She was an editor of Borba, the Communist Party newspaper. She was a founding member of the Antifascist front of women (AFŽ) and served on its central committee. She helped found the feminist newspaper Žena danas ("Woman today").

She served as a member of the Serbian National Assembly and of the federal assembly for the Socialist Federal Republic of Yugoslavia.

Mitrović was Minister of Education in the government of the People's Republic of Serbia from 1945–1948. Later, she served as president of the Council for Education and Culture.

She married Milovan Đilas in 1936; the couple divorced in 1952. Even though she was no longer married to Đilas, when he fell out of favor, she was removed from all her political posts in 1954.

She published a memoir Ratno putovanje as well as books in support of women's rights: Pravo glasa žena dokaz i oruđe demokratije and Položaj žene u savremenom svetu.

Mitrović died in Belgrade at the age of 88.
