= Anežka Hodinová-Spurná =

Czech politician (1895–1963)

Anežka Hodinová-Spurná (née Zavadilová; 12 January 1895 – 1 April 1963) was a Czech politician. She was a co-founder of the Communist Party of Czechoslovakia.

== Biography ==
Anežka Zavadilová was born in Doubravice on 12 January 1895. She was born into a poor cooper's family. After the First Czechoslovak Republic was established in 1918, she became member of the Czechoslovak Social Democratic Workers' Party. The Communist Party of Czechoslovakia split off from it in 1921 and Zavadilová became one of the most active co-founders of the new party. In 1922, she married Karel Hodina.

In the parliamentary elections of 1929, she became a member of the National Assembly of Czechoslovakia. She retained this position in subsequent elections until 1938, when the Communist Party of Czechoslovakia was dissolved. In the meantime, she divorced and already in 1932 married the communist journalist Jindřich Spurný. Since then, she used the surname Hodinová-Spurná.

In 1945, Hodinová-Spurná became a member of the Central Committee of the Communist Party and in 1945–1960 she was a deputy in National Assembly of Czechoslovakia. She was appointed Deputy Chairman of the National Assembly of Czechoslovakia in 1948. She died in Prague on 1 April 1963, at the age of 68.
