= Nora Rodd =

Canadian peace activist

- Born: Nora Kathleen Corman; 22 August 1893; St. Thomas, Ontario, Canada
- Died: 25 May 1994 (age 100); Windsor, Ontario, Canada
- Occupation(s): Activist, lecturer

Nora Rodd (22 August 1893 – 25 May 1994) was a Canadian peace activist, feminist, and communist. In 1951, she led a delegation from the Women's International Democratic Federation, investigating war crimes in Korea.

== Early life and education ==
Nora Kathleen Corman was born in St. Thomas, Ontario, the daughter of Frank Lee Corman and Ida Belle Jones Corman.

== Career ==
In the 1930s, Rodd and her husband campaigned for the Co-operative Commonwealth Federation, then a new political party in Canada. In 1951, Rodd led an international delegation of 21 women from the Women's International Democratic Federation on a controversial study mission to North Korea. Canadian newspapers quoted her as saying in Pyongyang that "if I were young and free, I should want to stay in Korea and help you build your country up again." The Canadian House of Commons considered whether Rodd had committed treason by making a broadcast in support of North Korea during the Korean War. The delegation's report was dismissed by many as Communist propaganda, but historical reconsiderations have since validated some of the report's findings.

As a member of the British Columbian Peace Council and the National Council of the Congress of Canadian Women, Rodd lectured to women's organizations across Canada in the 1950s and 1960s, on anti-imperialism, peace, and women's rights. "Women must live for their communities as well as for their homes", she told a Nanaimo audience in 1954. She continued actively campaigning and organizing through the 1970s, and into the 1980s.

== Personal life ==
Corman married lawyer and prohibitionist leader Roscoe Sherman Rodd in 1919. They had three children, Helen (1920–2016), Philip (1925–1998), and Stephen (1928–2012). Her husband died in 1960. She died in 1994, at the age of 100.
