= Teresa Andrés Zamora =

Spanish librarian

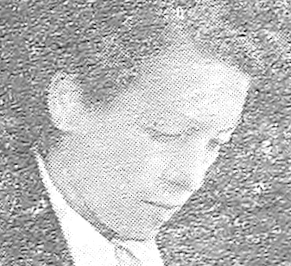
Teresa Andrés Zamora

Teresa Andrés Zamora (1907–1946) was a Spanish librarian who led the Sección de Bibliotecas de Cultura Popular. She was a Valenician Ministry of Public Instruction delegate, communist militant, feminist, republican, and trade unionist. Andrés fled into exile, first to Belgium and later to France, where she remained involved in politics until her death on 5 July 1946 from leukaemia.

== Biography ==
Teresa Andrés Zamora was born in Villalba de los Alcores. She grew up in Cevico de la Torre, in the province of Palencia. Her siblings, four brothers (Troadio Félix, Dionisio, Mariano and Victoriano) and a sister (Isabel) were born in the same town.

Andrés studied for her bachelor's degree in Palencia, living in a flat rented with her grandmother, and matriculating with high honors. During the years 1923 to 1927, she studied Philosophy and Letters in Valladolid, while also studying additional subjects, such as pedagogy. In 1928, Andrés moved to the Residence of Misses in Madrid with the intention of working on a doctorate.

During her studies in 1928–29 and 1930–31, Andrés was a teacher at the Institute-School of Madrid, where she taught classes in geography. Here, Andrés became aware of the fight for women's rights. During the 1928–29 term, Clara Campoamor gave a conference speech titled "How Women Create Law". In 1928, she participated in the International Congress of University Women in Madrid. Included among the participants were representatives of the International Federation of University Women, some of which lodged in the same Pavilion as the Residence of Misses, where Andrés resided.

During her stay at the Residence, Andrés collaborated with the Institute's activities. One of which was a trip to Andalucia, during which she gave an art presentation in collaboration with the Centre of Historical Studies for the Missions of Art which was set up by the architect Pablo Gutiérrez. During the 1933–34 term, Andrés and Encarnación Cobré Herrero spoke at four conferences on prehistory and ironworking. She would use some of this conference work as the subject of her doctoral thesis. She continued working on her doctorate under the guidance of the man who would later become her husband Emili Gómez Nadal.

Library of Popular Culture

After examinations in 1931, she became the director of the Archaeologic Museum in León. In 1931, she was appointed as the director of the Archive of the National Palace, commissioned to organise and safeguard palace funds. The Board of Enlargement of Studies granted her a scholarship in 1932 for eleven months in Germany. There, she witnessed the ascension of Hitler. She took courses of medieval archaeology, German sculpture of the 14th century, and medieval painting, at the Institute of Art History at the University of Berlin. She also worked in several libraries and museums. She returned to Spain in September 1933 and furthered her doctoral thesis, "La rejería en España", under the direction of Gómez Moreno.

In 1935, she received two more scholarships, one in the Archaeology Department at the Centre of Historical Investigations for a study trip to research in the Cathedrals of Cuenca, Valencia, Barcelona and Saragossa. She received another scholarship in 1936. She died in Paris in 1946 at 39 years of age.
