= Eugenia Pragierowa =

Eugenia Pragierowa née Berke (14 July 1888 – 5 May 1964) was a lawyer, Polish socialist activist, feminist, and a politician representing the Polish Socialist Party and the Polish United Workers' Party and high ranking civil servant.

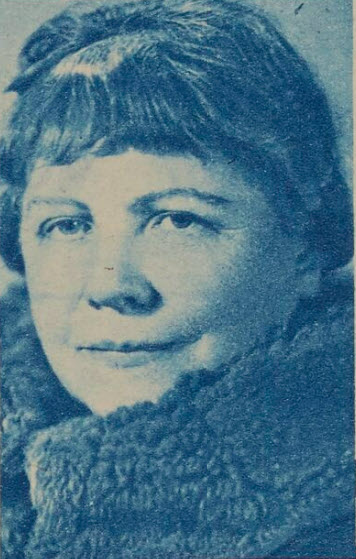
Eugenia Pragierowa (1952).

== Biography ==
=== Personal life ===
She studied at a female gymnasium in Kalisz. She was a participant in school strikes in 1905, arrested, and imprisoned for a total of seven months. She studied history at the Jagiellonian University, and in 1908–1911 law at the University of Zurich. She obtained a doctoral degree in law after defending her doctoral dissertation entitled Die Genossenschaftsbewegung im Königreich Polen (Cooperative Movement in the Kingdom of Poland). In the years 1910–1914 she was a member of the socialist PPS-Left, from 1919 a member of PPS, from 1919 to 1925, head of the Labour Protection Department of the Ministry of Labour and Social Welfare, and from 1925 to 1939 lecturer at the Free Polish University. In 1912 she had married Adam Pragier, an activist in the PPS, whose career she shadowed closely and who remained in British exile after 1945. After September 1939, the couple was effectively separated.

From 1945, he was the director of the department of the Ministry of Labour and Social Welfare, and then the Undersecretary of State at this ministry. In 1945–1947 she was a member of the Polish National Council. In 1946 she was awarded the Polonia Restituta, Commander's Cross.

In 1948 she became a member of the Central Audit Commission of the Polish United Workers' Party, and in 1948-1954 a member of the Central Committee of the party. She was vice-president of the Main Board of the League of Polish Women until 1964 and a delegate to the Women’s International Democratic Federation (WIDF), a socialist-feminist organization which was created in 1945 in Paris at the International Congress of Women.
