= Gene Weltfish =

American anthropologist and historian

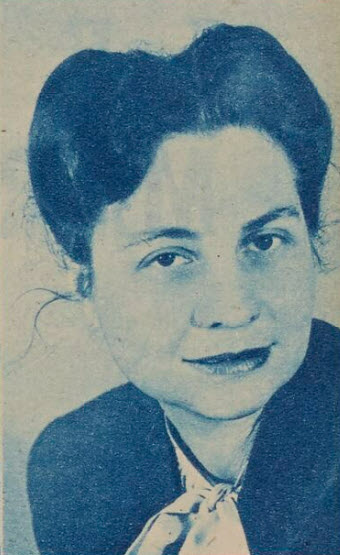
- Weltfish in 1952
- Born: Regina Weltfish; August 7, 1902; New York City, New York, U.S.
- Died: August 2, 1980 (aged 77); New York City, New York

Academic background
- Education: Hunter College; Barnard College (BA); Columbia University (PhD)
- Thesis: The Interrelation of Technique and Design in North American Basketry (1950)

Academic work
- Discipline: Anthropologist
- Institutions: Columbia University; Fairleigh Dickinson University
- Notable works: The Lost Universe: Pawnee Life and Culture

Gene Weltfish (born Regina Weltfish) (August 7, 1902 – August 2, 1980) was an American anthropologist and historian working at Columbia University from 1928 to 1953. She had studied with Franz Boas and was a specialist in the culture and history of the Pawnee people of the Midwest Plains. Her 1965 ethnography, The Lost Universe: Pawnee Life and Culture, is considered the authoritative work on Pawnee culture to this day.

She is also known for the 1943 pamphlet for the U.S. Army, called The Races of Mankind, which she co-wrote with Ruth Benedict. It was intended to educate military personnel about the cultural differences among the peoples of the world in preparation for their fighting with a variety of allies from other cultures. The authors stated that perceived differences between the races are cultural rather than biological. Among the data used in the text was an IQ study from World War I, which found higher scores among some northern Blacks in the United States forces than among some southern Whites. The pamphlet was not widely circulated within the Army, and by the early 1950s, it was banned as subversive.

Engaged in social activism during the 1940s, Weltflish attracted the attention of the FBI, which suspected her (and others on the Left) of being a communist. In 1952 and 1953 she was called to Congress for questioning by two of the Senate sub-committees dedicated to investigating "un-American activity" during the 1950s red scare. Two weeks before appearing at a 1953 hearing, in which she refused to answer questions from staffer attorney Roy Cohn and Senator Joseph McCarthy as to whether she was a communist, her 16-year appointment at Columbia was terminated. She was blacklisted and unable to find an academic position for nearly a decade. During her last decade in academia full-time, she taught at Fairleigh Dickinson University. She continued to teach part-time after retirement.

== Biography ==
Regina Weltfish was one of two daughters; she was born in 1902 into a German Jewish family in New York City's Lower East Side. She grew up speaking German as her first language, taught by a German governess hired by her grandfather. Her father, to whom she was very close, died when she was 13. Encouraged by her grandmother, she went to the synagogue daily to say the kaddish for him during the first year after his death, an honor and responsibility traditionally reserved for a son. Without a father, the family was in a difficult economic situation. Because her father had died without a will, the state managed his estate and kept it in trust. Weltfish's mother had to submit formal notarized petitions for every disbursement. To help the family, at 14 Weltfish started working as a school clerk and attended high school in the evenings.

=== Education ===
Graduating from Wadleigh High School for Girls in 1919, Weltfish entered Hunter College where she majored in journalism. She transferred to Columbia University's Barnard College, where she minored in philosophy under John Dewey. She graduated from Barnard in 1925 and enrolled in Columbia's graduate program in anthropology. She had already taken courses with Franz Boas during her senior year and continued to study with him as her adviser.

During this time, she married fellow graduate student Alexander Lesser, who also studied with Boas and became an anthropologist studying Siouan-speaking tribes. They were married for 15 years. Their daughter Ann was born in 1931. The two did their first field work together in Oklahoma, working on Siouan kinship systems.

Happening to meet Henry Moses, a Pawnee in New York, Weltfish decided to study his tribe as the subject of her dissertation. She traveled to the reservation in Oklahoma, where tribal members still mostly spoke Pawnee language. Weltfish had not previously studied that language but learned it during her years of studies. She focused on the study of aesthetics and craftsmanship, learning the art of basket-making, which was practiced exclusively by Pawnee women. Her doctoral dissertation from Columbia was titled The Interrelation of Technique and Design in North American Basketry. She completed her dissertation in 1929, but did not formally receive her Ph.D. until 1950. At that time Columbia modified its policy requiring that grad students pay to publish dissertations (at a cost of $4,000) and began accepting copies of mimeographed theses.

=== Career at Columbia University ===
In 1935 Weltfish was invited by Boas to teach at Columbia. She stayed on a year-to-year appointment until 1953. Among her students at Columbia were Eleanor Leacock and Vera Mae Green. Columbia University never granted Weltfish tenure, most likely because of a long-standing practice of discrimination against women. In 1938 Ruth Benedict was the first woman to achieve tenure at Columbia but did not receive a full professorship until 1948, months before her death. She intervened on behalf of Weltfish at a board meeting, when the trustees were considering terminating the younger woman's employment.

=== The Races of Mankind ===
One of Weltfish's minor works, co-written with Ruth Benedict, had a surprisingly great effect. Published in 1943, The Races of Mankind was a pamphlet intended for American troops. It set forth, in simple language with cartoon illustrations, the scientific case against racist beliefs. The publication of this pamphlet and the subsequent political furor that it caused during the 1950s, when it was decried as a piece of socialist propaganda, attracted the attention of anti-Communist authorities.

The authors recounted some results of IQ tests, which were first administered to the American Expeditionary Force (AEF) in World War I. At a time when whites generally believed they were mentally superior to blacks, "Southern Whites" scored below "Northern Negroes" in the IQ test. Weltfish and Benedict argued that "The difference....[arose] because of differences of income, education, cultural advantages, and other opportunities," since southern schools spent only a fraction of the amount spent on education in the North. This statement provoked outrage among some in the military, which had many Southerners as career officers and troops. Weltfish and Benedict devoted most of pamphlet to explaining that perceived differences in group mental abilities vary in accordance with social and cultural factors, not biological ones.

The pamphlet represented the Boasian way of thinking about race, which later became the standard view in anthropology and was endorsed with a 1948 UNESCO declaration. At the time, its contention that race was socially constructed was politically controversial, especially in the American South, where white Democrats had long maintained Jim Crow, racial segregation, disfranchisement of blacks, and white supremacy.

More than 20 years later, Weltfish explained why she wrote the pamphlet:

"During the first four years of my graduate training at Columbia, Hitler rose to power in Germany, bolstering his heinous operations with racist theories developed from distorted anthropology. The books of Franz Boas were burned in Germany. In 1942, after [Boas'] death, Ruth Benedict, my senior colleague in the Anthropology Department, and I felt that we should carry the banner on the race question. In 1943, Ruth Benedict and I collaborated on a pamphlet, "The Races of Mankind," published by the Public Affairs Committee. The pamphlet was originally written at the request of the U.S.O. for distribution to the men in the armed forces who had to fight side by side with allies such as the Huks in the Philippines and the Solomon Islanders. "The Races of Mankind" was used, not only for orientation by the army, but in the de-Nazification program in Germany after the war."

— (Memo by Weltfish, October 24, 1967, quoted in Pathe 1989:375)

Some far-right political groups in the US still consider Weltfish's work to be part of a conspiracy by Boas and his students to eliminate the study of race in psychology and anthropology in "preparation for the defeat of 'White Civilization' by the Jews".

=== Blacklisted during the McCarthy period ===
In 1953 Weltfish lost her position at Columbia University after 16 years of employment as an adjunct lecturer. The FBI had been interested in her political activities for some time, and in 1944 the head of the Anthropology department Ralph Linton, who had replaced Boas in 1937, reported her to the FBI for alleged communist sympathies. The FBI investigated Weltfish's activities, noting her political engagement in the Congress of American Women, her signatures on civil rights petitions, and her appearance on the radio station WNBC. The FBI had classified the Congress of American Women, of which Weltfish was once president, among subversive organizations in the 1940s after its spokeswomen criticized some of President Harry S. Truman's foreign policies.

In 1952 Weltfish was quoted in the Daily Worker as repeating a claim made by Soviet critics that the US Army had used germ warfare in the Korean War. Shortly thereafter she was subpoenaed to appear in the fall of 1952 before the McCarran Senate Judiciary Committee, where she was questioned. She refused to answer questions about her political affiliations, but when asked about the Daily Worker article, she said that she had been misquoted.

In 1953 Senator Joseph McCarthy's Senate Committee on Governmental Operations was conducting hearings to determine whether un-American literature was being purchased by American libraries. Weltfish was called in for questioning regarding her role in writing the pamphlet, The Races of Mankind, which the committee had declared to be subversive. Two weeks before she was scheduled to appear, Weltfish was told by the trustees of Columbia that her employment contract would not be renewed at the end of the year. The university said she was being dismissed based on the university's adoption of a new policy against the prolonged use of annual contract-based lecturers. But, the university promoted other lecturers affected by the change to tenured positions rather than dismissing them. Weltfish maintained that she was fired because she was a woman. Later historians have concluded that she was fired because the trustees saw her as a political liability, who could threaten funding, in the tense and charged environment during the years of the red scare.

On April 1, 1953, Weltfish was questioned by the United States Senate Subcommittee on Internal Security staffed by Roy Cohn and consisting of senators Joseph McCarthy, Karl Mundt, John McClellan and Stuart Symington. Weltfish responded negatively to the committee's demands that she name colleagues with communist sympathies. Asked about her own political position she refused to answer, invoking the Fifth Amendment. Weltfish simply said that "she thought of herself as a good American and acted on issues as her conscience and knowledge dictated". When asked about the nature of the claim made in the pamphlet that some northern blacks had scored higher on intelligence tests than southern whites, Weltfish responded that particular data set was from the US Army's records.

Having lost her employment at Columbia, Weltfish was effectively blacklisted and remained unable to find a teaching position for the next eight years. The Nebraska and Bollingen Foundations gave her some financial support, which allowed her to study museum materials from the Pawnee collection at the University of Nebraska. Based on this and her previous field work, she wrote The Lost Universe: Pawnee Life and Culture (1965) about Pawnee history and ethnography.

=== Later years ===
In 1961 Weltfish was hired at Fairleigh Dickinson University in New Jersey, where she worked until 1972, having reached the mandatory retirement age of 70. After her retirement from Fairleigh Dickinson, Weltfish continued teaching as a part-time faculty member at the New School for Social Research and Manhattan School of Music in New York City, and as a visiting professor at Rutgers University in New Brunswick, New Jersey. At Rutgers, she participated in a new program in gerontology. She died on August 7, 1980, just 5 days before her 78th birthday.

== Selected publications ==
- 1930a. "Prehistoric North American Basketry Techniques and Modern Distributions". American Anthropologist 32:454-495.
- 1930b. "Coiled Gambling Baskets of the Pawnee and Other Plains Tribes". Indian Notes and Monographs 7:277-295. Museum of the American Indian, Heye Foundation.
- 1931a. "Pottery Implements of the Ancient Basket-Makers". Plains Anthropologist 33:263.
- 1931b. "White-on-red Pottery from Cochiti Pueblo". Plains Anthropologist 33:263-264.
- 1932a. "Preliminary Classification of Prehistoric Southwestern Basketry". Smithsonian Miscellaneous Collections, Vol.87, No.6.
- 1932b. "Problems in the Study of Ancient and Modern Basket-Makers". American Anthropologist 34:108-117.
- 1932c. "Composition of the Caddoan Linguistic Stock". (Coauthor Alexander Lesser) Smithsonian Miscellaneous Collections, Vol.87, No.6.
- 1936. "The Vision of Fox Boy, a South Band Pawnee Text, with Translations and Grammatical Analysis". International Journal of American Linguistics 9:44-75.
- 1937. Caddoan Texts: Pawnee, South Band Dialect. Publication of the American Ethnological Society, Vol.17.
- 1943. The Races of Mankind. (Coauthor Ruth Benedict), The Public Affairs Committee, New York.
- 1953. The Origins of Art. Bobbs-Merrill, Indianapolis, Indiana.
- 1956. "The Perspective for Fundamental Research in Anthropology". The Philosophy of Science 23:63-73.
- 1958a. "The Linguistic Study of Material Culture", International Journal of American Linguistics 24:301-311.
- 1958b. "The Anthropologist and the Question of the Fifth Dimension", In Culture in History, edited by Stanley Diamond. Columbia University Press, New York.
- 1959. The Question of Ethnic Identity, an Ethnohistorical Approach. Ethnohistory 6:321-346.
- 1960. The Ethnic Dimension of Human History: Pattern or Patterns of Culture? in Selected Papers, Fifth International Congress of Anthropological and Ethnological Sciences, edited by Anthony C. Wallace. University of Pennsylvania Press, Philadelphia.
- 1965. The Lost Universe: Pawnee Life and Culture. Basic Books, New York.
- 1971. "The Plains Indians: Their Continuity in History and Their Indian Identity". In North American Indians in Historical Perspective, Edited by Eleanor Burke Leacock and Nancy Oestreich Lurie. Random House, New York.

== See also ==
- Eleanor Leacock
- Vera Mae Green
