= Kate Fleron =

Danish journalist, editor and writer

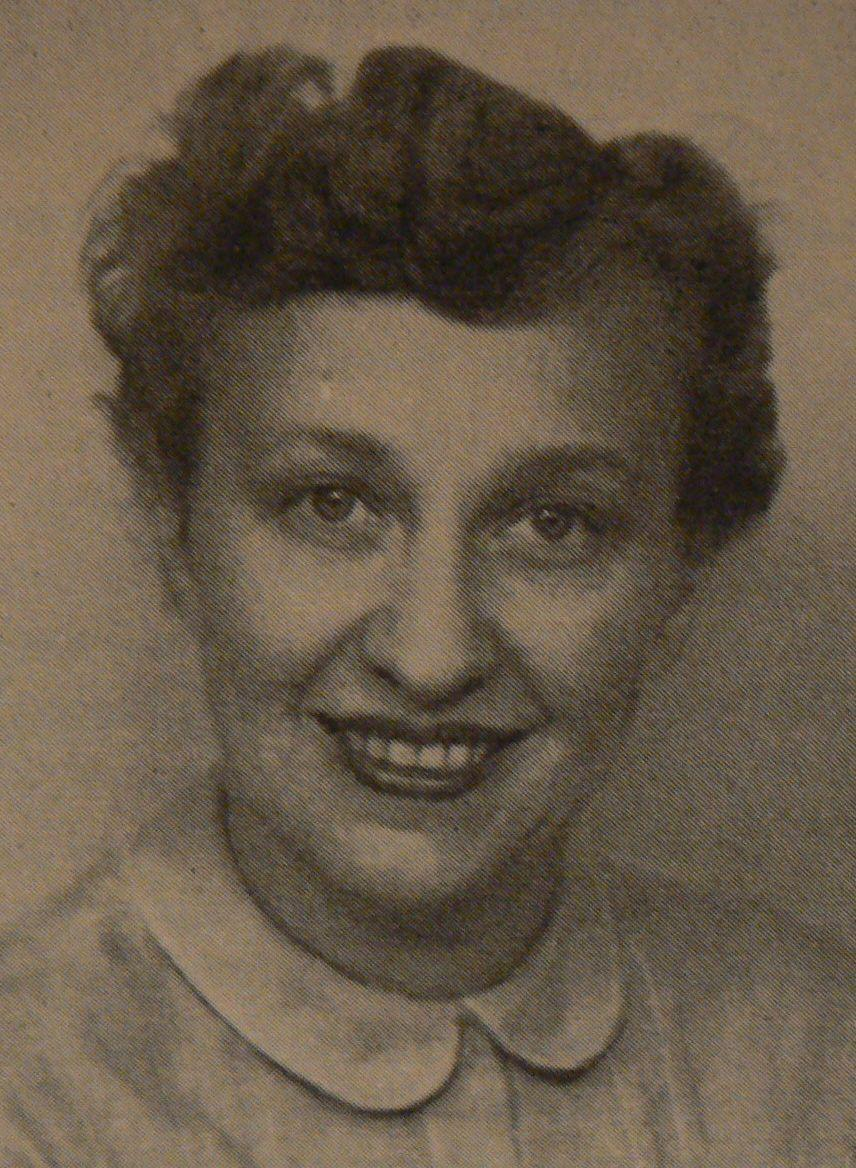
Kate Fleuron (1940s)

Kate Fleron Jacobsen (16 June 1909 – 5 March 2006) was a Danish journalist, editor and writer who, under the German occupation of Denmark in World War II, was a resistance fighter. A contributor to the clandestine paper Frit Danmark, she assisted key resistance members who worked underground. Arrested by the Gestapo in September 1944, she escaped from the Frøslev Prison Camp in April 1945, shortly before the Liberation of Denmark.

== Early life ==
Born on 16 June 1909 in Copenhagen, Kate Fleron was the daughter of Waldemar Frederik Ferdinand Fleron Jacobsen (1869–1934) and Nonny Margrethe Bauditz (1885–1957). She was brought up in a well-to-do home in the Frederiksberg district of Copenhagen where her parents allowed her considerable independence. Following in the footsteps of her maternal grandfather, the editor Ferdinand Bauditz, she decided from an early age that she would become a journalist.

== Career ==
On matriculating from Marie Kruse's School in 1928, she became an apprentice with Nordsjællands Venstreblad in Hillerød. In 1930, she joined the conservative paper Nationaltidende where she remained until 1942 when she was forced to leave for making unacceptable editorial changes. Working as a freelance journalist, she was successful in having her articles published in magazines. She published two books about young people, Afsporet Ungdom (1943) and Vi er Ungdommen (1943), presenting controversial views on sex and morals.

In December 1942, she was contacted by Ole Kiilerich, an earlier colleague who worked on the clandestine paper Frit Danmark (Free Denmark) Founded the previous April, it had become one of the country's leading anti-German publications. As several of those working on the paper had already been arrested and Kiilerich feared the same fate, he asked Fleron to take his place as a conservative contributor.

Her work consisted of assembling information and writing articles but, under the codename Frøken Krog, her duties soon extended to coordinating resistance members and parachuting groups. In spring 1944, she began editing Frit Danmark's weekly news sheet while she also published her book 29. August 1943.

Arrested by the Gestapo in September 1944, she escaped from the Frøslev Prison Camp in April 1945, shortly before the Liberation of Denmark. After the end of the occupation, she became a member of the Liberation Movement's Council which had replaced the Freedom Council. In 1945, she published the book Kvinder i Modstandskampen (Women in the Resistance Movement), underlining the important role women had played. She continued to edit Frit Danmark until it closed in 1982. Her political views veered from conservative to left wing.

Fleron was also active in the movement against the Vietnam War. In 1972, she received the PH-Prize for her anti-war activities.

Kate Fleron died on 5 March 2006 and is buried in Frederiksberg Ældre Kirkegård.
