= San Antolín de Bedón (Llanes) =

- Saint Antoninus of Bedón
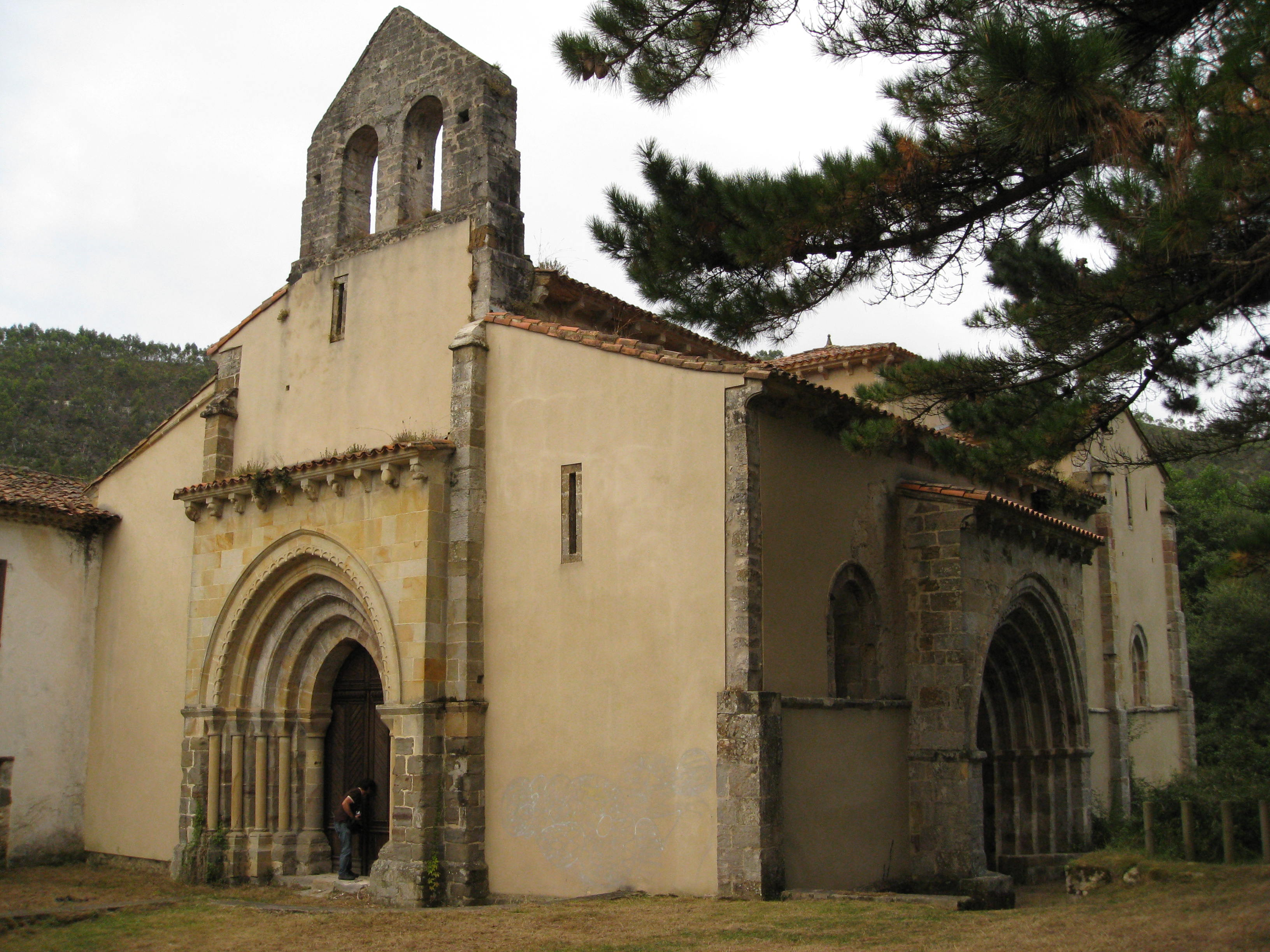
- An image of the church in 2008

- Location within Spain Location within Asturias
- 43°26′17″N 4°52′09″W
- Location: Llanes, Asturias
- Country: Spain

San Antolín de Bedón is a church in Llanes, Asturias, Spain. The church was established in the 13th century. It located near the Monasterio de San Salvador (Celoriu) at the mouth of the River Bedón that divides in two the beach of San Antolin. Being a work with Cistercian construction features, it hardly presents any ornamentation.

== History ==
=== Early history ===
The monastery was dedicated to Saint Antolin of Apamea, a 4th century Syrian martyr whose relics were in the Frédelas abbey near Toulouse whose cult was introduced in the kingdoms of medieval Spain thanks to the impulse of Bishop Ponce, advisor to the king, Sancho Garcés III of Pamplona. The first references to the monastery date back to the 12th century —years 1127, 1174 and 1176— although they are extracts from the lost original documentation. The first reliable mention is found in a donation made on January 26, 1186 by Gonzalo Pérez (Petri) and his son Martín González, who transferred some properties to the monastery of San Vicente in Oviedo. The donation is confirmed by domno Iohanne abbate Sancti Antonini. It was probably at the beginning of the 13th century when the monastery accepted the Benedictine rule and work began on the church, according to an inscription where it is mentioned that the work was started by the Abbot Juan in 1205 as well as another of the same date in the head of the church. The style of the church is similar to that of Santa María de Valdediós near the monastery of the same name, although the latter was built a few years later from that of San Antolín.

The monastery received several donations from Asturian nobles, including Pedro Díaz de Nava, in his will of April 9, 1289, as well as Rodrigo Álvarez de las Asturias, who in his will granted on August 16, 1331 left a thousand maravedí for the monks to sing masses for his soul.

=== 15th and 16th centuries ===
On his trip to Castile after being recognized as king by Pope Leo X, Charles I and his retinue were in the monastery of San Antolín, whose abbot on that date, September 16, 1517, was Pedro de Posada. Three years later, the king, by a royal decree of April 4, 1520, authorized the abbot so that he could found a majorat in his son that was legitimized by the monarch.

In 1531, Pope Clement VII, through an apostolic bull, ordered that the monastery be incorporated into the San Benito congregation in Valladolid due to the decline and deterioration of the monastery. Juan de Estella was appointed as the new abbot, who already appears in his position in 1532 after the annexation. However, when the problems of the monastery were not resolved, twelve years later, in 1544, "at the request of the residents and gentlemen of the town and council of Llanes", San Antolín was annexed as a priory to the nearby monastery of San Salvador de Celoriu.

=== 19th and 20th centuries ===
After the confiscation, the church was abandoned when the neighbors got the religious services to be held in Naves, where the "main altarpiece, the altars and the baptismal font" were moved. They also obtained permission from the bishop in 1858 to tear it down and reuse the materials to reform the chapel of Santa Ana de Naves. The Provincial Monuments Commission, however, managed to save the church and the bishop approved the construction of another parish in Naves and revoked the previous permit.

On June 4, 1931, a decree was published in the Madrid Gazette in which the church was classified as a "historical-artistic monument", currently Bien de Interés Cultural. Darío de Regoyos reproduced it in an oil painting, exhibited in the Museum of Fine Arts of Asturias.

== See also ==
- Asturian art
- Catholic Church in Spain

== Bibliography ==
- Calleja Puerta, Miguel (2001). El conde Suero Vermúdez, su parentela y su entorno social: La aristocracia asturleonesa en los siglos XI y XII (in Spanish). KRK Ediciones. ISBN 84-95401-68-1.
- García Cuetos, María Pilar (1995–1996). El Monasterio de San Antolín de Bedón, Llanes (PDF) (in Spanish). Asturiensia medievalia. ISSN 0301-889X.
- Martínez González, Rafael (1999). "San Antolín en el arte palentino" (PDF). Publicaciones de la Institución Tello Téllez de Meneses. Institución Tello Téllez de Meneses. ISSN 0210-7317.
- Ruiz de la Peña Solar, Juan Ignacio (2009). Castilla y el mundo feudal, homenaje al profesor Julio Valdeón. Valladolid: Junta de Castilla y León, Consejería de Cultura y Turismo, Universidad de Valladolid. ISBN 978-84-9718-582-0.
- Torrente Fernandez, Isabel (1982). The domain of the Monastery of San Bartolomé de Nava (13th-16th centuries) . Oviedo: University of Oviedo, Department of Medieval History. ISBN 84-85377-16-8.
- Torrente Fernández, Isabel (1982). El dominio del Monasterio de San Bartolomé de Nava (siglos XIII-XVI). Oviedo: Universidad de Oviedo, Department of Medieval History. ISBN 84-85377-16-8.
