= Villaḥormes =

Villaḥormes (Asturian: [biʎaˈhoɾmes]), officially Villahormes (Spanish: [biʎaˈoɾmes]) until 2005, is a village in the parish of Ḥontoria in Llanes municipality, in eastern Asturias, Spain. Its railway station has linked the city of Llanes with Ribadesella since 1905. Neighboring villages include Cardosu, Naves and the capital of the parish, Ḥontoria.
