= Playa de Gulpiyuri =

Flooded sinkhole in Asturias, Spain

Coordinates: 43.44756°N 4.886105°W

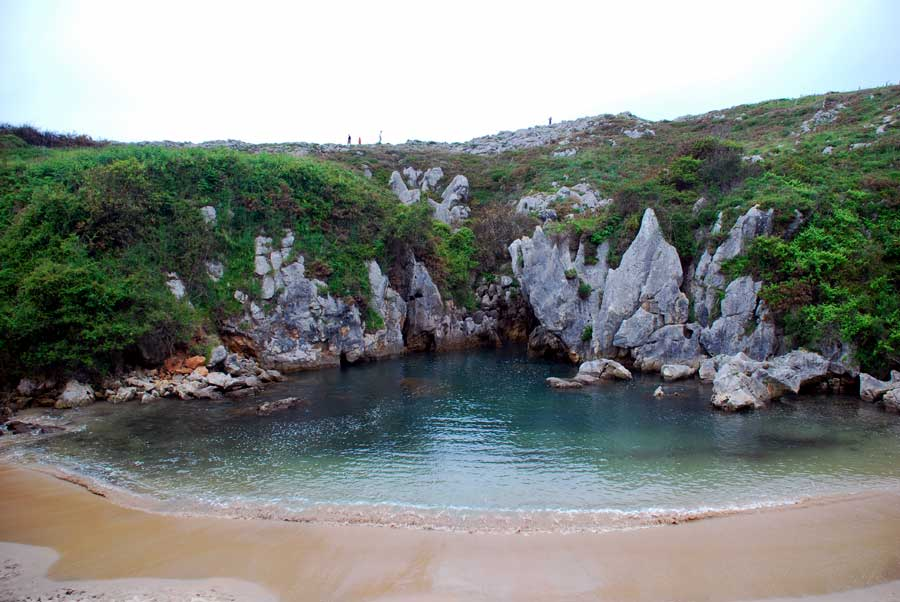
Gulpiyuri beach

Playa de Gulpiyuri is a flooded sinkhole with an inland beach located near Llanes, in Asturias, northern Spain, around 100 m from the Cantabrian Sea.

Roughly 40 meters in length, it is fully tidal due to a series of tunnels carved by the salt water of the Cantabrian Sea, which allows water from the Bay of Biscay to create small waves.

The word ‘Gulpiyuri’ means ‘water circle’. Unlike many other hidden beaches around the world, Playa de Gulpiyuri is actually fully tidal and even has waves bathing the small strip of sand. The crystal clear water may be a little cold after remaining underground for a while before getting to Gulpiyuri Beach.

It is a popular tourist destination, natural monument, and part of Spain's Regional Network of Protected Natural Areas.

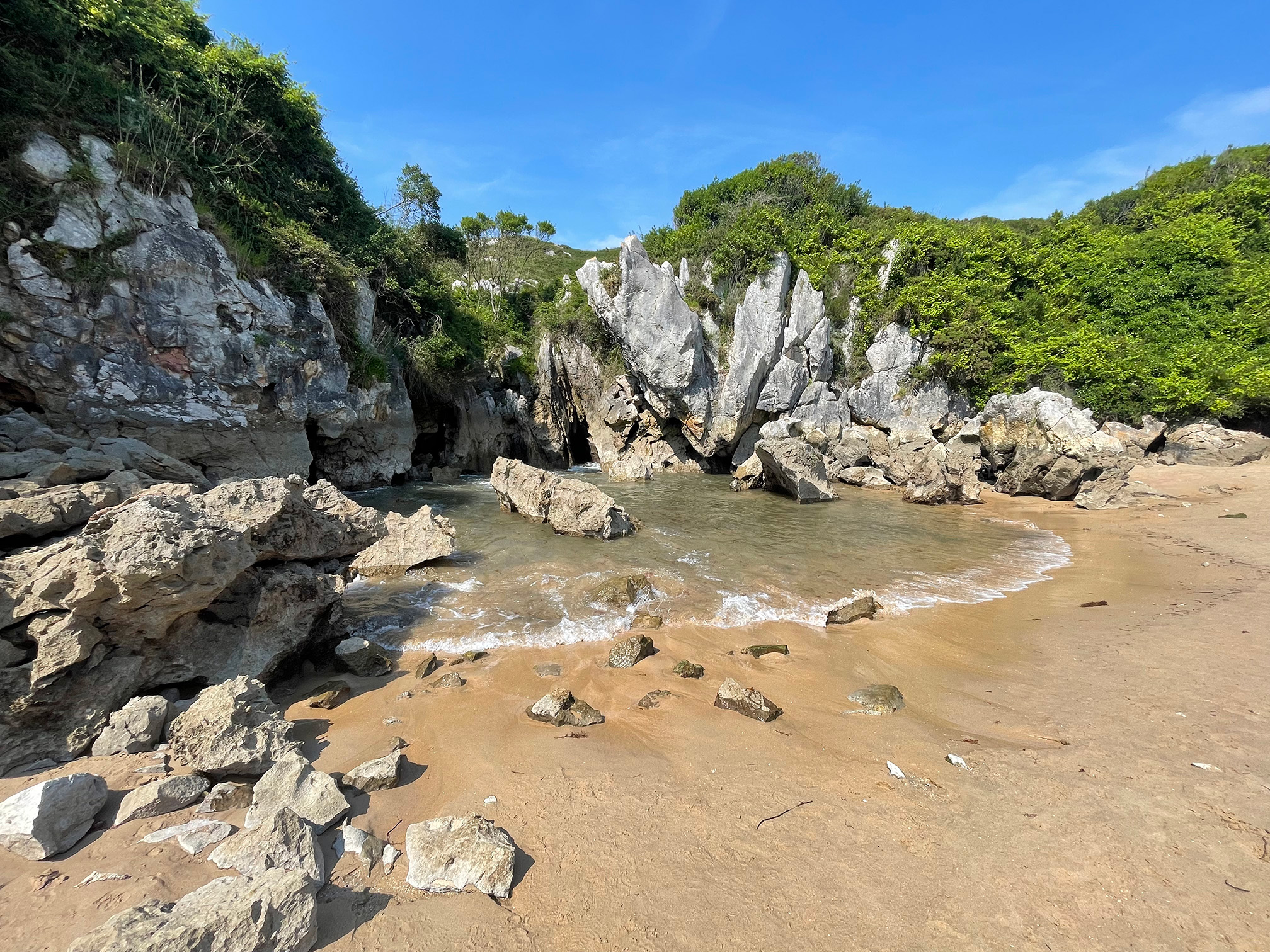
Another view of Gulpiyuri beach

== See also ==
- Blowhole
- Pría
