= Veneranda Manzano =

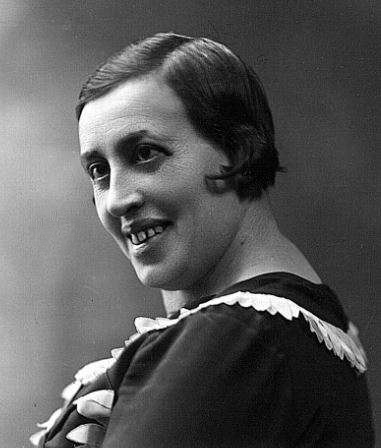
Image of Veneranda García Manzano

Veneranda García-Blanco Manzano (1893–1992) was a Spanish teacher, political activist and union leader. In the 1930s, she was a socialist deputy in the Provisional Government of the Second Spanish Republic. After being exiled in France and Mexico after the Spanish Civil War, she returned to Spain in 1976. In 1945, she was a council member of the Women's International Democratic Federation.

== Biography ==
Born on 27 April 1893 in Beloncio in the northern province of Asturias, Veneranda García Manzano was the daughter of two schoolteachers. She completed her studies at the Normal School in Oviedo, graduating around 1910.

After teaching for several years in schools near her birthplace, she married and in 1918 went to Cuba where she remained until she returned to Spain in 1927. She taught at the school in Vidiago, Llanes, where in 1928 she joined the socialist teachers' union Federación de Trabajadores de la Enseñanza. In 1930, she helped to found the Círculo Republicano de Llanes (Llanes Republican Circle) and in 1931, before the Republic was proclaimed in mid-April, she joined the Spanish Socialist Workers' Party, PSOE, chairing the Llanes chapter. In November 1933, she was elected to the Cortes, representing the PSOE.

In 1937, she accompanied a group of people to France but returned to Spain where, by the beginning of 1938, she was working as a school inspector in Castellón. In July, she was relieved of her post by the Nationalists, while her brother, also a schoolteacher was arrested and executed in Gijón. Her husband apparently also died around this time. Veneranda herself fled to France.

In November 1945, she attended the Paris congress of the Women's International Democratic Federation, an organization in support of women's rights and world peace. She was one of the organization's council members.

She soon moved to Mexico where, despite the blindness she developed, she became active in anti-Franco and anti-war activities and in 1947 joined the communist party. She returned to Spain in the 1970s, settling in Oviedo in 1977.

Veneranda García-Blanco Manzano died in Oviedo on 10 November 1992.
