= Nueva =

Nueva is the Spanish feminine form of the word for "new" and may refer to:

- Isla Nueva, an uninhabited island in Chile
- The Nueva School, a school in Hillsborough, California, USA
- Nueva (Llanes), a parish in Llanes, Asturias, Spain
- Nueva, a restaurant in Delhi, India by Indian cricketer Virat Kohli
