= Víctor de la Fuente =

Spanish comics artist and cartoonist (1927–2010)

Víctor de la Fuente (1927 - 2 July 2010) was a Spanish comic book artist and writer. He worked mostly in the western and heroic fantasy genres.

== Biography ==
De la Fuente was born in Ríocaliente, and started his comics career in Adolfo López Rubio's studio in 1945. In this period he worked for Spanish magazines such as Chicos, Flechas y Pelayos and Zas. In the mid 1940s he moved to Latin America, first to Cuba, then to Argentina and Chile, where he signed a contract with Editorial Zig Zag. In 1957 he became director of the El Peneca magazine and founded his own advertisement agency.

In 1961 he returned to Spain, and subsequently worked for local publishers as well as British ones including Fleetway and DC Thomson. In 1968 he started a collaboration with the French magazine Pilote, published by Dargaud, with the series Les diamants sanglants ("The bloody diamonds"). The following year he began the western comic Sunday, written by Víctor Mora and published by Spanish Selecciones Ilustradas.

In 1969–1971, de la Fuente wrote and drawn the heroic fantasy series Haxtur for the Spanish magazine Trinca; in 1971 he also drew a single story for American publisher Warren, "I Am Dead, Egypt. Dead", written by Doug Moench, which appeared in Eerie #35. The story won the 1972 Warren Award for best story. In 1972 he created, again for Trinca, the post-apocalypse series Mathai-Dor, which remained unfinished due to rights problems. In the same year he moved to France, and executed the erotic-western series Mortimer for Italian publisher E.P. In 1973 Haxtur won two awards at the Trieste and Genoa comics festivals in Italy.

In 1974 he created another western series, Amargo, for Hachette. In 1976 he took part to the comics adaptation of the Holy Bible and the history of France for Larrousse. In 1977 he collaborated with the Belgian magazine Tintin and, in 1978, he created another heroic fantasy character, Haggarth, for the Belgian magazine À Suivre. In 1979, he began the long western series Los gringos, written initially by Jean-Michel Charlier and, from 1992 onwards, by Guy Vidal.

His last works were a series of Tex Willer stories for Italian publisher Sergio Bonelli Editore and the French album Aliot, written by Alejandro Jodorowsky. De la Fuente died in 2010 and was buried at Le Mesnil-Saint-Denis.
