= Urraca CF =

Association football club in Spain

Coordinates: 43.424769°N 4.856043°W

Urraca
- Full name: Urraca Club de Fútbol
- Nickname: Urracas (The Magpies)
- Founded: 1979
- Dissolved: 3 October 2025
- Ground: Campo de La Corredoria, Posada de Llanes, Asturias, Spain
- Capacity: 1,700
- 2024–25: Tercera Federación – Group 2, 16th of 18 (relegated)
- Website: urracacf.es
Home colours	Away colours

Urraca Club de Fútbol was a Spanish football club based in Posada de Llanes, Llanes in the autonomous community of Asturias. Urraca played in , holding its home games at Estadio La Corredoria, opened in January 2012 with a game Under-17 teams of Spain and Italy. Spaniards won the game by 5–1. It has a capacity for 1,700 people but only 198 seats, all of them in the main tribune.

== History ==
The first Club Deportivo Urraca was founded on 18 August 1949 and dissolved in the 1950s.

The club was refounded as Urraca Club de Fútbol in 1979 and it finished as last qualified in their first season. After spending its entire history at regional divisions, Urraca was promoted to Tercera División – Group 2 in May 2012.

Urraca remained in Tercera División for five consecutive seasons. In 2019, the club returned to the fourth tier after winning the Regional Preferente, thus qualifying for the first time to the Copa del Rey thanks to the new competition format implemented since the 2019–20 season.

After being relegated to Primera Asturfutbol, the former Regional Preferente, on 3 October 2025, it was approved the dissolution of the club due to its high debts.

== Season to season ==
Season	Level	Division	Place	Copa del Rey
1979–80	7	2ª Reg.	14th	
1980–81	7	2ª Reg.	10th	
1981–82	7	2ª Reg.	10th	
1982–83	7	2ª Reg.	6th	
1983–84	7	2ª Reg.	1st	
1984–85	6	1ª Reg.	16th	
1985–86	7	2ª Reg.	3rd	
1986–87	6	1ª Reg.	13th	
1987–88	6	1ª Reg.	18th	
1988–89	7	2ª Reg.	4th	
1989–90	7	2ª Reg.	5th	
1990–91	7	2ª Reg.	3rd	
1991–92	6	1ª Reg.	10th	
1992–93	6	1ª Reg.	16th	
1993–94	6	1ª Reg.	6th	
1994–95	6	1ª Reg.	9th	
1995–96	6	1ª Reg.	19th	
1996–97	7	2ª Reg.	12th	
1997–98	7	2ª Reg.	1st	
1998–99	6	1ª Reg.	8th	

Season	Level	Division	Place	Copa del Rey
1999–2000	6	1ª Reg.	18th	
2000–01	7	2ª Reg.	12th	
2001–02	7	2ª Reg.	4th	
2002–03	7	2ª Reg.	6th	
2003–04	7	2ª Reg.	2nd	
2004–05	7	2ª Reg.	4th	
2005–06	6	1ª Reg.	1st	
2006–07	5	Reg. Pref.	5th	
2007–08	5	Reg. Pref.	11th	
2008–09	5	Reg. Pref.	15th	
2009–10	5	Reg. Pref.	15th	
2010–11	5	Reg. Pref.	11th	
2011–12	5	Reg. Pref.	4th	
2012–13	4	3ª	13th	
2013–14	4	3ª	14th	
2014–15	4	3ª	9th	
2015–16	4	3ª	17th	
2016–17	4	3ª	20th	
2017–18	5	Reg. Pref.	11th	
2018–19	5	Reg. Pref.	1st	

Season	Level	Division	Place	Copa del Rey
2019–20	4	3ª	7th	Preliminary
2020–21	4	3ª	6th / 5th	
2021–22	5	3ª RFEF	14th	
2022–23	6	1ª RFFPA	1st	
2023–24	5	3ª Fed.	8th	
2024–25	5	3ª Fed.	16th	

- 7 seasons in Tercera División
- 3 seasons in Tercera Federación/Tercera División RFEF

== Women's team ==
In December 2014, Urraca CF decided to create a women's team to compete in the Regional league of Asturias. In its first season, the team finished in the 11th position out of 14.

Season	Division	Place	Copa de la Reina
2015–16	Regional	11th	
2016–17	Regional	10th	
2017–18	Regional	5th	
2018–19	Regional	11th	
2019–20	Regional	6th	
