= San Roque l'Acebal =

San Roque l'Acebal, Asturias
- Parish
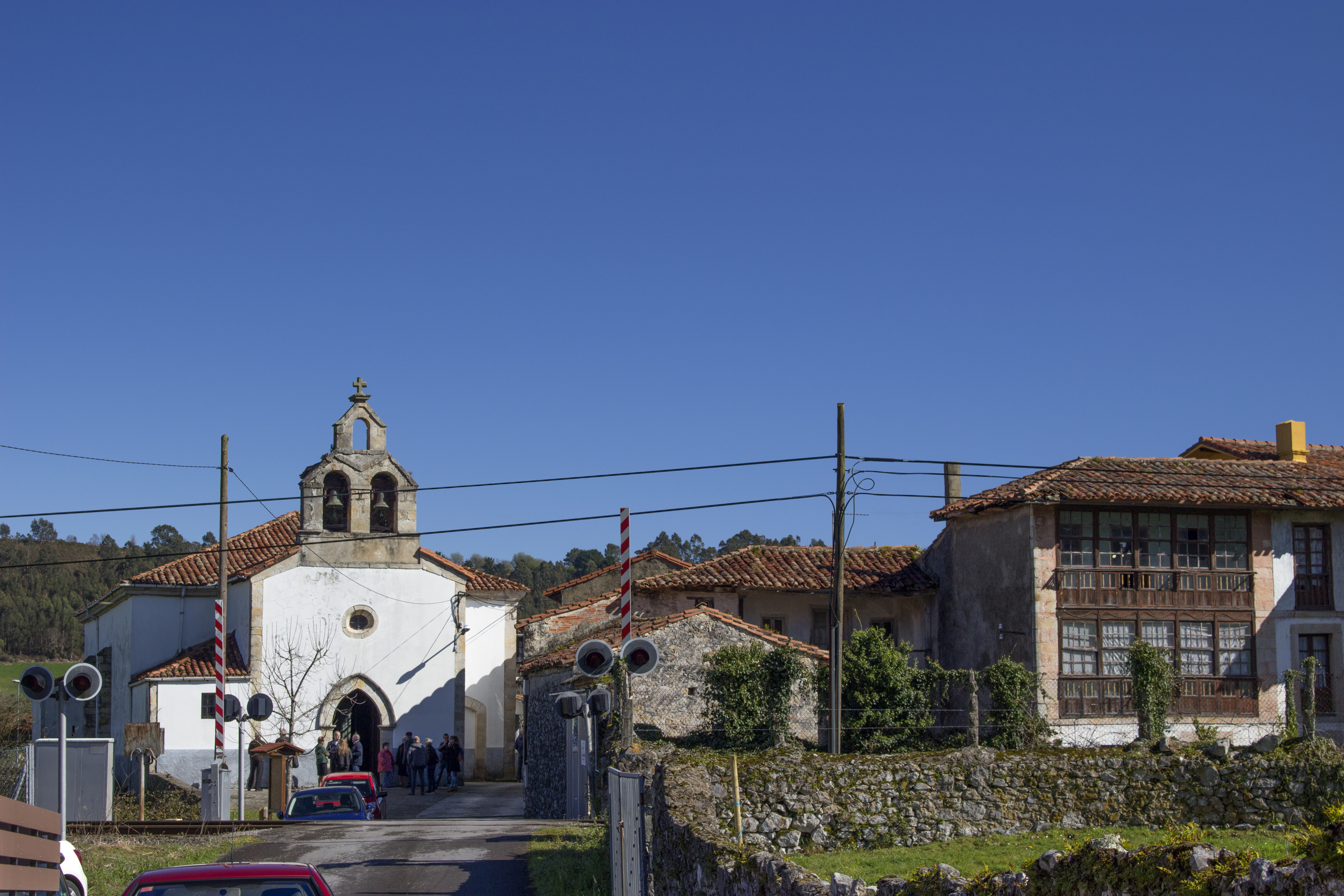
- Interactive map of San Roque l'Acebal, Asturias
- Coordinates: 43.39615°N 4.72656°W
- Country: Spain
- Autonomous community: Asturias
- Province: Asturias
- Municipality: Llanes

San Roque l'Acebal is a parish in Llanes municipality, in eastern Asturias, Spain. It is located in the central area of the conceyu (municipality), and is surrounded by the parishes of Cue (to the north), Purón (to the south), Andrín (to the east) and Llanes (to the west). Its territory, trapezoidal in shape and flat orography, has an extension of 4.06 km^{2}. It only includes the homonymous population center, in which 348 people live (INE, 2022).
