= Women in exile during Francoist Spain =

Women political exiles during the Spanish Civil War

Women in exile during Francoist Spain were a result of their being on the wrong side during the Spanish Civil War. The repression behind nationalist lines during the war and the immediate years that followed left many politically active women with few choices but to leave or face death. The exact totals of women who were murdered, fled or disappeared is unknown, as it was only possible to make estimates.

For those who had been politically active, a number continued to oppose the regime from exile. This included Republican militants broadly who sometimes coordinated together. It also included Mujeres Libres. Unlike other groups, most militants only became active as a result of the war. Consequently, they were less politically in exile and only saw a resurgence in the mid-1960s. Partido Comunista de España (PCE) was the most active political group both inside Spain and abroad. PCE's Unión de Mujeres Antifascistas Españolas (UMAE) attracted large numbers of politically active female Spanish exiles. They were not about liberating women as part of a broader agenda, but instead imposed strict gender norms.

Women from Partido Socialista Obrero Español (PSOE) also went to Mexico, with four of PSOE's five Second Republican female deputies, Veneranda García Manzano, Matilde de la Torre, Julia Álvarez Resano and Margarita Nelken, going into exile in Mexico. Women gained leadership positions in exile, both in groups in Mexico and France. Some returned and were elected to the Cortes. Women who had been involved with POUM also went into exile, with Mika Etchebéhère the most notable of these. The group would reform following World War II but would dissolve again by the mid-1950s with María Teresa Carbonell, wife of POUM's last President Wilebaldo Solano, helping found Fundació Andreu Nin to keep the group's legacy alive. Basques were also subject to repression in Francoist Spain. Women in the Basque Nationalist Party also went into exile, with many helping in charity work, worshiping activities and propaganda efforts. They also worked to preserve Basque culture and language in exile. Some would return from exile following Franco's death in 1975.

== Going into exile ==
As a consequence of the Spanish Civil War, over a million Spaniards died, another million were forced into exile and an unknown number disappeared. Franco's regime continued Civil War-based reprisals until the end of World War II, with an estimated 200,000 people being executed by the regime or dying in prison in that period for their alleged Republican links. Adolf Hitler provided support for Franco during the Spanish Civil War.

Following the collapse of the Republic in 1938 and the establishment of recognition of the Nationalist government in February 1939, many women went into exile. Women in refugee camps in France often found themselves in squalid conditions. Pregnant women had few facilities to give birth and they were often inadequate. Swiss aid worker Elizabeth Eidenbenz arrived at the camps on the frontier in December 1939, and immediately set about improving maternity services. In the period between December 1939 and February 1944, the facilities she helped to establish saw 597 births of Spanish, Polish and Jewish women. Eidenbenz helped many of the women to get papers and visas for themselves and their children. Despite better facilities, many things could not be done including cesarean sections. As a consequence, infant morality rates remained high, with many newborns dying within weeks of their birth.

Women who remained were subjected to economic reprisals by the regime. In Galicia, around 14,600 people were victims of such reprisals. Former Republican A Gudiña mayor Florinda Ortega Pérez was one such victim. The Government confiscated her business and all her property, along with fining her 10,000 pesetas. This bankrupted her and forced her into exile.

== Exile groups ==
=== Republican militants ===
Most of the resistance in Spain during the early Franco period was a result of guerrillas, who coordinated their activities in the interior both with political militants in exile and with militants in prison. Most of Spain's militant women who remained in the country were in prison or had gone underground where they served as important figures in coordinating activities between all three groups. Prisons in this case proved invaluable for many militant women as they allowed them to rebuild their activist networks or create new networks. They were also one of the biggest sources of female resistance to the Franco regime by exercising daily resistance behind prison walls.

PSOE, UGT, PCE, CNT, Juventudes Socialistas de España (JSE), Movimiento Libertario Español (MLE) and the Moviment Socialista de Catalunya (MSC) continued their struggle in exile. From 1944 to 1960, the French city of Toulouse served as a major publishing hub for many of these organizations' home in exile. The city of Toulouse itself would see around 40,000 exiles from these groups settle permanently in the city.

=== Mujeres Libres ===
The CNT aligned women's group, Mujeres Libres, had its leaders generally flee into exile abroad with the notable exception of Lucía Sánchez Saomil who went into internal exile. Mujeres Libres disappeared from the scene during the early Francoist period. This was largely a result of most of the women involved not having been involved in militant activities before the start of the Civil War. Sara Berenguer was a CNT affiliated miliciana in the Spanish Civil War. The poet was forced into exile in France after the war, where she wrote about her experiences and that of other women who fought with her. In 1964, Spanish exile women began publishing Mujeres Libres again.

=== Partido Comunista de España ===
Partido Comunista de España became the dominant clandestine political organization in Spain following the end of the Civil War. It would retain this position until the death of Franco saw PSOE replace it. Women were involved with the party, helping to organize covert armed resistance by serving in leadership roles and assisting in linking up political leaders in exile with those active on the ground in Spain. During the later part of the war and at its conclusion, some women from POUM were coerced into making false confessions in Moscow courtrooms, and then sent to Soviet prisons. Their major crime was being Trotskyites.

PCE aligned Unión de Mujeres Antifascistas Españolas (UMAE) attracted large numbers of Spanish exiles in France in the immediate post-war period. It faced more challenges recruiting members in the interior. The group published a magazine in France called Noticias del interior, which discussed the activities of UMAE women working in the interior and manifestos written by these militants. In Paris in the mid-1940s, UMAE took pains to make clear that women could be involved with the organization while keeping up with all their domestic work. PCE did not want to scare away more traditional women by making the organization too focused on male militant activities. Further, they also wanted to broaden their support base to include traditionalists and Catholic women who firmly supported traditional Spanish gender roles. Activities for women included supporting prisoners, fund-raising, protecting children, acquiring clothing for distribution to other exiles in need and providing snacks for PCE party events. Neus Catalá and Irene Falcón were both involved in PCE in the exterior in the 1940s.

=== Partido Socialista Obrero Español ===
Following the end of the Spanish Civil War, the leadership of PSOE went into exile and reconstituted themselves externally with their leadership largely based in France. Inside Spain, PSOE shrank to all but a few militants mostly based in the Basque country and Asturian UGT strongholds.

Socialist women also went into exile during and after the Spanish Civil War. Oran, Algeria, received around 7,000 members of PSOE and UGT who fled into exile as a result of the Spanish Civil War. UGT and PSOE party member Selina Asenjo Puello went into exile in Argentina after 12 years in France. María Lejárraga also spent time in exile in many European and South American countries. Spanish Socialist women in general found their most welcome home in Mexico. Four of PSOE's five Second Republican female deputies eventually sought exile in Mexico. These women included Veneranda García Manzano, Matilde de la Torre, Julia Álvarez Resano and Margarita Nelken.

In 1943, Claudina García Perez was invited to serve on the interior Executive Commission. She also served on the PSOE First and Second Executive Commission in the same period. Franco's government spied on her and persecuted her, before hunting her down with the intention of arresting her. García Perez then fled into exile in France in December 1946. The International Socialist Conference in Zurich in June 1947, with García Perez serving as the secretary of the Feminine Section of PSOE. She then moved to Mexico in February 1948.

The early Francoist period saw both PSOE and UGT largely absent from leadership positions. The only socialist woman in leadership for PSOE was Carmen Maestre Martín, and she was actually on the executive committee of Junta de Liberación Española (JEL), which was not founded until February 1943. On 30 January 1944, she was appointed to the Sección de Trabajo, Previsión, Asistencia y Sanidad del Consejo Técnico of JLE. Matilde de la Torre and Julia Álvarez Resano had both been expelled from PSOE in 1946, and became political non-entities as a result. Dolores Arizaga went into exile in France following the end of the Spanish Civil War. She would serve as a representative of Section of Tarbes (Hautes Pyrénées) at the II PSOE Congress in exile in 1946. Carmen García Bloise joined the socialist movement as the daughter of a Spanish PSOE exile in Paris in 1948 when joined Juventudes Socialistas.

Agrupación de Socialistas Asturianos en México member Purificación Tomás played an important role among socialist women in Mexico in the 1940s and 1950s. She was affiliated with the UGT affiliated exile group Círculo Pablo Iglesias. In 1942, Spanish Republican groups in exile met in Mexico, forming the Unión Democrática Española (UDE). Participants included PSOE, UGT, Izquierda Republicana (IR), Unión Republicana (UR), Partido Republicano Federal (PRF), Unió de Rabassaires and Aliança Nacional de Catalunya (ANC). Partido Comunista Española (PCE) was excluded as communists were out of favor following the end of the Spanish Civil War.

PSOE, UGT, PCE, Confederación Nacional del trabajo (CNT), Juventudes Socialistas de España (JSE), Movimiento Libertario Español (MLE) and the Moviment Socialista de Catalunya (MSC) continued their struggle in exile. From 1944 to 1960, the French city of Toulouse served as a major publishing hub for many of these organizations' home in exile. The city of Toulouse itself would see around 40,000 exiles from these groups settle permanently in the city.

During the 1960s in Mexico, Purificación Tomás played a leading role among exiled socialist women. She was in charge of organizing the IX Congreso of PSOE in Mexico in 1964. Purificación Tomás created the Secretariado Femenino, with the goal of integrating women's issues into the broader Spanish socialist movement. She built and maintained contacts with the Socialist International Women.

Carmen García Bloise represented the Paris Section at the XI PSOE Congress in 1970 and 1972. From 1970 to 1972, Carmen García Bloise was a substitute member of the PSOE Steering Committee in exile based on her position in the 6th area (Seiene). Carmen García Bloise would be appointed the Secretary of the Formación del Militante by the new PSOE committee following the XII Congreso of PSOE that saw the interior finally come into power. Palmira Pla Pechovierto returned from Venezuelan exile in the late 1970s. The teacher immediately became involved with PSOE in Castellón, and went on to represent the area in the 1977 Constitutional Legislature of Spain.

=== Partido Obrero de Unificación Marxista ===
Most of POUM's leadership were in Republican prisons in Barcelona near the end of the Civil War at the hands of PCE who acted at the behest of the Soviet Union. Some managed to escape to exile in France, but thousands were stuck in concentration camps. Later, they were accused of opposing the French government and some were sent to German concentration camps. After the end of World War II, POUM constituted itself legally abroad. El Combatiente Rojo was published by POUM starting in 1939. It was one of several publications produced by POUM militants in the decade after the Civil War.

Mika Etchebéhère was a POUM militant who went into exile in Argentina following the war. In a letter to friends in the United States, she said of her experiences, "Sometimes, it seems to me that as long as life is this dreadful quagmire that drowns us, no matter how many efforts we make to try to live normally, they will not be of any use. To live, to hold onto the light, to enjoy the sun, to eat every day, to read books, to what extent all this seems to be wished, forced. Deep down, you feel that you do not live, that you are vegetating, that you are floating." In another letter, she said, "The beings that I love the most have died or are absent and I see this strange fact: I live increasingly away from the beings that surround me, and I take refuge in memories, in the past. I cannot find a place in reality. I'm constantly upset, hurt. Beings and things that I endured perfectly before, now make me nervous and exasperate me to a point that I came to believe myself seriously sick with nerves. The effort that I do to improve myself exhausts me, and I end up shutting myself up with books and memories. Anyway, I'm not worth much lately. However, I hope that one day I will get better." Other POUM women militants in exile expressed similar feelings of isolation and being torn apart inside.

María Teresa Carbonell married the last POUM President Wilebaldo Solano in the 1950s. She assisted him in running POUM's headquarters in Toulouse. She later helped found Fundació Andreu Nin in order to keep the legacy of POUM alive.

=== Basque Nationalist Party ===
PNV's women section, Emakume Abertzale Batza, was created in April 1922 in Bilbao and closed in September of the following year. It was re-created on 23 June 1931. Following the war, most of its members were forced into exile in France, Belgium, England and Catalonia, where the organization was reconstituted and would never return to Spain. Many Emakume Abertzale Batza women stood out from other Republicans in that they were Catholic and celebrated mass in refugee camps. Their first board in exile included President Concepción de Azaola, Vice President María Teresa Salcedo, Secretary Angeles Zuazagoitia, Deputy Secretary Martina Bernal de Azurmendi, Treasurer Garbiñe de Urresti, Deputy Treasurer María Elosua de Irizar, and members Alava de Miremón, María Olondo de Etxebarria, Miren Irujo, and Miren de Guerricagoitia. The French group was involved with charity work, worship activities and propaganda efforts. They also encouraged other Basques to subscribe to PNV publications. The women constructed two chapels in refugee camp hospitals. They also organized a Basque language course. They tried to help other Basque women find accommodation in Catalonia. They provided mail networks for clandestine PNV activities. Basque PNV women in exile in Argentina created a branch of the organization on 16 August 1938 called Acción Nacionalista Vasca. Women involved in the initial organizing of the group included Amelia Arteche de Jáuregui, Amelia G. De Menchaca, María Begoña de Orbea como Tesorera y Angelita de Bilbao, Arantzazu de Barrena, Ikerne de Kortazar, Antonia de Amorrortu and Miren de Muxika. Their goal was to keep Basque culture and language alive among exiles in the country.

Garbiñe Urresti was another member of Emakume Abertzale Batza who worked as a nurse during the Civil War. She finally left Spain, going into exile in Caracas, Venezuela, where she was a member of the PNV and STV Junta Extraterritoriales. She joined and created local Basque cultural institutions in the city, and helped run a Basque language radio station. Julene Azpeitia was a teacher involved with PNV before the Civil War. She fled Spain following the war, but returned by 1947 where she took a teaching job at a Provincial Councila school of Bilbao. The regime punished her with jail time in 1949, and was let out in 1952.

Itziar Mujika Irastorza was Emakume Abertzale Batza member and secretary before the Spanish Civil War. During the war, she went to France where she became involved with the Francophone Basque Resistance Information Service, helping to clandestinely send messages to people in prison. She was given a death sentence in 1941, which was commuted the next year to 30 years and then freed in 1944 if she agreed to go into exile.

Garbiñe Urresti returned from exile in Venezuela after Franco's death and ran a clandestine Basque language radio station. She helped prepare programs and helped prepare information for air. She also was an on air personality.

== Motherhood ==
Republican mothers abroad addressed the problem of specifically being targeted by Franco's regime by creating the Unión de Mujeres Españoles (UME) in France. The purpose of the organization was to legitimize political activity of mothers as being part of the broader efforts of "female consciousness". UME published a magazine called Mujeres Antifascistas Españolas. The publication linked Republican women in exile with those in Spain, including some who were in prison. It honored women's roles as front line combatants, and suggested the special role of motherhood made their voices more valuable when it came to speaking out against the problems of the Franco regime. This contrasted with the beliefs of Spanish Communist women in exile, which suggested mothers in this period should fade into the background, serving in roles that supported single women and men who could be more visible in the struggle against Franco. Communists emphasized a traditional view of motherhood espoused by Franco.
