= Iglesia de la Virgen de la Guía (Llanes) =

- Iglesia de la Virgen de la Guía (Llanes)
- Location: Asturias, Spain

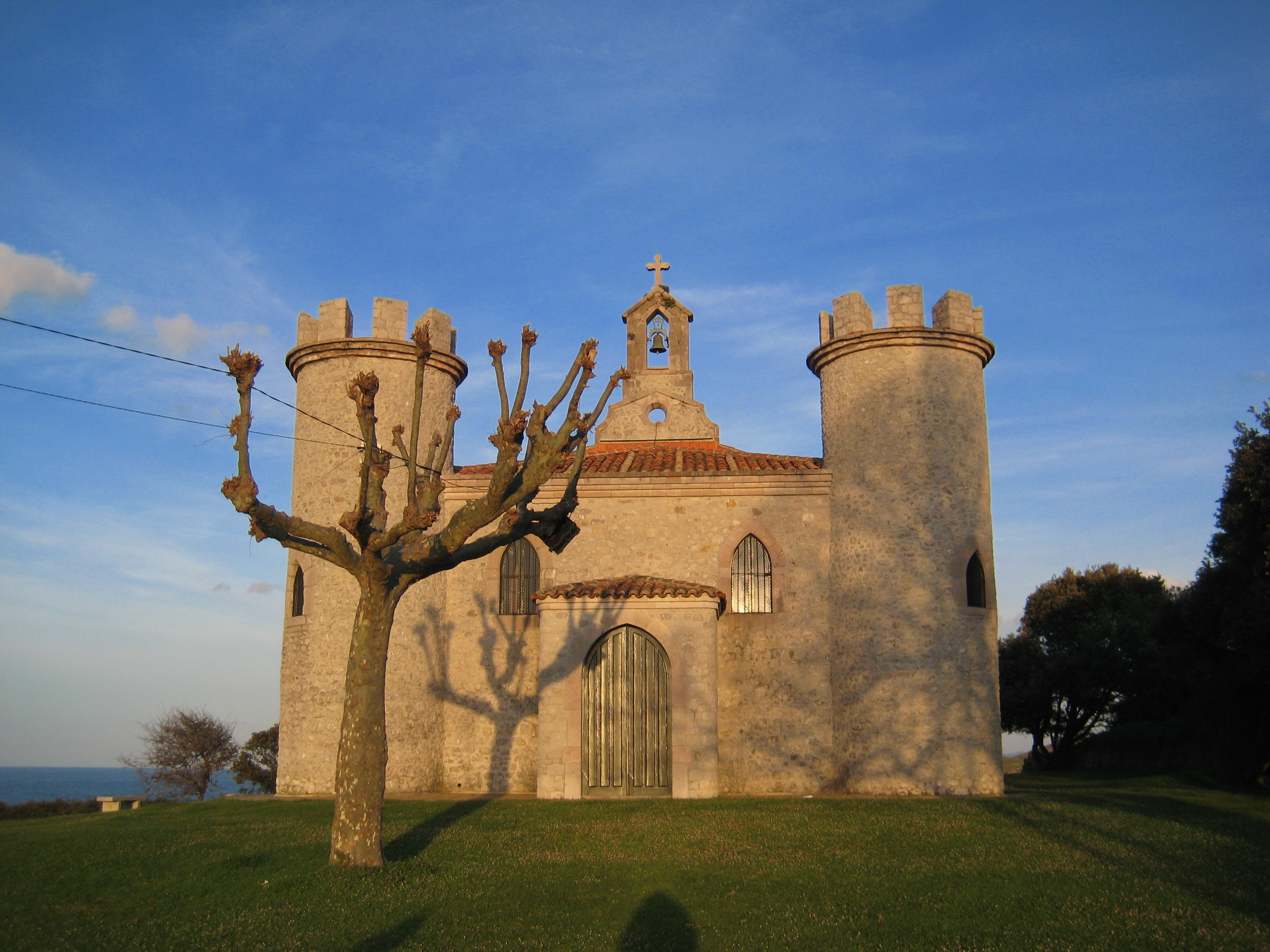
Ermita de la Guía de Llanes - 2.jpg

Iglesia de la Virgen de la Guía (Llanes) is a church in Llanes, Asturias, Spain.

== See also ==
- Asturian art
- Catholic Church in Spain
- Churches in Asturias
- List of oldest church buildings
