= Tresgrandas =

Coordinates: 43.37938°N 4.6086°W

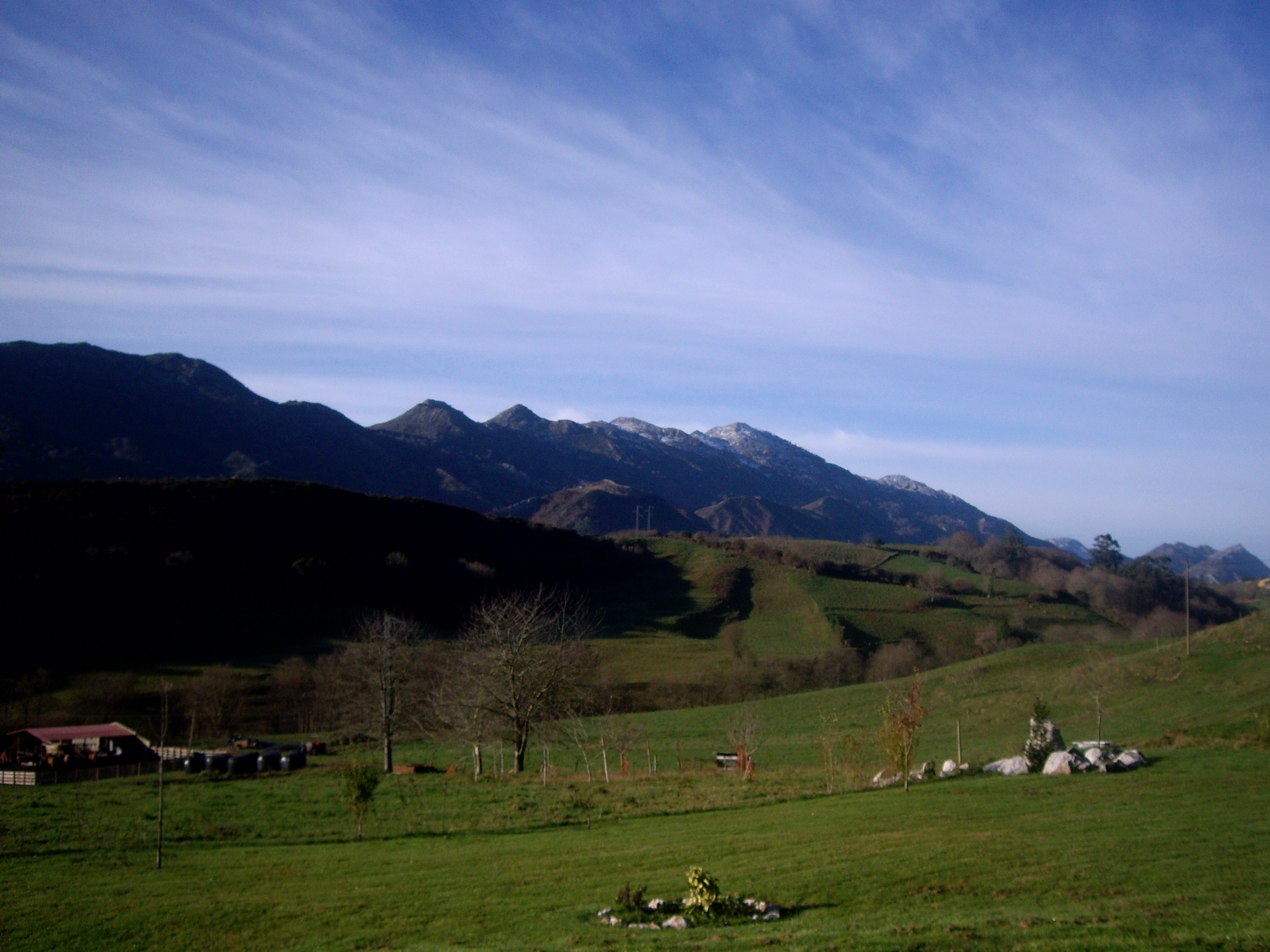
Fields of Tresgrandas

Tresgrandas is one of 28 parishes in Llanes, a municipality within the province and autonomous community of Asturias, in coastal northern Spain.

The parroquia is 3.04 km^{2} (1.17 sq mi) in size, with a population of 59 in 2011.
