= Porrúa (Llanes) =

- Parish
- Location within Spain
- Coordinates: 43.416667°N 4.8°W
- Country: Spain
- Autonomous community: Asturias
- Province: Asturias
- Municipality: Llanes

Porrúa is one of 28 parishes (administrative divisions) in Llanes, a municipality within the province and autonomous community of Asturias, in northern Spain.

== Villages ==
- Porrúa
