= Parres (Llanes) =

Parres is one of the 28 parishes (administrative divisions) in Llanes, a municipality within the province and autonomous community of Asturias, in northern Spain.

Main villages or inhabited sites:

- Parres (village in Llanes, not the same name municipality)
- La Pereda
- Santa Marina
- Rumoru
- Bolao
- Los Carriles
- Las Melendreras
- Colmenera

The population as of 2023 is 369.
