= Barru (Llanes) =

- Parish
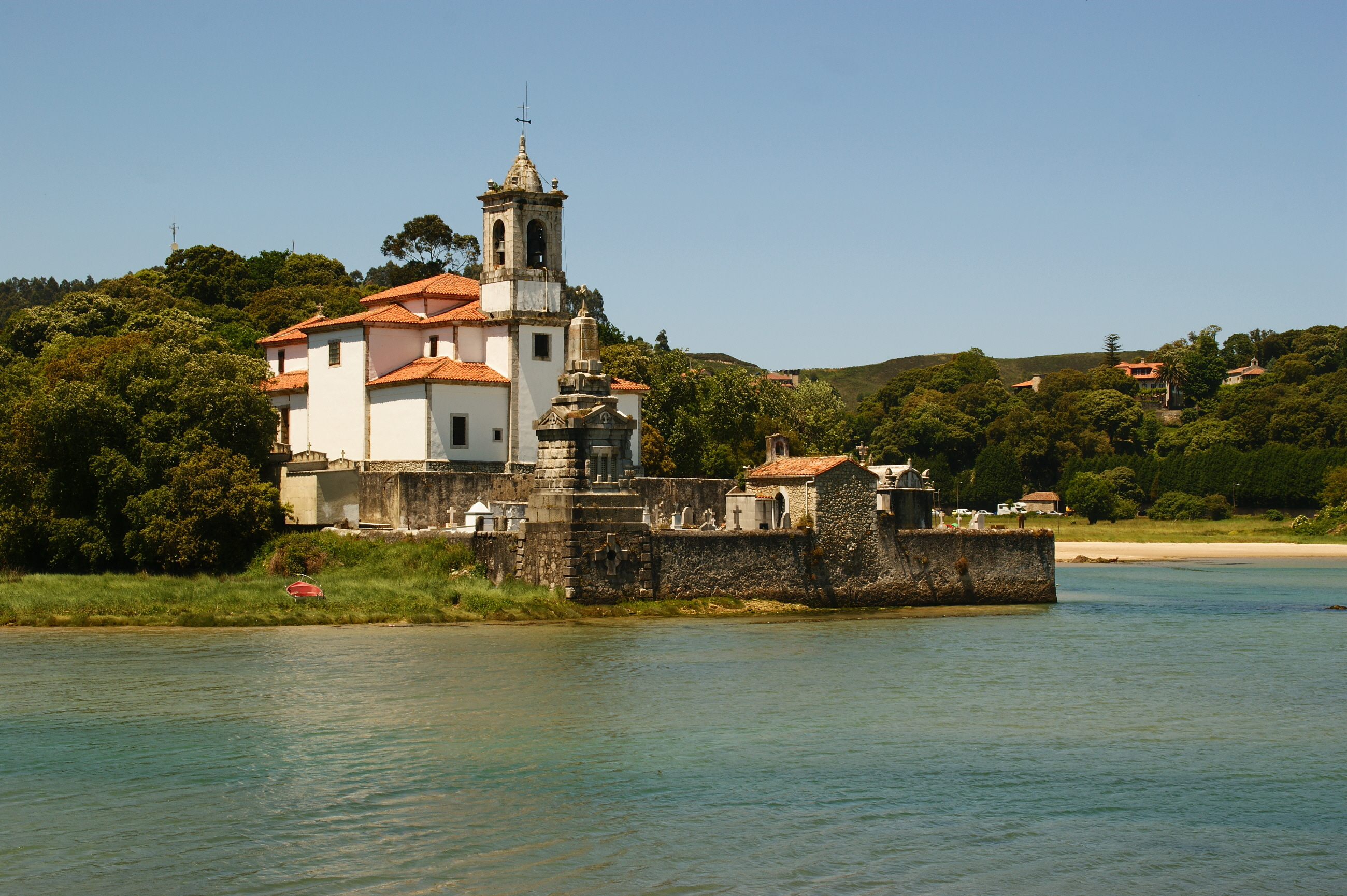
- Iglesia de Nuestra Señora de los Dolores

- Location within Spain
- Coordinates: 43°26′1″N 4°49′50″W
- Country: Spain
- Autonomous community: Asturias
- Province: Asturias
- Municipality: Llanes

Population (2023)
  - Total: 469

Barru (Spanish: Barro) is one of 28 parishes (administrative divisions) in Llanes, a municipality within the province and autonomous community of Asturias, in northern Spain.

Its population as of 2023 is 469.

== Villages ==
- Valmori
- Barru
- Niembru
