= Ḥontoria =

- Parish
- Location within Spain
- Coordinates: 43.45°N 4.916667°W
- Country: Spain
- Autonomous community: Asturias
- Province: Asturias
- Municipality: Llanes

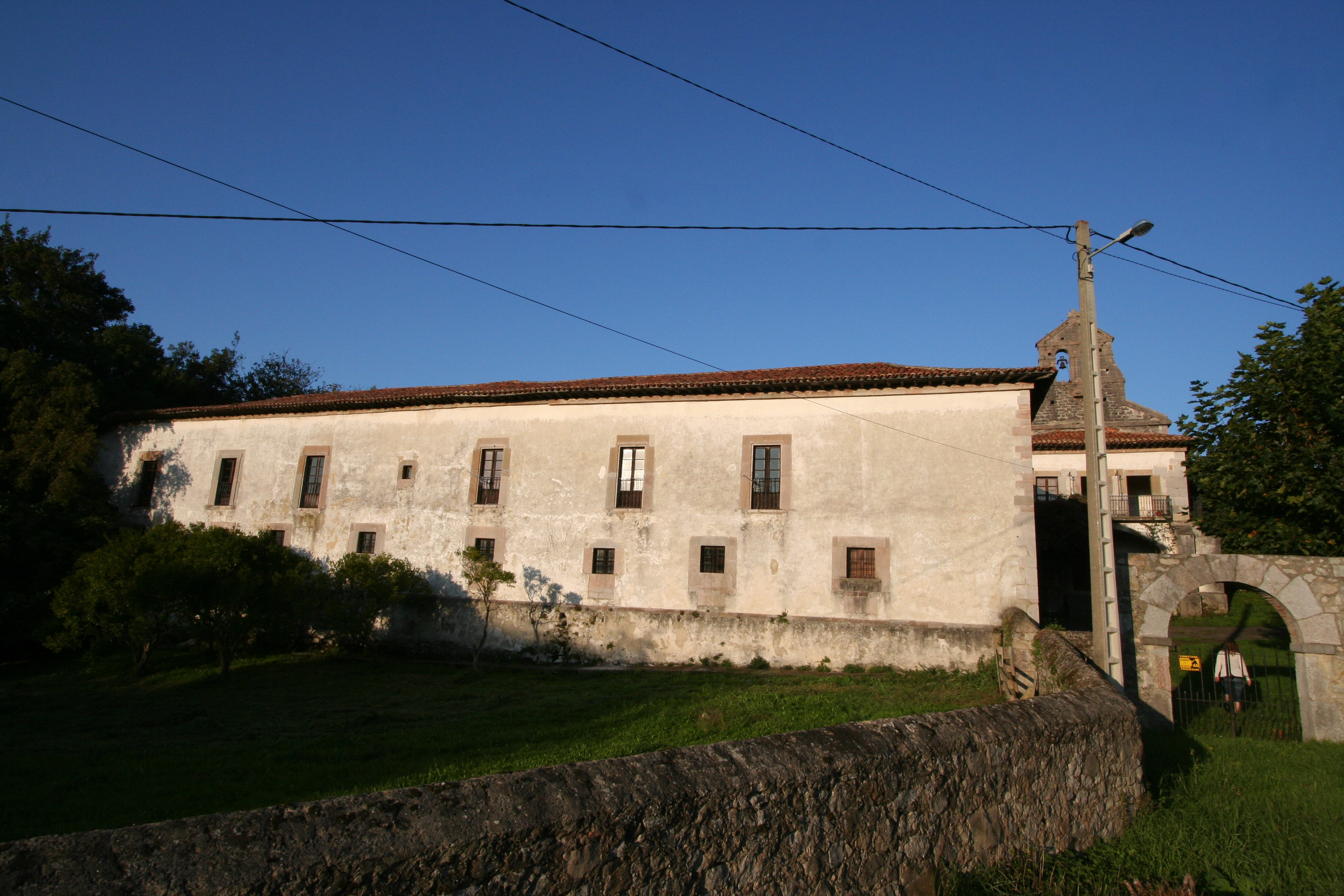
Palacio de Espriella in Villaḥormes, a village in Ḥontoria.

Ḥontoria (Asturian pronunciation: [honˈtoɾja]) is one of 28 parishes (administrative divisions) in Llanes, a municipality within the province and autonomous community of Asturias, in northern Spain.

== Villages ==
- Cardosu
- Ḥontoria
- Villaḥormes
