= Carranzo =

- Parish
- Location within Spain
- Coordinates: 43.383333°N 4.633333°W
- Country: Spain
- Autonomous community: Asturias
- Province: Asturias
- Municipality: Llanes

Population (2023)
  - Total: 112

Carranzo is one of 28 parishes (administrative divisions) in Llanes, a municipality within the province and autonomous community of Asturias, in northern Spain.

Its population as of 2023 is 112.
