= Capilla de la Magdalena (Llanes) =

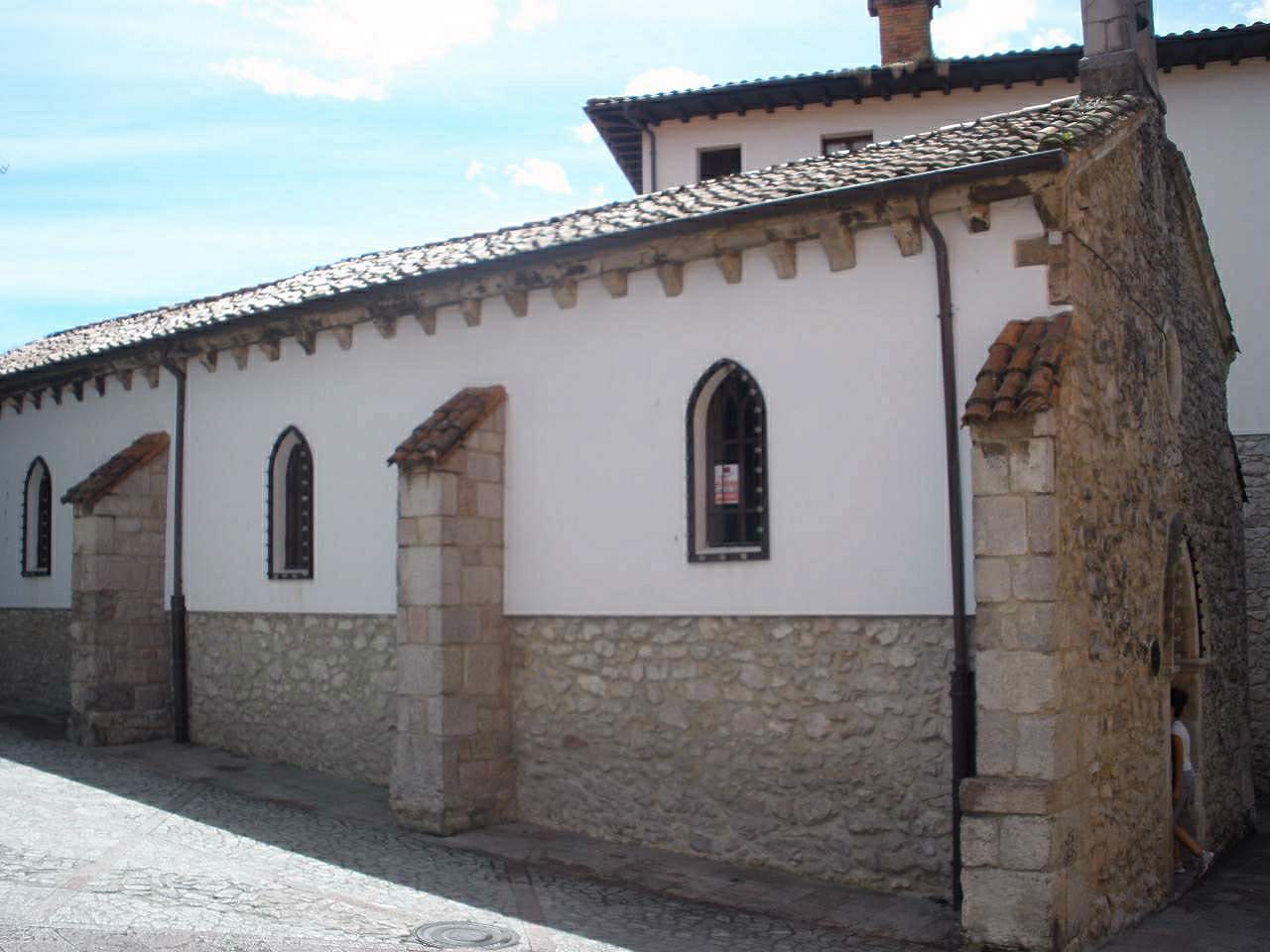
- Capilla de la Magdalena (Llanes)
- Location: Llanes, Asturias, Spain

Capilla de la Magdalena (Llanes) is a church in Llanes, Asturias, Spain. The church was established in the 18th century.

== See also ==
- Asturian art
- Catholic Church in Spain
- Churches in Asturias
- List of oldest church buildings
