= La Borbolla =

- Parish
- Location within Spain
- Coordinates: 43.366667°N 4.633333°W
- Country: Spain
- Autonomous community: Asturias
- Province: Asturias
- Municipality: Llanes

Population
  - Total: 155 rooms

La Borbolla is one of 28 parishes (administrative divisions) in Llanes, a municipality within the province and autonomous community of Asturias, in northern Spain. It has a population of 155 inhabitants, and its parish church is dedicated to St. Sebastian. It is nestled near the Cantabrian Sea and within the Sierra del Cuera mountain range, close to the Picos de Europa and the border with Cantabria.

== Villages ==
- L'Arna
- La Borbolla
- La Braña Vieja
- El Cerecéu
- El Colláu
- El Ganciosu
- El Gromaz
- El Molinu la Pisa
- El Molinu
- El Prau
- El Redondal
- El Requeju
- El Rilosu
