= Po, Asturias =

Coordinates: 43.42469°N 4.78349°W

- Parish
- Interactive map of Po, Asturias
- Country: Spain
- Autonomous community: Asturias
- Province: Asturias
- Municipality: Llanes

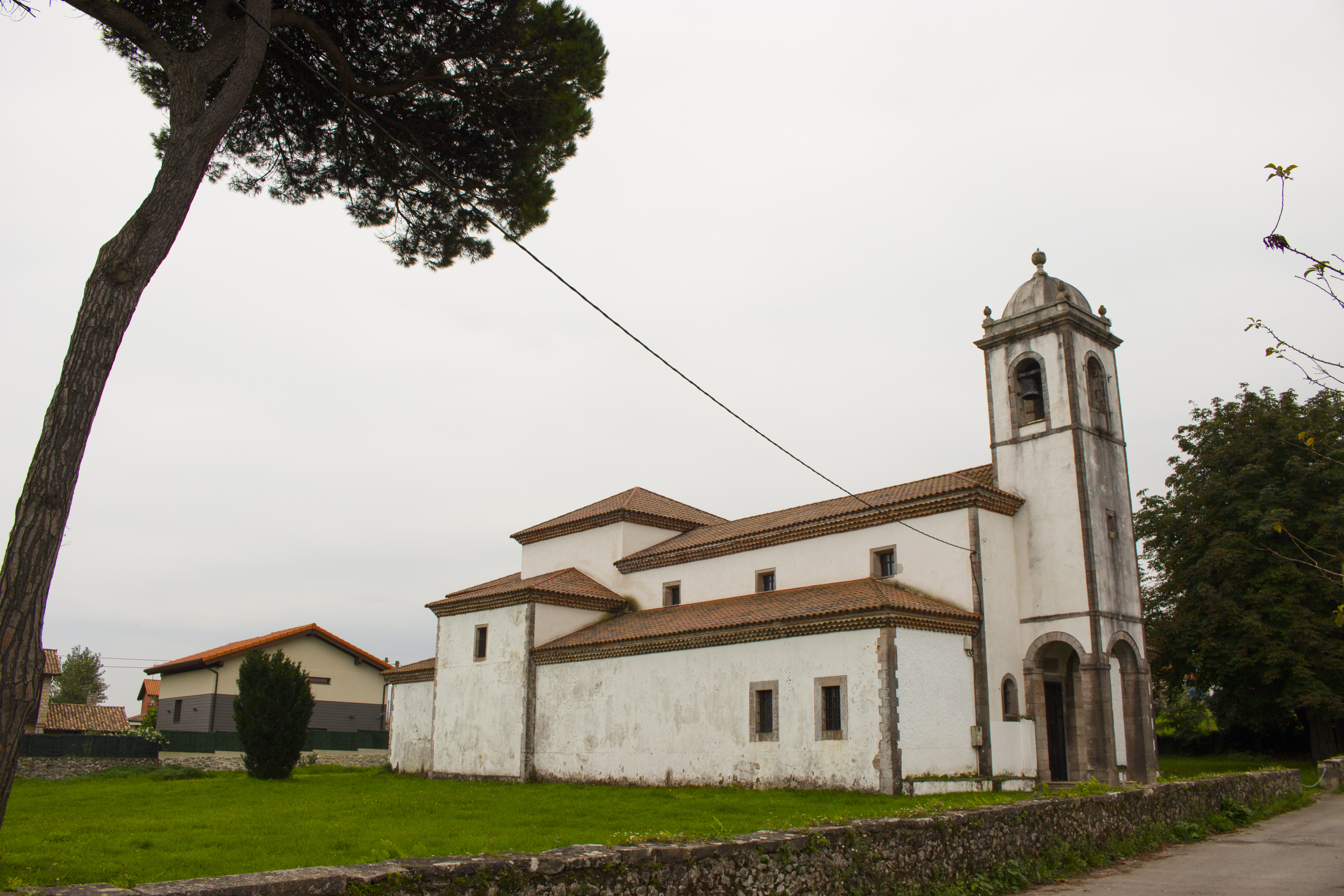
Po (Llanes, Asturias) in 2019

Po (Spanish: Poo) is a parish of the municipality of Llanes, Asturias, in the coast of northern Spain. The small town of Po is situated about 2 kilometers from the capital of the municipality.

At Po Beach (Playa de Poo), water filters into the cove at high tide, turning it into a lagoon popular for swimming.
