= Church of San Salvador de Valdediós =

Roman Catholic church in Asturias, Spain

Church of the Holy Savior of Valdediós Iglesia de San Salvador de Valdediós (in Spanish)
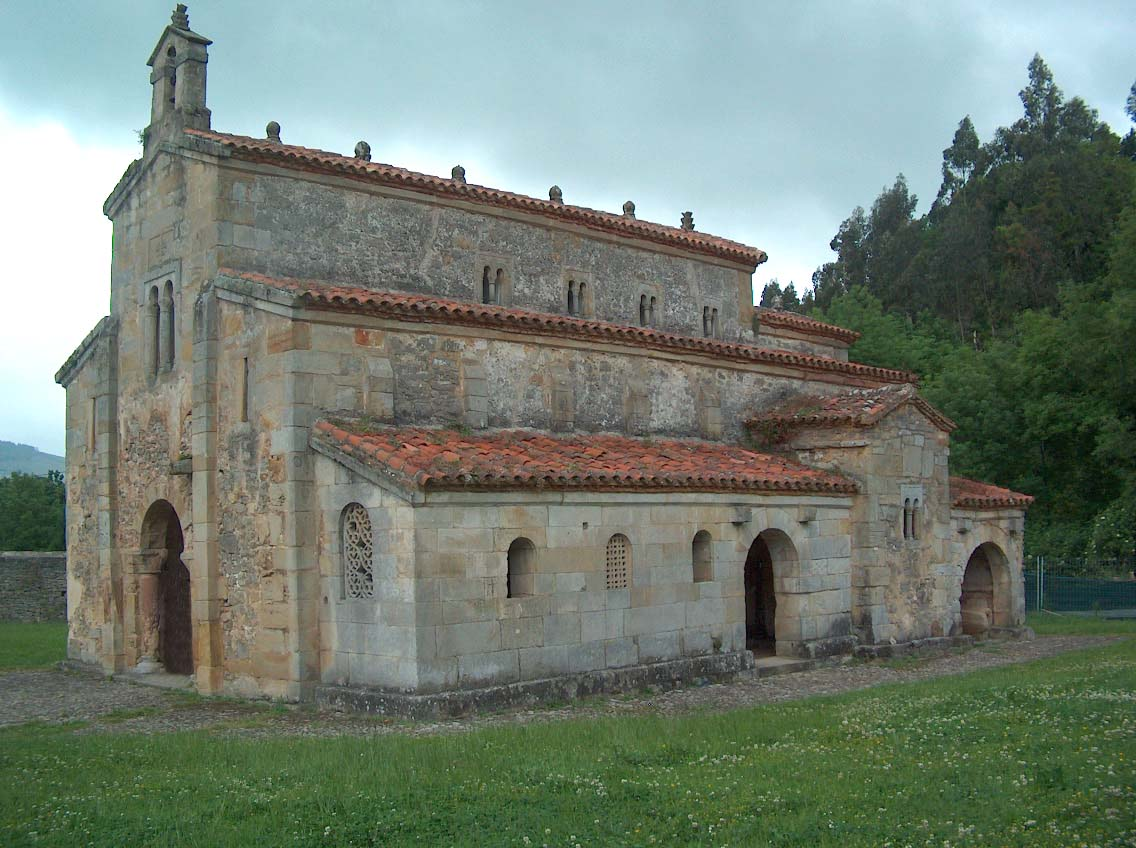

Religion
- Affiliation: Roman Catholic
- Province: Asturias
- Ecclesiastical or organisational status: Church
- Year consecrated: 893

Location
- Location: Oviedo, Spain
- Interactive map of Church of the Holy Savior of Valdediós; Iglesia de San Salvador de Valdediós (in Spanish)
- Coordinates: 43°26′13.6″N 5°30′23.5″W

Architecture
- Type: Church
- Style: Pre-Romanesque

Specifications
- Length: 16 metres (52 ft)
- Width: 13.3 metres (44 ft)

Website
- Official Website

The church of the Holy Savior of Valdediós (Spanish: Iglesia de San Salvador de Valdediós) is a Roman Catholic pre-romanesque church, located next to Villaviciosa, Asturias, Spain.

The church stands in the Boides valley (Villaviciosa), the place where Alfonso III of Asturias was detained when he was dispossessed by his sons, and where there used to be an old convent governed by the Benedictine Order, substituted in the 13th century by the Cistercians. The church known as the "Bishops' Chapel" was consecrated on 16 September 893, with seven bishops in attendance.

The church is next to the Monasterio de Santa María de Valdediós.

== Architecture ==
The church stands on a classic basilica ground plan with a triple sanctuary, separating the central nave from the side aisles with four semicircular arches. At the western end, there are three enclosures, the central one used as an access vestibule, and two located on the left and right which may have been used to house pilgrims. The vault over the central nave, like the one over the apses, is barreled with a brick ceiling and decorated with al fresco wall painting, alternating a variety of geometric designs.

Ground plan of the church

== Royal tribune ==
The royal tribune is located above the vestibule, separate from the area intended for the congregation (spatium fidelium) in the central nave, and this from the area devoted to the liturgy by iron grilles, now disappeared. Particular elements of this church include the covered gallery annexed to the southern facade at a later date or Royal Portico, the 50 cm square columns on the central naves arches, the triple-arched window open in the central apse, and the room above it, exclusively accessed from the exterior by a window which here has two openings, compared with the habitual three.

== See also ==
- Asturian art
- Catholic Church in Spain
