= Sierra del Cuera =

Sierra del Cuera is an integrated network of protected areas in Asturias, Spain.

The landscape stretches over an area which affects five municipalities of the region: Cabrales, Llanes, Peñamellera Alta, Peñamellera Baja and Ribadedeva. It could be defined as a coastal ridge about 40 kilometers long that begins at the Sella River and spreads near the sea into the Deva River. The protected landscape is excluded from the western part of the mountain, i.e. the region between the Bedón River and the Sella River.
