= Iglesia de Santa María (Valdediós) =

- Iglesia de Santa María (Valdediós)
- 43.4365°N 5.5069°W
- Location: Asturias, Spain

Iglesia de Santa María (Valdediós) is a church in Villaviciosa, Asturias, Spain. It is within the Monasterio de Santa María de Valdediós. The only three Romanesque altars in Asturias are preserved in the church.

It is a late-Romanesque style Cistercian church built in the 13th century. The church is made up of three naves with semicircular apses and ribbed vaults.

The church is the only element that survives from the initial construction of the monastery, because the other buildings that made up the group deteriorated due to successive floods in the area.
