= Vidiago =

- Parish
- Location within Spain
- Coordinates: 43.4°N 4.666667°W
- Country: Spain
- Autonomous community: Asturias
- Province: Asturias
- Municipality: Llanes

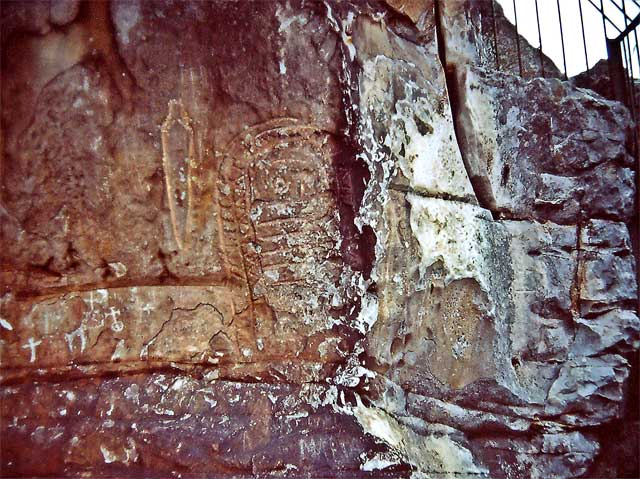
Peña Tú, in Vidiago

Vidiago is one of 28 parishes (administrative divisions) in Llanes, a municipality within the province and autonomous community of Asturias, in northern Spain.

== Villages ==
- Puertas
- Riegu
- Vidiago
