= Pría =

- Parish
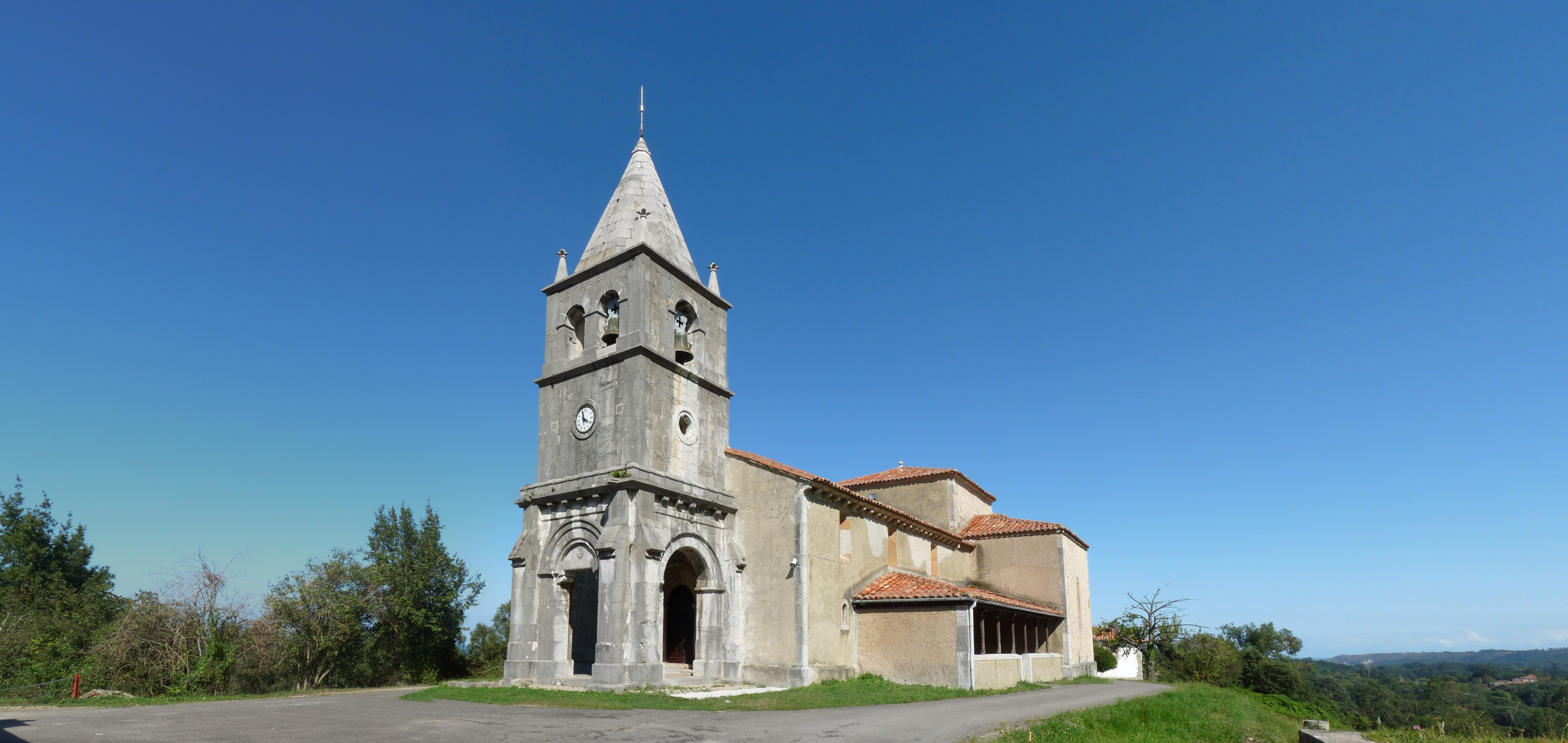
- Saint Peter's, parochial church in Pría

- Location within Spain
- Coordinates: 43°26′32″N 4°59′2″W
- Country: Spain
- Autonomous community: Asturias
- Province: Asturias
- Municipality: Llanes

Population (2023)
  - Total: 502

Pría is the westernmost parish (administrative division) of the municipality of Llanes, in the autonomous community of the Principality of Asturias, in northern Spain.

== Villages ==
There are seven villages in the parish of Pría:

- Belmonte
- Garaña
- Llames
- La Pesa
- Piñeres
- Silviella
- Villanueva

== Geography ==
To the north Pría is bordered by the Cantabrian Sea, to the west by the Guadamía river, which constitutes the border to the municipality of Ribadesella. To the south it is bordered by the Miyares ridge and the parish of Nueva, and to the east by the parish of Nueva and the beach of Cuevas del Mar.

It has a total area of 10,84 km^{2}. The parish is mostly flat. Its highest elevation is at Ronciellu (121m).

== Economy ==
The parish economy has traditionally centred on agriculture and fishing. One of its best known products is a three-milk blue cheese, Queso de Pría.

Today, Pría is an increasingly popular tourism destination and contains many secondary vacation residences. According to El Comercio, a local newspaper, it "is one of the hot spots on the eastern coast of Asturias with the Jesters [...] as its main attraction."

== Beaches and places of interest ==
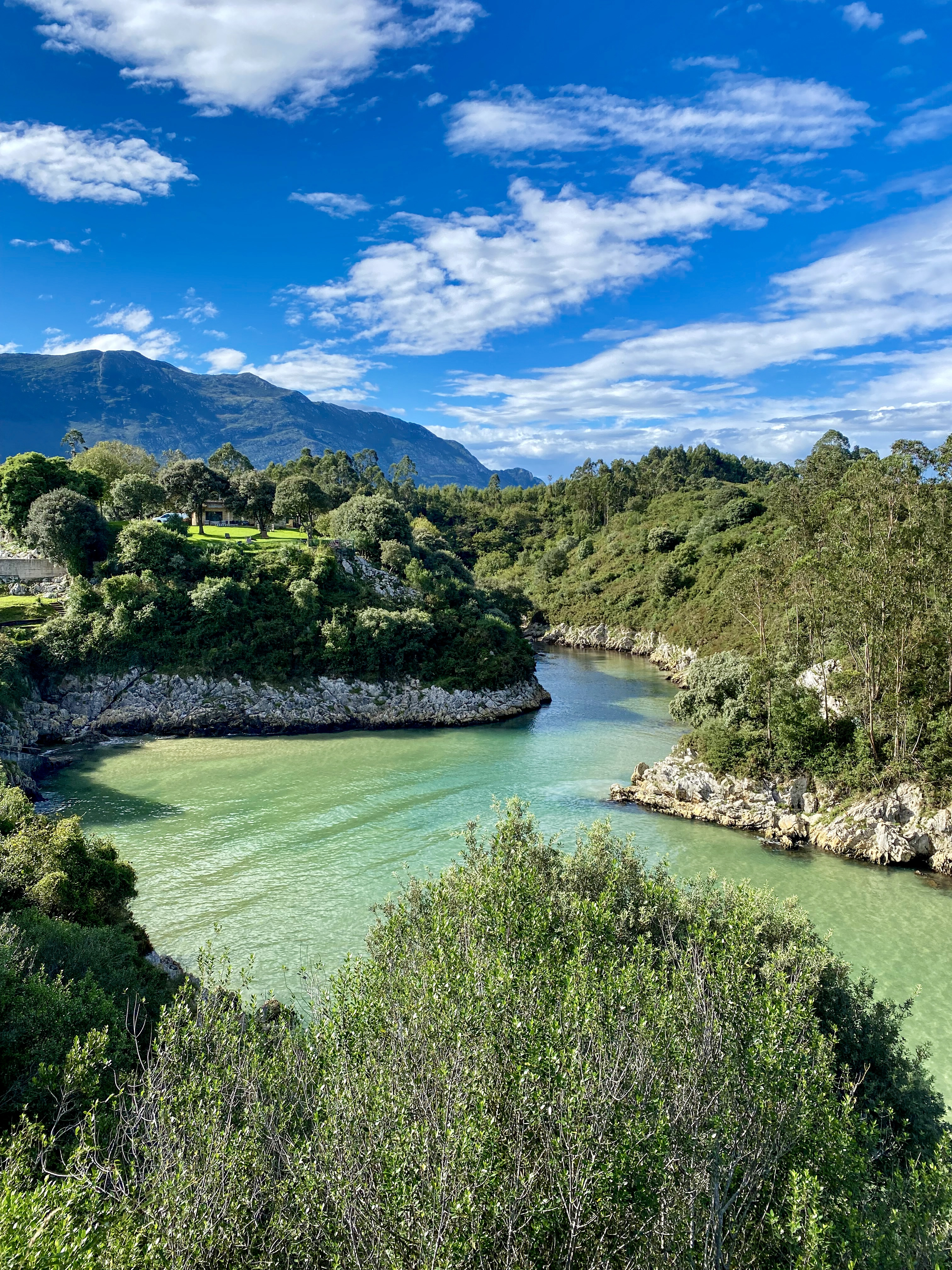
Guadamía river and beach

The parish is home to two inlet beaches, Guadamía in the town of Llames and Canal in Villanueva.

The Jesters of Pría, blowholes that connect the cliff to the sea, are a major tourist attraction.

There is a popular hiking path between Guadamía beach and the beach of Cuevas del Mar along the Jesters of Pría.

The Garaña Palace, in the village of the same name, is a typical Casa Indiano, a grand house built by Spanish emigrants to America, who returned to their homeland. It was built at the end of the 19th century as a summer residence for the Marquises of Argüelles, right on the birthplace of the first Marquis of Argüelles, Ramón Argüelles Alonso.

St. Peter's Church, listed in the Inventory of Architectural Heritage of Asturias, towers above the town of La Pesa and is a frequent stop on the Camino de Santiago.
