= Celoriu =

- Parish
- Location within Spain
- Coordinates: 43.433333°N 4.8°W
- Country: Spain
- Autonomous community: Asturias
- Province: Asturias
- Municipality: Llanes

Population (2023)
  - Total: 404

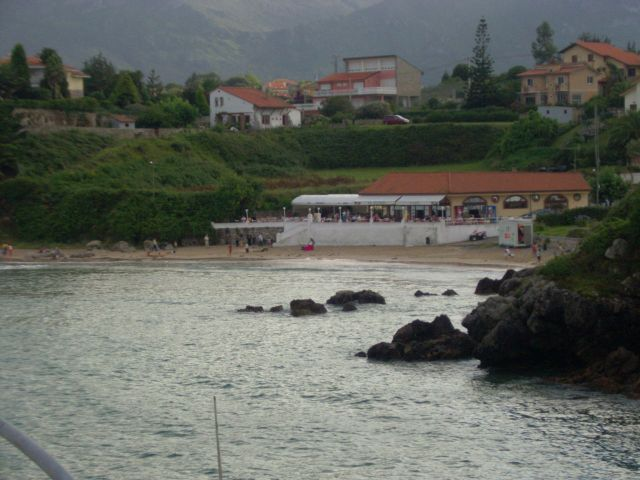
La Palombina beach, in Celoriu.

Celoriu is one of 28 parishes (administrative divisions) in Llanes, a municipality within the province and autonomous community of Asturias, in northern Spain.

Its population as of 2023 is 404.

== Beaches ==
- La Palombina
- Las Cámaras
- Los Curas
- Borizu
- San Martín
- Portiellu
- Troenzo
