= Monasterio de Santa María de Valdediós =

Monastery in Villaviciosa, Spain

Coordinates: 43°26′09″N 5°30′40″W

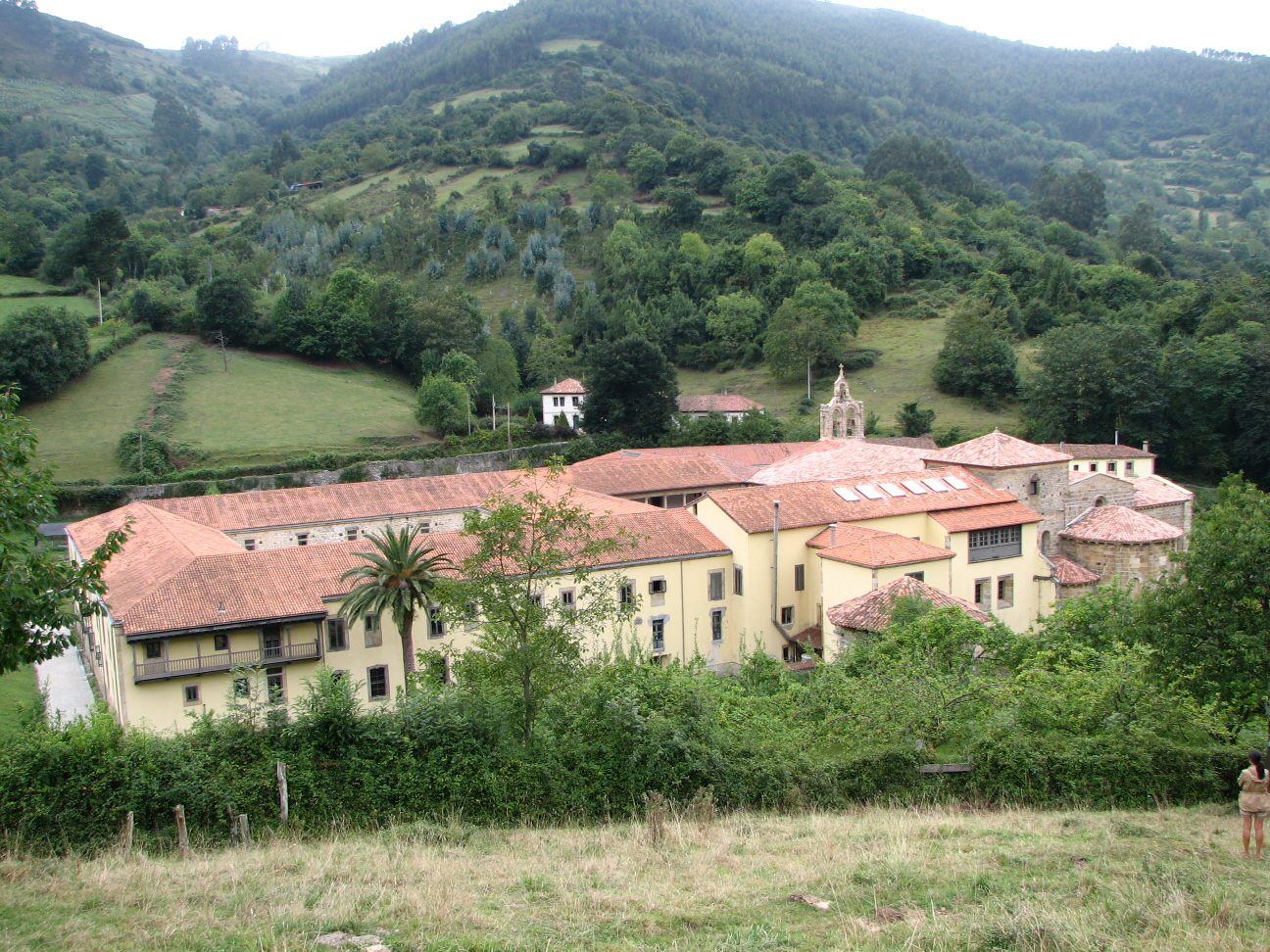
Monasterio de Santa María de Valdediós

Monasterio de Santa María de Valdediós is a 13th-century Cistercian monastery near Villaviciosa of the autonomous community of the Principality of Asturias, in Spain. The monastery and town is on the coast of Biscay Bay in northern Spain.

It is a Site of Cultural Interest, the maximum category of heritage protection in Spanish legislation.

It contains the Iglesia de Santa María (Valdediós). The monastery is next to the Church of San Salvador de Valdediós.

The Spanish term Valdediós means God's valley in English.

== History ==
The monastery was established on November 27, 1200. The stone buildings were built in the Spanish Gothic style

In 1522 it suffered a large flood from the Valdediós river.
