= Nueva (Llanes) =

- Parish
- Location within Spain
- Coordinates: 43°26′N 4°56′W
- Country: Spain
- Autonomous community: Asturias
- Province: Asturias
- Municipality: Llanes

Population (2023)
  - Total: 709

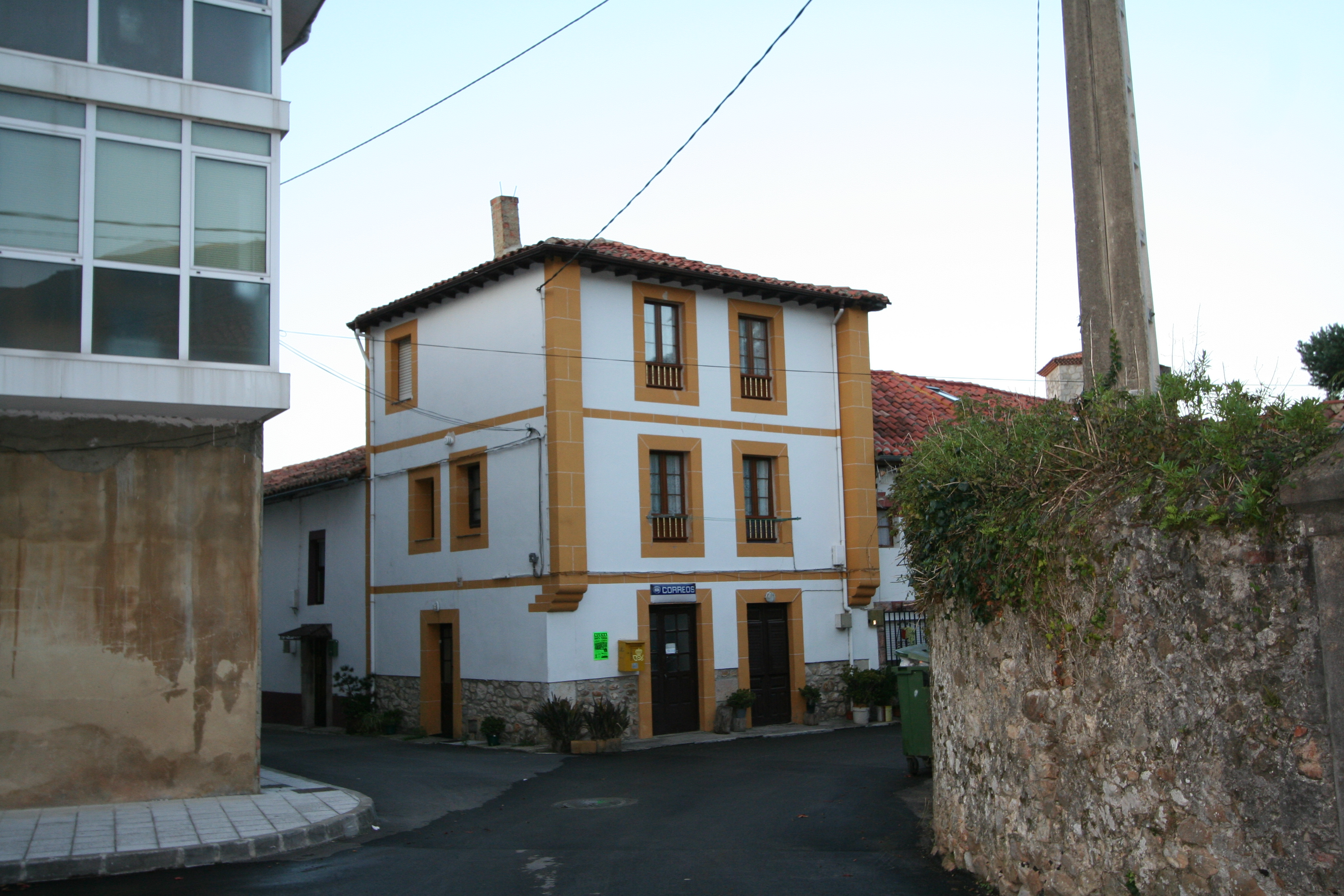
Nueva

Nueva is one of 28 parishes (administrative divisions) in Llanes, a municipality within the province and autonomous community of Asturias, in northern Spain.

Its population as of 2023 is 709.

== Villages ==
- Llamigu
- Nueva
- Obiu
- Picones
- Rinsena
