= Posada, Asturias =

- Parish
- Interactive map of Posada, Asturias
- Country: Spain
- Autonomous community: Asturias
- Province: Asturias
- Municipality: Llanes

Posada is a parish in Llanes municipality, in eastern Asturias, Spain.

The population as of 2023 is 1958.
