= Andrín =

Andrín, Llanes, Asturias, España
- Parish
- Location within Spain
- Country: Spain
- Autonomous community: Asturias
- Province: Asturias
- Municipality: Llanes

Population (2006)
  - Total: 156
  - Density: 5.45/km^{2} (14.1/sq mi)
- Postal code: 33596

Andrín is one of 28 parishes (administrative divisions) in Llanes, a municipality within the province and autonomous community of Asturias, in northern Spain.

== Population ==
Andrín has a population of 156 inhabitants (INE 2006) spread across 87 households and 5.45 km^{2}.

== Monuments ==
In the village, there is the chapel of Nuestra Señora (15th or 16th century) and the San Juan Bautista church (1895).

There are also several mansions among which are the Beltrán (18th century), home of Count Vega del Sella (17th century).

== Villages ==
- Andrín
