= Naves (Llanes) =

- Parish
- Location within Spain
- Coordinates: 43°26′30″N 4°53′22″W
- Country: Spain
- Autonomous community: Asturias
- Province: Asturias
- Municipality: Llanes

Population (2023)
  - Total: 151

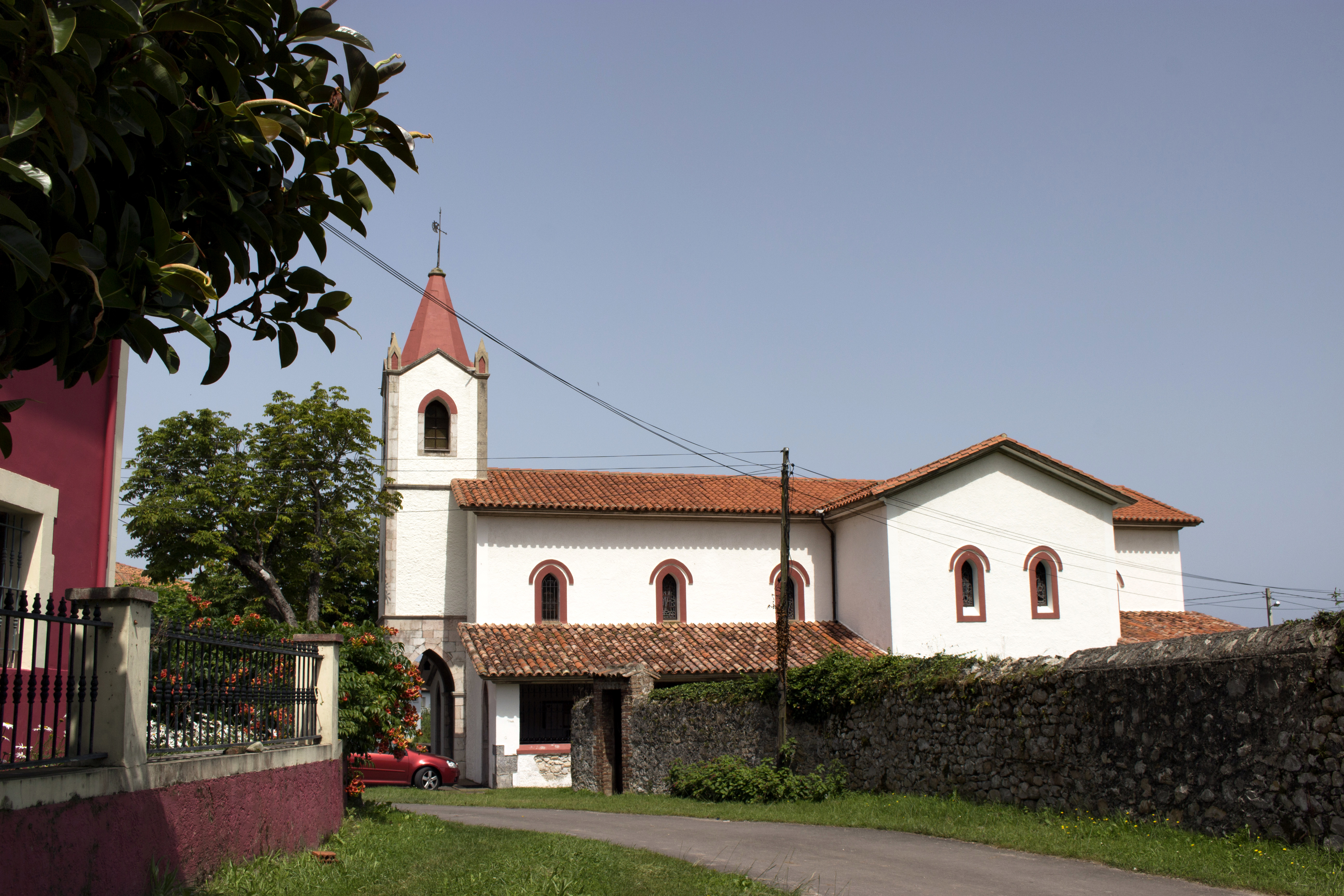
Naves

Naves is one of 28 parishes (administrative divisions) in Llanes, a municipality within the province and autonomous community of Asturias, in northern Spain.

Its population as of 2023 is 151.

== Villages ==
- El Requexu
- El Ríu Montés
- Iyán
- L'Oteru
- La Bolera
- La Bolerina
- La Calle
- La Flor
- La Ḥondera
- La Pedrera
- La Pica
- La Pola
- La Vega
- Marrón
- Samartín
- San Vicenti
- Santana
