= Llanes =

- Municipality
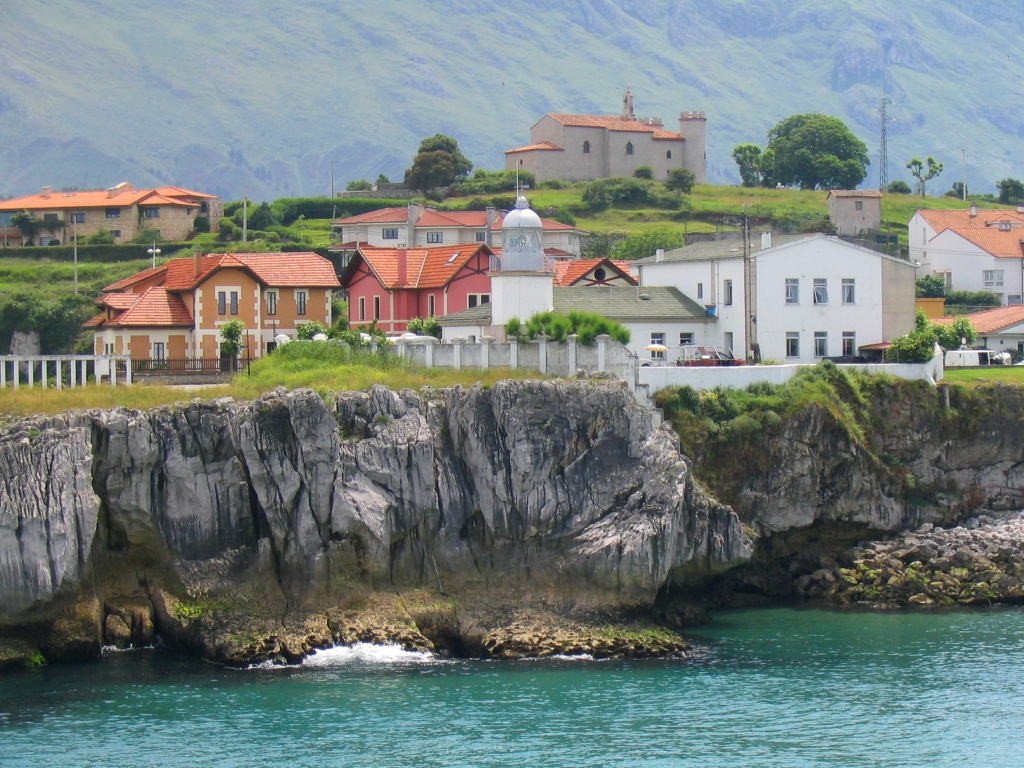
- The Llanes Port's lighthouse in Asturias.

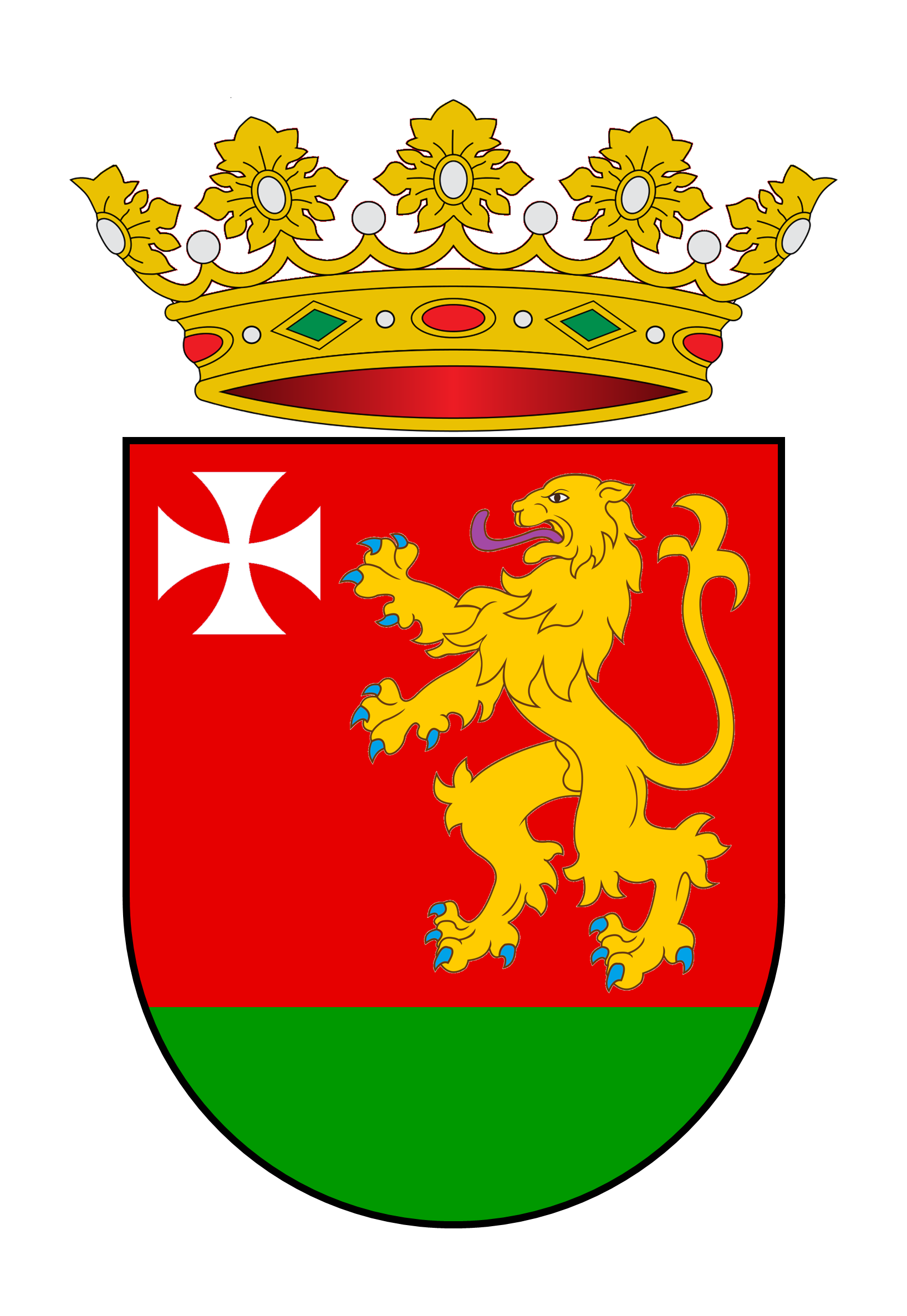
- Flag Coat of arms

- Location of Llanes

- Location in Spain
- Coordinates: 43°25′17″N 4°45′23″W
- Country: Spain
- Autonomous community: Asturias
- Province: Asturias
- Comarca: Oriente
- Capital: Llanes

Government
  - Alcalde: Enrique Riestra Rozas (Vecinos x Llanes)

Area
  - Total: 263.59 km^{2} (101.77 sq mi)
- Elevation: 1,177 m (3,862 ft)

Population (2025-01-01)
  - Total: 13,486
  - Density: 51.163/km^{2} (132.51/sq mi)
- Demonym: Llanisco/a
- Time zone: UTC+1 (CET)
  - Summer (DST): UTC+2 (CEST)
- Postal code: 33500
- Official language(s): Spanish
- Website: Official website

Llanes (the Concejo de Llanes, Conceyu de Llanes in Asturian language) is a municipality of the province of Asturias, in northern Spain. Stretching for about 30 km along the coast at the extreme east of the province, Llanes is bounded to the south by the high ridge of the limestone Sierra del Cuera, which rises to over 1,100 m. The region is part of the Costa Verde (Green Coast) of Spain, which is known for its spectacular coastal scenery, with 32 white sand beaches, and mountains covered with a deep green mantle. Llanes lies to the north of the Picos de Europa, a mountain range whose geology is almost entirely of limestone karst.

Most of the inhabitants of the district live on the coastal plain, on which the largest town is Llanes itself, with a population of about 4,000 out of the total for the district of about 13,000. The folklore, food, and fiestas of the region are famous for their colour and history.

== Town ==
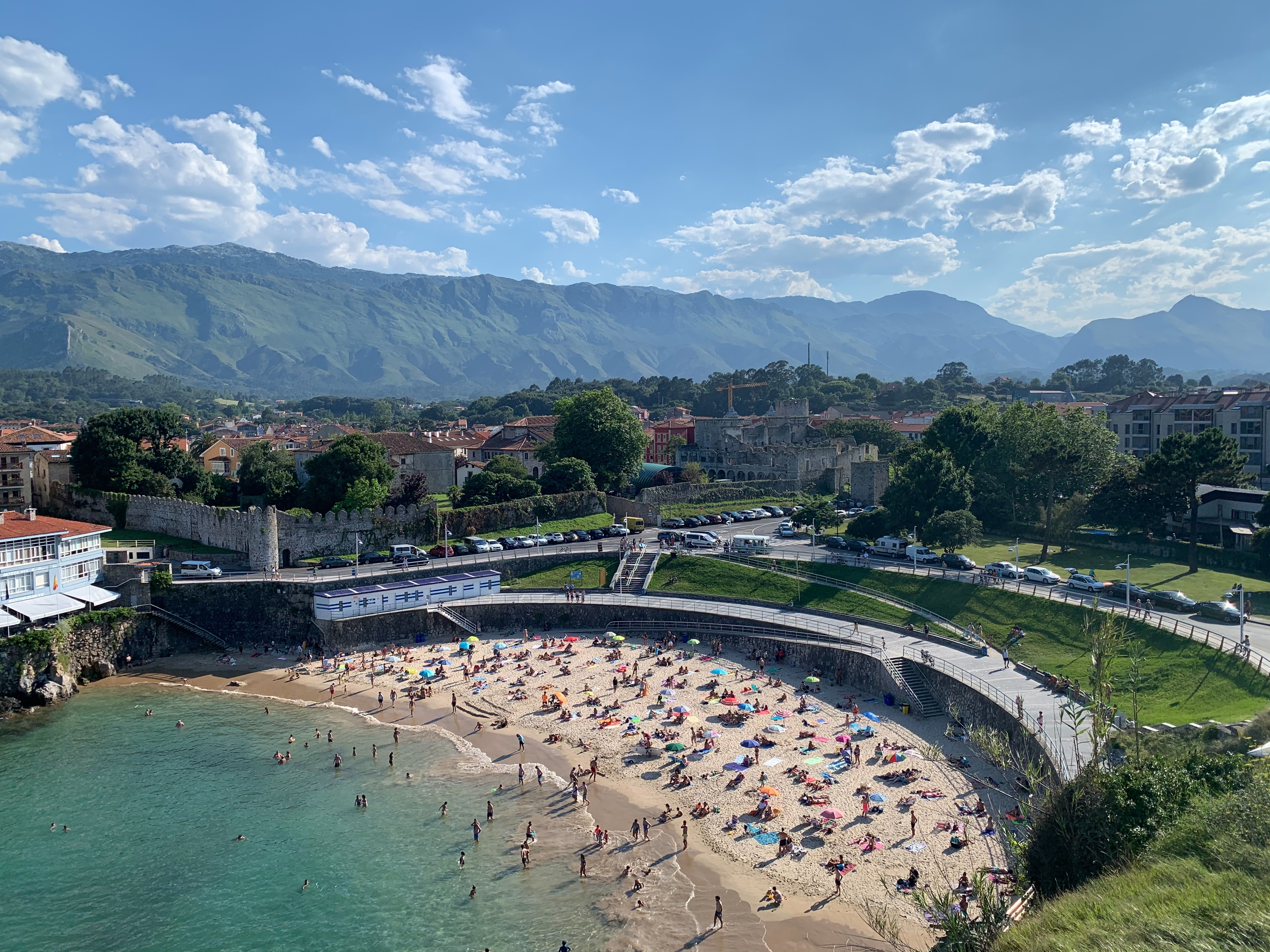
Llanes town beach

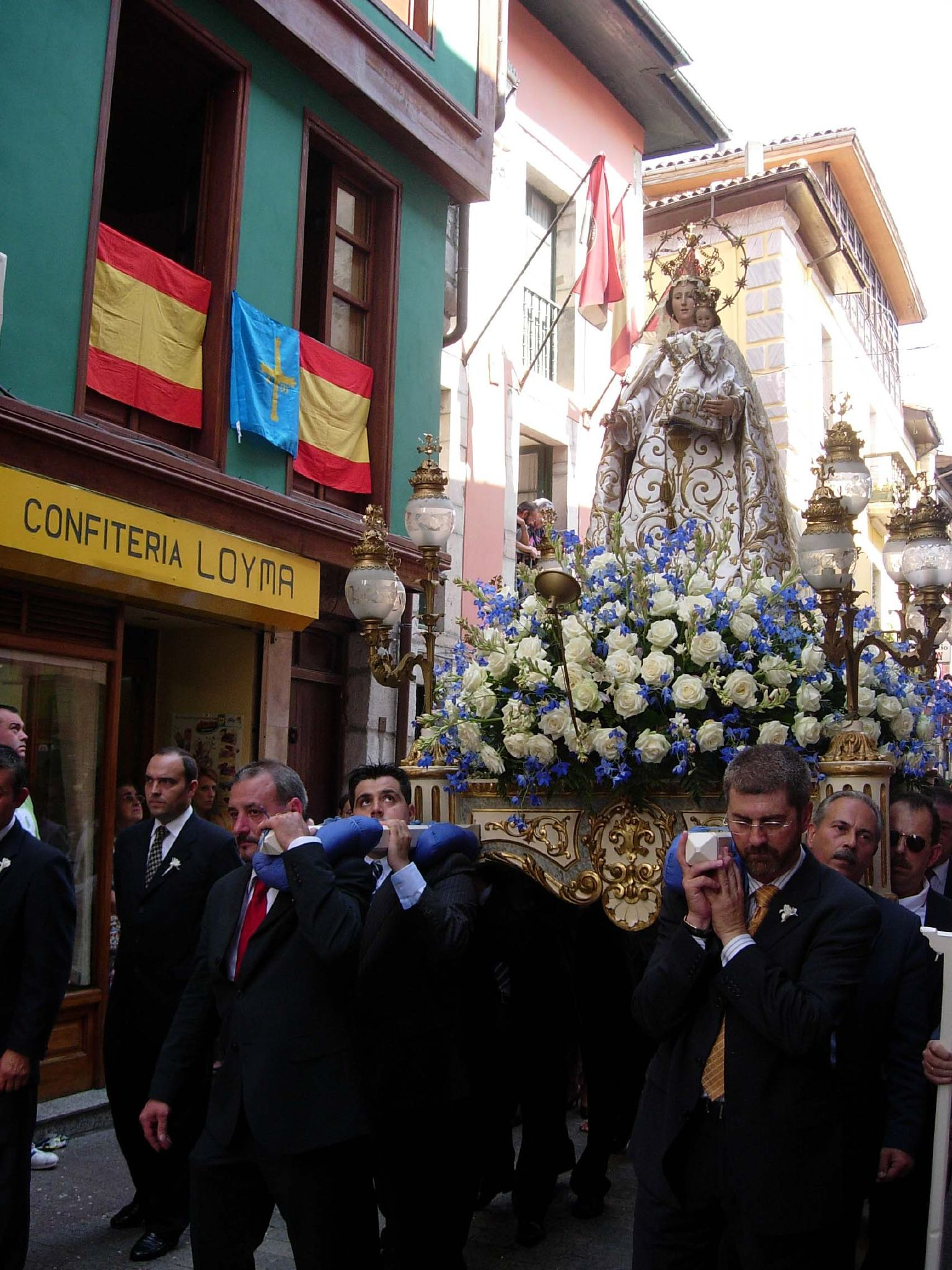
Virgin of La Guía

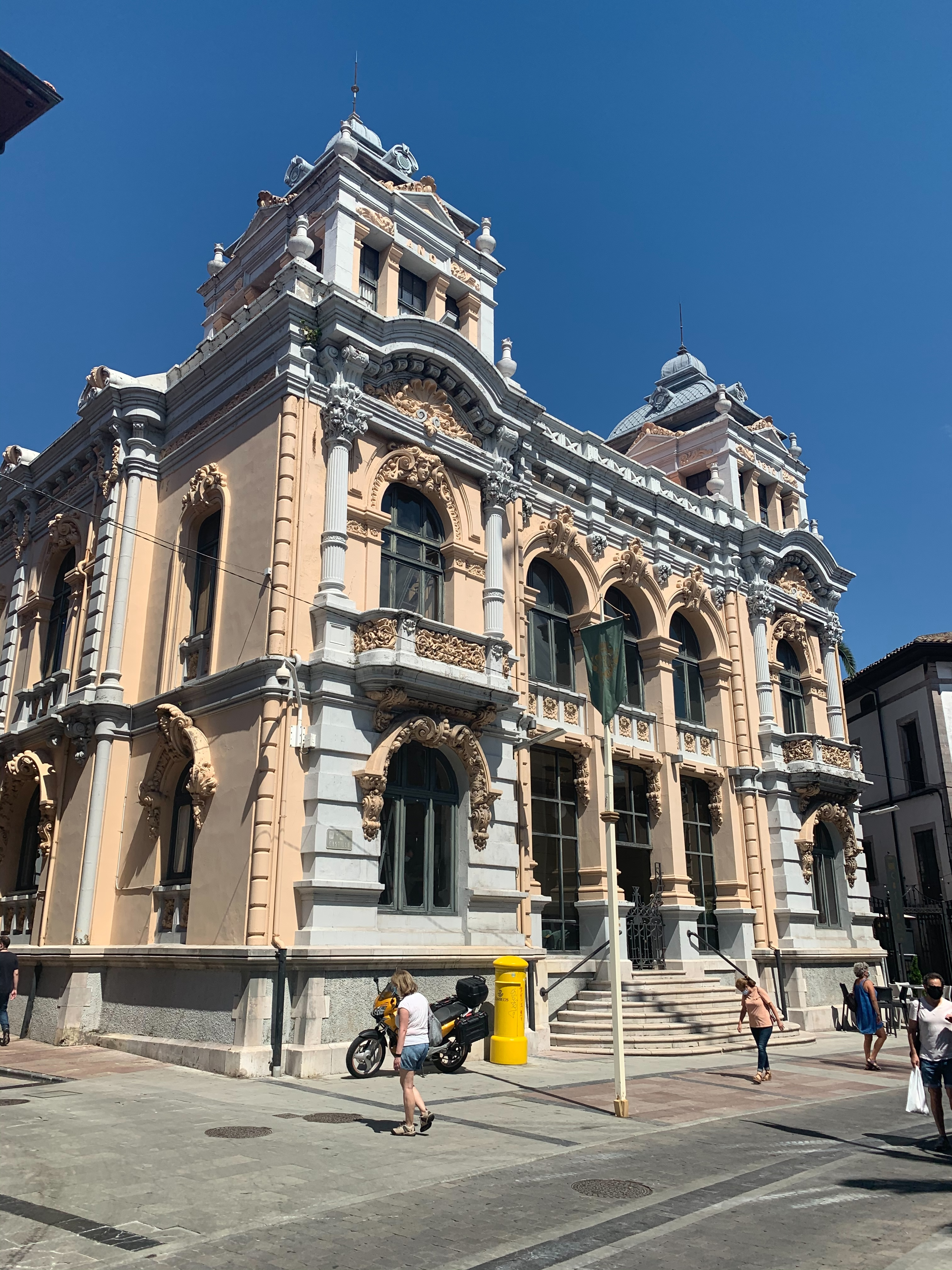
Llanes Casino (formerly Town Hall)

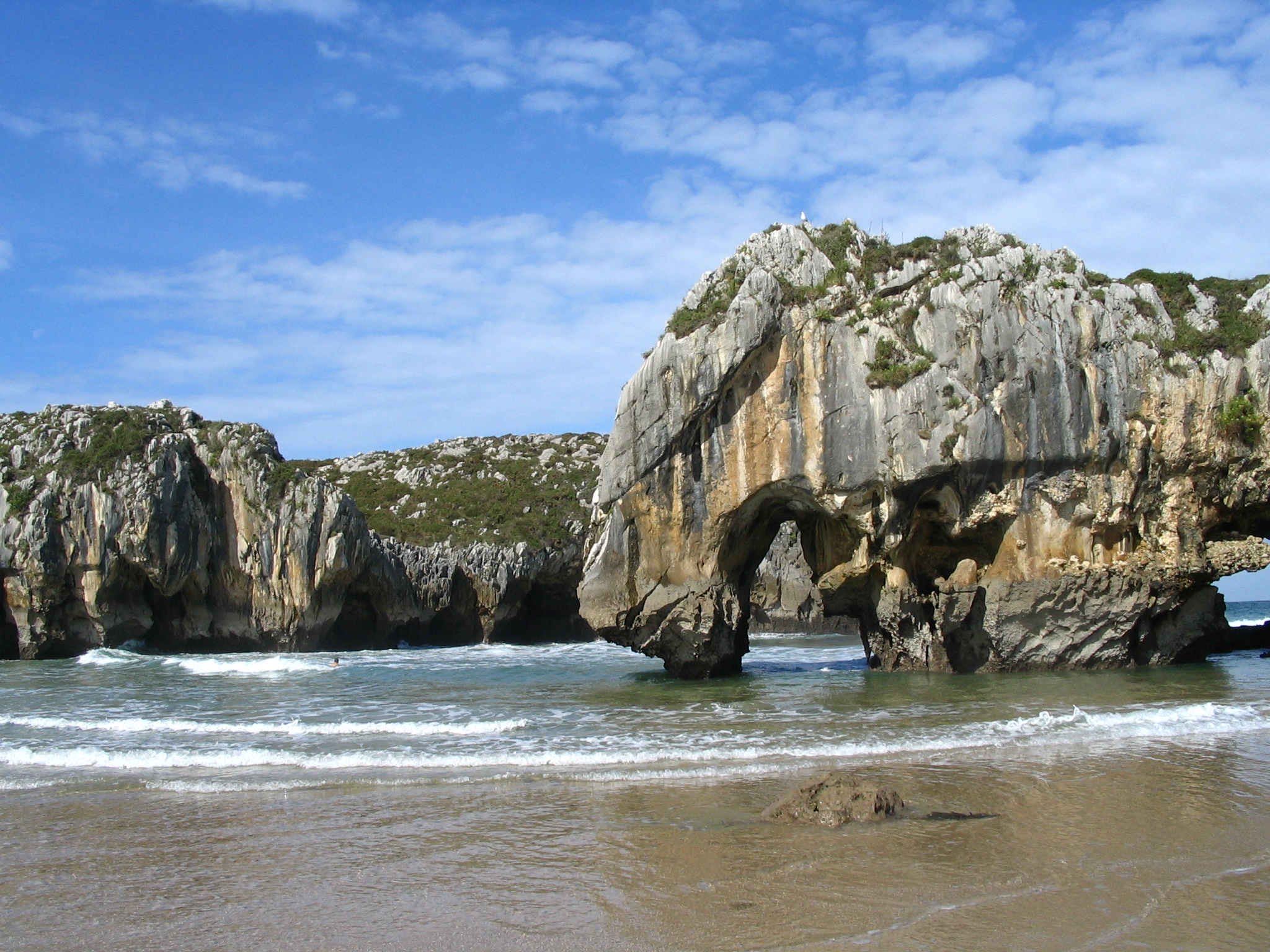
Cuevas del Mar beach

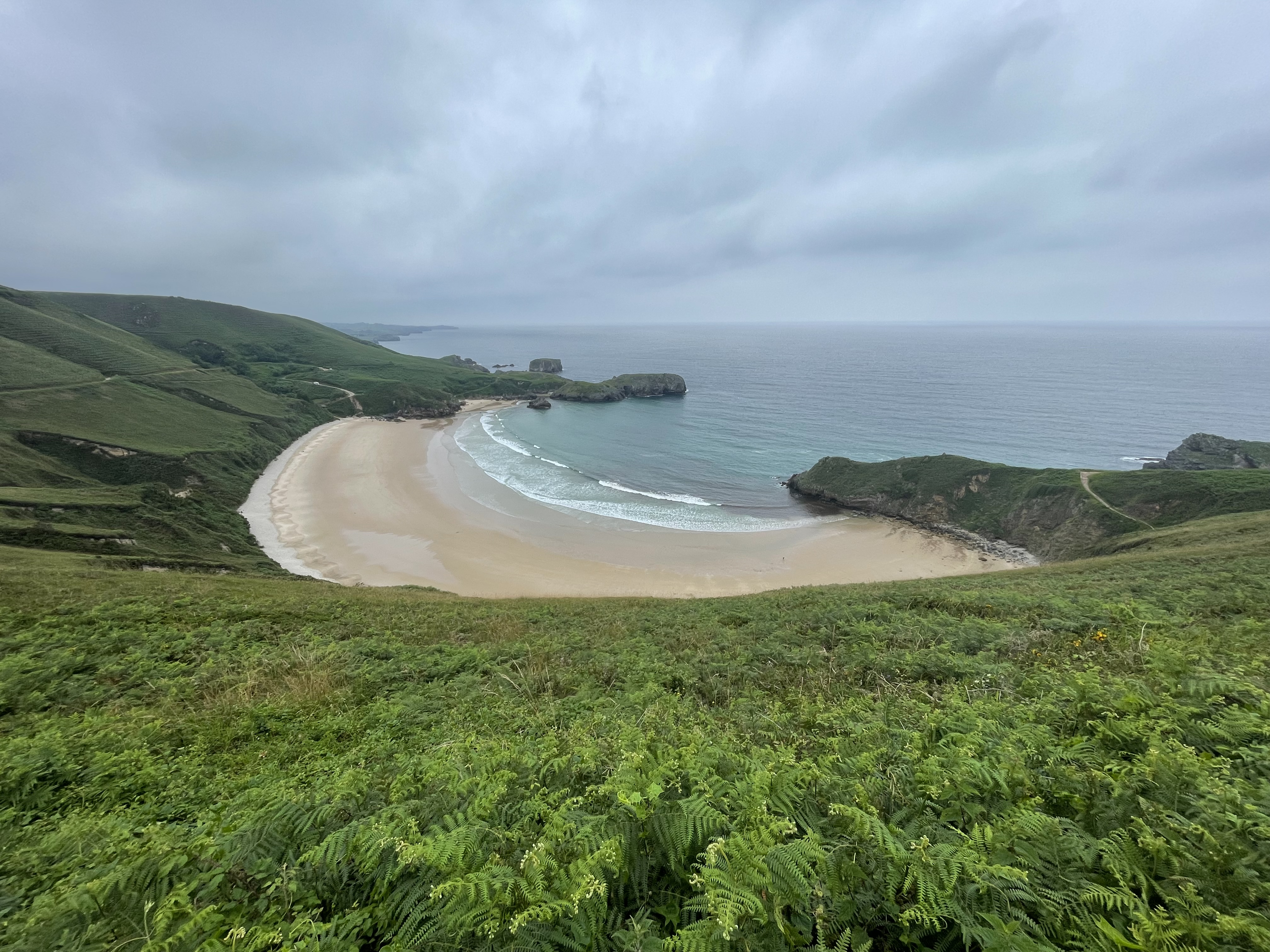
Torimbia beach

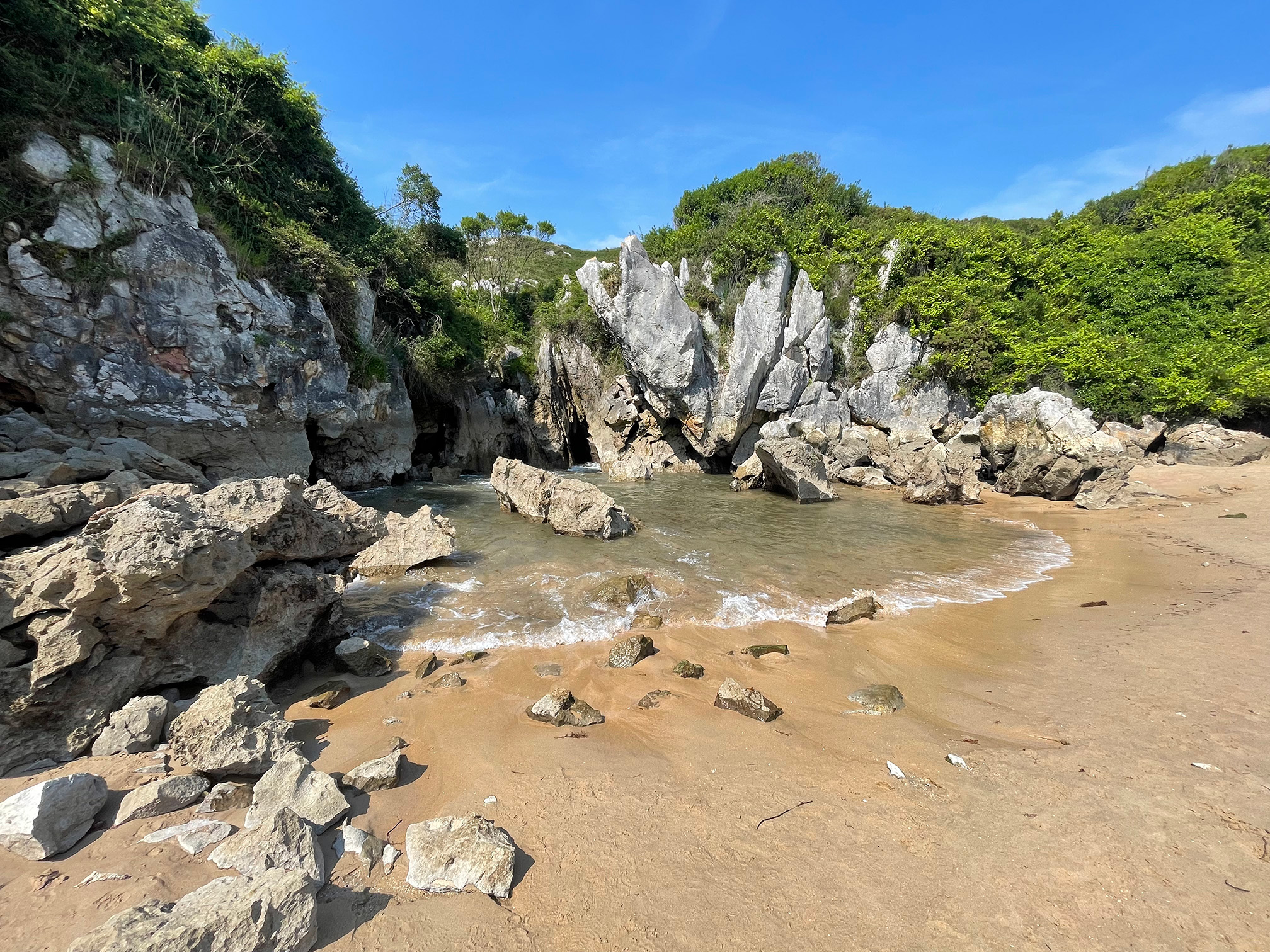
Gulpiyuri beach

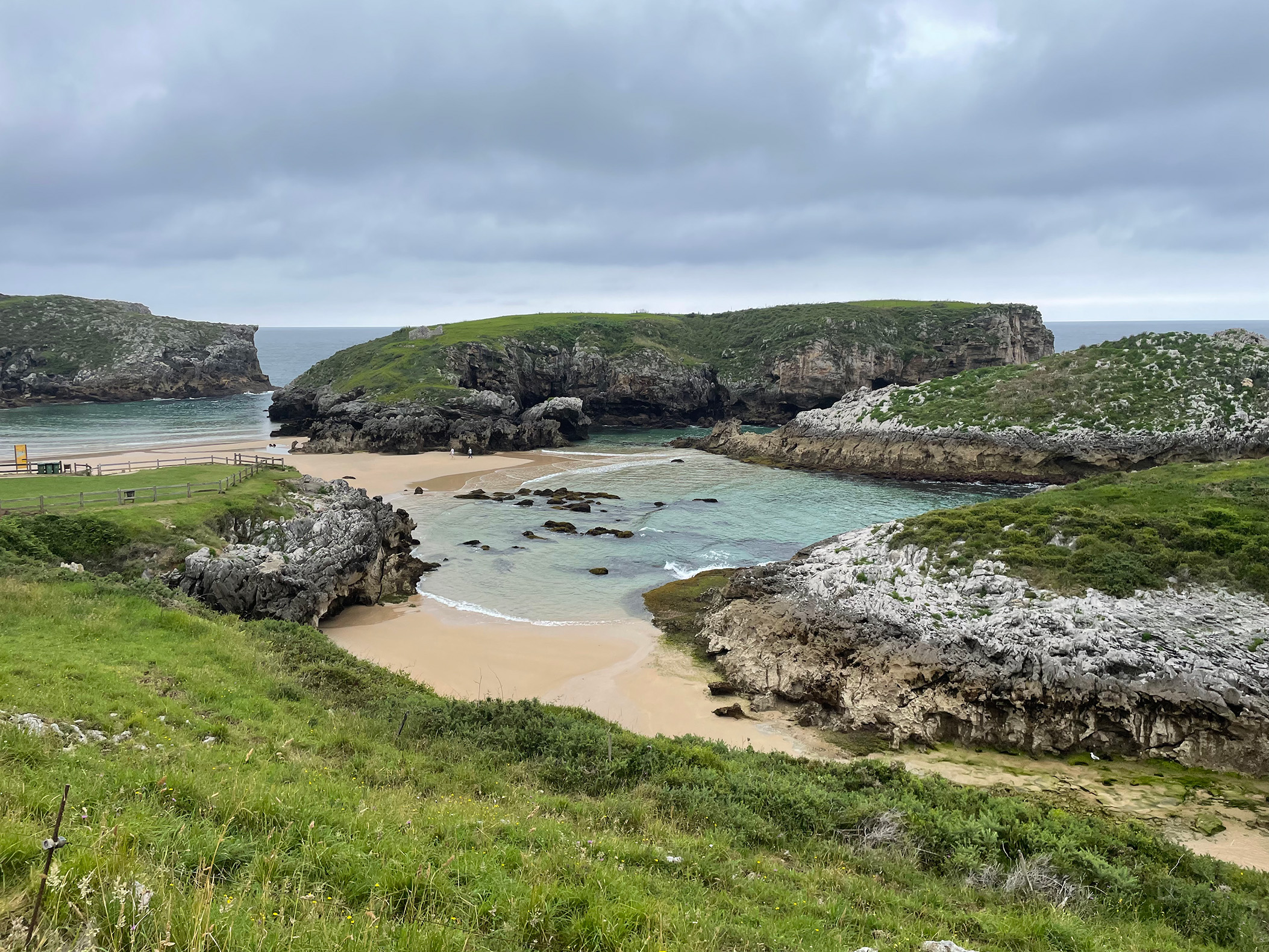
Antilles beach

Llanes is a traditional fishing port, with an active harbour and many notable monuments and traditions; Parts of the surviving town walls date to 1206 with a medieval Tower of Llanes remaining. There is a romanic-gothic Basilica dedicated to the Virgin Mary. One plaque commemorates the 65 sailors from Llanes who sailed on the three ships it fitted out for the Spanish Armada in 1588 (the Santa Ana, the San Nicolas, and the Santelmo). Another plaque commemorates the September 26, 1517 visit of Emperor Charles V who stayed for two nights, when on his way to Valladolid to be crowned King of Castile. In the 1990s the landmark old Theatre (Teatro Benevente), built as part of the main bridge over the river, was pulled down.

Llanes economy is boosted by tourists mostly from the rest of Spain in the summer. The town has traditional shops and restaurants, both in and around the town, and the zona de copas is lively at night in summer. Three beaches and a cliff-top walk, the Paseo de San Pedro, add to the coastal atmosphere. Nearby is the Playa de Gulpiyuri.

== Parishes ==
Llanes is divided into 28 parishes:

- Andrín
- Ardisana
- Barru
- Caldueñu
- Carranzo
- Celoriu
- Cue
- Ḥontoria
- La Borbolla
- Llanes
- Los Caleyos
- Los Carriles
- La Malatería
- Meré
- Naves
- Nueva
- Parres
- Pendueles
- Po
- Porrúa
- Posada de Llanes
- Pría
- Purón
- Rales
- San Roque l'Acebal
- Tresgrandas
- Vibañu
- Vidiago

== Mountains ==
From all of the district of Llanes the view to the south is dominated by the limestone mountain wall, which rises steeply to 744 m at L'Abá. The ridge forming the wall shields the view of the higher Sierra del Cuera above, of which the highest point (in Llanes) is La Peña Blanca, 1177 m. Between the two ridges there are hidden valleys, draining into cave systems. The largest of these valleys is La Llosa de Viango. Unlike the heights of the Picos de Europa further to the south, these valleys are green and pastoral. The mountains are part of the Cordillera Cantábrica, which runs across most of the north and northwest of Spain.

From September 6, 1937 to September 22, 1937, 5,000 men of the Republican forces held off over 33,000 Nationalists, in this area, in an epic resistance which became known as the Battle of El Mazuco.

== Caves ==
The district contains numerous caves, including a site of archaeological interest at Nueva, and the Cueva Bolado (43°24′04″N 4°45′51″W) near La Pereda which also contains ancient art as well as open passages.

There are also several significant 'wild' cave systems, including

- the Bolugo-Caldueñín system under El Mazuco (the Río Belugas, which sinks at (43°22′45″N 4°51′03″W) and resurges at 43°22′48″N 4°51′54″W)
- the Rales system (43°24′43″N 4°53′39″W)
- El Cuevón de Pruneda, near Purón (43°22′39″N 4°43′23″W).

These systems were first systematically explored by speleologists from the Oxford University Cave Club and from Speleogroup.

In addition, it is suspected that there is a significant cave system underlying La Llosa de Viango.

== Fiestas ==
In Llanes itself, the patron saint of the town, Nuestra Señora del Conceyu, is celebrated with a Fiesta on 15 August. In addition, there are three big summer Fiestas in the town: 22 July La Magdalena, 16 August San Roque, and 8 September La Guía. These Fiestas are independently organized by three groups, known as "Bandos", with followers in the Llanes population; these have a long rivalry, and each tries every year to outdo the others and stage the best festivities.

Outside the town, the various parishes and localities in the district celebrate the usual diversity of Fiestas in honour of their patron saints, with emphasis on La Hoguera ("The bonfire"), which consists of the felling of a mountain eucalyptus which is then erected in the village after removing the branches and bark. This is celebrated in several villages, including Celorio, Balmori, and Pancar (where they carry out the entire ritual without the help of their neighbours).

Also famous is the Noche de las Brujas of Barro (a very traditional and popular celebration centred on Asturian mythology), as is the celebration of Santa Ana, the patron saint of Naves, thanks to the free concert given by popular musicians.

== Sport ==
Team	Town	Sport	League	Tier	Stadium/Arena
Club Baloncesto Crossover Llanes	Llanes	Basketball	Segunda Autonómica	7	Polideportivo Municipal de Llanes
Urraca CF (women's)	Posada de Llanes	Football	Femenino Regional	3	Campo de Fútbol Municipal "La Corredoria" (Posada de Llanes)
CD Llanes	Llanes	Football	Tercera División	4	Campo Municipal de San José
Urraca CF (men's)	Posada de Llanes	Football	Regional Preferente	5	Campo de Fútbol Municipal "La Corredoria" (Posada de Llanes)
CD Aguilar Balompié	Bricia (Llanes)	Football	Segunda Regional	7	Campo de Fútbol Municipal "La Corredoria" (Posada de Llanes)
CD San Jorge	Nueva (Llanes)	Football	Segunda Regional	7	Campo Municipal "El Ereba" (Nueva de Llanes)
CD Llanes	Llanes	Futsal	Primera División Regional	6	Polideportivo Municipal de Llanes
AD Playas de Llanes	Llanes	Volleyball	Segunda Asturiana		Polideportivo Municipal de Llanes
Escuela de Voley 9x18 Llanes-Ribadedeva	Llanes/Ribadedeva	Volleyball	School Competitions	-----	------------------------------------------------------------------------------------

== See also ==
- Iglesia de la Virgen de la Guía (Llanes)
- List of municipalities in Asturias
- Capilla de la Magdalena (Llanes)
