= Kurt Bachmann =

Kurt Bachmann may refer to:

- Kurt Bachmann (basketball)
- Kurt Bachmann (politician)
- Kurt Bachmann, namesake of minor planet Kurtbachmann
