= Stalin Prize =

Stalin Prize may refer to:

- State Stalin Prize in science and engineering and in arts, awarded 1941 to 1956, later known as the USSR State Prize
- Stalin Peace Prize, awarded 1949 to 1956, later known as the Lenin Peace Prize
- Stalin Stipend, a form of merit-based academic grant of the 1940s and 1950s in the USSR
