= Ogonek (song) =

Russian song

Ogonek (Russian: Огонёк) is a Russian song about the separation of a man and his girlfriend during The Great Patriotic War. The song's title can be translated as 'a fire'.

== History ==
The theme and lyrics of Ogonek can be traced back to a poem written in 1942 by Mikhail Isakovsky, who later composed the lyrics of the song. The music was written in 1943 by Mikhail Nikonenko. The song was popularized during World War II, as many Soviet soldiers had access to an accordion, and when they rested, they would often play patriotic and emotional songs. This song in particular caught on with the Russian people, and it made it very popular.

== Popularity in Japan ==
The song was very popular in Japan, where it was known as 'Tomoshibi' (Japanese: 灯). It gained popularity alongside the song Katyusha, representative of the wider The Singing Voice of Japan, a musical–political movement in Japan. In 1955, a musical café opened, using the song as part of its branding.

== Lyrics ==
Russian

На позицию девушка
Провожала бойца,
Тёмной ночью простилася
На ступеньках крыльца.
И пока за туманами
Видеть мог паренёк,
На окошке на девичьем
Всё горел огонёк.
И пока за туманами
Видеть мог паренёк,
На окошке на девичьем.
Всё горел огонёк.

Парня встретила славная
Фронтовая семья.
Всюду были товарищи,
Всюду были друзья,
Но знакомую улицу
Позабыть он не мог:
Где ж ты, девушка милая,
Где ж ты, мой огонёк?

И подруга далёкая
Парню весточку шлёт,
Что любовь её девичья
Никогда не умрёт.
Всё, что было загадано,
В свой исполнится срок, —
Не погаснет без времени
Золотой огонёк.

И спокойно и радостно
На душе у бойца,
От такого хорошего
От её письмеца.
И врага ненавистного
Крепче бьёт паренёк,
За советскую Родину
За родной огонёк.
И врага ненавистного
Крепче бьёт паренёк,
За советскую Родину
За родной огонёк.

Transliteration

Na pozitsiyu devushka
Provozhala boytsa,
Tyomnoy noch'yu prostilasya
Na stupen'kakh kryl'tsa.
I poka za tumanami
Videt' mog parenyok,
Na okoshke na devich'yem
Vsyo gorel ogonyok.
I poka za tumanami
Videt' mog parenyok,
Na okoshke na devich'yem
Vsyo gorel ogonyok.

Parnya vstretilа slavnaya
Frontovaya sem'ya.
Vsyudu byli tovarishchi,
Vsyudu byli druz'ya,
No znakomuyu ulitsu
Pozabyt' on ne mog:
Gde zh ty, devushka milyaya,
Gde zh ty, moy ogonyok?

I podruga dalyokaya
Parnyu vestochku shlyot,
Chto lyubov' yeyo devich'ya
Nikogda ne umryot.
Vsyo, chto bylo zagadano,
V svoy ispolnitsya srok, —
Ne pogasnet bez vremeni
Zolotoy ogonyok.

I spokoyno i radostno
Na dushe u boytsa,
Ot takogo khoroshego
Ot yeyo pis'myetsa.
I vraga nenavistnogo
Krepche b'yot parenyok,
Za sovetskuyu Rodinu
Za rodnoy ogonyok.
I vraga nenavistnogo
Krepche b'yot parenyok,
Za sovetskuyu Rodinu
Za rodnoy ogonyok.

English

Once a girl saw her soldier lad
Going back to the front.
Night was dark and she said good-bye
On the steps of her porch.
While he could through the thickest fogs,
See that place left behind
And his lassie's old windowsill,
And her candlelight shine.
While he could through the thickest fogs,
See that place left behind
And his lassie's old windowsill,
And her candlelight shine.

Then the soldier boy met his brave
Wartime strong family.
Friendly faces were everywhere,
Everywhere were his friends,
But he treasured that lass's street's
Unforgettable sight:
So where are you my tender lass,
Where is my candlelight?

So his tender lass far away
Sends a letter so true,
Promising that her maiden love
Shall not come to an end.
All they have ever dreamed about,
Will come true right on time, —
Nothing can ever try and stop
Golden candlelight shine.

Now he feels that his soul's become
Filled with joy, calm and meet .
Having read his girl's cherished lines,
In that letter so sweet.
So that all hateful enemies,
He can more bravely fight,
For his Soviet dear motherland
And his girl's candlelight.
So that all hateful enemies,
He can more bravely fight,
For his Soviet dear motherland
And his girl's candlelight.
