= Herluf Bidstrup =

Danish cartoonist and illustrator

- Born: Christian Hans Herluf Bidstrup; 10 September 1912; Berlin, German Empire
- Died: 26 December 1988 (aged 76); Allerød Municipality, Denmark
- Known for: Caricaturist, political satirist
- Awards: International Lenin Peace Prize, 1964

Herluf Bidstrup (Danish: [ˈhɛɐ̯lɔf ˈpistʁɔp]; 10 September 1912 – 26 December 1988) was a Danish cartoonist and illustrator.

Bidstrup was educated as a painter at the Royal Danish Academy of Fine Arts and throughout his career he authored more than 5,000 cartoons. He was a firm supporter of communism and very much concerned with the international affairs of his time and social satire. However, not all his work revolves around politics and ideology.

== Artwork ==
Bidstrup published his first drawings on his 20th birthday in a notable Danish newspaper, but had exhibited already at the age of 14 in a children's art exhibition in Copenhagen.

As a communist, Bidstrup drew many cartoons about international politics and social themes, as well as subject matter related to the effects of World War II. Large parts of his work however, just captures and presents the humour in everyday life situations. He was employed as a cartoonist at the Danish communist newspaper "Land og Folk" from after the war until his death in 1988 and he caricatured many politicians among his political and satirical cartoons.

Bidstrup travelled extensively throughout his career, in particular in the socialist countries of the Eastern Bloc, most notably East Germany and the Soviet Union where he also produced animated movies and exhibited. During the German occupation of Denmark in World War II he lived in the US, and in his time he was among the most popular and well-known Danish artists abroad. His works are still very popular in Russia and China today.

In addition to his prolific production of cartoons to many different media, Bidstrup also produced posters and illustrated books, including children's books, educational material and his own travelogues. His book "Kinarejse" (1956) about his travels in China has been translated to Russian, Chinese, German and English ("Herluf Bidstrup in China").

Some of his artwork can be experienced at The Workers Museum in Copenhagen.

== Prizes and honors ==
Bidstrup was awarded many prizes and honors, many of which were related to the international socialist and communist movements.

- The International Lenin Peace Prize, 1964
- Honorary member of UNESCOs International Association of Art (IAA/AIAP), 1974
- Honorary member of the USSR Academy of Arts, 1974
- Kulturfondens hæderspris, 1981. A notable Danish art prize.

== Sources ==
- Kunstindeks Danmark: Herluf Bidstrup (in Danish)
- Bidstrup (in Russian)
