= Wagner Coradin =

Brazilian footballer (born 1989)

Wagner
Personal information
- Full name: Wagner Aparecido Coradin Junior
- Date of birth: 3 October 1989 (age 37)
- Place of birth: Barretos, Brazil
- Height: 1.96 m (6 ft 5 in)
- Position: Goalkeeper

Team information
- Current team: Sergipe

Youth career
- 2006–2009: Mirassol

Senior career*
Years	Team	Apps	(Gls)
2009–2010	Mirassol	0	(0)
2010	→ Corinthians Alagoano (loan)	2	(0)
2010	União São João	0	(0)
2010	→ Independente de Limeira (loan)	6	(0)
2011–2012	Destroyers		
2013	Grêmio Barueri	10	(0)
2014	Nacional-AM	4	(0)
2014	Olímpia	16	(0)
2015	Nacional-AM	4	(0)
2016–2018	Ituano	3	(0)
2019	Campinense	19	(0)
2020	ABC	0	(0)
2020–2021	Ferroviária	2	(0)
2022–2023	Portuguesa	1	(0)
2023–	Sergipe	0	(0)
- * Club domestic league appearances and goals as of 20:39, 3 December 2022 (UTC)

Wagner Aparecido Coradin Junior (born 3 October 1989), known as Wagner Coradin or just Wagner, is a Brazilian footballer who plays as a goalkeeper for Sergipe.

== Club career ==
Born in Barretos, São Paulo, Wagner was a Mirassol youth graduate. He made his senior debut in the 2009 Copa Paulista with the club, before joining Corinthians Alagoano on loan for the 2010 Campeonato Alagoano.

In March 2010, Wagner signed for União São João, but after failing to play a single minute for the side, he was loaned to Independente de Limeira in June. He subsequently moved abroad, joining Destroyers in the Liga Nacional B; in that season, the club reached the promotion/relegation play-offs, but failed to achieve promotion as he scored an own goal in the last match.

Wagner left Destroyers in December 2012, and returned to his home country with Grêmio Barueri in the Série C. He signed for Nacional-AM ahead of the 2014 season, before returning to his native state with Olímpia.

Wagner returned to Nacional on 6 December 2014, but was mainly a backup option. He was presented at Ituano on 17 December 2015, being always a second-choice during his three-year period at the club.

On 8 November 2018, Wagner was announced at Campinense for the 2019 campaign. He gained national notoriety in a Campeonato Paraibano match against Botafogo-PB, as he kneeled down to be interviewed by a journalist with limited mobility and smaller height.

On 11 October 2019, Wagner agreed to a contract with ABC, but moved to Ferroviária the following 24 January. A backup to Saulo, he signed for Portuguesa on 7 December 2021.

Wagner spent his spell at Lusa as a second-choice behind Thomazella, winning the 2022 Campeonato Paulista Série A2.

== Career statistics ==
As of 3 December 2022

Club	Season	League			State League		Cup		Continental		Other		Total	
Club	Season	Division	Apps	Goals	Apps	Goals	Apps	Goals	Apps	Goals	Apps	Goals	Apps	Goals
Mirassol	2009	Paulista	—		0	0	—		—		2 (Note: Appearance(s) in Copa Paulista)	0	2	0
Corinthians Alagoano (loan)	2010	Alagoano	—		2	0	—		—		—		2	0
União São João	2010	Paulista A2	—		0	0	—		—		—		0	0
Independente de Limeira (loan)	2010	Paulista 2ª Divisão	—		6	0	—		—		—		6	0
Grêmio Barueri	2013	Série C	8	0	2	0	0	0	—		—		10	0
Nacional-AM	2014	Amazonense	—		4	0	1	0	—		0	0	5	0
Olímpia	2014	Paulista 2ª Divisão	—		16	0	—		—		—		16	0
Nacional-AM	2015	Série D	1	0	3	0	0	0	—		—		4	0
Ituano	2016	Série D	0	0	0	0	—		—		6	0	6	0
Ituano	2017	Série D	0	0	2	0	—		—		—		2	0
Ituano	2018	Paulista	—		1	0	0	0	—		—		1	0
Ituano	Total		0	0	3	0	0	0	—		6	0	9	0
Campinense	2019	Série D	5	0	14	0	1	0	—		2 (Note: Appearance(s) in Copa do Nordeste)	0	22	0
ABC	2020	Série D	0	0	0	0	0	0	—		0	0	0	0
Ferroviária	2020	Série D	1	0	0	0	0	0	—		—		1	0
Ferroviária	2021	Série D	1	0	0	0	—		—		—		1	0
Ferroviária	Total		2	0	0	0	0	0	—		—		2	0
Portuguesa	2022	Paulista A2	—		1	0	—		—		4	0	5	0
Portuguesa	2023	Paulista	—		0	0	—		—		—		0	0
Portuguesa	Total		—		1	0	—		—		4	0	5	0
Career total			14	0	83	0	2	0	0	0	43	0	142	0

== Honours ==
Nacional

- Campeonato Amazonense: 2014, 2015

Portuguesa

- Campeonato Paulista Série A2: 2022

Portuguesa Santista

- Copa Paulista: 2023
