= Herbert Mies =

German politician (1929–2017)

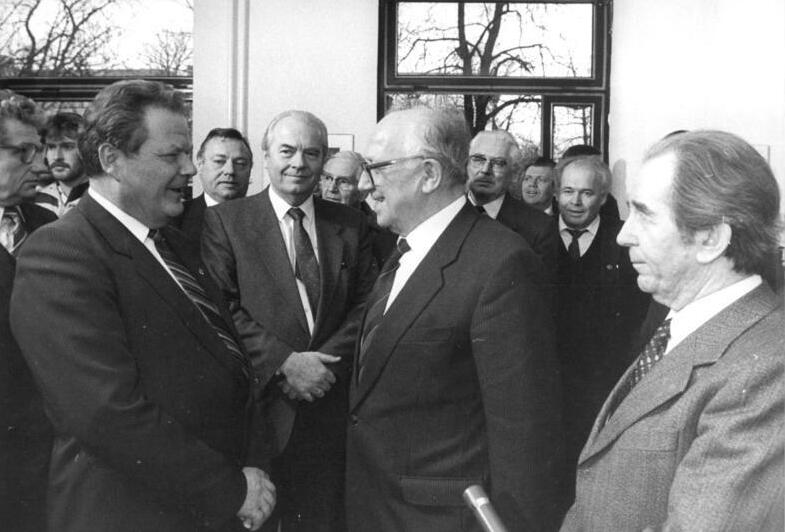
- Mies (left) receives a delegation from East Germany headed by Horst Sindermann in Bonn, 1986

Leader of the German Communist Party
- In office 1973–1990
- Preceded by: Kurt Bachmann
- Succeeded by: Heinz Stehr

Personal details
- Born: February 23, 1929 Mannheim, Weimar Republic
- Died: January 14, 2017 (aged 87) Mannheim, Germany
- Party: German Communist Party (1968–); Communist Party of Germany (1945–1956)
- Other political affiliations: Socialist Unity Party of Germany
- Spouse: Gerda Mies
- Education: Parteihochschule Karl Marx
- Awards: Lenin Peace Prize (1985/1986)

Herbert Mies (23 February 1929 – 14 January 2017) was a German politician. He joined the Communist Party of Germany in 1945. Mies was elected chairman of the (West) German Communist Party in 1973. He was awarded the Lenin Peace Prize in 1985/1986. Mies resigned from his position as party chairman in October 1989.

Mies died on 14 January 2017 in his hometown of Mannheim at the age of 87.
