= Peter Ayodele Curtis Joseph =

Nigerian nationalist (1920–2006)

Peter Ayodele Curtis Joseph (8 November 1920 – 15 December 2006) was born in Ikare, Nigeria. He was a left nationalist and the first Nigerian to receive a Lenin Peace Prize in 1965. In May 1961, Ayodele, together with Gogo Chu Nzeribe, Tanko Yakassai, M.O Johnson, J.B.K Thomas, and a few others, organized a Leftist group called the Nigerian People's Party in Lagos. The group opposed regionalism and declared their belief in the creation of a " Union of African States."

== Publications ==
Peter Ayodele Curtis-Joseph published several works under the pen name "Omorodion Omoregbe". These books include:

| Publication | Year |
|---|---|
| Africa Through German Spectacles | 1963 |
| Six Secrets of Frank Buchman | 1964 |
| The Negro and American Democracy | 1964 |
| Nazism- Dead or Alive? | 1965 |
| Beware of American Friendship. | 1966 |
