= Festa do Peão de Barretos =

Rodeo held in Barretos, São Paulo, Brazil

Coordinates: 20°30′35.38″S 48°35′45.39″W

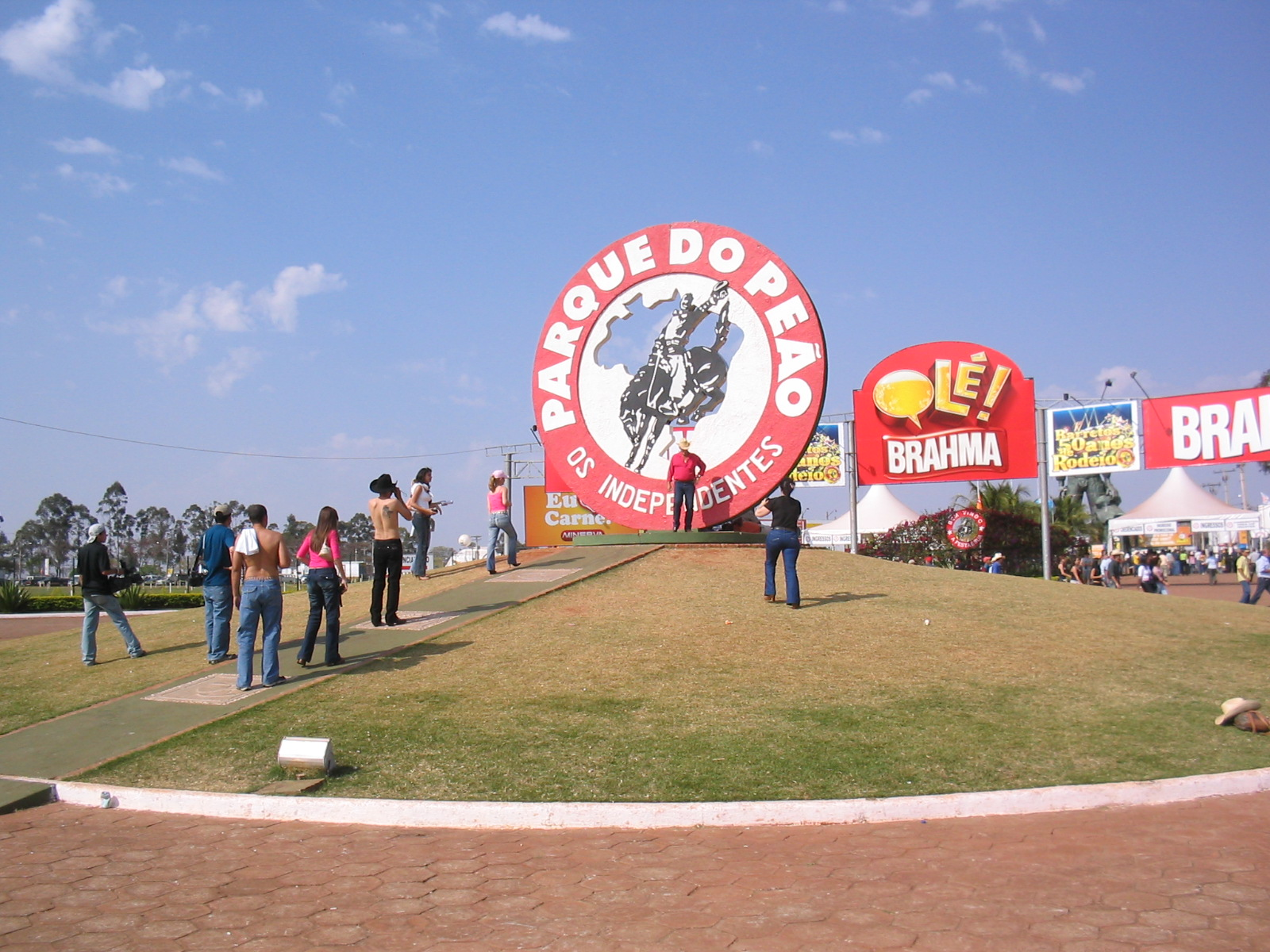
Entrance to the Festa do Peão

The Festa do Peão de Barretos (Portuguese for Cowboy Festival of Barretos) is a rodeo festival in Barretos, São Paulo, Brazil. It has traditionally been organized and promoted by the social club Os Independentes (The Independents). It is the largest rodeo in the Southern Hemisphere, attracting around one million people every year.

== History ==
The festival has its origins in the transfer of cattle from pasturing in the nearby states of Minas Gerais, Goiás, Mato Grosso do Sul, and Mato Grosso to slaughterhouses in Barretos. The cowboys in the "entourages" that led the herds would meet in the afternoons and compete with each other to see who could ride the most spirited horses - the precursor to today's competition. The more difficult tradition of riding bulls instead of horses was brought from the United States.

In 1955, in Barretos, a group of bachelors organized the first recorded Festa do Peão de Boiadeiro. Since that time, the festival has become world-famous for its scale, and the high quality of cowboys, cowgirls, horses and bulls. The festival takes place every August, coinciding with the anniversary of the founding of Barretos, August 25. It continues to be organized by The Independents.

2005 was the 50th annual Festa. Until 1984, the festivities took place in Paulo de Lima Park, in the center of Barretos, where memorable expositions of cattle took place during the 1960s through the 1980s. Since 1985, Os Independentes have held the event in a 110-hectare park with a stadium large enough to hold 35,000 people, designed by renowned Brazilian architect Oscar Niemeyer.

During its history, the festival has brought to Brazil a number of international superstar artists, such as Shakira, Garth Brooks, Alan Jackson, Gloria Gaynor, A-Ha, Mariah Carey and Shania Twain.

Twain's concert was probably the festival's most notable attraction to date, as Festa do Peão had been trying to negotiate a show with the singer for over 20 years, and agreed to pay a R$4 million fee for her to come to Brazil. The official announcement of her concert was made on the Festa do Peão page on February 26, 2018, and reached a mark of 1.3 million views on Facebook alone. One million people visited Parque do Peão on the weekend of the event. Brazilian country star Marília Mendonça and pop singer Bastian Baker opened Twain's concert, which started at midnight for an audience of 55,000. Media outlets in Brazil, such as G1, reviewed the concert as one of the best ever performed at the festival.
