= Elisa Branco =

Brazilian peace activist (1912–2001)

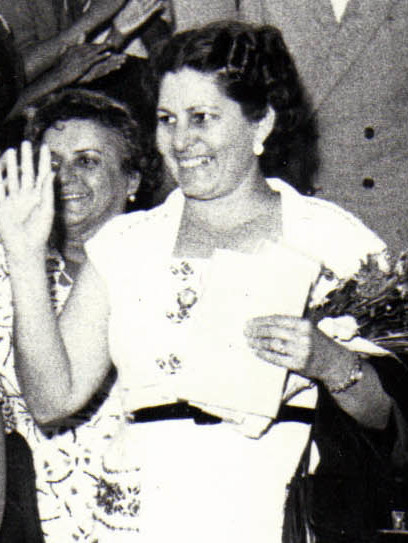
- Born: December 29, 1912; Barretos, São Paulo (state), Brazil
- Died: June 8, 2001 (aged 88); São Paulo
- Occupations: Seamstress, political activist
- Political party: PCB
- Awards: Lenin Peace Prize (1953)

Elisa Branco Batista (December 29, 1912 – June 8, 2001) was a Brazilian Communist militant and peace activist, awarded with the Lenin Peace Prize in 1953.

== Life ==
Barros was born in Barretos, São Paulo, to a Portuguese father who owned a boarding house; she lived with her brothers in a house with 21 rooms. When she was a child, her father died of illness and the family had to rent the rooms of his house to refugees arriving from Europe for survive. She moved to São Paulo in 1948 where she learned sewing and began working in pacifist campaigns after discovering and joining the Brazilian Communist Party after the arrest of Luís Carlos Prestes. That year, she was imprisoned together with the other members of the 1st São Paulo state Textile Workers' Congress.

She joined the Federation of Women of São Paulo (Portuguese: Federação das Mulheres de São Paulo) of which she became one of the executives and organized protest actions against the sending of Brazilian soldiers to Korea. At the same time, she was the vice-president of the Brazilian Peace Movement.

On September 7, 1950, during the festivities of the Independence of Brazil at the Vale do Anhangabaú in São Paulo, she joined a gathering of activists carrying a banner saying: "Os soldados, nossos filhos não irão para a Coréia" ("The soldiers, our children will not go to Korea") to protest against Brazil's support for the United States in the Korean War. Arrested, she was sentenced to four years and three months in prison, which she spent in Tiradentes prison. During her imprisonment, the lawyer for the Brazilian Communist Party filed a habeas corpus for her, but it was rejected. In prison, she teaches her fellow inmates to read, sewing skills, and body hygiene. She is finally released in October 1951.

In 1953, she left for Europe to attend the Congress for Peace in Moscow where she received the Lenin Peace Prize. From 1951 to 1965, she was member of the World Council for Peace.

During the 1964 Brazilian coup d'etat, she was arrested again by the soldiers but only remained in detention for eight days. In 1971, she was arrested again by the military and stayed 3 days in prison.

She died on July 8, 2001, in São Paulo, at 88 years old.
