= Douglas Camilo =

Brazilian footballer (born 1990)

Personal information
- Full name: Douglas Camilo da Silva
- Date of birth: November 15, 1990 (age 35)
- Place of birth: Barretos, Brazil
- Height: 1.79 m (5 ft 10 1/2 in)
- Position: Midfielder

Team information
- Current team: Inter de Bebedouro

Youth career
- Grêmio Prudente

Senior career*
Years	Team	Apps	(Gls)
2010	Grêmio Prudente	1	(0)
2011–	Inter de Bebedouro		
- * Club domestic league appearances and goals as of October 16, 2010 ‡ National team caps and goals as of October 16, 2010

Douglas Camilo da Silva, known as Douglas Camilo born in the Barretos, is a midfielder who plays in the Inter de Bebedouro.

== Career ==
Plays in the Inter de Bebedouro.

=== Career statistics ===
(Correct as of October 16, 2010)

Club	Season	State League		Brazilian Série A		Copa do Brasil		Copa Libertadores		Copa Sudamericana		Total	
Club	Season	Apps	Goals	Apps	Goals	Apps	Goals	Apps	Goals	Apps	Goals	Apps	Goals
Grêmio Prudente	2010	0	0	1	0	-	-	-	-	-	-	1	0
Total		0	0	1	0	-	-	-	-	-	-	1	0

== Contract ==
- Inter de Bebedouro.

== See also ==
- Football in Brazil
- List of football clubs in Brazil
