= Akiko Seki =

Japanese soprano (1899–1973)

- 関鑑子
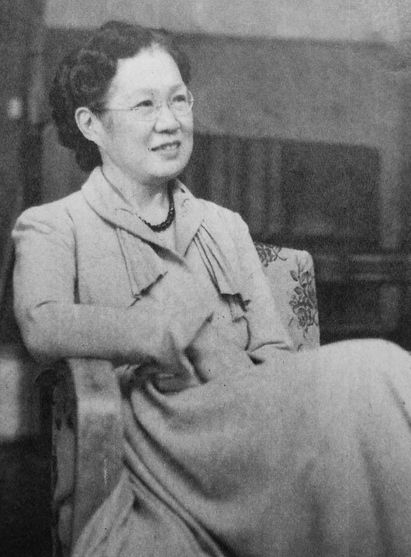
- Akiko Seki, c. 1955
- Born: September 8, 1899; Tokyo, Japan
- Died: May 2, 1973 (aged 73); Tokyo, Japan
- Occupation: Singer
- Years active: 1921–1973

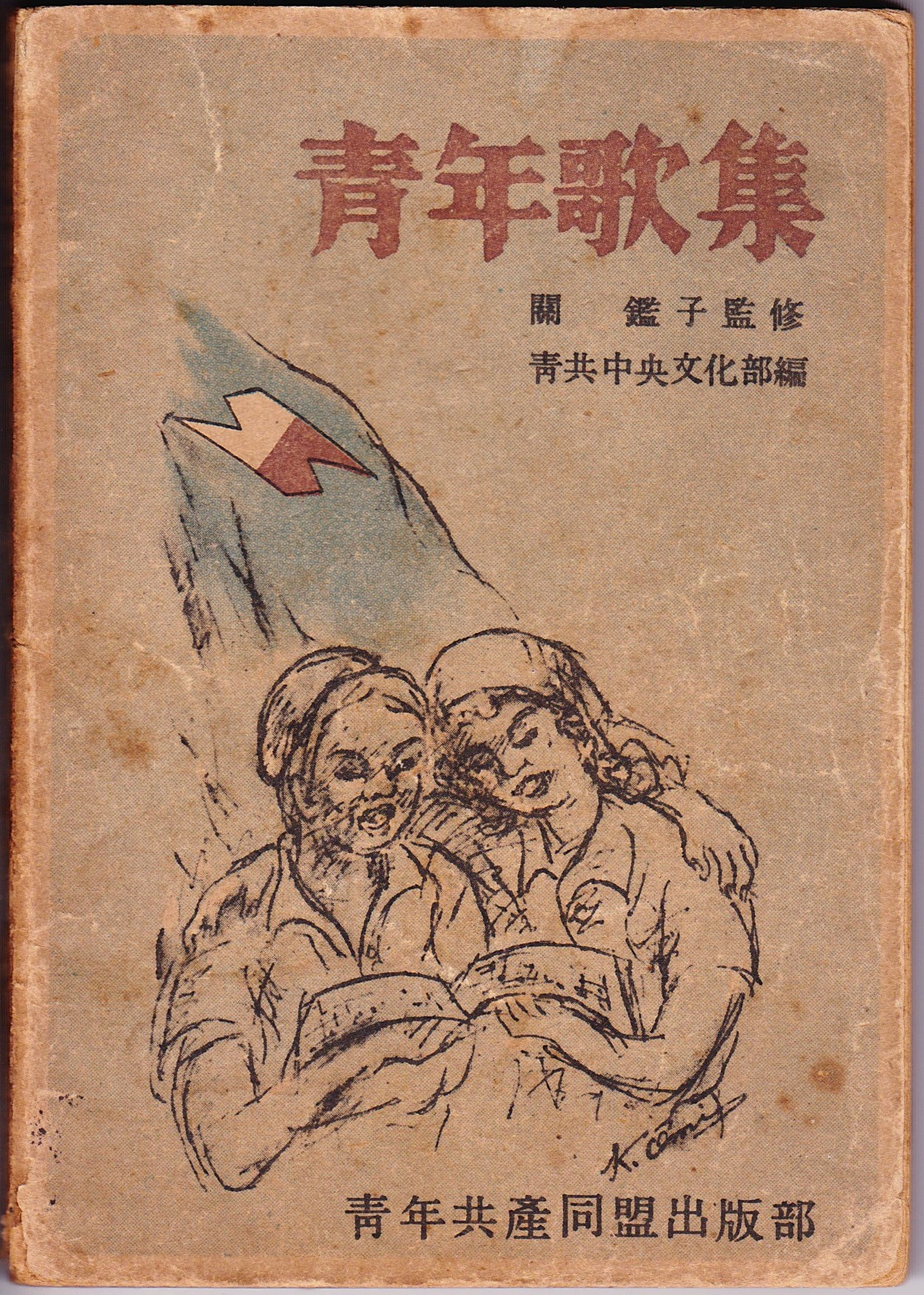
Cover of the first collection of Songs for Youth edited by Akiko Seki (Tokyo, Typography of the cultural section of the Communist Youth League of Japan, 1948)

Akiko Seki (Japanese: 関鑑子) (September 8, 1899 in Tokyo – May 2, 1973 in Tokyo) was a Japanese soprano. She is commonly recognized as the founder of the movement of The Singing Voice of Japan (Japanese: 日本のうたごえ, Nihon no Utagoe / うたごえ運動, Utagoe-undō). In 1955 she was awarded the Stalin Peace Prize.

== Life ==
- March 1921: She graduated in artistic singing at the Music School of Tokyo (Japanese: 東京音楽学校,Tōkyō Ongaku Gakkō).
- May 1, 1946: On the occasion of the first May Day post-war in Tokyo, she conducted L'internationale and a Japanese version of The Red Flag; this experience led her to the creation of a national musical movement of the working class.
- February 10, 1948: She created the Choir of the Communist Youth League of Japan (Japanese: 日本青年共産同盟 中央合唱団, Nihon-seinen-kyōsan-dōmei Chuō-gassyōdan) in Tokyo, as the core of national musical movement of the working class.
- December 20, 1955: She was awarded the Stalin Peace Prize.

== Writings ==
- Collection of Songs for Youth (Japanese: 「青年歌集」, Seinen-kasyū) (Tokyo, Typography of the cultural section of the Communist Youth League of Japan, 1948).
- Bewiched by the singing voice (Japanese: 「歌ごえに魅せられて」, Utagoe ni miserarete) (Tokyo, 1971).

== See also ==
- Japanese Communist Party
- Democratic Youth League of Japan (successor of the Communist Youth League of Japan)
- The Singing Voice of Japan
