= Gordon Schaffer =

British journalist and trade unionist

H. Gordon Schaffer (1 October 1905 – January 1997) was a British journalist.

Schaffer grew up in Clapham and became a journalist with the Clapham Observer and then with the Press Association. From 1937 until 1953, he worked as political correspondent and assistant editor of Reynold's News. From 1941 until 1948, he was also editor of The Journalist, the journal of the National Union of Journalists.

Schaffer first travelled to the Soviet Union in 1936 and was an early member of the British-Soviet Friendship Society, serving as its peace officer from 1976 until 1991. He was also a member of the British Peace Committee, served on the national executive committee of the Co-operative Party, and was a member of the World Peace Council. He wrote an influential and early account of his ten-week visit to the Soviet occupation zone in Germany, entitled Russian Zone. He was highly positive about the occupation, seeing it as bringing about a transition to socialism.

In 1964, Schaffer was awarded the Lenin Peace Prize. He published his autobiography, Baby in The Bathwater, in 1996. He died early the following year.

Media offices
Preceded by O. Rattenbury	Editor of The Journalist; 1942–1948	Succeeded by Allen Hutt
