= Barretos =

Municipality in the state of São Paulo in Brazil

- Municipality
- The Municipality of Barretos
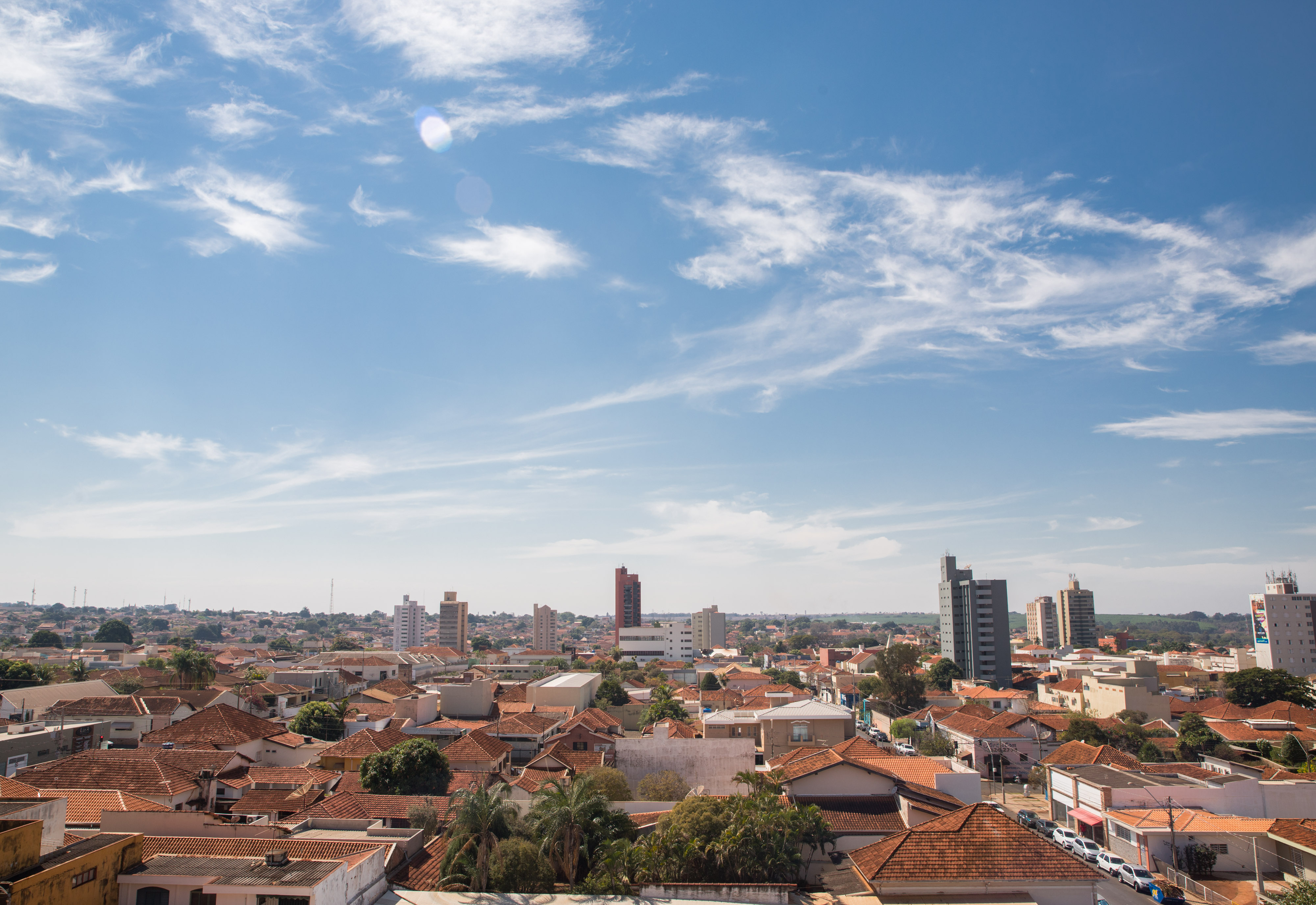

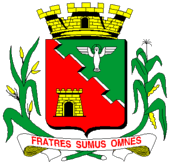
- Flag Coat of arms
- Nicknames: "National Capital of Rodeo" "The Brazilian Nashville"
- Motto: Frates Sumus Omnes (We are all brothers)
- Location of Barretos

- Location in Brazil
- Coordinates: 20°33′25″S 48°34′04″W
- Country: Brazil
- Region: Southeast
- State: São Paulo
- Mesoregion: Ribeirão Preto
- Founded: 1854

Government
  - Mayor: Odair Silva

Area
  - Total: 1,566.161 km^{2} (604.698 sq mi)
- Elevation: 530 m (1,740 ft)

Population (2022)
  - Total: 122,485
  - Estimate (2025): 126,957
  - Density: 78.2072/km^{2} (202.556/sq mi)
- Demonym: Barretense
- Time zone: UTC-3 (UTC-3)
  - Summer (DST): UTC-2 (UTC-2)
- Postal Code: 14780-000
- Area code: (+55) 17
- Website: http://www.barretos.sp.gov.br/ (in Portuguese)

Barretos is a municipality in the northern part of the state of São Paulo, Brazil. The city has approximately 122,485 inhabitants (2022 Census) and an area of 1566.1 km^{2}. Barretos belongs to the Mesoregion of Ribeirão Preto.

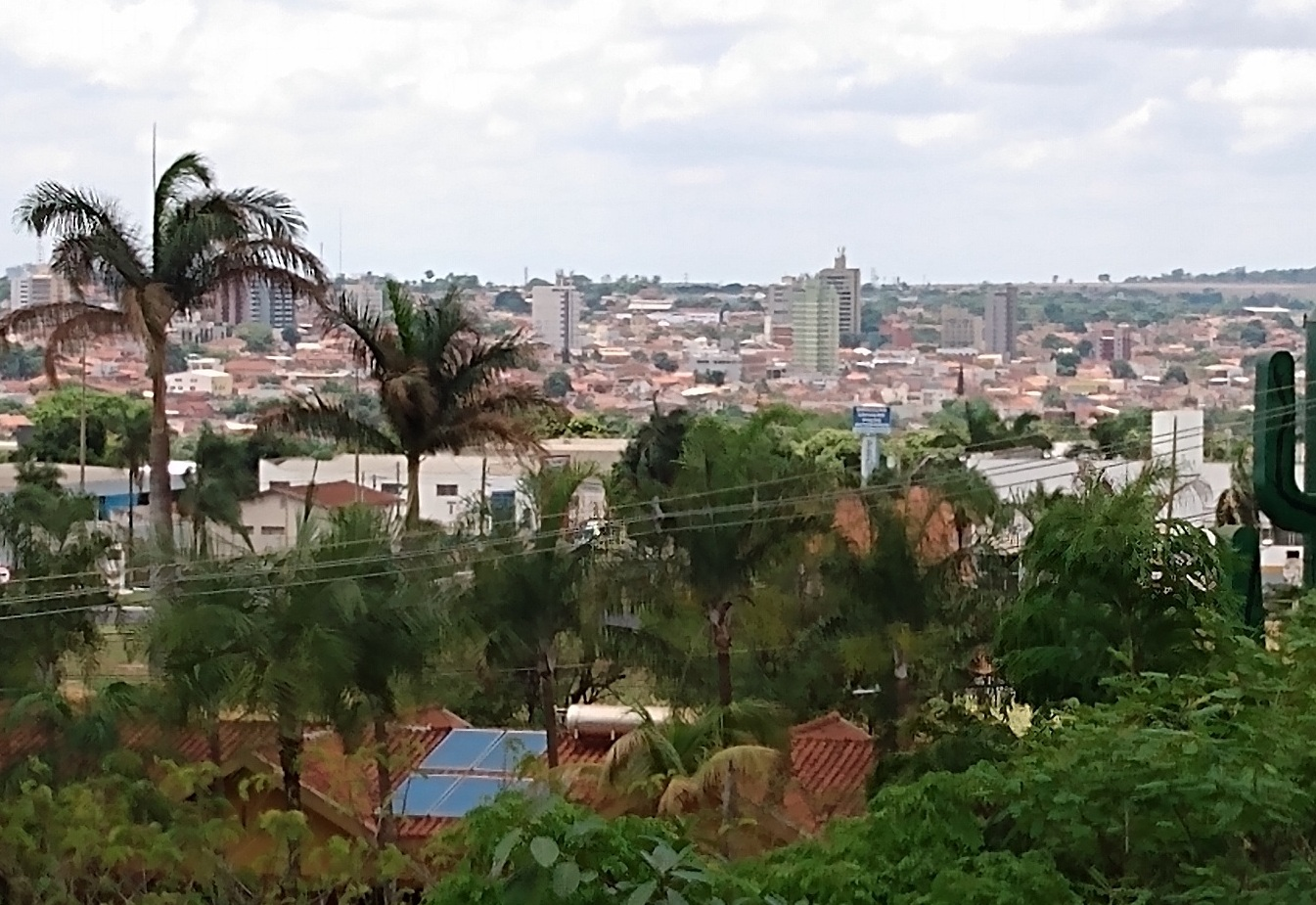
Barretos skyline.

== History ==
The city was founded on August 25, 1854. The first chapel was built in 1856, where today lies the "Praça Francisco Barreto". On January 8, 1897, Barretos was officially established as a municipality.

== Demographics ==
Historical population (municipality)
| Year | Population | %± |
|---|---|---|
| 1920 | 39,782 |
| 1940 | 39,870 | 0.2% |
| 1950 | 50,249 | 26.0% |
| 1960 | 59,204 | 17.8% |
| 1970 | 65,574 | 10.8% |
| 1980 | 72,768 | 11.0% |
| 1991 | 95,414 | 31.1% |
| 2000 | 103,913 | 8.9% |
| 2010 | 112,101 | 7.9% |
| 2022 | 122,485 | 9.3% |

== Economy ==
The tertiary sector of the city is the most relevant, with 72.09% of the city GDP. Industry is 21.64% of the GDP, and the primary sector corresponds to 6.28%. The largest Latin American cancer center is based in this city.

== Culture ==
Barretos hosts annually the most famous rodeo festival in the country, the Festa do Peão de Barretos.

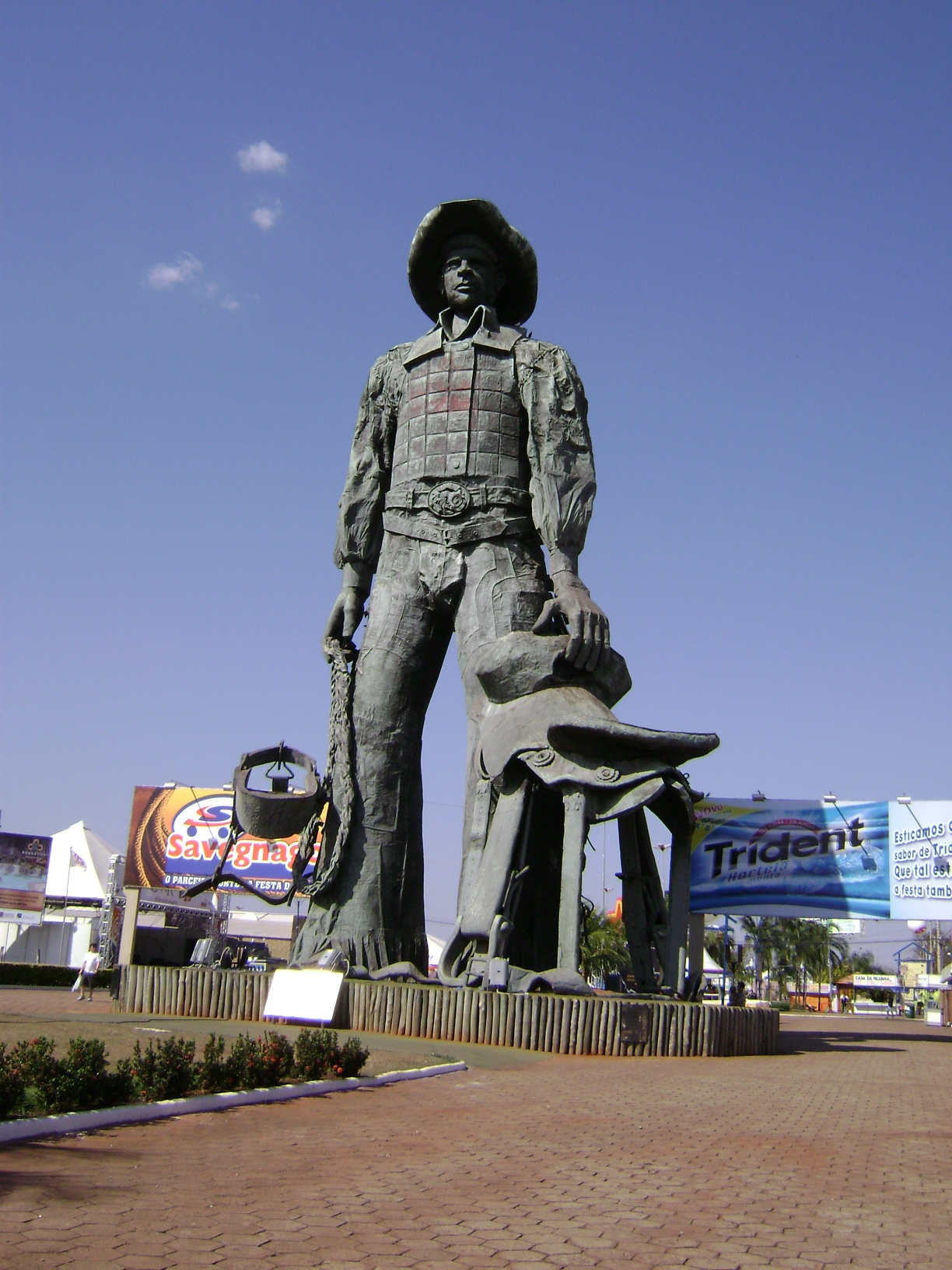
Cowboy monument.

== Media ==
In telecommunications, the city was served by Companhia Telefônica Brasileira until 1973, when it began to be served by Telecomunicações de São Paulo. In July 1998, this company was acquired by Telefónica, which adopted the Vivo brand in 2012.

The company is currently an operator of cell phones, fixed lines, internet (fiber optics/4G) and television (satellite and cable).

== Transportation ==
- SP-326 Rodovia Brigadeiro Faria Lima
- SP-425 Rodovia Assis Chateaubriand

Barretos is served by Chafei Amsei Airport, which offers general aviation but no scheduled flights.

== Sports ==
- Barretos EC - a football club that is in the Campeonato Paulista Segunda Divisão.

== Climate ==
Climate data for Barretos, elevation 540 m (1,770 ft), (1993–2020 normals, extremes 2010–present)
| Month | Jan | Feb | Mar | Apr | May | Jun | Jul | Aug | Sep | Oct | Nov | Dec | Year |
|---|---|---|---|---|---|---|---|---|---|---|---|---|---|
| Record high °C (°F) | 38.8 (101.8) | 38.9 (102.0) | 36.8 (98.2) | 35.1 (95.2) | 33.7 (92.7) | 33.1 (91.6) | 33.8 (92.8) | 37.2 (99.0) | 41.0 (105.8) | 42.9 (109.2) | 37.3 (99.1) | 37.5 (99.5) | 42.9 (109.2) |
| Mean daily maximum °C (°F) | 32.0 (89.6) | 32.6 (90.7) | 32.3 (90.1) | 31.3 (88.3) | 28.9 (84.0) | 29.0 (84.2) | 29.6 (85.3) | 31.4 (88.5) | 32.9 (91.2) | 33.6 (92.5) | 32.2 (90.0) | 32.0 (89.6) | 31.5 (88.7) |
| Daily mean °C (°F) | 26.5 (79.7) | 26.6 (79.9) | 26.2 (79.2) | 24.6 (76.3) | 21.4 (70.5) | 20.7 (69.3) | 20.6 (69.1) | 22.5 (72.5) | 24.7 (76.5) | 26.5 (79.7) | 26.0 (78.8) | 26.3 (79.3) | 24.4 (75.9) |
| Mean daily minimum °C (°F) | 20.9 (69.6) | 20.5 (68.9) | 20.0 (68.0) | 17.8 (64.0) | 13.9 (57.0) | 12.4 (54.3) | 11.7 (53.1) | 13.6 (56.5) | 16.5 (61.7) | 19.3 (66.7) | 19.8 (67.6) | 20.5 (68.9) | 17.2 (63.0) |
| Record low °C (°F) | 14.4 (57.9) | 15.9 (60.6) | 14.0 (57.2) | 8.1 (46.6) | 4.6 (40.3) | 2.2 (36.0) | 2.1 (35.8) | 3.7 (38.7) | 7.0 (44.6) | 9.6 (49.3) | 11.8 (53.2) | 15.1 (59.2) | 2.1 (35.8) |
| Average precipitation mm (inches) | 295.4 (11.63) | 204.7 (8.06) | 165.9 (6.53) | 62.1 (2.44) | 60.6 (2.39) | 20.2 (0.80) | 9.2 (0.36) | 13.2 (0.52) | 47.6 (1.87) | 92.5 (3.64) | 170.6 (6.72) | 219.0 (8.62) | 1,361 (53.58) |
| Average precipitation days (≥ 1.0 mm) | 14.3 | 10.9 | 10.4 | 5.2 | 4.0 | 2.1 | 1.3 | 2.3 | 3.9 | 7.2 | 10.3 | 13.4 | 85.3 |
Source 1: Centro Integrado de Informações Agrometeorológicas
Source 2: INMET

== Notable people ==
- Douglas Camilo da Silva (born 1990), footballer
- Wagner Coradin (born 1989), footballer
- Elisa Branco (1912-2001), peace activist

== Religion ==
Christianity is present in the city as follows:

=== Catholic Church ===
The Catholic church in the municipality is part of the Roman Catholic Diocese of Barretos.

=== Protestant Church ===
The most diverse evangelical beliefs are present in the city, mainly Pentecostal, including the Assemblies of God in Brazil (the largest evangelical church in the country), Christian Congregation in Brazil, among others. These denominations are growing more and more throughout Brazil.

== See also ==
- List of municipalities in São Paulo
