= Allen Hutt =

British communist journalist and trade union activist (1901–1973)

George Allen Hutt (20 September 1901 – 10 August 1973) was a British journalist, editor, newspaper designer and Communist and trade union activist.

== Life ==
Hutt came from a family of printers, while his mother Marion was a headmistress. He attended Kilburn Grammar School and then Downing College, Cambridge, graduating with a first-class honours degree in history in 1923.

As a young man Hutt became a convinced communist and member of the Communist Party of Great Britain. After beginning a career as a writer and journalist, he became an expert on newspaper production, frequently advising newspapers on their design. His clients included The Guardian and Reynold's News. He was also newspaper consultant to the typesetting machine company Monotype. He wrote many reviews and books, including The Post-war History Of The British Working Class (1937) and British Trade Unionism (1941).

Hutt was active in the National Union of Journalists for many years. He was longtime editor of the union's journal, The Journalist, and was the union's president in the year 1967.

His book Newspaper Design (1960, revised 1967) was very successful. Conservative journalist Arthur Christiansen, whose work was praised in the text, described it as "a prodigious service to journalism" and "destined to be a standard work for years". After his death an updated edition was written by Bob James.

At the time of Hutt's retirement in 1966 he was chief sub-editor of the Daily Worker, but he continued working as a freelance consultant. He was named a Royal Designer for Industry in 1970.

== Family ==
Hutt's son Sam Hutt (born 1940) is a gynaecologist, but is better known as a country and western singer-songwriter and television presenter under the stage name Hank Wangford.

Allen Hutt later married Avis Hutt (née Askey, formerly Clarke), a nurse and health visitor who was the widow of communist surgeon Ruscoe Clarke.

Collections of Hutt's personal papers are held by Cambridge University Library, Miyazaki University and the People's History Museum. As a communist activist, the Metropolitan Police held a file of cuttings on Hutt's work, which has been released under Freedom of Information legislation.

Media offices
Preceded by Gordon Schaffer	Editor of The Journalist; 1948–1972	Succeeded by A. E. Simpson
