= Hank Wangford =

Musical artist (born 1940)

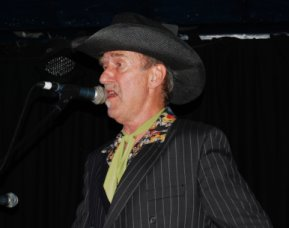

Background information
- Born: Samuel Hutt; 15 November 1940 (age 85); Brocket Hall, Welwyn Garden City, Hertfordshire, England
- Genre: Country and western
- Occupations: Physician; musician
- Instrument: Guitar
- Years active: 1976–present
- Labels: Cow Pie; Sincere Sounds; Charisma; Situation Two
- Website: hankwangford.co.uk
- Education: St John's College, Cambridge
- Father: Allen Hutt

Samuel Hutt (born 15 November 1940), known by the stage name Hank Wangford, is an English country and western songwriter.

Hutt adopted the persona of Hank Wangford when he decided to become a country singer in the late 1970s. "Hank is a good smoke screen. He can do things I can't do. He's my clown," Hutt told Howell Raines in 1988. "I actually had more of an identity crisis with [being Sam Hutt] than with Hank, because Hank is a fool. I quite like him. Dr. Sam was definitely threatening to become a monster." He called himself Wangford after the village of that name in Suffolk, which is where he first conceived the idea of using a nom de plume.

== Background ==
In his appearance in the film A Brief History of Brocket Hall, Sam Hutt claimed that he was born in an upstairs room at Brocket Hall, Hertfordshire, on the night of 14–15 November 1940, during The Blitz. (Note: Colin Larkin, in his Virgin Encyclopedia of Popular Music, claims that Hutt was actually born in Wangford. Given what Hutt himself says, this is almost certainly false.) It was a forceps delivery. As he says in the film, Brocket Hall has a history of sexual scandals, involving the royal family and politicians but, by 1940, it had become a maternity home. The British Government had intelligence that the Germans were planning to flatten London on the night of the birth, when there was to be a full moon (The "Hunter Moon" or "Blood Moon"), which would provide good visibility. His mother was therefore evacuated to Hertfordshire for the birth. In the event, on the night of the birth the Germans bombed Coventry, not London.

Sam Hutt's father was the journalist and communist activist Allen Hutt, who – alongside his work as chief sub-editor of the Daily Worker and member of the National Union of Journalists executive committee – was also renowned for his expertise in typesetting and newspaper design. His mother, meanwhile, taught English to "admirals and students in the Russian Embassy". Hutt grew up in north London, and was educated at William Ellis School in Gospel Oak and St John's College, Cambridge, where he studied the natural sciences tripos and took part in revue performances as a member of the Cambridge Footlights. After completing his undergraduate degree, he remained in Cambridge to complete his medical training, eventually becoming a doctor.

Upon leaving Cambridge, Hutt set up practice at a drug addiction centre in London, which "brought him into contact with a lot of rockers and wide renown as London's long-haired, rock-and-roll doctor." Among those who sought his services were the likes of Ian Dury and Pink Floyd. "If any of them had sore throats, they’d call me in," he later said. "It was easy for them to see someone like me, because I had long hair like them and was unshockable." His prescriptions included tincture of cannabis, which he gave "to anyone who wanted it", and which he saw as a "revolutionary act" that would subvert both the authorities and predatory drug dealers. Nonetheless, he had his limits. "I never prescribed any harder drugs. If they wanted those, I sent them to Harley Street where they could get whatever they wanted, from the 'straight' doctors, in the pinstripe suits." Such was Hutt's fame as 'Dr Rock' that he was one of those "scenemakers" who were flown to New York to attend the show given in 1970 by the country band Brinsley Schwarz at Fillmore East, which has since gone down in infamy as the Brinsley Schwarz Hype.

== Musical career ==
=== Early years ===
Wangford was interested in music as a child, and it was through his father's prominence in Communist Party circles that he first met the folk singer Ewan MacColl, who lectured him on the need to remain true to his roots and not appropriate the music of other cultures. His first writing credit (as Sam Hutt) was on a 1965 single by Sarah Miles, "Where Am I", which he later described as having "atrocious" lyrics. His first recording (credited as Boeing Duveen & The Beautiful Soup) was "Jabberwock"/"Which Dreamed It" (issued on UK Parlophone R 5696) in May 1968; he is co-credited as "Sam Hutt" on both sides together with Lewis Carroll, with whose words the songs are adapted.

=== Inventing Hank Wangford ===
A meeting with former Byrds member Gram Parsons, whose wife was in meed of medical attention, first led Wangford to country music. During this visit Parsons played the song "You're Still on My Mind" (from the album Sweetheart of the Rodeo). "So I see here, and outside the curtain, Gram picks up my guitar and sings, 'An empty bottle. A broken heart, and you're still on my mind,' – a song I still play to this day. That was when the penny dropped. Which it didn’t when I heard him play The Byrds. But just singing it there with his cracked voice... that was soul." Parsons also introduced Wangford to the work of George Jones, who remains his biggest musical influence.

However, Wangford only considered the idea of reinventing himself as a country music singer after breaking up with his girlfriend in 1976. He described his epiphany to Howell Raines thus:

I moved to Suffolk near a village called Wangford. I was sitting in a pub, really miserable, crying in my beer, totally unjustified. My girl friend was right to leave me. She left me and married my best friend. We're talking classic country. So Hank sort of came to me. Oh, perfect – a self-pitying country singer named Hank Wangford. It was also kind of British – taking the ironic side of country music and extending it. Anyway, Hank takes the mantle of pain and Hank starts crying in his beer and Sam Hutt feels much better.

Shortly afterwards, he made a "tongue-in-cheek" appearance in the Wangford persona at the May horse fair in Bungay. "It was a terrific success, a very wacky gig. A band formed then and there, and we started doing the country music circuit." Two women who had performed in a can-can group at the fair became his backing singers, calling themselves the Hank-Kerchiefs. Together, that band became known as the Hank Wangford Band.

=== The Hank Wangford Band ===
The Hank Wangford Band were soon gigging around the country, and recorded their first live album with Cow Pie Records in 1982. The 1984 Edinburgh Festival Fringe saw the band achieve some acclaim, with their show being nominated for the Perrier Award. Fringe Sunday also saw the importation to Edinburgh of the sport of cow-pat flinging. Unfortunately, this required hard cow-pats as an essential part of the process. BBC Radio 1 DJ Andy Kershaw had to put out an appeal for cow-pats, which later had to be dried in a microwave oven for them to work successfully.

During the miners' strike that same year, the Hank Wangford Band toured extensively with Billy Bragg and the Frank Chickens as "Hank, Frank and Billy", performing at trade-union benefit and anti-racist gigs. It was during such a benefit for the Greater London Council (GLC) in 1984 that Hank and the band were attacked on stage by a group of right-wing skinheads, an event that has been immortalised in the song "On The Line".

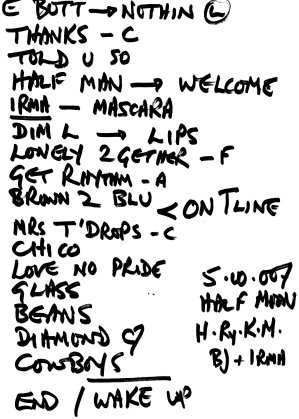
Hank's setlist

=== No Hall Too Small Tour ===
Wangford has also toured with Reg Meuross and with Andy Roberts on the "No Hall Too Small" tour of village halls throughout the UK as part of the Arts Council-funded National Rural Touring Forum (NRTF).

== Writing and television career ==
Wangford has written an occasional series of travel articles for The Guardian newspaper and is president of the "Nude Mountaineering Society". He has also appeared on television, presenting the documentaries A-to-Z of C&W and Big, Big Country. His performance in front of a crowd of inmates at Strangeways Prison – in imitation of Johnny Cash at San Quentin – was broadcast by Channel 4 in 1984.

== Discography ==
- Hank Wangford - Hank Wangford, Cow Pie Records (COW 1), 1980
- Hank Wangford - "Wild Thing" c/w "All I Want", Cow Pie Records (PIE001), 1980 (7")
- Hank Wangford - "Cowboys Stay On Longer" c/w "Whisky On My Guitar", Cow Pie Records (PIE002), 1980 (7")
- Hank Wangford - "Cowboys Stay On Longer" c/w "Whisky On My Guitar", WEA (K18712), 1980 (7")
- The Hank Wangford Band Live, Cow Pie Records (COW 2), 1982
- The Hank Wangford Band, Rodeo Radio, Situation Two (SITU 16), 1985
- The Hank Wangford Band, Cowboys Stay On Longer, Sincere Sounds (Honky 1X), 1987 (12")
- The Hank Wangford Band, Cowboys Stay On Longer, Sincere Sounds (Honky 1A-DJ), 1987 (7")

CDs

- Hank Wangford - Cowboys Stay On Longer, Reissue Albums One and Two, Sincere Sounds, 2001
- Hank Wangford - Stormy Horizons, Sincere Sounds, 1990
- Hank Wangford & The Lost Cowboys - Hard Shoulder To Cry On, Live Album Sincere Sounds, 1993
- Hank Wangford & The Lost Cowboys - Wake Up Dead, Sincere Sounds, 1997
- Hank Wangford & The Lost Cowboys - Best Foot Forward, Sincere Sounds, 2003
- Hank Wangford & The Lost Cowboys - Whistling In The Dark, Sincere Sounds, 2008
- Hank Wangford & The Lost Cowboys - Save Me The Waltz, (Double Album) Sincere Sounds, 2014
- Hank Wangford - Holey Holey, Sincere Sounds, 2020

Cassettes

- The Hank Wangford Band Bumper Box, Cow Pie Records (CCP1), 1981
- The Hank Wangford Band - Rootin' Tootin' Santa Claus, Cow Pie Records (CCP2), 1982

== Bibliography ==
- Hank Wangford Volume III The Middle Years as told to Sam Hutt, Pan London 1989, ISBN 0-330-30925-0
- Lost Cowboys From Patagonia to the Alamo by Hank Wangford. Orion Cassell 1997
