= The Singing Voice of Japan =

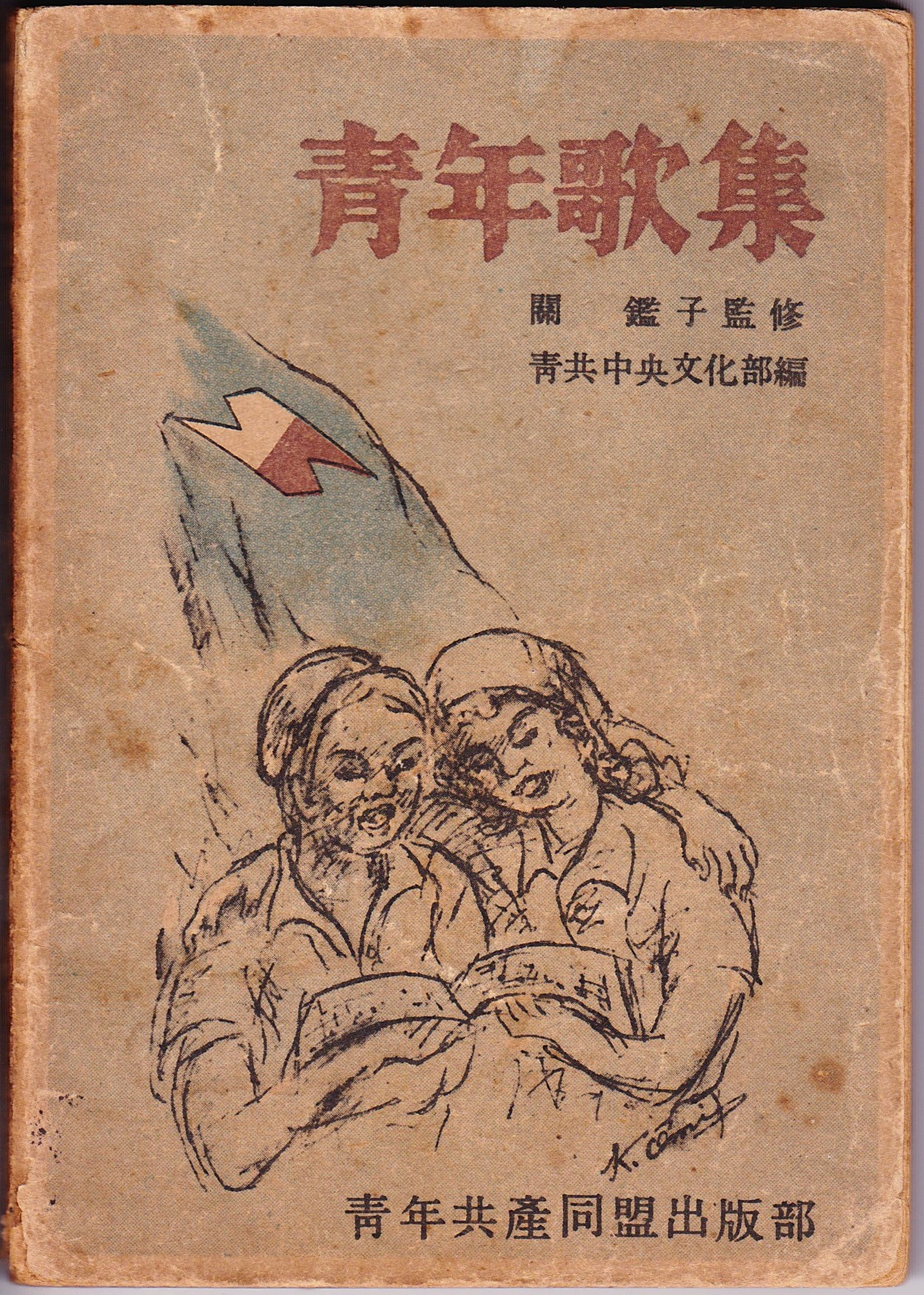
Cover of the first collection of Songs for Youth edited by Akiko Seki (Tokyo, Typography of the cultural section of the Communist Youth League of Japan, 1948)

The Singing Voice of Japan (Japanese: 日本のうたごえ, Nihon no Utagoe / うたごえ運動, Utagoe-undō) is the name of a social and political movement that emerged after World War II in Japan and based on musical and choral activities of the working class of the entire nation. Ideologically communist or democratic socialist, activists of the movement organize choral circles in factories, in schools and in their residential areas. The movement reached its peak in the years 1950 and 1960. Japanese singer Akiko Seki (Japanese: 関鑑子) is generally regarded as the founder of the Singing Voice of Japan.

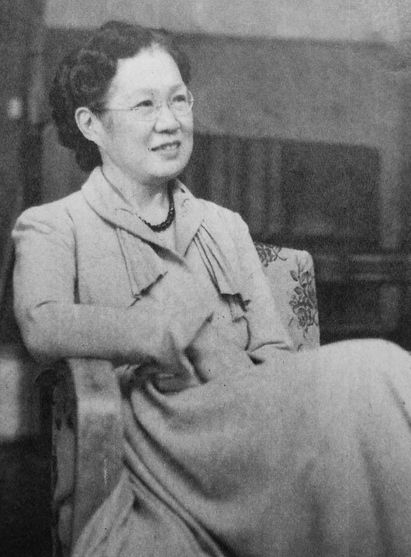
A portrait of Akiko Seki in 1955

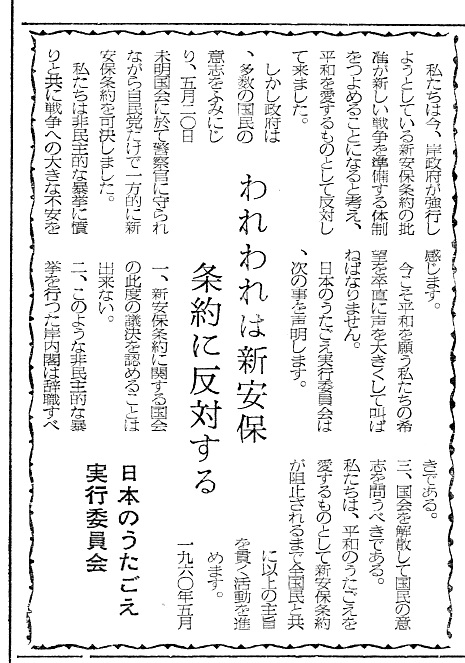
Statement of the Executive Committee, opposing the renewal of Treaty of Mutual Cooperation and Security between the United States and Japan (Journal of The Singing Voice of Japan, June 11, 1960)

== History ==
- May 1, 1946: In the occasion of the first May Day post-war in Tokyo, Akiko Seki conducted L'internationale and a Japanese version of The Red Flag; this experience led her to the creation of a national musical movement of the working class.
- February 10, 1948: Akiko Seki created the Choir of the Communist Youth League of Japan (Japanese: 日本青年共産同盟中央合唱団, romanized: Nihon-seinen-kyōsan-dōmei Chuō-gassyōdan) in Tokyo, as the core of national musical movement of the working class.
- June 1949: First issue of the periodical Singing Voice, organ of the Choir of the Communist Youth League of Japan (Japanese: 日本青年共産同盟中央合唱団機関紙「うたごえ」, romanized: Utagoe).
- November 29, 1953: First national festival of the Singing voice of Japan in Tokyo, in the halls Hibiya Kōkaidō (日比谷公会堂) and Kanda Kyōristu Kōdō (神田共立講堂).
- February 14, 1955: Permanent institution of the Executive Committee of the Festival of the Singing Voice of Japan (Japanese: 日本のうたごえ実行委員会, romanized: Nihon no Utagoe Jikkō-Iinkai).
- December 20, 1955: Akiko Seki received the Stalin Peace Prize.
- May 1960: Statement of the Executive Committee of the Festival opposing the renewal of Treaty of Mutual Cooperation and Security between the United States and Japan.
- November 7, 1967: Première of a partial version of the opera Okinawa (Japanese: 歌劇「沖縄」, romanized: Kageki Okinawa) in Naha (Okinawa).
- November 25, 1967: First local performance in Tokyo, of the partial version of the opera Okinawa , in the Nippon Budōkan (日本武道館).
- December 10, 1969: First performance of the complete version of the opera Okinawa in Tokyo, in the hall Shibuya Kōkaidō (渋谷公会堂).
- April 1971: First issue of the quarterly organ of the executive committee of the Festival (Japanese: 「季刊日本のうたごえ」, romanized: Kikan Nihon no Utagoe).
- February 25, 1974: Radical revision of the organizational system of the executive committee, adopted during its sixth national congress: renaming the committee "National Council of the Singing Voice of Japan" (Japanese: 日本のうたごえ全国協議会, romanized: Nihon no utagoe zenkoku kyōgikai).

== Musical repertoire and organization ==
The repertoire of the movement consists mainly in revolutionary songs and those of the working class of different nations. Among registered members of individual committees (distinguished by region, industrial union, and other criterion) of the singing voice of Japan is favored to create new songs and choral pieces in the genre suited to the needs of their group. According to the program adopted in 2013, the National Council of the singing voice of Japan aims the objective to include 500 units and choral circles allover the national territory of Japan.

== Origin of the Hiragana script (うたごえ) for the name of the movement ==
Traditionally, the two initial words of the movement's official name Singing Voice are not expressed in Kanji (Japanese: 漢字) as would be standard today, but in Hiragana (Japanese: 平仮名) that is: うたごえ (Utagoe written in Hiragana) instead of 歌声 (the same in Kanji). And at least since the first national Festival of the movement in 1953, its title text was written in Hiragana: The singing voice is the vitality of peace - The Singing Voice of Japan 1953 (Japanese: うたごえは平和の力 - 1953年日本のうたごえ). Concerning the origin of such a particular script, Masamitsu Kiyomiya (清宮正光) who was one of the founding members of the Choir of the Communist Youth League of Japan, recalled the moment of publication of the first choir organ Utagoe (June 1949) in these terms:

...When we decided to create the periodical organ of the Choir, I was in charge of all the task. It was my idea to name it with the words Singing Voice in Hiragana script (Japanese: うたごえ, romanized: Utagoe), because at that time these words were not well diffused, so this might have been one of the most important works of my career. Thus I entitled it in Hiragana because the aim of the movement was to involve even a large part of the working class that could not have graduated the secondary school.

However, even after the first issue of the choir organ, the script for the Japanese word Utagoe in Kanji (歌声) and one mixed with Hiragana (歌ごえ) were sometimes used by authors of books or periodicals concerning The Singing Voice of Japan, while an exclusive formalization of Hiragana script (うたごえ) has never been imposed by any official organization of the movement. A very remarkable example of the graphical oscillation would be the autograph of Akiko Seki dedicated to the national Festival of December 1962, in which she wrote one of the movement slogans The singing voice is the vitality of peace (Japanese: うたごえは平和の力, romanized: Utagoe wa heiwa no chikara) using mixed script of both Kanji and Hiragana for the word Utagoe, precisely such as: 歌こえ [sic].

== Relationship with the Japanese Communist Party ==
In accordance with the slogan Let's sing for the struggle (of the working class) (Japanese: うたは闘いとともに, romanized: Uta wa tatakai to tomo ni), activists of the movement have composed many songs to encourage workers protest against illegal discrimination of their employers. In the 1960s, instruction of militants of the movement and continued improvement of their ideological, political and artistic quality were considered important means of cultural policy by the Japanese Communist Party (Japanese: 日本共産党, romanized: Nihon kyōsantō). Nowadays (2016), the only group that is active and explicitly dedicated to the support of JCP is Choir of JCP-fans (Japanese: JCPファン雑唱団, romanized: JCP fan zassyōdan), established in 2011 in Kyoto by veteran activists of the movement and directed by Tadao Yamamoto, composer, accordionist, choir director and an ordinary member of the National Council of The Singing Voice of Japan: the choir witnesses the historical connection calling itself by the acronym of English official name of the party. Its repertory and artistic activity are strongly linked in the movement, and in various cultural events organized by the Party, the Choir of JCP-fans appears as an element among the joined choirs of the volunteer singers of The Singing Voice of Japan.

Notable concerts and performances of the Choir:

- February 11, 2011, Kyoto Kaikan Hall: Concert sponsored by the Kyoto Committee of the JCP.
- August 1, 2013, Nishijin Bunka Center (Kyoto): Cultural Live Revolutionary Pub, in collaboration with Tokiko Nishiyama, former JCP member of the House of Councilors.
- September 23, 2014, Takaragaike Park (Kyoto): Festival Kyoto ed.2014, organized by the Kyoto Committee of the JCP.
- February 1, 2015, Kyoiku Bunka Center (Kyoto): Festival sponsored by the Kyoto Committee of the JCP.
- April 29, 2016, Takaragaike Park (Kyoto): Festival Kyoto ed.2016, organized by the Kyoto Committee of the JCP: performance with Seifuku Kōjō Iinkai (制服向上委員会) and Akira Koike (小池晃), JCP member of the House of Councilors, and Secretary-General of the Party.

== Episode of a Minister of Finance who tried to show his cultural competence uttering the name of the movement ==
In 1963, during a discussion in the Budget Committee of the House of Councillors of Japan (Japanese: 参議院予算委員会) around taxes to impose on entry tickets to theaters, Gorō Sudō (Japanese: 須藤五郎), a member of the Japanese Communist Party and militant of The Singing Voice of Japan, asked Kakuei Tanaka (Japanese: 田中角栄), Minister of Finance at the time, if he knew of the existence of an workers' association of concert goers. To such a question, Minister Tanaka had to answer: "I do not know well about it". So Sudō recommenced his speech but the Minister who listened for a moment the continuation of the speech interrupted Sudō, uttering: "The Singing Voice..." (Japanese: うたごえ．．．, romanized: Utagoe...), then Sudō replied: "Not The Singing Voice of Japan. I am speaking of an association of music listeners. The Singing Voice of Japan is a movement for singers"^{,}.

== Personalities and historical activists ==
- Akiko Seki (関鑑子): singer, founder of the movement (1899–1973)
- Sakae Araki (荒木栄): composer (1924–1962)
- Gorō Sudō (須藤五郎): composer, conductor, JCP member of the House of Councilors (1897–1988)
- Yoritoyo Inoue (井上頼豊): cellist (1912–1996)
- Katsura Nakazawa (中澤桂): soprano (1933–2016)
- Nobuo Terahara (寺原伸夫): composer (1928–1998)
- Hikaru Hayashi (林光): composer (1931–2012)
- Yūzō Toyama (外山雄三): conductor (1931–)
- Susumu Ōnishi (大西進): composer (1931–)
- Nobuo Sugimoto (杉本信夫): composer, musicologist (1934–)
- Kiminobu Sōma (相馬公信): composer, choir singer (1942–)
- Tadao Yamamoto (山本忠生): composer (1939–)
- Hiromi Fujimoto (藤本洋): poet (1932–)
- Daisuke Doi (土井大助): poet (1927–2014)
- Taku Izumi (いずみたく): composer (1930–1992)
- Kōji Kinoshita (木下航二): composer (1925–1999)

== Bibliography ==
=== General history of the movement ===
- Various authors: The Singing Voice of Japan - collection of favorite songs: definitive edition (special issue of the magazine Chisei, Tokyo, 1956). Library catalog of the Miyagi Gakuin Women's University^{[JA]}. 「日本のうたごえ: 決定版 愛唱歌集」（雑誌「知性」1956年増刊号：東京、河出書房）
- Toshio Itoya: History of labors' and revolutionary songs (Tokyo, 1970). NDL Search^{[JA]}. 糸屋寿雄「労働歌・革命歌物語」（東京、1970年）
- Akiko Seki: Since I am bewitched by the singing voice (Tokyo, 1971). NDL Search^{[JA]}. 関鑑子「歌ごえに魅せられて」（東京、1971年）
- Nishio Jirouhei and Tamotsu Yazawa: Japanese revolutionary songs (Tokyo, 1974). NDL Search^{[JA]}. 西尾治郎平、矢沢保 編「日本の革命歌」（東京、1974年）
- Yoritoyo Inoue: Singing voice, spread your wings (Tokyo, 1978). NDL Search^{[JA]}. 井上頼豊 編「うたごえよ翼ひろげて: 1948-1978」（東京、1978年）
- Tamotsu Yazawa: Singing voice for freedom and revolution (Tokyo, 1978). NDL Search^{[JA]}. 矢沢保「自由と革命の歌ごえ」（東京、1978年）
- Various authors: Introduction to The Singing Voice of Japan - commemorating the 30th anniversary of the movement, in: Kikan Nihon no Utagoe (Quarterly theoretical organ of the National Council of The Singing Voice of Japan, December 1978). NDL Search^{[JA]}. 「30周年記念 うたごえ運動入門」（日本のうたごえ全国協議会理論誌「季刊日本のうたごえ」1978年12月号）
- Hiromi Fujimoto: Singing for the struggle of the working class - History of The Singing Voice of Japan (Tokyo, 1980). Catalogue of the Prefectural Library of Nagasaki^{[JA]}. 藤本洋「うたは闘いとともに: うたごえの歩み」（東京、1980年）

=== History of specific aspects of the movement ===
- Hiromi Fujimoto: Singing for the struggle of the working class - History of the Choir Chūō (Tokyo, 1971). NDL Search^{[JA]}. 藤本洋「歌はたたかいとともに: 中央合唱団のあゆみ」（東京、1971年）
- Various authors: Great red rose: memories around Akiko Seki (Tokyo, 1981). NDL Search^{[JA]}. 関鑑子追想集編集委員会 編「大きな紅ばら: 関鑑子追想集」(東京、1981年)
- Yaeko Morita: Let this victory resonate, roar: life of Sakae Araki (Tokyo, 1983). NDL Search^{[JA]}. 森田ヤエ子「この勝利ひびけとどろけ: 荒木栄の生涯」（東京、1983年）
- Kuniyoshi Kōya: Songs and life of Sakae Araki, composer of the working class (Tokyo, 1985). NDL Search^{[JA]}. 神谷国善「労働者作曲家 荒木栄の歌と生涯」（東京、1985年）
- Saburō Hino: Rails, sing in full voice - the romanticism of railway workers (Tokyo, 1988). NDL Search^{[JA]}. 日野三朗「レールよ高らかにうたえ: 鉄路に生きる男のロマン」（東京、1988年）
- Various authors: Resonate, singing voice for peace - the movement of The Singing Voice of Japan under the US military occupation in Okinawa (Haebaru [Okinawa], 2004). NDL Search^{[JA]}. 沖縄のうたごえ運動編集委員会 企画・編集「ひびけ平和のうたごえ: 米軍占領下の沖縄のうたごえ運動」（沖縄・南風原町、2004年）
- Tsuneko Nara: Memory of my life for The Singing Voice of Japan (Tokyo, 2007). NDL Search^{[JA]}. 奈良恒子「うたごえに生きて」（東京、2007年）

=== Dissertations ===
- (in Japanese) Shigeyuki Kusano (Japanese: 草野滋之) (1983). "The movement The Singing Voice of Japan and Self-formation of the Youth / うたごえ運動と青年の自己形成" (PDF). (Japanese: 首都大学東京, romanized: Syuto-daigaku Tokyo, lit. 'Tokyo Metropolitan University').
- (in Japanese) Shōichi Ōtsubo (Japanese: 大坪正一) (1998). "An empirical research on the propagation of a cultural movement / 文化運動の普及に関する実証的研究". (Japanese: 弘前大学教育学部, romanized: Hirosaki-daigaku kyōyō-gakubu, lit. 'Faculty of Education of the Hirosaki University'). Archived from the original (PDF) on August 18, 2016.
- (in Japanese) Mayumi Terada (Japanese: 寺田真由美) (2003). "The meaning of Japanese popular songs in the movement The Singing Voice of Japan: a study on the case of 'Kiso-bushi' in the 30s of the Showa Era / うたごえ運動における民謡の意義: 昭和30年代の《木曽節》を例として" (PDF). (Japanese: 神戸大学, romanized: Kōbe-daigaku, lit. 'Kobe University').
- (in Japanese) Yūko Monna (Japanese: 門奈由子) (2012). "The movement of The Singing Voice of Japan in the second half of 1950 / 1950年代後半の「うたごえ運動」" (PDF). (Japanese: 日本女子大学, romanized: Nihon-joshi-daigaku, lit. 'Japan Women's University').
- (in Japanese) Hideya Kawanishi (Japanese: 河西秀哉) (2013). "The start point of The Singing Voice of Japan / うたごえ運動の出発" (PDF). (Japanese: 神戸女学院大学, romanized: Kōbe-Jogakuin-daigaku, lit. 'Kobe College').

== See also ==
- Japanese Communist Party
- Democratic Youth League of Japan (successor of the Communist Youth League of Japan)
- Choir of JCP-fans
