= Kurt Bachmann (politician) =

German politician, Holocaust survivor and member of the anti-Nazi resistance

Leader of the German Communist Party
- In office 1969–1973
- Preceded by: position established
- Succeeded by: Herbert Mies

Personal details
- Born: 22 June 1909; Düren, German Empire
- Died: 23 February 1997 (aged 87); Cologne, Germany
- Political party: German Communist Party (1968–); German Peace Union (1950s–1960s); Communist Party of Germany (1932–1956)
- Spouse: Alice Bachmann
- Awards: Lenin Peace Prize (1979); Order of Karl Marx (1974); Order of Friendship of Peoples (1974)

Kurt Bachmann (22 June 1909 – 23 February 1997) was a German politician, Holocaust survivor, and member of the anti-Nazi resistance in Germany. From 1969 to 1973 he was leader of the German Communist Party (DKP).

== Life ==
Bachmann was born on 22 June 1909 in Düren. His father, Max Bachmann, was a retail manager and social democrat, while his mother, Elfriede Bachmann née Klaber, was a leather tanner of Jewish origins.

In 1929 Bachmann became a member of the Revolutionäre Gewerkschafts Opposition (RGO). In 1932, he became a member of the Communist Party of Germany (KPD). Following the seizure of power by the Nazi Party in 1933, Bachmann took part in resistance activities in Cologne, primarily distributing illegal publications. Together with Otto Kropp and Ulrich Osche, he established an underground KPD organization in Cologne, bringing together activists who had evaded crackdowns by the Gestapo. Otto Kropp was arrested in 1936 and executed in 1937, but did not reveal any information about Bachmann to the Nazi authorities.

In 1938, Bachmann and his wife Alice Bachmann (née Wertheim), who was also Jewish, migrated to France for work. When the Second World War broke out in 1939, he was interned by French authorities as a German national. He was a member of an underground KPD cell in Toulouse.

In 1942, Bachmann was arrested and put on a transport to Auschwitz with his wife Alice. Since he was able to work, he was separated from the others; his wife was murdered. Bachmann was an inmate in various concentration camps, at Buchenwald he was able to reconnect with other members of the KPD.

After the Communist Party of Germany (KPD) was banned in West Germany in 1956, Bachmann worked as a reprographer, then as a correspondent for the anti-fascist weekly newspaper Die Tat in Bonn. In the 1965 West German federal election, he was a candidate of the Deutsche Friedensunion (trans. German Peace Union). Bachmann worked to establish the German Communist Party (DKP), and served as party leader from 1969 to 1973.

In 1974, he received the Order of Friendship of Peoples, and the Order of Karl Marx. In 1979, he received the Lenin Peace Prize.

Until 1990, Bachmann was a member of the Central Committee of the DKP, and the governing council of the International Federation of Resistance Fighters – Association of Anti-Fascists.

In the 1980s and 1990s, Bachmann participated in the peace movement, and anti-racist activism in Cologne (see Arsch huh, Zäng ussenander). He also volunteered as a contemporary witness, taking part in projects documenting the history of persecution under the Nazi regime. Bachmann died in Cologne on 23 February 1997.

== Selected works ==
- Bachmann, Kurt (1983). 1933. Texte, Fotos, Chronik. Frankfurt: Verlag Marxistische Blätter. ISBN 978-3880126756.
- Bachmann, Kurt (1999). Wir müssen Vorkämpfer der Menschenrechte sein. Reden und Schriften. Cologne: Verlag Pahl-Rugenstein Nachfolger. ISBN 978-3891442685
