= Lenin Peace Prize =

Soviet state award for international recipients

- Country: Soviet Union
- Status: Discontinued
- Established: 21 December 1949; 76 years ago
- Ribbon of the prize

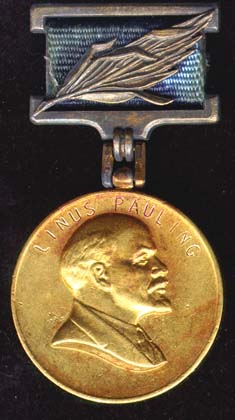
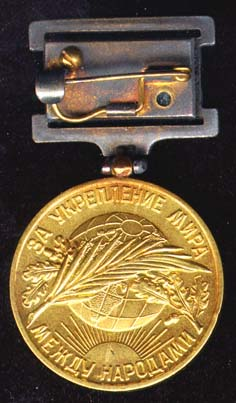
Obverse and reverse of the Lenin Peace Prize Medal

The International Lenin Peace Prize (Russian: международная Ленинская премия мира, romanized: mezhdunarodnaya Leninskaya premiya mira) was a Soviet Union award named in honor of Vladimir Lenin. It was awarded by a panel appointed by the Soviet government to notable individuals whom the panel indicated had "strengthened peace among comrades". It was founded as the International Stalin Prize for Strengthening Peace Among Peoples, but was renamed the International Lenin Prize for Strengthening Peace Among Peoples (Международная Ленинская премия «За укрепление мира между народами», Mezhdunarodnaya Leninskaya premiya "Za ukrepleniye mira mezhdu narodami") as a result of de-Stalinization. Unlike the Nobel Prize, the Lenin Peace Prize was usually awarded to several people a year rather than to just one individual. The prize was mainly awarded to prominent communists and supporters of the Soviet Union who were not Soviet citizens. Notable recipients include W. E. B. Du Bois, Fidel Castro, Lázaro Cárdenas, Salvador Allende, Mikis Theodorakis, Seán MacBride, Angela Davis, Pablo Picasso, Oscar Niemeyer, Faiz Ahmad Faiz, Abdul Sattar Edhi, Funmilayo Ransome-Kuti, CV Raman, Mihail Sadoveanu, Nelson Mandela and Kwame Nkrumah. As of 2026, the only living prize laureate is Angela Davis.

== History ==
The prize was created as the International Stalin Prize for Strengthening Peace Among Peoples on December 21, 1949, by executive order of the Presidium of the Supreme Soviet in honor of Joseph Stalin's seventieth birthday (although this was after his seventy-first).

Following Nikita Khrushchev's denunciation of Stalin in 1956 during the Twentieth Party Congress, the prize was renamed on September 6 as the International Lenin Prize for Strengthening Peace Among Peoples. All previous recipients were asked to return their Stalin Prizes so they could be replaced by the renamed Lenin Prize. By a decision of Presidium of the Supreme Soviet of the USSR of December 11, 1989, the prize was renamed the International Lenin Peace Prize. Two years later, after the collapse of USSR in 1991, the Russian government, as the successor state to the defunct Soviet Union, ended the award program. The Lenin Peace Prize is regarded as a counterpart to the existing Nobel Peace Prize.

The International Lenin Prize should not be confused with the International Peace Prize, awarded by the World Peace Council. In 1941 the Soviet Union created the Stalin Prize (later renamed the USSR State Prize), which was awarded annually to accomplished Soviet writers, composers, artists and scientists.

== Stalin Prize recipients ==
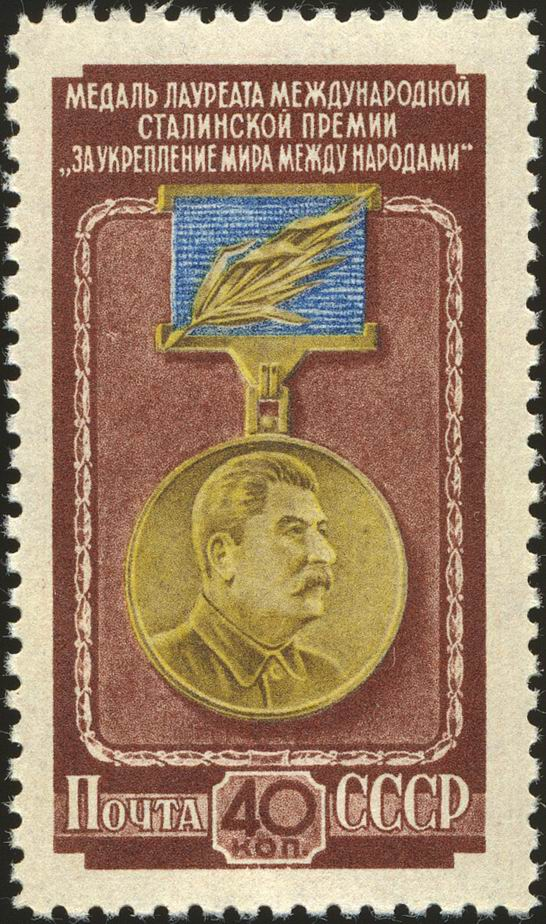
Stalin Peace Prize medal depicted on a 1953 stamp

Year	Picture	Name	Occupation	Country	Notes
1950		Eugénie Cotton (1881–1967)	Scientist, President of the Women's International Democratic Federation	France	Awarded 6 April 1951
1950		Heriberto Jara Corona (1879–1968)	Politician, revolutionary	Mexico	Awarded 6 April 1951
1950		Hewlett Johnson (1874–1966)	Church of England priest, Dean of Manchester (1924–1931), Dean of Canterbury (1931–1963)	United Kingdom	Awarded 6 April 1951
1950		Frédéric Joliot-Curie (1900–1958)	Physicist, Member of the French Academy of Sciences, Professor at the Collège de France, President of the World Peace Council (1950–1958), Nobel laureate in Chemistry (1935)	France	Awarded 6 April 1951
1950		Arthur Moulton (1873–1962)	Episcopal Bishop of Utah	United States	Declined
1950		Pak Chong-ae (1907–after 1986)	Workers' Party of North Korea politician, Chairwoman of the Korean Democratic Women's League (1945–1965)	North Korea	Awarded 6 April 1951
1950		Soong Ching-ling (1893–1981)	Revolutionary Committee of the Chinese Kuomintang politician, Vice President of China (1949–1954; 1959–1975)	China	Awarded 6 April 1951
1951		Jorge Amado (1912–2001)	Writer, Member of the Brazilian Academy of Letters (1961–2001)	Brazil	Awarded 20 December 1951
1951		Monica Felton (1906–1970)	Town planner, feminist, politician	United Kingdom	Awarded 20 December 1951
1951		Guo Moruo (1892–1978)	Writer, scientist, politician, President of the Chinese Academy of Sciences (1949–1978)	China	Awarded 20 December 1951
1951		Pietro Nenni (1891–1980)	Italian Socialist Party politician, Minister of Foreign Affairs of Italy (1946–1947; 1968–1969), Deputy Prime Minister of Italy (1963–1968)	Italy	Awarded 20 December 1951
1951		Oyama Ikuo (1889–1955)	Politician, Member of the House of Councillors of Japan	Japan	Awarded 20 December 1951
1951		Anna Seghers (1900–1983)	Writer, Socialist Unity Party politician, founding member of the DDR Academy of Arts	East Germany	Awarded 20 December 1951
1952		Johannes R. Becher (1891–1958)	Writer, Socialist Unity Party politician, founding member of the DDR Academy of Arts	East Germany	Awarded 20 December 1952
1952		Elisa Branco (1912–2001)	Brazilian Communist Party politician, Vice President of the Council of Brazilian Advocates for Peace (1949–1960)	Brazil	Awarded 20 December 1952
1952		Ilya Ehrenburg (1891–1967)	Writer, journalist, war correspondent for World War I, the Spanish Civil War, and World War II	Soviet Union	Awarded 20 December 1952
1952		James Gareth Endicott (1898–1993)	United Church of Canada clergyman, founder of Canadian Peace Congress,	Canada	Awarded 20 December 1952
1952		Yves Farge (1899–1953)	Journalist, politician	France	Awarded 20 December 1952
1952		Halldór Laxness (1902–1998)	Writer, Nobel laureate in Literature (1955)	Iceland	Awarded 20 December 1952
1952		Saifuddin Kitchlew (1888–1963)	Barrister, politician, Vice President of the World Peace Council (1955–1959), President of the All-India Peace Council	India	Awarded 20 December 1952
1952		Paul Robeson (1898–1976)	Singer, actor, civil rights movement activist,	United States	Awarded 20 December 1952
1953		Andrea Andreen (1888–1972)	Physician, educator, Chairman of the Swedish Women's Left-Wing Association (1946–1964), Vice President of the Women's International Democratic Federation	Sweden	Awarded 12 December 1953
1953		John Desmond Bernal (1901–1971)	Scientist, Professor at Birkbeck College, University of London, Fellow of the Royal Society (1937), President of the World Peace Council (1959–1965)	Ireland	Awarded 12 December 1953
1953		Isabelle Blume (1892–1975)	Belgian Labour Party politician, Member of the Belgian Chamber of Representatives for Brussels (1936–1954), President of the World Peace Council (1965–1969)	Belgium	Awarded 12 December 1953
1953		Pierre Cot (1895–1977)	Radical Party politician, Member of the National Assembly of France for Savoie and Rhône (1928–1940)	France	Awarded 12 December 1953
1953		Howard Fast (1914–2003)	Writer, 1952 American Labor Party presidential candidate	United States	Awarded 12 December 1953
1953		Andrea Gaggero (1916–1988)	Priest	Italy	Awarded 12 December 1953
1953		Leon Kruczkowski (1900–1962)	Writer, Member of the Sejm (1947–1962)	Poland	Awarded 12 December 1953
1953		Pablo Neruda (1904–1973)	Poet, diplomat, Nobel laureate in Literature (1971)	Chile	Awarded 12 December 1953
1953		Nina Popova (1908–1994)	Politician, Secretary of the All-Union Central Council of Trade Unions (1945–1957)	Soviet Union	Awarded 12 December 1953
1953		Sahib Singh Sokhey (1887–1971)	Biochemist, Member of the Indian Academy of Sciences, Assistant Director General of the World Health Organization (1949–1952)	India	Awarded 12 December 1953
1954		André Bonnard (1888–1959)	Scholar, writer, Professor at the University of Lausanne	Switzerland	Awarded 18 December 1954
1954		Bertolt Brecht (1898–1956)	Playwright, poet, theatre director	Austria (citizenship); East Germany (residence)	Awarded 18 December 1954
1954		Nicolás Guillén (1902–1989)	Poet	Cuba	Awarded 18 December 1954
1954		Felix Iversen (1887–1973)	Mathematician, Professor at the University of Helsinki, Chairman of the Peace Union of Finland	Finland	Awarded 18 December 1954
1954		Thakin Kodaw Hmaing (1876–1964)	Poet	Burma	Awarded 18 December 1954
1954		Alain Le Léap (1905–1986)	Trade unionist, General Secretary of the General Confederation of Labour (1948–1957)	France	Awarded 18 December 1954
1954		Prijono (1907–1969)	Academic, Dean of the Faculty of Letters of the University of Indonesia (1950–1956)	Indonesia	Awarded 18 December 1954
1954		Denis Pritt (1887–1972)	Barrister, Labour Independent Group politician, Member of Parliament of the United Kingdom for Hammersmith North (1935–1950)	United Kingdom	Awarded 18 December 1954
1954		Baldomero Sanín Cano (1861–1957)	Essayist, linguist, journalist	Colombia	Awarded 18 December 1954
1955		Muhammad al-Ashmar (1892–1960)	Rebel commander in Great Syrian Revolt and 1936–1939 Arab revolt in Palestine, Syrian Communist Party politician	Syria	Awarded 9 December 1955
1955		Lázaro Cárdenas (1895–1970)	Mexican Army general, Institutional Revolutionary Party politician, President of Mexico (1934–1940)	Mexico	Awarded 9 December 1955
1955		Ragnar Forbech (1894–1975)	Priest, Chaplain of Oslo Cathedral (1947–1964)	Norway	Awarded 9 December 1955
1955		Seki Akiko (1899–1973)	Singer	Japan	Awarded 9 December 1955
1955		Tôn Đức Thắng (1888–1980)	Communist Party of Vietnam politician, Chairman of the National Assembly of North Vietnam (1955–1960), President of North Vietnam (1969–1976), President of Vietnam (1976–1980)	Vietnam	Awarded 9 December 1955
1955		Karl Joseph Wirth (1879–1956)	Bund der Deutschen politician, Chancellor of the Weimar Republic (1921–1922)	West Germany	Awarded 9 December 1955
Unknown year (before 1953)		Martin Andersen Nexø (1869–1954)	Writer	Denmark	

== Lenin Prize recipients ==
Year	Picture	Name	Occupation	Country	Notes
1957		Louis Aragon (1897–1982)	Poet	France	
1957		Emmanuel d'Astier de La Vigerie (1900–1969)	Journalist, former French Resistance partisan, Union progressiste politician, Minister of the Interior of the Provisional Government of the French Republic (1943–1944), Member of the National Assembly of France for Ille-et-Vilaine (1945–1958)	France	
1957		Heinrich Brandweiner (1910–1997)	Jurist, Chairman of the Peace Council of Austria	Austria	
1957		Danilo Dolci (1924–1997)	Social activist, educator, sociologist	Italy	
1957		María Rosa Oliver (1898–1977)	Writer, essayist	Argentina	
1957		Udakendawala Siri Saranankara Thero (1902–1966)	Buddhist monk	Ceylon	
1957		Nikolai Tikhonov (1896–1979)	Writer, Chairman of the Soviet Peace Committee (1949–1979)	Soviet Union	
1958		C. V. Raman (1888–1970)	Physicist, Professor at the University of Calcutta, Founder and President of the Indian Academy of Sciences (1934–1970)	India	Awarded on 14 June 1958
1958		Josef Hromádka (1889–1969)	Evangelical Church of Czech Brethren theologian, founder of the Christian Peace Conference	Czechoslovakia	
1958		Artur Lundkvist (1906–1991)	Writer, literary critic, Member of the Swedish Academy (1968–1991)	Sweden	
1958		Louis Saillant (1906–1991)	Trade unionist, General Secretary of the World Federation of Trade Unions (1945–1969)	France	
1958		Kaoru Yasui (1907–1980)	Jurist, scholar, Professor at the University of Tokyo, Chairman of the Japan Council Against Atomic and Hydrogen Bombs (1954–1965)	Japan	
1958		Arnold Zweig (1887–1968)	Writer	East Germany	
1959		Otto Buchwitz (1879–1964)	Politician, Member of the Reichstag (1924–1933), Member of the Volkskammer (1946–1964)	East Germany	Awarded 30 April 1959
1959		W. E. B. Du Bois (1868–1963)	Sociologist, historian, civil rights movement activist, professor at Atlanta University, founder of the NAACP	United States	Awarded 30 April 1959
1959		Nikita Khrushchev (1894–1971)	Politician, First Secretary of the Communist Party of the Soviet Union (1953–1964)	Soviet Union	Awarded 30 April 1959
1959		Ivor Montagu (1904–1984)	Filmmaker, critic	United Kingdom	Awarded 30 April 1959
1959		Kostas Varnalis (1884–1974)	Poet	Greece	Awarded 30 April 1959
1960		Laurent Casanova (1906–1972)	French Communist Party politician, Member of the National Assembly of France for Seine-et-Marne(1945–1958)	France	Awarded 3 May 1960
1960		Cyrus S. Eaton (1883–1979)	Industrialist, organizer of Pugwash Conferences on Science and World Affairs	Canada; United States	Awarded 3 May 1960
1960		Aziz Sharif (1904–1990)	Politician, Chairman of the Peace Partisans Organization of Iraq	Iraq	Awarded 3 May 1960
1960		Sukarno (1901–1970)	Politician, Indonesian National Revolution commander, President of Indonesia (1945–1967)	Indonesia	Awarded 3 May 1960
1961		Fidel Castro (1926–2016)	Politician, leader of Cuban Revolution, Prime Minister of Cuba (1959–1976), President of Cuba (1976–2008)	Cuba	Awarded 30 April 1961
1961		Ostap Dłuski (1892–1964)	Politician, Member of the Sejm (1961–1964)	Poland	Awarded 30 April 1961
1961		Bill Morrow (1888–1980)	Australian Labor Party (Tasmanian Branch) politician, Member of the Australian Senate (1947–1953)	Australia	Awarded 30 April 1961
1961		Rameshwari Nehru (1886–1966)	Social worker, founder of the All India Women's Conference	India	Awarded 30 April 1961
1961		Mihail Sadoveanu (1880–1961)	Writer	Romania	Awarded 30 April 1961
1961		Antoine Tabet (1907–1964)	Architect, Chairman of the Lebanese National Peace Council	Lebanon	Awarded 30 April 1961
1961		Ahmed Sékou Touré (1922–1984)	Democratic Party of Guinea politician, President of Guinea (1958–1984)	Guinea	Awarded 30 April 1961
1962		István Dobi (1898–1968)	Politician, Prime Minister of Hungary (1948–1952)	Hungary	Awarded 30 April 1962
1962		Faiz Ahmad Faiz (1911–1984)	Poet	Pakistan	Awarded 30 April 1962
1962		Kwame Nkrumah (1909–1972)	Convention People's Party politician, Prime Minister of Ghana (1957–1960), President of Ghana (1960–1966)	Ghana	Awarded 30 April 1962
1962		Pablo Picasso (1881–1973)	Painter, sculptor	Spain	Awarded 30 April 1962
1962		Olga Poblete (1908–1999)	Teacher, feminist, Professor at the University of Chile, President of the Chilean Movement of Advocates for Peace	Chile	Awarded 30 April 1962
1963		Manolis Glezos (1922–2020)	Communist Party of Greece politician, Greek Resistance/Greek Civil War guerilla	Greece	Awarded 1 May 1963
1963		Modibo Keïta (1915–1977)	Politician, President of Mali (1960–1968)	Mali	Awarded 1 May 1963
1963		Oscar Niemeyer (1907–2012)	Architect, helped design Brasília and Headquarters of the United Nations	Brazil	Awarded 1 May 1963
1963		Georgi Traykov (1898–1975)	Bulgarian Agrarian National Union politician, Chairman of the National Assembly of Bulgaria (1964–1971)	Bulgaria	Awarded 1 May 1963
1964		Rafael Alberti (1902–1999)	Poet	Spain	Awarded 1 May 1964
1964		Aruna Asaf Ali (1909–1996)	Communist Party of India politician, Indian independence movement activist, Vice President of the Women's International Democratic Federation	India	Presented 14 August 1965
1964		Ahmed Ben Bella (1916–2012)	National Liberation Front politician, Algerian War revolutionary, President of Algeria (1963–1965)	Algeria	Awarded 1 May 1964
1964		Herluf Bidstrup (1912–1988)	Cartoonist, illustrator	Denmark	Awarded 1 May 1964
1964		Dolores Ibárruri (1895–1989)	Politician, General Secretary of the Communist Party of Spain (1942–1960)	Spain	Awarded 1 May 1964
1964		Ota Kaoru (1912–1998)	Trade unionist, Chairman of the General Council of Trade Unions of Japan (1955–1966)	Japan	Awarded 1 May 1964
1964		Gordon Schaffer (1905–1997)	Journalist and trade unionist	United Kingdom	
1965		Peter Ayodele Curtis Joseph (1920–2006)	Politician	Nigeria	
1965		Jamsrangiin Sambuu (1895–1972)	Politician, Chairman of the Presidium of the People's Great Khural (1954–1972)	Mongolia	
1965		Mirjam Vire-Tuominen (1919–2011)	Politician, General Secretary of the Finnish Peace Committee (1949–1975), General Secretary of the Women's International Democratic Federation (1978–1987), Member of the Parliament of Finland (1970–1979)	Finland	
1966		David Alfaro Siqueiros (1896–1974)	Painter	Mexico	Awarded 1 May 1967
1966		Miguel Ángel Asturias (1899–1974)	Writer, diplomat, Nobel laureate in Literature (1967)	Guatemala	
1966		Bram Fischer (1908–1975)	Advocate, anti-apartheid activist, Communist Party of South Africa politician,	South Africa	Awarded 1 May 1967
1966		Rockwell Kent (1882–1971)	Painter, printmaker, adventurer	United States	Awarded 1 May 1967
1966		Ivan Málek (1909–1994)	Microbiologist, Professor at Charles University, Member of the National Assembly of Czechoslovakia (1960–1968)	Czechoslovakia	Awarded 1 May 1967
1966		Giacomo Manzù (1908–1991)	Sculptor	Italy	
1966		Martin Niemöller (1892–1984)	Lutheran pastor, theologian, founder of Confessing Church, President of the Protestant Church in Hesse and Nassau (1949–1961), President of the World Council of Churches (1961–1968)	West Germany	Awarded 1 May 1967
1966		Herbert Warnke (1902–1975)	Trade unionist, Chairman of the Free German Trade Union Federation (1946–1975)	East Germany	Awarded 1 May 1967
1967		Romesh Chandra (1919–2016)	Communist Party of India politician, President of the World Peace Council (1977–1990)	India	
1967		Jean Effel (1908–1982)	Illustrator, journalist	France	
1967		Joris Ivens (1898–1989)	Documentary filmmaker	Netherlands	
1967		Nguyễn Thị Định (1920–1992)	Liberation Army of South Vietnam general, National Liberation Front politician, Vice President of Vietnam (1987–1992)	Vietnam/ Republic of South Vietnam	
1967		Endre Sík (1891–1978)	Politician, historian, Minister of Foreign Affairs of Hungary (1958–1961)	Hungary	
1967		Jorge Zalamea Borda (1905–1969)	Writer, politician	Colombia	
1968–1969		Akira Iwai (1922–1997)	Trade unionist, General Secretary of the General Council of Trade Unions of Japan	Japan	Awarded 16 April 1970
1968–1969		Jarosław Iwaszkiewicz (1894–1980)	Writer	Poland	Awarded 16 April 1970
1968–1969		Khaled Mohieddin (1922–2018)	Egyptian Army major, National Progressive Unionist Party politician, Chairman of the Egyptian Peace Council	UAR	Awarded 16 April 1970
1968–1969		Linus Pauling (1901–1994)	Chemist, educator, Nobel laureate in Chemistry (1954), Nobel Peace Prize laureate (1962)	United States	Awarded 16 April 1970
1968–1969		Shafie Ahmed el Sheikh (1924–1971)	Trade unionist, politician	Sudan	Awarded 16 April 1970
1968–1969		Bertil Svahnström (1907–1972)	Journalist, writer	Sweden	Awarded 16 April 1970
1970–1971		Hikmat Abu Zayd (1922/1923–2011)	Arab Socialist Union politician, academic, Minister of Social Affairs of the United Arab Republic (1962–1965)	UAR	
1970–1971		Eric Burhop (1911–1980)	Physicist, Professor at University College London, Fellow of the Royal Society (1963)	Australia; United Kingdom	
1970–1971		Ernst Busch (1900–1980)	Singer, actor	East Germany	
1970–1971		Tsola Dragoycheva (1898–1993)	Bulgarian Communist Party politician, Member of the National Assembly of Bulgaria (1946–1990)	Bulgaria	
1970–1971		Renato Guttuso (1912–1987)	Painter	Italy	
1970–1971		Kamal Jumblatt (1917–1977)	Progressive Socialist Party politician, Member of the Parliament of Lebanon (1947–1977)	Lebanon	
1970–1971		Funmilayo Ransome-Kuti (1900–1978)	Teacher, leader of Abeokuta Women's Revolt, women's rights activist	Nigeria	
1970–1971		Alfredo Varela (1914–1984)	Writer	Argentina	
1972		James Aldridge (1918–2015)	Writer	Australia; United Kingdom	Awarded 1 May 1973
1972		Salvador Allende (1908–1973)	Politician, physician, President of Chile (1970–1973)	Chile	Awarded 1 May 1973
1972		Leonid Brezhnev (1906–1982)	Politician, General Secretary of the Communist Party of the Soviet Union (1964–1982)	Soviet Union	Awarded 1 May 1973
1972		Enrique Pastorino (1918–1995)	Trade unionist, Communist Party of Uruguay politician, President of the World Federation of Trade Unions (1969–1975)	Uruguay	Awarded 1 May 1973
1973–1974		Luis Corvalán (1916–2010)	Politician, General Secretary of the Communist Party of Chile (1958–1990)	Chile	
1973–1974		Raymond Goor (1908–1996)	Priest	Belgium	
1973–1974		Jeanne Martin Cissé (1926–2017)	Politician, teacher	Guinea	
1973–1974		Sam Nujoma (1929–2025)	Politician, anti-apartheid activist, leader of SWAPO during the South African Border War, President of Namibia (1990–2005)	South West Africa (before 1990); Namibia (after 1990)	
1975–1976		Hortensia Bussi de Allende (1913–2009)	Educator, librarian, First Lady of Chile (1970–1973)	Chile	Widow of Salvador Allende (recipient in 1972); Awarded May 1977
1975–1976		János Kádár (1912–1989)	Politician, General Secretary of the Hungarian Socialist Workers' Party (1956–1988)	Hungary	Awarded May 1977
1975–1976		Seán MacBride (1904–1988)	Clann na Poblachta politician, barrister, International chairman of Amnesty International (1965–1974), Assistant Secretary-General of the United Nations, Nobel Peace Prize laureate (1974)	Ireland; France	Awarded May 1977
1975–1976		Samora Machel (1933–1986)	FRELIMO politician, Mozambican War of Independence revolutionary, President of Mozambique (1975–1986)	Mozambique	Awarded May 1977
1975–1976		Agostinho Neto (1922–1979)	MPLA politician, revolutionary, President of Angola (1975–1979)	Angola	Awarded May 1977
1975–1976		Pierre Pouyade (1911–1979)	French Air Force brigadier general, Chairman of the Franco-Soviet Friendship Association	France	Awarded May 1977
1975–1976		Yiannis Ritsos (1909–1990)	Poet	Greece	Awarded May 1977
1977–1978		Kurt Bachmann (1909–1997)	Politician, Chairman of the German Communist Party (1969–1973)	West Germany	Awarded 1 May 1979
1977–1978		Freda Brown (1919–2009)	Politician, President of the Women's International Democratic Federation (1975–1989)	Australia	Awarded 1 May 1979
1977–1978		Vilma Espín (1930–2007)	Revolutionary, politician, President of the Federation of Cuban Women (1960–2007)	Cuba	Awarded 1 May 1979
1977–1978		K. P. S. Menon (1898–1982)	Diplomat, Foreign Secretary of India (1948–1952)	India	Awarded 1 May 1979
1977–1978		Halina Skibniewska (1921–2011)	Architect, politician, Deputy Marshal of the Sejm (1971–1985)	Poland	Awarded 1 May 1979
1979		Hervé Bazin (1911–1996)	Writer	France	Awarded 30 April 1980
1979		Angela Davis (born 1944)	Communist Party USA/CCDS member, second-wave feminist/anti-Vietnam War/prison abolition activist, academic, Professor at the University of California, Santa Cruz	United States	Awarded 30 April 1980
1979		Urho Kekkonen (1900–1986)	Politician, lawyer, President of Finland (1956–1982)	Finland	Awarded 30 April 1980
1979		Abd al-Rahman al-Khamisi (1920–1987)	Poet, composer	Egypt	Awarded 30 April 1980
1979		Lê Duẩn (1907–1986)	Politician, General Secretary of the Communist Party of Vietnam (1960–1986)	Vietnam	Awarded 30 April 1980
1979		Miguel Otero Silva (1908–1985)	Writer, journalist	Venezuela	Awarded 30 April 1980
1980–1982		Mahmoud Darwish (1941–2008)	Poet	Palestine	Awarded May 1983
1980–1982		John Hanly Morgan (1918–2018)	Unitarian minister	United States; Canada	Awarded May 1983
1980–1982		Líber Seregni (1916–2004)	Broad Front politician, Uruguayan Army officer	Uruguay	Awarded May 1983
1980–1982		Mikis Theodorakis (1925–2021)	Composer	Greece	Awarded May 1983
1983–1984		Charilaos Florakis (1914–2005)	Politician, General Secretary of the Communist Party of Greece (1972–1989)	Greece	Awarded September 1984
1983–1984		Indira Gandhi (1917–1984)	Politician, Prime Minister of India (1980–1984), (1966–1977)	India	Awarded posthumously on 1 May 1985
1983–1984		Jean-Marie Legay (1925–2012)	Academic	France	Awarded 1 May 1985
1983–1984		Nguyễn Hữu Thọ (1910–1996)	Politician, Chairman of the Provisional Revolutionary Government of the Republic of South Vietnam (1969–1976), Vice President of Vietnam (1976–1992), Acting President of Vietnam (1980–1981), Chairman of the National Assembly of Vietnam (1981–1987)	Vietnam/ Republic of South Vietnam	Awarded 1 May 1985
1983–1984		Eva Palmær (1904–1995)	Writer, chemist, Chairwoman of the Sweden-Soviet Union Association (1979–1987)	Sweden	Awarded 1 May 1985
1983–1984		Luis Vidales (1904–1990)	Poet	Colombia	Awarded 1 May 1985
1983–1984		Josef Weber (1908–1985)	Politician, peace activist	West Germany	Awarded 1 May 1985
1985–1986		Miguel d'Escoto Brockmann (1933–2017)	Sandinista National Liberation Front politician, Catholic Church priest, Foreign Minister of Nicaragua (1979–1990), President of the United Nations General Assembly (2008–2009)	Nicaragua	
1985–1986		Dorothy Hodgkin (1910–1994)	Chemist, Fellow of the Royal Society (1947), Nobel laureate in Chemistry (1964)	United Kingdom	
1985–1986		Herbert Mies (1929–2017)	Politician, Chairman of the German Communist Party (1973–1989)	West Germany	
1985–1986		Julius Nyerere (1922–1999)	Politician, anti-colonial activist, President of Tanzania (1964–1985)	Tanzania	
1985–1986		Petur Tanchev (1920–1992)	Politician, Member of the National Assembly of Bulgaria (1950–1990)	Bulgaria	
1988		Abdul Sattar Edhi (1928–2016)	Philanthropist, ascetic	Pakistan	
1990		Nelson Mandela (1918–2013)	Politician, founder of African National Congress, anti-apartheid activist, President of South Africa (1994–1999), Nobel Peace Prize laureate (1993)	South Africa	Unable to accept the prize until 2002 due to his trial and imprisonment in South Africa

== See also ==
- Atoms for Peace Award
