= Doris McRae =

Australian activist (1893–1988)

- Born: Doris Mary McRae; 25 January 1893; Pakenham, Victoria, Australia
- Died: 9 November 1988 (aged 95); East Brighton, Victoria, Australia
- Education: University of Melbourne
- Occupations: School teacher; Headmistress; Feminist; activist

Doris Mary McRae (25 January 1893 – 9 November 1988) was an Australian schoolteacher, headmistress and women's activist.

She was born at Pakenham to teamster Donald McRae and Mary Jane, née Broad. She was educated at Pakenham State School before winning a scholarship to Melbourne Continuation School, returning to Pakenham as an assistant teacher in 1910. She soon enrolled in the University of Melbourne as an arts student, and by September 1914 was teaching at Faraday Street State School in Carlton. In 1916, she moved to secondary teaching and worked at Echuca High School; she would spend the next thirty-four years as a teacher in a number of schools. She was also a political activist, joining the Australian Student Christian Movement and the Student Peace Group in 1914, and the Free Religious Fellowship in the 1920s. In 1935, she joined the Movement Against War and Fascism and was a founding member of the Teachers' Peace Movement.

McRae was also active in teachers' unions, serving on the Victorian Teachers' Union council from 1934 (vice-president 1941–47). She was deeply involved in the establishment of an independent tribunal for teachers in 1946 and supported the VTU affiliating with the Trades Hall Council and the Australian Council of Trade Unions. She became headmistress of Flemington Girls High School in 1942, and served on the Victorian committee of the Women's Charter Conference and the Council for Women in War Work during the Second World War. From 1929 to 1930 she had gone on exchange to Scotland, and she travelled to Vancouver, England and the Soviet Union in 1937 as part of the Pan Pacific Women's Conference. She joined the Communist Party of Australia and the Australian-Soviet Friendship League on her return to Australia.

McRae's communist affiliations led her activities to be watched closely by the Commonwealth Investigation Service, and she was the subject of heated debate in the Victorian Parliament in 1946. Defeated for VTU office in 1948, a relentless anti-communist campaign saw her retire from teaching in poor health in 1950. She stood as a Communist candidate for the federal seat of Henty in 1951, but subsequently focused more on women's issues as a foundation member of the Union of Australian Women (1950). She was the Victorian delegate to the Defence of Children conference in Vienna in 1952 and served as the UAW's president from 1964 to 1966. McRae died at East Brighton in 1988. Her body was donated to the University of Melbourne's anatomy department.

McRae was posthumously inducted onto the Victorian Honour Roll of Women.
