= Joan Curlewis =

Australian women's rights activist (died 1982)

- Died: 11 March 1982; Melbourne
- Occupations: Women's rights activist; Unionist
- Spouse: Dick Curlewis

Joan Curlewis was an Australian advocate of equal pay for women and a key member of the Union of Australian Women in Victoria and a former president of the national body.

== Biography ==
Curlewis was a mainstay of the Union of Australian Women in Victoria. She played a key role in the production of both the union's monthly magazine, Our Women, and a weekly radio programme on 3CR Melbourne. These helped to maintain awareness of the problems faced by women in society. The Union of Australian Women was established in 1950 as a left-wing social change organisation that aimed to work for the status and wellbeing of women across the world.

In November 1972, Curlewis made a submission on behalf of the Union of Australian Women to the Full Bench of the Arbitration Commission on the Equal Pay - National Wage case. Curlewis was the UAW Victorian President and National Committee member at this time. In her submission she stated that "The Union of Australian Women regards equal pay for work of equal value as a basic principle of the rights of women, as a human right." Sylvie Shaw from the Women's Liberation Movement also made a submission, which were both loudly applauded. The 1969, the first federal Equal Pay case had established the principle that women who performed 'equal work' alongside men should receive equal pay. However, this judgement still deprived most women of the right of equal pay for equal work because it was not applicable "where the work in question is essentially or usually performed by females but is work upon which male employees may also be employed". Curlewis noted that this work is usually poorly paid, precisely because it is "usually performed by females'.

In Melbourne in June 1981, a National Conference on Women and Taxation was held. It was organised by the United Nations Association National Status of Women Committee, which was made up of 25 major women's organisations, including the Union of Australian Women. The UAW was represented by Curlewis and colleagues, Marj Oake and Audrey McDonald.

Research undertaken by Curlewis related to female workers in the metal industry was included in a booklet produced by the Union of Women in New South Wales as well as in a paper that she wrote for the Women and Labour Conference held in Adelaide, South Australia in June 1982.

Papers and correspondence of Joan Curlewis relating to the publication, "Women and wages in the war year, 1940-1945: Sheetmetal Workers Union" (Union of Australian Women) are held by the State Library of Victoria in a collection related to employment of women in Australia. A photocopy of a letter from Rosemary Davies to Curlewis is held by the Australian National University Archives. The letter records Curlewis's responses to questions about her work in the sheet metal industry

Curlewis died suddenly on 11 March 1982 after collapsing at the 3CR Melbourne radio studio. She had just finished taping an interview with women who had worked in the metal industry during World War II.

In 1989, when the Melbourne City Council was replanting Royal Park, the National Council of Women and its affiliates were invited to plant native trees in honour of their founders and leaders. Four of the 350 trees planted honoured members of the Union of Australian women, including Curlewis, Doris McRae, Win Graham and Annie Lloyd.

== Bibliography ==
- Union of Australian Women (1982). Women and Wages in the War Years 1940-1945 : Sheetmetal Workers’ Union. Sydney: Union of Australian Women. ISBN 0949861057.
- Curlewis, Joan (1982). Women working in heavy industry in the Second World War. In Women and Labour Conference Papers. 2 (3), 461-470. https://search.informit.org/doi/10.3316/ielapa.821113726
- Curlewis, Joan (1973). 23 Years of Carrying the Banner, UAW.
