= Stroh (disambiguation) =

Stroh is an Austrian spiced rum.

Stroh may also refer to:

- Stroh Brewery Company, a former American beer maker currently owned and operated by Pabst Brewing Company
- Stroh violin, a violin with a metal resonator and horn
- Kaycee Stroh (born 1984), an American actress
- Stroh's Ice Cream, an American ice cream brand
- Stroh, Indiana, a small town in the United States
- Jacob Gaukel Stroh (1848–1935), a tanner and local historian of Waterloo County, Ontario, Canada
- John Hans Stroh (1916–1996), Australian health advocate, businessman and researcher
- Donald A. Stroh, American World War II Major-General
- Harley Stroh, American game designer
