= Austrian Australians =

Total population
- Austrian; 17,010 (by birth, 2011); 42,341 (by ancestry, 2011)

Regions with significant populations
- New South Wales, Queensland, Victoria

Languages
- Australian English · Austrian German

Religion
- Christianity, Judaism

Related ethnic groups
- Australians of European descent, Austrian diaspora, Austrians

Austrian Australians are Australian citizens of Austrian national origin or ancestry, or a permanent residents of Australia who have migrated from Austria. There are thousands of Austrian Australians, with many tracing their history to ancestors who arrived in the gold rush during the 1850s. Others came in the aftermath of World War I; during the war, non-naturalised Austro-Hungarians in Australia were interned. The 1920 Immigration Act prevented the arrival of more Austrians, and by 1933 just 286 Austria-born people were present in Victoria alone.

In World War II, and following the Nazi take-over of Austria, a sizeable number of Austrian Jews fled to Australia. By 1942, there were over 2,000 Austrian Jews throughout the country. The number of Austrians living in the state of Victoria peaked in the 1960s at 8,615, then declined in the decades to come.

== Notable people ==
- Peter Abeles (businessman)
- Judy Cassab (artist)
- Manfred Clynes (scientist and musician)
- Bert Flugelman (sculpture artist)
- Ignaz Friedman (composer)
- Michael Gawenda (journalist)
- Gerald Ganglbauer (publisher and nudist)
- Martin Glaessner (palaeontologist)
- Richard Goldner (violist and inventor)
- Nick Greiner (Liberal Party of Australia (LPA) politician)
- Eric Gross (musician)
- Stefan Haag (singer and television director/producer)
- Louis Kahan (artist and fashion designer)
- Dick Klugman (doctor and LPA politician)
- John Newman (assassinated Australian Labor Party politician)
- Marlene Norst (linguist and philanthropist)
- Gustav Nossal (doctor)
- Heinz Reigler (artist)
- Harry Seidler (architect)
- Peter Singer (philosopher)
- Franz Stampfl (athletics coach)
- John Hans Stroh (businessman)
- Eugene von Geurard (painter)
- Eva Bacon (socialist and feminist)

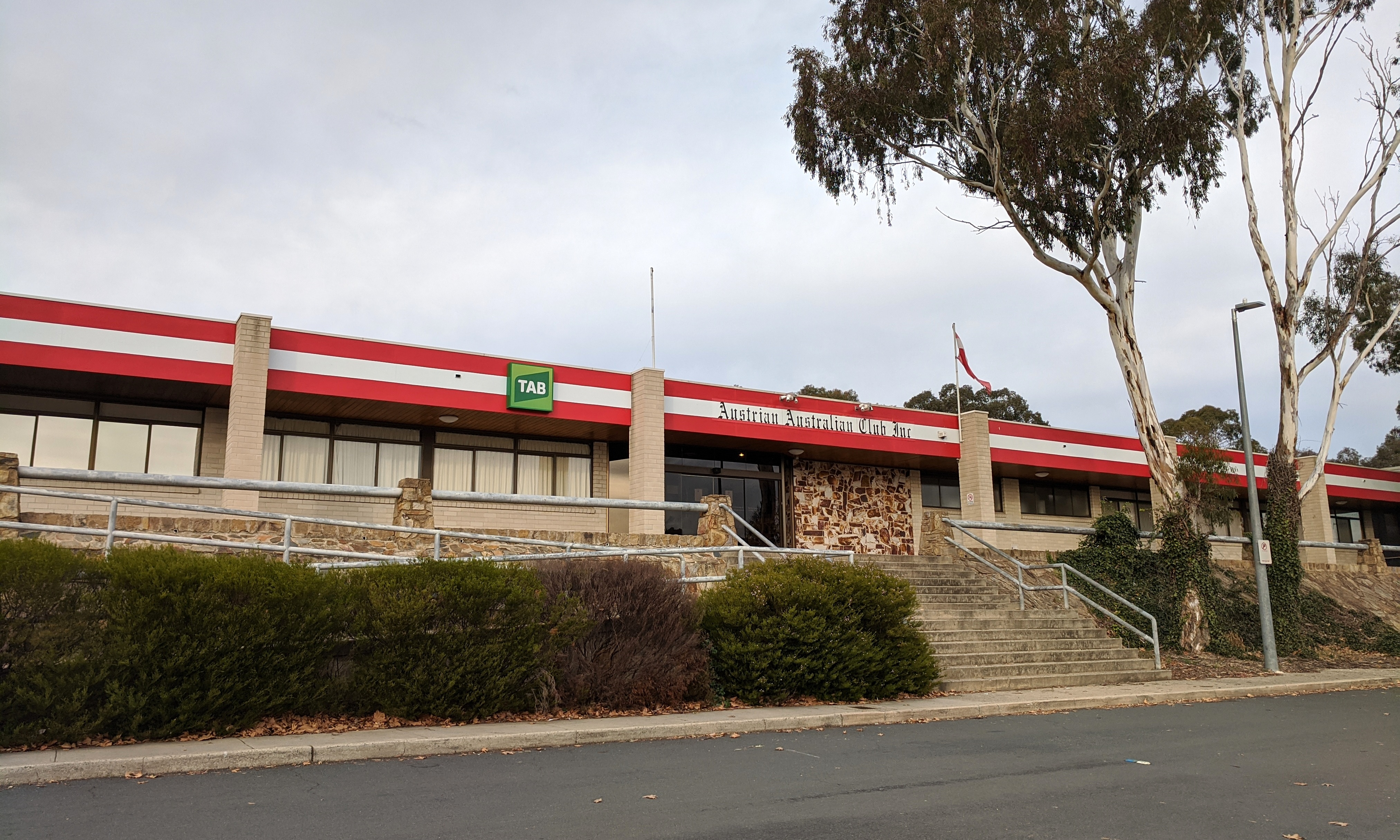
The Austrian Australian Club in Canberra

== See also ==
- Australia–Austria relations
- German Australians
