= Eric Gross =

Austrian-Australian musician (1926–2011)

Eric Gross AM (16 September 1926 – 17 April 2011) was an Austrian–Australian pianist, composer and teacher.

== Biography ==
Gross was born in Vienna and emigrated to England in 1938. From the age of fourteen, he worked as a pianist in bands and orchestras. He studied at Trinity College of Music, with Wilfrid Dunwell (piano), and the University of Aberdeen, with (among others) Reginald Barrett-Ayres, and where he received an MA in 1957 (Crotty 2001; Dorum 1997, 75). Following professional engagements in Ceylon (now Sri Lanka) and New Caledonia, he settled in Sydney in 1958.

Initially teaching at the NSW State Conservatorium of Music, he joined the staff of the department of music at the University of Sydney in 1960 and remained there until retiring in 1991 as associate professor of music. In 1989 he was visiting professor at the University of Guyana. He was president of the Fellowship of Australian Composers, and from 1981 to 1984 he was also treasurer and executive board member of the Asian Composers' League. Apart from teaching, Gross was active as composer, arranger and conductor. He received numerous commissions for film scores for Film Australia and TV scores for Screen Gems Columbia, as well as numerous commissions from the Australian Broadcasting Corporation. In 1976 he received the Albert H. Maggs Composition Award from Melbourne University.

While working as a conductor of the Pro Musica Society of Sydney University and the St. Andrew's Cathedral Choral Society, Gross wrote numerous works for the orchestras and choirs associated with these societies. Political statements were made in the orchestral work Na Shledanou v Praze (premiered in Olomouc, Czechoslovakia during a period of Russian occupation) which used the Czech national anthem as its main theme. In other works, such as the cantata Pacem in Terris (based on the encyclical by Pope John XXIII), Gross used pertinent philosophical or political texts. He is also well known for Dussekiana I-III, three suites for violin and orchestra, based on piano works by František Xaver Dušek (Anon. 2011).

In addition to a predilection for jazz idioms, Gross's worldwide travels and cultural experiences tended to give his music a cosmopolitan flavour, with traces of Austrian, Scottish, Asian and South American influences emerging from time to time. He also enjoyed experimentation, especially when a sympathetic virtuoso or ensemble such as bass-baritone Alan Light, trombonist Greg van der Struik or Adrian Hooper's Sydney Mandolins, was available.

Gross was appointed a Member of the Order of Australia in the Queen's Birthday Honours of June 1998 (Anon. 1998). On Australia Day 2006 he was declared to be the City of Canada Bay Cultural and Artistic Citizen of the Year. He remained active as a composer and examiner until shortly before his death on 17 April 2011 (Anon. n.d.). His wife Pamela died less than a week before he did (Anon. 2011).

== Selected works ==
Opera

- Amorous Judge, Opera in one act, Op. 51 (1965)

Orchestral

- Concert Overture, Op. 1 (1957)
- Sinfonietta, Op. 9 (1961)
- Antubconseas, Op. 11 (1973)
- Fanfopus, Op. 13 (1973)
- Moonscape for string orchestra, Op. 32 (1972)
- Of Strings and Things, Op. 53 (1970)
- Overture "Cymbeline", Op. 90 (1975)
- Na shledanou v Praze (Good-bye in Prague), Op. 94 (1976)
- Concertino for orchestra, Op. 108 (1979)
- Trilogy, Op. 112 (1979)
- Symphony No. 2, Op. 123 (1980)
- Fanfare Scholastic, Op. 129 (1982)
- Golden Jubilee Fantasy, Op. 158 (1987)
- Songs of Australia for string orchestra (1989)
- Little Challenge for string orchestra, Op. 254 (2002)
- Cherries in the Brook, Op. 291 (2006)

Band

- Brassophony for brass band, Op. 146 (1985)
- Concertino for brass band (1987)
- Fanfare for George for brass band, Op. 157 (1987)
- Anniversary fantasy for concert band, Op. 199 (1995)
- Anniversary fantasy revisited for concert band, Op. 199a (1996)
- Penshurst on parade for concert band, Op. 217 (1997)
- March ceremonial: Order of Australia for brass band (2002)

Concertante

- Dussekiana I for violin and orchestra (1975)
- Dussekiana II for violin and orchestra, Op. 56 (1975)
- Dussekiana III for violin and orchestra, Op. 58 (1975)
- Concerto for piano and orchestra, Op. 135 (1983)
- Concerto No. 2 for mandolin and orchestra (1986)
- Concerto for oboe and string or chamber orchestra, Op. 152 (1987)

Chamber music

- Trio for flute, oboe and clarinet, Op. 10 (1962)
- Merry Peasant Band for wind quintet, Op. 30 (1959)
- Three Bagatelles for flute solo, Op. 37 (1965)
- Eugel and Marmaduke, Duet for 2 cellos, Op. 62 (1973)
- Three Bagatelles for saxophone solo, Op. 96 (1976)
- Silas Pilgrim Trio for flute, clarinet and bassoon, Op. 97 (1977)
- Plymouth for string quartet, Op. 98 (1976)
- Drummoyne for string quartet, Op. 99 (1976)
- Six Miniatures for trumpet, trombone and tuba, Op. 103 (1978)
- Three Sketches for trumpet and piano, Op. 121 (1980)
- Study No. 1 for Misha for violin and piano, Op. 130 (1982)
- Cadenza I for mandolin solo, Op. 153, No. 1 (1986)
- Cadenza II for mandolin solo, Op. 153, No. 2 (1986)
- Cadenza III for mandolin solo, Op. 153, No. 3 (1990)
- Saxophone Quartet No. 1, Op. 155 (1987)
- Mandigar I for 2 mandolins, mandola and guitar, Op. 156 (1987)
- Paul and Adrian, Duet for 2 mandolins, Op. 165 (1989)
- Tres Piezas para Teresa for guitar solo, Op. 166 (1989)
- Two Pieces for violin and organ, Op. 167 (1989)
- Barbara and Deborah, Duet for 2 mandolins, Op. 175 (1990)
- Romance for mandolin and organ, Op. 177 (1990)
- Sonata for violin and piano, Op. 183 (1992)
- Cadenza IV for mandolin solo, Op. 185, No. 2 (1991)
- Cadenza V for mandolin solo, Op. 185, No. 3 (1991)
- Triptych for violin solo (1992)
- Mandigar II for 2 mandolins, mandola and guitar, Op. 190 (1993)
- Bagatelle for trombone and piano, Op. 196 (1994)
- Four Movements for horn, trumpet, flugelhorn and 2 trombones, Op. 201 (1995)
- Three Simple Pieces for trumpet and piano, Op. 205 (1995)
- Fantasia for trumpet and piano, Op. 213 (1996)
- Invention No. 1 for viola and piano, Op. 216, No. 1a (1998)
- Five Dialogues for 2 flutes, Op. 219 (1997)
- Concerto da camera for mandolin, violin, viola, cello, Op. 220 (1997)
- Cadenza VI for mandolin solo, Op. 220a (1998)
- Suite for trombone quartet, Op. 221 (1997)
- Sequence of Happiness for mandolin and piano, Op. 222 (1997)
- Frantaphonics for saxophone solo, Op. 228 (1998)
- Euphonism I B for viola and piano, Op. 230 (1998)
- Cadenza VII for mandolin solo, Op. 231 (1998)
- Cadenza VIII for mandolin solo, Op. 239 (1999)
- For a Gentle Soul for 2 mandolins, mandola, guitar and double bass, Op. 248 (2000)
- Sonata for mandolin and piano, Op. 251 (2001)
- Concert fantasia, for button accordion (bayan) and string quartet, op. 252 (2001)
- Three Inventions for saxophone solo, Op. 253 (2001)
- Cadenza X for mandolin solo, Op. 255 (2001)
- Euphonics for cello and piano, Op. 256 (2002)
- Euphonics II for bassoon and piano, Op. 258 (2002)
- Euphonics III for bass clarinet and piano, Op. 259 (2002)
- Altophonics for clarinet and piano, Op. 260 (2002)
- Romance Bitonal for violin and piano, Op. 263 (2002)
- Violamorosa for viola and piano, Op. 268 (2002)
- Cadenza XI for trombone solo, Op. 272 (2003)
- Cadenza XII for trombone solo, Op. 272b (2007)
- Two Cellos Go Meandering, Duet for 2 cellos, Op. 284 (2005)
- Discussion for flute and viola, Op. 296 (2006)
- Trialogue for mezzo-soprano (and claves), flute and viola, Op. 296a (2006)
- Cadenza 10.5 for mandolin solo, Op. 299 (2007)
- Suite Latin American for saxophone quartet, Op. 302 (2008)

Harpsichord

- Toccata "Not at Three", Op. 226 (1998)

Organ

- Wedding March, Op. 61 (1971)
- Two Pieces, Op. 42 (1972)
- Processional (1972)
- Organ Prelude on "The Shepherd of Bethlehem", Op. 95 (1976)
- Bridal March, Op. 104 (1978)
- Recessional, Op. 126 (1981)
- Centormedique, Op. 136 (1983)
- Postlude for Carol and Paul, Op. 218 (1997)
- Meditation on a Blessed Spirit, Op. 235 (1999)
- Sydney Sojourn, Op. 246 (2000)
- Music of the Heart, Op. 271 (2003)
- Grace of Our Lord, Op. 276 (2004)
- Mary Immaculate, Op. 277 (2004)
- Hymn to the Virgin Mary, Op. 278 (2004)
- In the Stillness of the Evening, Op. 280 (2004)
- O God beyond All Time and Space, Op. 285 (2005)

Piano

- Moon Interlude (1972)
- Little Jazzeroo (1989)
- Klavierstucke I, Op. 120 (1982)
- Klavierstucke II, Op. 127 (1982)
- Thanksgiving, Op. 149 (1986)
- Klavierstucke III, Op. 150 (1986)
- Five Simple Pieces, Op. 169 (1989)
  - No. 4 Sydney Harbour Blues (1989)
- Sonata piccola, Op. 188 (1992)
- Miniature for Ray, Op. 195 (1994)
- Glebe Island Minuet, Op. 204 (1995)
- Pensive Prelude, Op. 208 (1996)
- Nostalgic Interlude, Op. 209 (1996)
- Klavierstück IV, Op. 225 (1998)
- Klavierstück V, Op. 243 (2000)
- Idyll for Idil, Op. 244 (2000)
- Jeanelligans, Op. 247 (2000)
- Sally in the Mallee, Op. 250 (2001)
- Sallymede, Op. 262 (2002)
- Sally in a Maze, Op. 290 (2004)
- Golden Swan, Op. 292 (2006)
- Marita's Farewell, Op. 294 (2006)
- Three Fancies, Op. 298 (2007)
- Playful Sally, Op. 300 (2007)
- What Is Time, Op. 301 (2007)

Vocal

- Two Songs for soprano and piano, Op. 45 (1958)
- Five Burns Settings for bass and piano, Op. 49 (1970)
- Three Songs for soprano, clarinet and piano, Op. 139
- Sweet Silence after Bells for mezzo-soprano and piano, Op. 206 (1995)
- The Maid's Lament for mezzo-soprano, flute, viola and harp, Op. 293 (2006)
- Donne Trilogy for tenor and piano, Op. 281 (2005)
