= Union Aid Abroad – APHEDA =

Australian overseas aid agency

Australian People for Health, Education and Development Abroad
- Union Aid Abroad
- Abbreviation: APHEDA
- Formation: 1984; 42 years ago
- Founder: Helen McCue
- Headquarters: Sydney, Australia
- Region served: Southeast Asia; Pacific Islands; Middle East; Southern Africa; the Caribbean
- Executive officer: Kate Lee
- Affiliations: ACTU; ACFID
- Website: www.apheda.org.au

Australian People for Health, Education and Development Abroad (APHEDA), also known as Union Aid Abroad, is a non-government organisation of the Australian union movement. The non-government organisation was established in 1984 as the international aid agency of the Australian Council of Trade Unions. APHEDA was initiated in the pursuit of global justice through “stronger union and social movements, sustainable development programs, global solidarity and support in times of crisis” in Southeast Asia, the Pacific, the Middle East, South Africa and the Caribbean. APHEDA is also a registered charity with the Australian Charities and Not for Profits Commission.

There are four key areas in which the APHEDA organisation intends to focus on, these are dignity at work, social justice, economic equality and the realisation of human rights.

== History ==
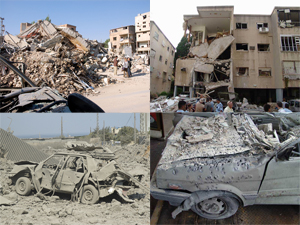
Destruction caused by Lebanon political conflicts in the 1980s

Helen McCue, a nurse practitioner originating from Australia, was employed in the Middle East as a nurse for the World Health Organization. Helen stated she was horrified by the harm to civilians which took place due to the Lebanese civil war, after the Sabra-Shatila massacre. Therefore, in 1982 she resigned from the World Health Organization to volunteer in Beirut refugee camps for the Palestinian Red Crescent.

In this volunteer position, McCue witnessed, in her words, "the deterioration of the physical, psychological, social and cultural well-being of four million Palestinians". McCue stated witness of this whilst working with the Palestinian Red Crescent was the inspiration to "broaden the base of support Palestinians and to somehow set up an organisation, based in union movement". Within Beirut refugee camps, McCue volunteered for the Palestine Red Crescent Society, a humanitarian organisation which act in the interest of the "health and welfare of the Palestinian people".

In 1983, McCue proposed the idea of a trade union-based international humanitarian organisation to Cliff Dolan, the leader of the Australian Council of Trade Unions (ACTU) at the time. This was supported and in 1984, the organisation to later be known as the Union Aid Abroad – Australian People for Health, Education and Development Abroad received its first two government grants for "humanitarian development assistance" to support overseas health workers.

At this point, the Australian Council of Trade Unions had officially contracted APHEDA as their international aid agency.

=== Key contributors ===
==== Helen McCue ====
Helen McCue was an Australian, Catholic nurse who grew up in Canberra, Australia. In the early 1980s, McCue worked for the World Health Organization as a United Nations consultant to evaluate nursing services in the Middle East. McCue then transitioned into a role at the United Nations Relief and Workers for the Agency of Palestinians. It is here McCue worked in Bekker Valley with the refugee community. After the Sabra-Shatila massacre, McCue felt as if she had "failed to protect" the refugee community in her role at the United Nations. Consequently, McCue left the organisation to volunteer in refugee camps. This inspired her to approach Cliff Dolan. McCue's intention for the development of APHEDA was to develop a network where various skilled workers with technical and vocational skills in the Australian community could “support the training of people in these refugee situations”. After founding APHEDA with Cliff Dolan in 1984, McCue was named the executive director. McCue set up several training programs in Australia for nurses abroad to develop critical nursing skills. This led to the establishment of a nurse training program in Lebanon. Further responsibilities of McCue in her time as executive director included “setting up infrastructure in Australia”, recruiting the alliance of international unions and was a key player in overseas project work, in Vietnam, the Philippines, South Africa and the Middle East.

==== Audrey McDonald ====
Audrey McDonald was a second key contributor to the APHEDA organisation in its early days. McDonald was born in Sandy Flat and relocated with her mother to the Sydney city. At 17 years old, McDonald represented the National Union of Australian Women at the 1955 Congress of the Food & Canning Workers Organisation in Sofia, Bulgaria. McDonald is said to have supported the APHEDA organisation on an ongoing basis directly and through her affiliations with the Union of Australian Women at which she was the national secretary. McDonald authored a novel with her husband Tom McDonald detailing their experiences in union aid. The funds of this novel contribute to funding a child South African nutrition project directed by APHEDA.

== Goals and objectives ==
The APHEDA organisation state their purpose is driven towards the achievement of four main areas:

1. Dignity at work
2. Social justice
3. Economic equality
4. The realisation of human rights

The organisation plans to achieve this via unions, social movements, sustainable development programs, global solidarity and crisis support.

The APHEDA organisation have identified five key values in which they endeavour to operate in line with. These values refer to solidarity, equality and justice, movement-building, accountability and partnership.

== Funding ==
APHEDA is registered with the Australian Charities and Not-for-profits Commission. The organisation derives their funding from "government funding, other grants, donations, fundraising and interest income". The Australian Department of Foreign Affairs and Trade funds several of Union-Aid-APHEDA's projects offshore. Members can pay a minimum membership fee of $15.00 a month which is also contributed to the funding of Union-Aid APHEDA's offshore projects and programs. As a registered "Australian Company Limited by Guarantee", the organisation must reinvest any profits obtained back into the charity's work. In the 2019–2020 financial year, received approximately A$2,000,000 (equivalent to $2,200,000 in 2022) in donations and bequests, A$3,600,000 (equivalent to $3,900,000 in 2022) from the Australian government and made $0 revenue from the provision of goods and services. In this time, approximately A$5,000,000 (equivalent to $5,500,000 in 2022) was spent for use outside of Australia.

== Structure ==
The governing board of APHEDA are elected by their members and the ACTU.

Board of Union-Aid APHEDA as of May 2021
Executive Officer	Kate Lee
Chairperson	Angelo Gavrielatos
Vice Chairperson	Michele O’Neil
Honorary Secretary	Marj O’Callaghan
Honorary Treasurer	Mark Lennon
Chief Finance Officer	Lois Rahayu
External expert representative	Peter Cozens
Appointment Expert	Betty Hounslow
Committee Members	Danae Bosler, Michelle Robertson, Michael Wright, Lori-Anne Sharp

Map of the world highlighting the 14 countries in which Union-Aid Australia operates across.

Volunteers of the organisation will provide unpaid services for Australian community education and/or assistance on overseas projects. In 2019–2020 financial year, volunteers devoted 330 hours to the organisation's work in community education and 3167 hours towards work on overseas projects.

Employees of APHEDA work under the Union-Aid Abroad-APHEDA Staff Agreement 2018–2019. This single enterprise agreement operates under section 185 of Fair Work Act 2009. Volunteers are not considered under this agreement.

=== Partnerships ===
APHEDA has 45 partner organisations in 14 different countries. It is proposed there are four main categories of partnership in which APHEDA engage in, they refer to:

1. Standards and guidelines development
2. Project Funding
3. Provision of services and personnel
4. Provision of goods

== Criticisms and controversies ==
In 2002, the acting prime minister John Howard's visit to Indonesia was not well received by the government officials. Government officials cancelled scheduled meetings with Howard as it was believed Australia was in support of the West Papua and Aceh independence movements. Howard claimed Australia was not in support of the political tensions in the region. However, the controversies had arisen due to Australian Aid monetary contributions towards APHEDA. At the time, APHEDA were said to be utilising funding to establish Indonesian trade union training programs. Through this, it is said APHEDA were partially responsible for the strike which occurred against the Shangri-La Hotel chain at the end of 2000 for the hotel-chain workers right to freedom of association. The strike was broken up by local police after 4 days and had several legal implications for strikers. Fines were issued to the unions and staff involved lost their job.

== Political advocacies ==
APHEDA's political advocacies are centred around eight key areas: global issues, anti-corruption, illicit drug and law enforcement, disasters and humanitarian affairs, gender issues, HIV/AIDS, tuberculosis, health and medical, peace and security, and labour conditions.

=== Gender equality ===
APHEDA work in partnership with Irish Aid. The two AID organisations have been responsible for the training of women in positions of leadership in Vietnam, across several districts, communes and provinces.

The intention of this project is to empower more women to engage in political agendas and positions of political leadership and further, for these women to advocate for gender-related concerns to ensure policies are developed and implemented include the voice of all.

This project began in October 2017 and was set to continue until August 2021. In 2020, this campaign was awarded a total of A$66,186 (equivalent to $72,571 in 2022) in Australian Department of Foreign Affairs and Trade (DFAT) funding.

=== Mae Tao Clinic ===
The Mae Tao Clinic was founded by Dr. Cynthia Maung in 1988. The organisation provides health care free of charge to assist migrants and refugees crossing the border from Burma and Thailand. APHEDA continues to support this organisation offshore from Australia and in the clinic.

=== Capacity building for Karen Women at the Thai-Myanmar Border ===
In this program, APHEDA work in partnership with the Karen's Women's Organisation (KWO) in refugee camps along the Thai-Myanmar border. The program intends to strengthen leadership skills and knowledge within the camps to ensure community services can continue to be actioned despite political instability in the region. In 2020, this program received A$52,980 (equivalent to $58,091 in 2022) in DFAT funding.

=== Campaign to ban asbestos in South-East Asia ===
This campaign is active in several areas of South-East Asia. These areas are Indonesia, Laos, Vietnam and Cambodia. It involves Australian APHEDA volunteers working with unionists and campaigners in an attempt to “ban asbestos and eliminate asbestos-related diseases”. The overall goal for this campaign is to do so to eliminate asbestos-related diseases in these regions. In 2020, the campaign pushed to reform the Rotterdam Convention. To do so, the Australian Council of Trade Unions and Union-Aid APHEDA initiated an alliance between international several trade unions and environmental non-governmental organisations. It was forecasted in the 2000-2007 period, Asia was responsible for 64% share of the global asbestos use.

In 2020, this campaign was awarded a total of A$637,785 in DFAT funding.

=== Boosting agriculture in Gaza and the West Bank ===
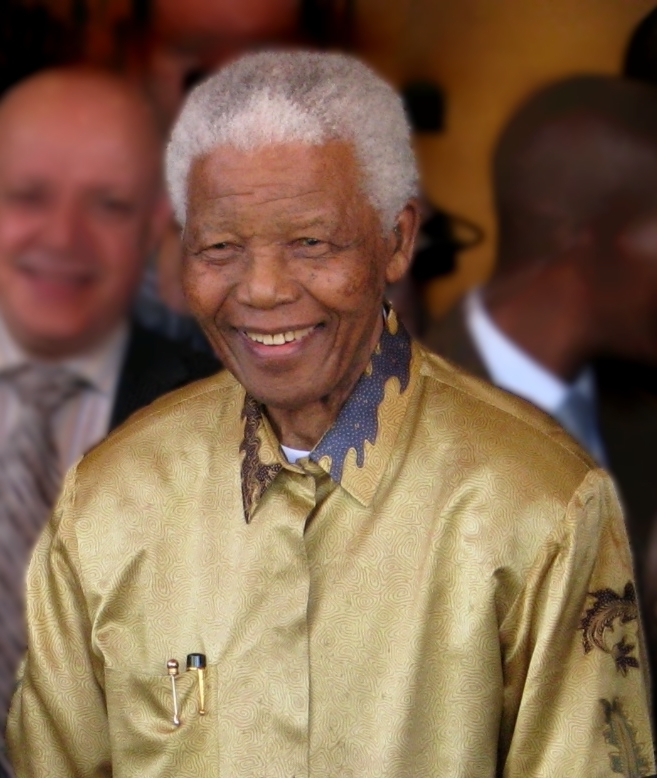
In 2010, Nelson Mandela made tribute to the work of the APHEDA. This was revealed by organisation during a Parliamentary briefing.

This APHEDA project began in 2015 in association with the MA’AN Development Centre, The Palestinian Business Women's Association – Asala and the Institute for Community Partnership of Bethlehem University.

The project has had several intentions:

- Enhance long-term profitability of small-scale farmers and producers
- Avoid toxic pesticides and improve standards
- Lower costs and reduce waste through water tanks and new agricultural roads
- Improve gender equality in farm production industries

The project has been funded by the Australia Middle East NGO Cooperation Agreement Phase 3.

=== Recognition from Nelson Mandela ===
In 2010, after Nelson Mandela’s release from prison he made tribute to the work of the APHEDA organisation. Specifically, the contribution and support APHEDA demonstrated for the anti-apartheid struggle.
