= Nola Barber =

Australian mayor and community worker

Nola Barber OBE
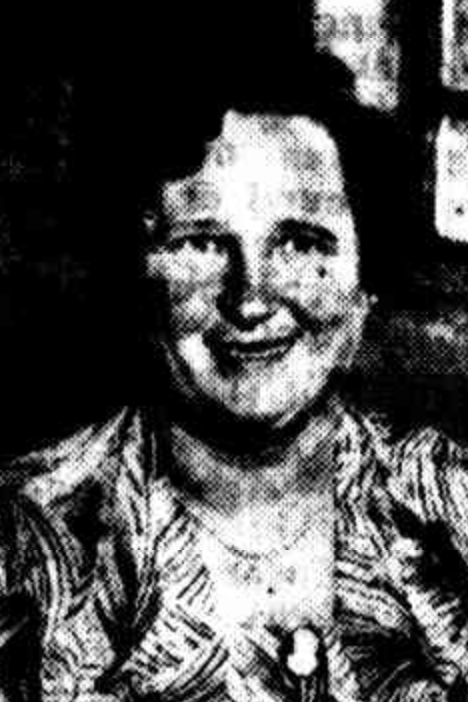
- Nola Barber, 1954
- Born: Nola Isabel Constance Griffiths; 27 December 1901; Woodend, Victoria
- Died: 29 December 1985 (aged 84); Colac, Victoria
- Occupations: councillor, mayor and community worker

Nola Isabel Constance Barber OBE (27 December 1901 – 29 December 1985) was an Australian mayor and community worker.

Born at Woodend in Victoria to estate agent William Oswald Griffiths and Elizabeth, née Dick, Nola was educated in Melbourne and graduated from the College of Domestic Economy, after which she was a teacher in Melbourne and Geelong. After studying part-time at the University of Melbourne from 1926 to 1939, she gave up teaching in 1940. On 12 March 1940 she married law clerk David Reaburn Barber, and the couple settled at Aspendale.

Barber was elected to Chelsea City Council in 1948, serving until 1957 and again from 1960 to 1975. She was mayor from 1962 to 1963, the first woman to hold that position. A left-leaning councillor, she campaigned for a trained social worker for the area, the establishment of Meals on Wheels, kindergartens, a local library, a sewerage authority, a spastic centre and elderly citizens' club. She was also a strong supporter of increased federal funding for schools and attended the National Education Congress in 1963.

Barber was active in the local community as president of the Aspendale Technical School council, executive member of the Technical Schools Association of Victoria and member of the Aspendale Elderly Citizens' Club, Chelsea Citizens Advice Bureau, Chelsea Community Health Centre, City of Chelsea Historical Society Girl Guides' Association, Chelsea Benevolent Society, Australian Red Cross Society and the Victorian Baby Health Centres Association. A swimming teacher, she was awarded the recognition badge of the Royal Life Saving Society in 1963 and the community services award of the Rotary Club of Aspendale in 1977. Appointed Officer of the Order of the British Empire in 1970, she was included on the Victorian Honour Roll of Women in 2001 and has a kindergarten in Aspendale named after her.

Barber co-founded the Australian Local Government Women's Association in 1951 and joined the Australian Labor Party in 1955, visiting China and Japan as a delegate in 1958. She ran unsuccessfully as a Labor candidate for the federal seat of Flinders in 1958 and 1963 and the state seat of Mentone in 1961 and 1967. She served on the 1959 peace congress committee in Melbourne and was a member of the Australian and New Zealand Congress for International Co-operation and Disarmament, the United Nations Association of Australia (Victoria), the Union of Australian Women and the Aborigines Advancement League (Victoria). Founding president of the Save Our Sons organisation, an anti-conscriptionist movement, in 1965, Barber was also a trained violinist. She died at Colac in 1985 and was cremated.
