= Union of Australian Women =

Australian women's organization

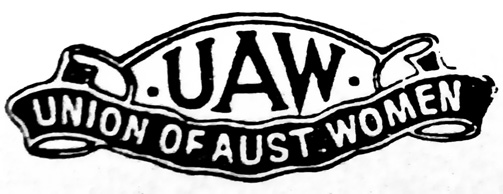
- Abbreviation: UAW
- Predecessor: New Housewives' Association
- Formation: 31 July 1950; 76 years ago
- Dissolved: 1995; 31 years ago (national), 1999; 27 years ago (Queensland branch)
- Type: Social action organisation
- Headquarters: Sydney (1950–1996), Melbourne (1996–)
- Members: approx. 200 (1995, Victoria)
- Key people: Freda Brown, Dorothy Hewett, Audrey McDonald, Anne Sgro, Eva Bacon, Cath Morrison
- Affiliations: UNIFEM, WEL, Women's International Democratic Federation, WILPF
- Website: uaw.org.au

The Union of Australian Women (UAW) is a left-wing women's organisation concerned with local and international issues regarding women's rights, international peace and equality.

The UAW was established in Sydney on 31 July 1950 in New South Wales. Branches in Victoria, Queensland, South Australia, Western Australia and Tasmania soon followed. In 1956 a national UAW was set up, with an executive committee based in Sydney and representatives from each state organisation.

The UAW's self-published magazine, Our Women, mixed mainstream content such as recipes with news from the trade union movement, tracts on women's equality and articles on Aboriginal rights. Although the UAW was never officially affiliated with any political party many of its founding members were in close contact with Communist Party of Australia. The Australian Security Intelligence Organisation (ASIO) kept the organisation under surveillance during the 1950s and '60s.

The UAW campaigned for women's rights to work, with equal pay and conditions, affordable childcare, Indigenous rights and the environment, and strongly protested against Australia's involvement in the Vietnam War. The UAW vigorously protested against the South African apartheid movement.

International Women's Day was almost solely organised by the UAW in the early years after World War II and the UAW organised the first United Nations-sponsored international conferences for women in 1975, International Women's Year.

The UAW enjoyed success in the 1950s and 1960s with their combination of the conventional and subversive, being a "product of both mainstream and left culture" but were considered conservative by the post-Vietnam Women's liberation movement.

By the late 1980s and 1990s, the UAW began winding down. Currently the Victorian UAW continues. The UAW (Vic) is currently the National body as well as the Victorian body.

== History ==
The UAW was established in Sydney on 31 July 1950 as the successor to the New Housewives' Association (NHA), with the first branch formed in New South Wales, soon followed by Victoria, Queensland, South Australia, Western Australia and Tasmania. The Northern Territory had a branch revived from the defunct Darwin Housewives' Association, but purportedly attracted few members due to concerns of Communist affiliation.

In 1956, the national UAW organisation was formed, comprising an executive committee based in Sydney and representatives from each state organisation. While executive decisions on national/international issues and state issues were planned at the national and state levels respectively, the bulk of activities were carried out by suburban (and regional) sub-groups in each state (e.g. Sunshine and Mildura respectively in Victoria). Through this grassroots approach, the UAW was on one hand able to connect housewives and mothers in local communities to national or international issues beyond the home, and on the other, provide the organisational backing to campaign for improvements in their members' immediate surroundings—such as child-minding centres in Rockhampton.

=== Maternalism ===
The UAW's name, as opposed to the NHA's, reflected their aim to attract "all women", recognising that those who stayed in the post-war workforce were no longer necessarily housewives and would want to identify otherwise.

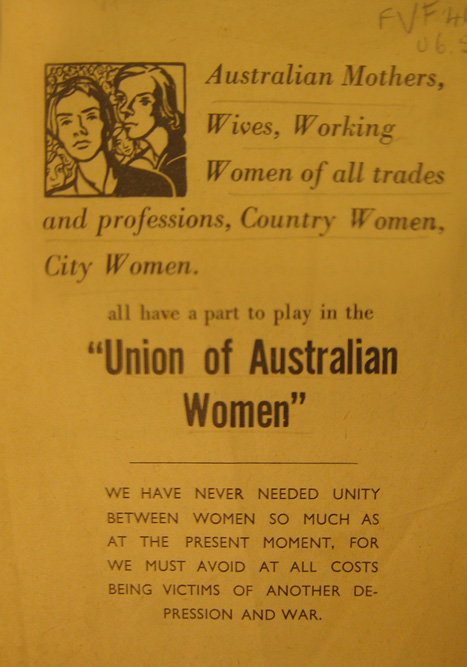
Undated UAW flyer inviting women from various backgrounds to join

Nevertheless, the domestic focus persevered, especially through the 1950s, shaping what has come to be called UAW's "maternalist" approach. The working-class mothers and housewives who comprised the bulk of earlier UAW membership did challenge traditional maternalism by recognising the necessity for women to work, and in Victoria overcame traditional maternalist policies by advocating local and subsidised childcare for all working women. Nevertheless, they subscribed to the underlying notion that children were a woman's responsibility, which informed their stance on issues from living costs to environmental damage, and especially war. The UAW's significant peace activism stemmed from the perceived universal concern of mothers over the mental and physical well-being of children.

Women protesting with UAW banner and apron during Aldermaston peace march in Brisbane, 1964

Maternalism provided the ideological backdrop for domestic activities, such as apron-making and millinery demonstrations, to comfortably coexist alongside equally important discussions on serious political issues in local group meetings. Similarly, the UAW's self-published magazine, Our Women, juxtaposed mainstream content such as recipes, light-hearted chat and fashion tips against the latest workers' union news, tracts on women's equality and articles on Aboriginal rights.

The UAW's discourse on the universality of motherhood followed a long tradition of uniting women across race, class, and even national divisions, providing an impetus for local women to agitate for change "from within, rather than from the fringes of, mainstream society".

=== Political affiliation ===
Although the UAW was never officially affiliated with any political party, it was associated with the Communist movement from its inception. Many of its founding members were Communist women who kept in close contact with Communist Party of Australia, which, along with the NHA and other UAW-affiliated organisations, narrowly avoided dissolution by the defeated Communist Party Dissolution Act 1950 (Cth).

The magazine Our Women was established and first edited and published in 1952 by Dorothy Hewett, a foundation member of the UWA, a journalist and a member of the Communist Party. She had the idea while travelling to Vienna as a UWA delegate after seeing similar initiatives abroad. Hewett and others supported a then "radical agenda" that included peace, disarmament, gender equality and Indigenous rights.

When, in 1954, the UAW collected individual signatures supporting a ban on hydrogen and atomic bombs and sent them to then-Federal Minister for Labour and National Service Harold Holt, Holt sent back each slip to its signatory, denouncing the UAW as "completely under the control of the Communist Party of Australia", characterising their methods as "insidious" and "deceptive".

Former CPA members later claimed the CPA had little direct involvement in the UAW's actions and that the UAW was "not a danger to the status quo". However, the circumstances surrounding the UAW's formation and individual members' actions in the politically hostile Cold War environment earned it the continued scrutiny of the Australian Security Intelligence Organisation through the 1950s and 1960s. Member Barbara Curthoys claimed that every state branch had "at least one ASIO agent" in a book launch of the UAW's official history. Accordingly, the UAW did not keep a full record of members during that period.

Despite initial condemnation by the New South Wales Australian Labor Party, the UAW also attracted ALP members such as Nola Barber after the party split in 1955 and relaxed its ban on members from joining Communist-linked organisations.

At the local level, the UAW focused on the everyday lives of its members and sought to relate them to broader political issues, rather than dictate party policy.

== Women's issues ==
One of the UAW's key concerns was the well-being of women across the world. While the UAW located women within its broader campaigns (see sections below), it also focused on women's issues pertinent to its largely working-class membership of housewives and young mothers in the relatively anti-feminist early Cold War era. They campaigned for women's rights to work and receive equal treatment, hand-in-hand with affordable and universal childcare. With the rise of the Women's Liberation movement in the 1970s, reproductive rights and contraception became an additional focus, although the UAW's persistent maternalist and domestic approach struggled to keep up with the eventual trajectory of feminism.

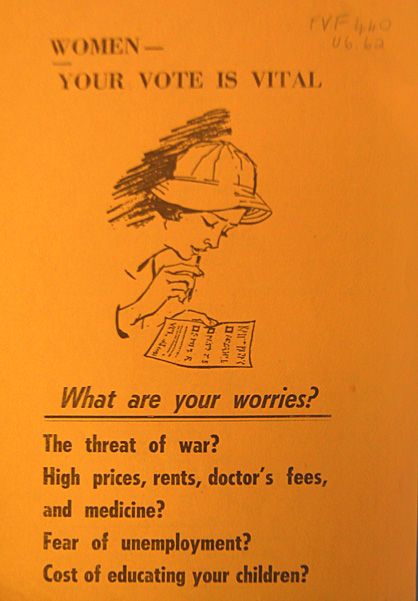
1963 flyer from Sydney, urging women to vote

=== Women in the workplace ===
The UAW started off in an environment hostile to the notion of women joining the workforce, despite the availability of work, availability of time afforded by advances in domestic technology, and the necessity for working-class households to meet rising costs of living (another target of the UAW's efforts; see below). Initial protests and letter-writing campaigns for equal pay therefore received little support from the public and even from worker's unions, whose ideas of equal family wages rested mostly on men earning the bulk of income. Nevertheless, the UAW realised working with unions would be the most effective, petitioning and vocally advocating for the issue without letting it be ignored, even as many UAW members did not personally insist on being independent earners.

By the late 1960s, the tide was inevitably turning as women continued to take up work; most UAW members were now employed, although regular participants necessarily accorded their own jobs a secondary role in order to participate in UAW activities. At this point the UAW voluntarily cooperated with the nascent Women's Liberation Movement organisation in Australia, actively distributing leaflets at rallies. The UAW's most noted contributions were submissions to the National Wage Cases: firstly in 1969, where 6-year UAW member and future Parliament member Joan Child acted as spokesman for the ACTU's test case; then in 1972 alongside the Women's Electoral Lobby with partial success, followed by 1974 and 1983.

As the UAW saw their efforts come to fruition with the introduction of progressive legislation and encouraging results in the workforce, they remained persistent in supporting equal treatment at the workplace. In 1981, for example, NSW state secretary Lee Gorman pledged the UAW's support in pursuing the case of four women appealing to the Anti-Discrimination Board for being stood down by the Urban Transit Authority for being pregnant.

=== Childcare ===
Childcare was one of the UAW's earliest and most significant concerns. Their advocacy for working women was inextricably linked to their push for government-supported childcare accessible by all women. This was consistent with their position that mothers, not both parents, were responsible for children's welfare, and thus childcare was purely a women's issue. While this position fell out of favour with the feminism of women's groups from the 1970s onwards, it was once ahead of its time, challenging the traditional maternalist thinking dominant in the 1950s and 1960s, which dictated that women had to look after their children at home.

The UAW's efforts were particularly vigorous in Victoria, where childcare (commonly referred to as child-minding) through the 1950s and 1960s was considered a last resort—a recourse only for single mothers, the destitute and otherwise "unfortunate". Married women who required childcare to work were urged to put their family first instead. Local authorities were slow in regulating the mushrooming private childcare institutions, and insistent that childcare/pre-school services not enable mothers to "park children". In response, the UAW, despite their relatively limited political influence, worked at local levels by making mothers aware of existing efforts, and collecting data to present to local authorities as evidence establishing the pressing need for quality, accessible childcare and preschool services. Crucially, this involved lobbying for local government funding as well as higher child endowments.

Although the UAW met with limited success in the 1950s and early 1960s, it was ironically near the end of the 1960s, when they started losing members to the Women's Liberation movement, that their efforts to lay the necessary groundwork paid off. Childcare became a mainstream concern, and prominent UAW members such as Alma Morton built on their experience to become leaders in the successful Victorian community childcare movement. Anne Sgro was active in her local area in establishing an early childcare centre.

=== Women's health and reproductive rights ===
The UAW initially took a broad approach towards women's health, organising public meetings and letter-writing campaigns on topics from cervical cancer to childbirth. On the issue of contraception and reproductive rights, members in the 1950s and 1960s generally tended to be ambivalent, particularly over the issue of abortion, with many preferring to place their faith in the medical profession for making individual decisions. Although the UAW was more assertive than the public on women's health, they were less progressive than most women's groups in the 1960s.

By the 1970s, however, this hesitant position was untenable as birth control became a central topic of mainstream public discussion. The UAW's conservative approach quickly became more supportive, with members successfully lobbying with the Women's Liberation movement for the removal of tax on contraceptives in 1973. Victorian members worked against anti-abortionists taking over the directory boards of the Royal Women's and Queen Victoria hospitals between 1970 and 1975, and publicly countered their attempts to exclude abortion from the Medicare rebate scheme. 1973 also saw the UAW officially incorporate a pro-choice policy.

== National Issues ==
The UAW was also concerned with broader national issues that manifested in national, state, and local-level action. Chief among these issues were living standards, Indigenous rights and the environment.

=== Living Standards campaigns ===
Purchasing power was a matter of great concern to the UAW's mostly working-class membership, who used the opportunity in the UAW to protest against price increases in the face of static wages. One of their first actions was a city rally, organised in 1950 in conjunction with the Trades Union Defence Committee. The Korean War saw the price of living in Australia rise by 21% in 1951, which spurred the UAW to heat up their campaign for an affordable decent standard of living. They would conduct surveys and draw up petitions on the cost of living, which would then be passed on to unions as evidence in wage cases. The UAW argued their own cases as well—for example, in a 1953 inquiry on milk prices in Sydney, where the UAW president spoke from the viewpoint of a mother responsible for her children's nutrition.

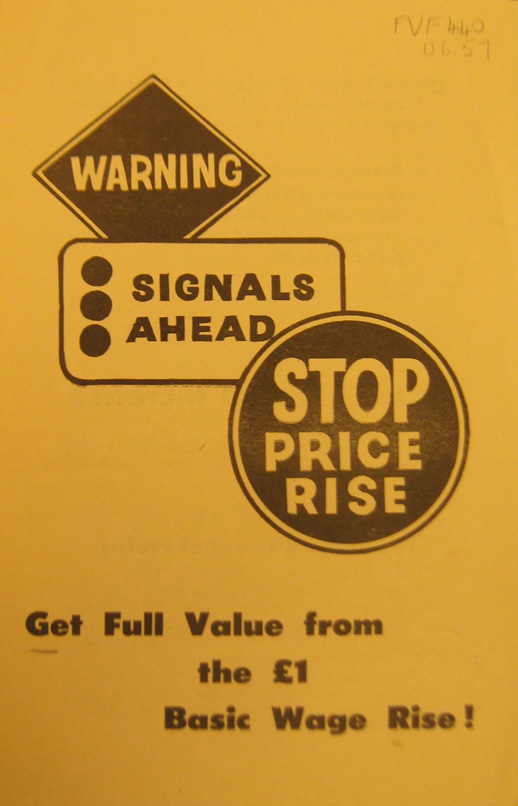
UAW flyer on price rises, 1964

In 1964, the UAW had a successful submission to the Milk Board on behalf of pensioners. This would be one of their limited victories in the area of campaigning for affordability.

Despite these efforts, in 1970 The Herald reported that the "price of living had increased faster than the minimum wage". In response, the UAW joined about a dozen militant groups in a discussion of the cost of living and price control.

As the women of the union aged, they continued to monitor and comment on wages and living costs, but their focus shifted to the needs and living standards of senior citizens and pensioners, whose static pensions were particularly affected by inflation.

=== Indigenous rights activism ===
The UAW was an early, ardent and constant supporter of Indigenous rights, striving to promote racial equality consistent with their left-wing opposition to oppression. They were affiliated with Aboriginal groups such as the Aborigines Advancement League (AAL) and the Council for Aboriginal Rights (CAR) with some members serving on their committees. UAW member Shirley Andrews was the first secretary for the CAR in Victoria in 1952, and prominent Aboriginal activist Pearl Gibbs served on the management committee of the UAW's NSW branch, acting as an important link between the Aboriginal and women's movements.

As well as sending representatives to attend AAL and CAR meetings, the UAW encouraged Aboriginal members to join, such as Melva Walsh, who was the vice-president of the Moe, Victoria UAW group in the 1960s and led an eventually successful campaign on land rights for Indigenous people forced off the Lake Tyers reserve in the 1960s. The UAW also invited Kath Walker/Oodgeroo Noonuccal and Gladys O'Shane (mother of Pat O'Shane) to speak regularly at meetings, where they were widely welcomed. Notably, the UAW also strived to depict Indigenous people in a positive light in their magazine Our Women, in stark contrast to mainstream media at the time.

The UAW's constant lobbying against racist laws in the 1950s and 1960s were finally vindicated by the 1967 Australian referendum, where over 90% of Australians voted to give Australian Aborigines citizenship as well as equal rights under federal jurisdiction.

From this point, Indigenous organisations began to gain greater agency and were able to rely on their own voice. Nevertheless, the UAW continued to aid and support Indigenous people where possible. In 1970, the UAW were active in aiding the Roper River People's land rights claim and then in September 1971 they similarly aided the Gurindji people. Between 1971 and 1974, the UAW held fourteen meetings focusing on Indigenous issues and racism, as well as inviting Aboriginal women to speak at the 1972 and 1974 International Women's Day celebrations, and having members who shared their experience in northern and inland Australian Indigenous communities.

Over the late 1970s and early 1980s, the Indigenous rights movement had come into its own, and eventually drifted away from the UAW. While the organisational relationships faded, the UAW nevertheless remained fully supportive of Indigenous causes and continued to contribute when possible, such as donating a third of a received bequest to the Oenpelli Community School.

=== Environmental lobbying ===
The UAW was one of the first urban women's groups to act on environmental issues, starting in the 1960s after being inspired by ideas brought from America in books such as Silent Spring, and the controversy over Agent Orange. The establishment of the Australian Conservation Foundation in 1966 consolidated national interest in environmental concerns; however, the UAW did not officially affiliate with the ACF until 1976.

The UAW's interest in the environment was most consistently maintained by country members; it was "ad hoc", shifting from topic to topic as suited the more influential members. Their focus in the 1960s was to petition local and state governments against the use of harmful pesticides such as dieldrin, which then shifted to the protection of bushland and promotion of recycling. Bringing it back to a domestic angle, the UAW placed particular emphasis on personal responsibility to reduce waste in the household.

The UAW also maintained a constant anti-nuclear stance that was mostly focused on the destructive potential of nuclear weapons, but also stemmed from their maternal concern over the long-term environmental consequences future generations would have to bear. They stood alongside environmental groups in firmly opposing uranium mining in Australia, particularly the Australian government's controversial decision to invest in uranium mining in 1977.

One of the UAW's last major environmental acts was to petition the government to seek a heritage listing for Kakadu National Park in 1989, in consideration of its significance to the Aboriginal traditional owners, and the environmental threat posed by the nearby Ranger Uranium Mine.

== International issues ==
In addition to supporting local causes, the UAW was also vocal on international causes, particularly peace. Through personal correspondence and grassroots campaigns, they addressed conflicts related to issues of equality and freedom, and strongly protested against Australia's involvement in the Vietnam War.

While the UAW likely had minimal impact on foreign affairs, organisation leaders were motivated by an "ideological commitment" and members gained the satisfaction of being part of an international movement. Decisions made at the executive level were often informed by their links to other Communist-related organisations, such as the Women's International Democratic Federation (WIDF). As such, the shift of power during the Cold War had a noticeable influence on the UAW's international outlook.

=== Vietnam War ===
The UAW was fundamentally committed to peace, both from a general anti-violence perspective and a feminist/maternal one, which championed the nurturing, peaceful qualities of mothers. This rhetoric created an obligation to protest, by specifically highlighting the damage war had on children.

Consequently, the UAW staunchly opposed the most problematic war during their peak period of activity—the Vietnam War. UAW members participated in moratoriums and launched letter-writing campaigns that encouraged disarmament while objecting to conscription and the imprisonment of draft resisters. Some members, notably Nola Barber, banded with women from other organisations to form the successful Save Our Sons organisation in 1965. When five Save Our Sons members, later dubbed the Fairlea Five, were jailed in Fairlea for distributing anti-war pamphlets, the UAW publicly supported their release.

Badge presumably from QLD branch of UAW, date unknown

Unfortunately, as the peace movement was inherently linked to Communism for much of the 1950s and 1960s, the UAW started out with little support. However, by the end of the 1960s, anti-Vietnam sentiment began mirroring the highly publicised American popular opinion, and the UAW went from being relatively radical to conservative.

The UAW also kept close correspondence with the Vietnamese Women's Union, visiting North Vietnam as their guests even as Australia was still at war with the country.

After the war's conclusion, the UAW sent support for the improvement of conditions in Hanoi.

=== Nuclear testing ===
Central to the peace movement was a strong objection to the use of nuclear weapons. The UAW took a particularly maternalist interpretation of this, focusing on the universal plight of children during war, and particularly nuclear warfare, which could leave a mark for decades on children's lives. From the 1960s through to the 1980s, the UAW opposed French and Chinese atmospheric nuclear testing, stood alongside environmental groups in opposing uranium mining, spread petitions during the 1980s nuclear arms race, and were committed to supporting the 1983 Royal Commission into the United Kingdom's atomic testing on Australian sites.

UAW members protesting nuclear energy with banner and aprons, Brisbane, 1964

However, while peace united many members earlier in the organisation's lifetime, it also proved to be a divisive sticking point later on. The UAW's executive committee was affected by a "pro-Soviet bias", choosing not to take specific action against the Soviet Union in the aftermath of the Chernobyl disaster. Opinions over the Partial Test Ban Treaty also caused a split along ideological lines, eventually contributing to the UAW's gradual decline.

=== Anti-Apartheid ===
The UAW protested the South African apartheid movement since the 1950s, maintaining support for various anti-apartheid citizens and figures, including Elizabeth Mafekeng and Helen Joseph. In addition, they boycotted multiple avenues of African trade due to their stance on apartheid. Their long-standing support of the African National Congress was finally acknowledged by Nelson Mandela when he visited Sydney in 1990.

=== International Women's Day/Year ===
After the war, International Women's Day was almost solely organised by the UAW for a few years, as many other organisations feared the communist associations of the event. For the UAW, it was a rare opportunity to interact with international guests and migrants, connecting local women with international movements.

As the UAW continued supporting it, public attitudes turned from hostility and disapproval to indifference in the 1960s, and then finally to far greater support in the 1970s with the rise of Women's Liberation. In 1972, the UAW collaborated with other organisations to conduct a highly successful rally of 2–3000 people in Melbourne.

The UAW's efforts culminated in their role in organising the first United Nations-sponsored international conferences for women in 1975, which the United Nations declared International Women's Year. Prominent attendees included Elizabeth Anne Reid and Margaret Whitlam, as well as Joan Child who was now able to assist as a Member of Federal Parliament. In addition to appropriating and implementing the proposals established at these initial conferences, they continued to participate in several of the UN's "International Decade for Women" conferences worldwide.

=== International guests and exchanges ===
The UAW's founding undercurrent of coupling Soviet-influenced internationalism with the "common female experience" promoted regular interaction with individuals and organisations from multiple countries, often women's unions that shared similar goals and philosophies. Among these, the most prominent and long-standing affiliation was with the Women's International Democratic Federation (WIDF), of which UAW national president Freda Brown went on to serve as president from 1975 to 1989. Traditional women's organisations shied away from associating with in the 1950s due to the WIDF's Communist reputation., but the UAW proudly and frequently featured WIDF-produced content in their magazine Our Women, offering suburban housewives a connection to socialist women's movements across the world.

Over the years, the UAW formally received foreign nationals from various countries. The UAW's tendency to invite women from socialist and communist countries would sometimes result in minor controversies during the Cold War. One example was when the UAW invited visitors from the People's Republic of China in 1962, when the Australian government did not officially recognise their citizens, causing an unnamed large firm to pull out of an exhibition they were to co-sponsor with the UAW. Even in 1980, one of the UAW's Russian guests attracted media attention for being completely unaware of the federal ban on Russian entry.

Through international contacts, the UAW also concerned itself with individual plights of socio-political importance, such as the imprisonment of prominent civil rights activist Angela Davis.

== Legacy ==
The UAW enjoyed success in the 1950s and 1960s with their combination of the conventional and subversive, being a "product of both mainstream and left culture". However, this also proved to be their weak point, as the UAW's continued focus on peaceful motherhood started to seem outmoded and ineffective to a new generation of activists and campaigners in the vigorous post-Vietnam Women's Liberation movement. The Sydney branch in particular experienced several clashes with the Women's Liberation groups, and were accused of being "conservative" and "ladylike". While the UAW did attempt to keep up, reflected by the increasing seriousness of content in Our Women and records of continuous efforts through the 1970s, they struggled to identify with the concepts and approaches of this new wave of feminism, not only failing to attract many new members but losing others to more radical feminist groups. Furthermore, the mothers and housewives that comprised most of their membership began dedicating more time to work and less time to the UAW. Membership steadily declined; in Victoria, the UAW went from an estimated 5–600 members in the 1950s to 400 in 1960, 300 in 1964 and around 200 by the end of the 1970s, at which they stayed throughout the 1980s and 1990s. The small Western Australian and Tasmanian branches disbanded around this time as well.

Another cause of the organisation's decline was the Sino-Soviet split that affected the CPA, resulting in the formation of the pro-Soviet Socialist Party of Australia (SPA). By then, the UAW had only a loose association with the CPA, but conflicts nevertheless arose between the CPA-aligned Victorian branch and the SPA-aligned New South Wales and national executive committees, especially over the Partial Nuclear Test Ban Treaty of 1963. Given that the UAW's local operations aimed to politicise the everyday and not necessarily along party lines, some members left in disappointment over the extent to which the Sino-Soviet split spilled over into the UAW; others left after questioning the executive-level support of controversial policies in Communist countries.

Although by 1991, the CPA's closure had no effect on the UAW and the UAW's support for paternity leave in 1989 represents an interesting update of their maternalist foundation, they never quite recovered from the decrease in membership and effectiveness caused by the compromised leadership and ideological divides of the 1970s and 1980s.

By the late 1980s and 1990s, the organisation had shrunk considerably, with the gradual dissolution and amalgamation of local groups and the streamlining of the national committee in 1993. Political and organisational disagreements led to a lapse in relations with the WIDF in the 1980s, culminating in the end of a long-held affiliation in 1996. As their members entered old age, some passing away, the UAW itself eventually began winding down, and the national organisation closed in 1995. The NSW branch followed suit in 1996, the Queensland branch in 1999.

Currently, only the Victorian UAW survives, headed by Anne Sgro. It remains active (2019), with a recorded statement from 2011 strongly denouncing the bombing of Afghanistan and the Australian government's treatment of asylum seekers, particularly in the Tampa affair.

== Affiliations ==
The UAW has, throughout its history, campaigned alongside other organisations across various fields. They often worked in conjunction with unions and women's groups to send out stronger messages and bring about social change. The joint intervention in the 1983 National Wage Case with the Women's Electoral Lobby and National Council of Women of Australia was an example.

Some notable organisations the UAW stated affiliation with include:

- Australian People for Health, Education and Development Abroad (APHEDA)
- UNIFEM
- UNICEF
- Waterside Workers' Federation and Seamen's Union of Australia Women's Committees
- Women's Electoral Lobby (WEL)
- Women's International Democratic Federation (WIDF)
- Women's International League for Peace and Freedom (WILPF)

== Selected publications ==
The UAW released a range of periodic publications during the height of their activity, the most representative being mixed-content magazine, Our Women, which ceased publication in 1971 owing to the changed circumstances of the UAW. They also released official histories of the national (More Than a Hat and Glove Brigade) and Queensland (Daring to Take a Stand) branches near their closures. A comprehensive history of the Victorian branch (Left-Wing Ladies) was published in 2000 by non-members Suzanne Fabian and Morag Loh. Publication information was compiled from indexes on the Australian Women's Register and Trove.

=== Books ===
- Union of Australian Women (1980), For the rights of women: three decades of struggle, 1950–1980 : 30th anniversary, Sydney: Union of Australian Women, ISBN 978-0-9598730-9-2
- Curthoys, B. (Barbara); McDonald, Audrey; Union of Australian Women (1996), More than a hat and glove brigade : the story of the Union of Australian Women, Sydney: Bookpress, ISBN 978-0-949861-16-0
- Andrews, Iris; Union of Australian Women. Newcastle Branch (1997), A history of the Newcastle/Central Coast branch of the Union of Australian women, Newcastle, NSW: The Branch
- Knopman, Debbie; Union of Australian Women. New South Wales Branch (1995), History of Union of Australian Women, Eastern Suburbs Branch, Sydney: Union of Australian Women, NSW Branch, ISBN 978-0-949861-15-3
- Young, Pam (1998), Daring to take a stand : the story of the Union of Australian Women in Queensland, Wavell Heights, Qld.: Pam Young, ISBN 978-0-949861-17-7
- Miller, Beryl (2005), Marsden, Susan (ed.), Years of struggle : reminiscences of the Union of Australian Women in South Australia, 1950–2005, Adelaide: Union of Australian Women, SA, ISBN 978-0-646-45605-8
- Gilchrist, Roma Catherine (1990), Union of Australian Women : a history of the WA Branch, Perth: L.J. Fleay

=== Newsletters ===
- Union of Australian Women (1953–1971), Our women : national magazine of the Union of Australian Women, Sydney: Union of Australian Women
- Union of Australian Women, New South Wales Branch (1967–1996), "U.A.W. news sheet : Union of Australian Women, N.S.W. news sheet", News Sheet, ISSN 0314-0571
- Union of Australian Women, Victorian Section (1964–2020), Newsletter, The Section
- Union of Australian Women, Queensland Branch (1954–1999), UAW News, Brisbane
- Union of Australian Women, Western Australian Branch (1966–1973), U.A.W. newsletter

=== Records ===
Some of the UAW's correspondence, flyers, records and other papers have been archived at the following libraries:

- Union of Australian Women National Committee (1950–1995), Records, Australian National University Library
- Union of Australian Women New South Wales Branch (1950–1991), Records, Australian National University Library
- Union of Australian Women Victorian Branch, Records of the Union of Australian Women (1950 onwards), Victoria University St Albans campus library
- Union of Australian Women Queensland Branch (1950–1998), Records, The University of Queensland Fryer Library
- Union of Australian Women South Australian Branch (1950–2005), Records of the Union of Australian Women, South Australian Branch 1950–2005, State Library of South Australia, Mortlock Library of South Australiana
- Union of Australian Women Western Australian Branch (1950–1973), Records, State Library of Western Australia

== Notable members ==
- Freda Brown, national secretary, then national president 1967–1975
- Audrey McDonald, National Secretary 1967–1969, 1972–1993
- Flo Cluff, vice-president of NSW branch in the 1950s
- Alison Dickie, founding member, peace activist, vice-president and president 1950s
- Lee Rhiannon, secretary of NSW branch 1980–1983
- Pearl Gibbs, NSW branch management committee
- Nola Barber
- Eva Bacon
- Oodgeroo Noonuccal
- Henrietta Greville
- Lily D'Ambrosio
- Mary Lester, WA Branch Secretary
- Molly Thorp, WA Branch Treasurer
- Joan Curlewis, Victoria Branch, former president and National Committee member
