= Mount Alexander College =

Public school in Melbourne, Australia

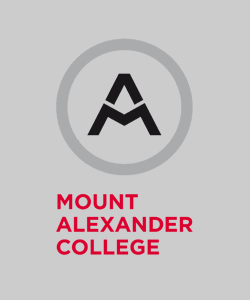
- Pictured in 2008, as Debney Park Secondary College

Location
- 78 Wellington St; Flemington, Melbourne, Victoria; Australia
- 37°46′56″S 144°55′58″E

Information
- Type: Public secondary college, coeducational
- Motto: Empowering students
- Established: 1858; 168 years ago
- Principal: Dani Angelico
- Years offered: 7–12
- Enrolment: 800
- Campus: Suburban
- Colours: Red, white and gray
- Website: mountalexandercollege.vic.edu.au

Mount Alexander College, formerly known as Debney Park Secondary College, is a public high school located on Mount Alexander Road, Flemington, a suburb of Melbourne in Victoria, Australia.

== History ==
In 1858, Flemington National School was established. The school building was colloquially referred to as the 'iron pot' for its distinct iron structure. On 31 March 1885 the school was closed due to increased competition from newer neighbouring schools in Ascot Vale and Kensington. The school was reopened later the same year to relieve overcrowding at Kensington State School. The upgrading and rebuilding of Flemington State School No. 250, saw the school reopened as Flemington School of Domestic Arts, which catered exclusively for girls in Forms 1–3 (Years 7–9). A navy tunic, white blouse, hat and gloves became the school's uniform.

Due to the changing needs of the local community, the Department of Education decided in the early 1970s that the school should become coeducational. Debney Park High School was formed and boys were introduced into Form 1 in 1973. The last all-girls class was Form 5 in 1976. In 1996 the older sections of the school were demolished and replaced by the buildings that occupy the site today. To provide much-needed recreational space for its increasing enrolment, the Department of Education purchased a site adjacent to the school from the Uniting Church in 1999.

At the end of 2011, the school was renamed Mount Alexander College.

=== School Names ===
Years	Name
1858–1862	Flemington National School
1873–1923	Flemington S.S. No. 250
1925–1931	Flemington School of Domestic Arts
1931–1966	Flemington Girls’ School
1966–1972	Flemington Girls’ High School
1973–1983	Debney Park High School
1983–2011	Debney Park Secondary College
2011–present	Mount Alexander College
