= John Hans Stroh =

Australian health advocate, businessman and researcher

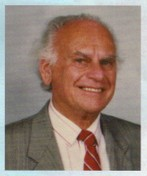
- John Hans Stroh in 1990
- Born: 15 May 1916; Vienna, Austria-Hungary
- Died: 17 September 1996 (aged 80); Melbourne, Australia

John Hans Stroh (15 May 1916 – 17 September 1996) was an Australian health advocate, businessman and researcher. He had a varied career that ranged from fighter aircraft fatigue testing at the Commonwealth Aircraft Corporation (CAC), and scientific research at the CSIRO, to running a swimming pool business and a fish canning business. Stroh also had an innovative approach to health, which manifested itself in the formation of a health training organisation (ACNEM).

== Early years ==
Originally Hans Stroh, he was born and educated in Vienna, Austria. Stroh arrived in Melbourne, Australia in January 1939 as a sponsored refugee, having left Vienna with one of his brothers, George Stroh just prior to the outbreak of the Second World War.

Some of his relatives also landed in Australia including, in the 1950s, his cousin John Blatt who was a theoretical physicist that worked in the University of Sydney and then the University of NSW.

== Name change ==
Soon after arriving in Australia, on 27 January 1939, he changed his name to John Hans Straw. Then, on 25 September 1953, he changed it to John Hans Stroh, partly due to the encouragement of his new wife, Ann Roberts. They were married on 28 September 1953.

== Life in Australia ==
Stroh commenced work as an automobile mechanic in Melbourne soon after he arrived in 1939, having trained as a mechanic at the Lancia factory in Vienna. After having worked for the CAC and the CSIRO, he decided to start his own business importing and exporting steel with his brother Oscar Stroh in New York, USA. He called the company, Straw Brothers (Exports) Pty Ltd.

From there, he started a swimming pool construction business (Aqua Pools Pty Ltd) in the early 1960s. This company was responsible for the construction of many of the first in-ground concrete swimming pools in Australia, including pools at large hotels such as the Parkroyal in Royal Parade Parkville, and the Palm Lake Motel in Queens Road.

In the late 1960s, he sold the swimming pool business and embarked upon another venture (Victorian Canning Company Pty Ltd), whose business was canning fish. He built a factory in Arthur Street Fairfield, canning scallops and tuna initially, and eventually specialising in canning abalone. He earned the name "Mr Abalone" because he was the first person in Australia to actually create a market overseas for Australian abalone. This market still exists today. Stroh was an expert in liaising with both the abalone divers who supplied the company and the Asian and Californian markets that required this product.

The supply chain he created enabled him to sell off most of the canning business by the mid-1970s and purchase a large sheep station, called Tallering Station, near Mullewa, Western Australia. He sold the business to the US company Beatrice Foods, which was then one of the largest corporations in the US.

In the late 1970s, he then ventured into the financial markets, concentrating on financial consulting to merchant banks. About this time he also became interested in holistic medicine, particularly concerning the use of nutrition and vitamins to fight disease. During this time he also acted as a consultant to the Australian Wheat Board, where he helped to organise the first Australian wheat exports to India.

== Nutritional medicine ==
Prompted by his interest in holistic medicine, in 1979 Stroh founded the Orthomolecular Medical Association of Australia (OMAA) with Dr. Ian Brighthope, Dr. Robert Allen, Dr.Iggy Soosay, Dr John Piesse and Mr Hainsworth Cock. At that time the term "orthomolecular medicine" was almost unknown in Australia, having been coined by Nobel Laureate Linus Pauling to describe the treatment of disease through optimal nutrition. For the next seventeen years, Stroh pursued his commitment to these ideas as the Honorary Secretary of this organization.

In 1982, the OMAA was renamed the Australian College of Nutritional Medicine which became The Australasian College of Nutritiona and Environmental Medicine(ACNEM).

== Funeral ==
Stroh's funeral was held at the Beaumaris Yacht Club shortly after his death. Many important Melburnians attended including Frank Crean, Treasurer and Deputy Prime Minister to Gough Whitlam's cabinet in the early 1970s. He and Stroh had a friendship that dated back to his import/export business in the 1960s. Other mentionable people that attended the funeral included Dr Ian Brighthope, Mr Hainsworth Cock and Michelle Doherty.
